= Zwycięzców Street =

Street in Warsaw, Poland

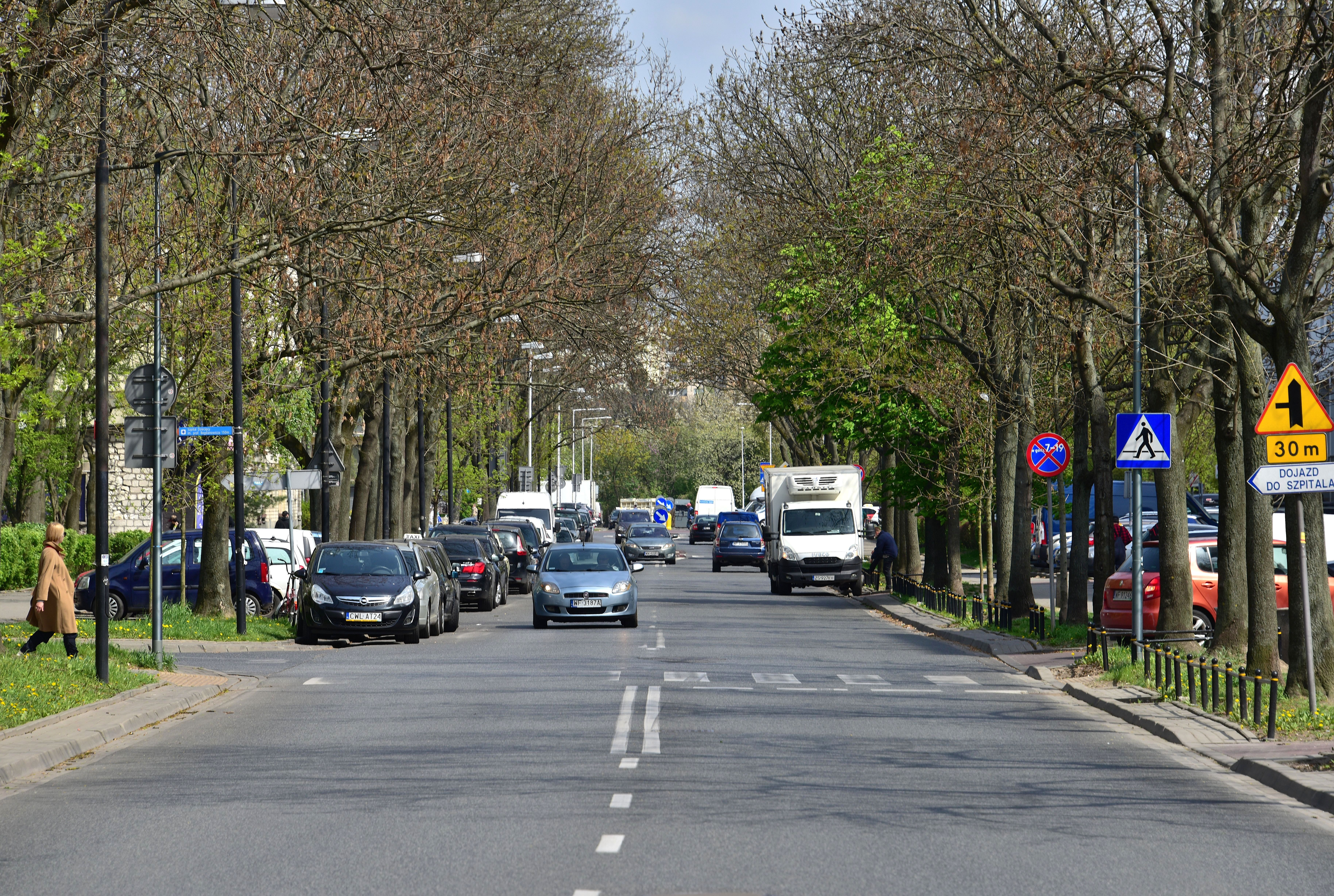
- Zwycięzców Street at Niekłańska Street, view eastward
- Former name: August III Street
- Part of: Saska Kępa
- Length: 1.3 km (0.81 mi)
- Location: Warsaw, Poland
- Coordinates: 52°13′55.9″N 21°3′34.1″E
- From: Wał Miedzeszyński Street
- Major junctions: Kryniczna Street/Katowicka Street (175 m); Zakopiańska Street (270 m); Poselska Street (285 m); Francuska Street, Alliance Square (380 m); Wandy Street/Aldony Street (475 m); Jan Styka Street (555 m); Alfred Nobel Street (642 m); Saska Street (740 m); Niekłańska Street (850 m); Międzynarodowa Street (1,150 m)
- To: Exhibition Canal (1,275 m)

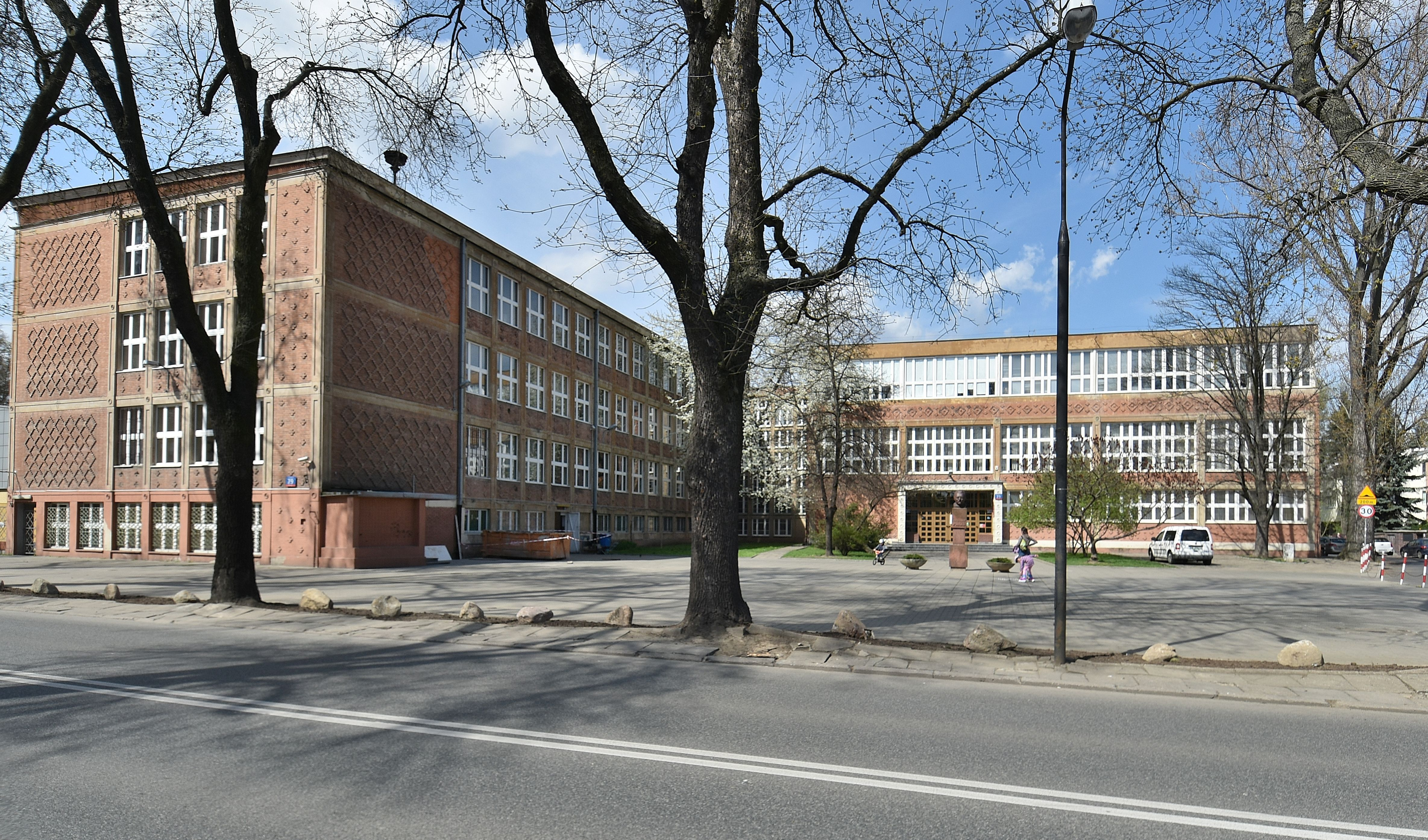
Building of School Complex No. 77, including Bolesław Prus High School (7/9 Zwycięzców Street)

Zwycięzców Street is a street in the Saska Kępa neighborhood of the Praga-Południe district in Warsaw, Poland. It begins at Wał Miedzeszyński Street and ends at the Exhibition Canal.

The street's name, meaning "Victors Street", refers to the World War I era and Poland's independence struggles, similar to other Saska Kępa streets like parallel Obrońców Street (Defenders Street) and Walecznych Street (Valiant Street). The area features mainly residential buildings, service points, diplomatic missions, and schools.

== Route and traffic ==
Zwycięzców Street starts at Wał Miedzeszyński Street and ends near Międzynarodowa Street. It intersects with Katowicka, Kryniczna, Zakopiańska, Poselska, Francuska, Alliance Square, Aldony, Wandy, Jan Styka, Alfred Nobel, Saska, Niekłańska, and Międzynarodowa streets. The street is two-way and single-carriageway throughout, with dedicated turning lanes onto Wał Miedzeszyński and Francuska streets. It has no bike lanes. City bus routes operate along the street.

== History ==
Originally named August III Street, Zwycięzców Street was mentioned in a 1925 municipal technical department project planning a commercial area at its intersection with Saska Street. Pavement and sidewalks were laid in 1938. During the 1939 defense of Warsaw, a barricade stood at the intersection with Francuska Street. After the German occupation, the Warsaw Reconstruction Office preserved the street's transportation role.

Some buildings date to the interwar period, such as 1928 houses from the Saska Colony. Polish People's Republic-era construction includes Saska Kępa I estate (1960, between Angorska, Międzynarodowa, Saska, and Zwycięzców streets, designed by Arnold Majorek) and Saska Kępa II estate (between Międzynarodowa, Zwycięzców, Paryska streets, and Łazienki Route). A late-20th century example is a 2000 apartment building at the corner of Zwycięzców and Międzynarodowa streets, designed by Jacek Zielonka.

== Notable buildings ==
- 7/9 Zwycięzców Street: School Complex No. 77, including Bolesław Prus High School with Bilingual Sections (formerly also Junior High School No. 19). Designed by Barbara and Hieronim Karpowicz before socialist realism (1949), the building features a characteristic brick facade decoration (1953–1954). On the Katowicka Street side is a relief of the Mermaid of Warsaw by Wojciech Czerwosz. A bust of school patron Bolesław Prus by Stanisław Sikora stands in front, unveiled 19 May 1983.
- 10 Zwycięzców Street: Genzl family villa from 1938, designed by Kazimierz Rafalski.
- 11 Zwycięzców Street: On its Katowicka Street wall is the relief Harvest by Jerzy Jarnuszkiewicz, one of the last preserved elements of 1940s Katowicka Street decoration. Listed as a historical monument in 2011 and restored.
- 12 Zwycięzców Street: Embassy of Azerbaijan.
- 15 Zwycięzców Street: Former Retro Corner known for interior decor, briefly Solidarity Electoral Action office; now an art gallery, consignment shop, and restaurant.
- 19 Zwycięzców Street: Multi-family house from 1935, designed by Stanisław Barylski.
- 2 Francuska Street (corner of Zwycięzców Street): Łepkowski villa (1933–1934) by Lucjan Korngold and Piotr Maria Lubiński. Features a large garden terrace accessed by winding stairs, praised as realizing Le Corbusier's ideas. Currently houses Bose International Planning and Architecture.
- 29 Zwycięzców Street: Embassy of Columbia.
- 30 Zwycięzców Street: Multi-family house from 1937, designed by Leonard Kario.
- 31 Zwycięzców Street: Multi-family house from 1935, designed by Roman Feliński. Home of Wanda Grodecka, a Warsaw Uprising medic; in 1944, her apartment sheltered three insurgents brought by Julian Ambroziewicz.
- 34 Zwycięzców Street: Headquarters of the Ministry of Justice Department of Legal Professions and Access to Legal Aid.
- 39 Zwycięzców Street: Apartment 10, home of Witold Lutosławski from 1946 to 1968.
- 44 Zwycięzców Street: School Complex No. 84, including Wiktor Gomulicki Primary School No. 168 and Czesław Niemen Junior High School No. 25 with Bilingual Sections.
- 46 Zwycięzców Street: Post Office No. 111.

== Gallery ==
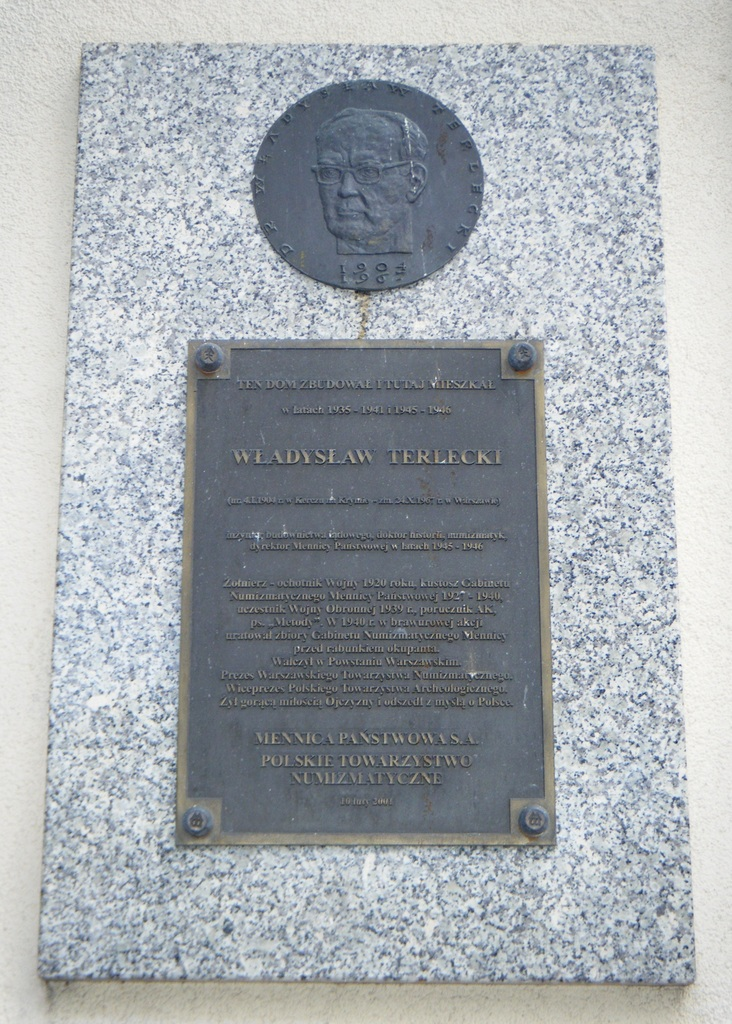
20 Zwycięzców Street: Memorial plaque

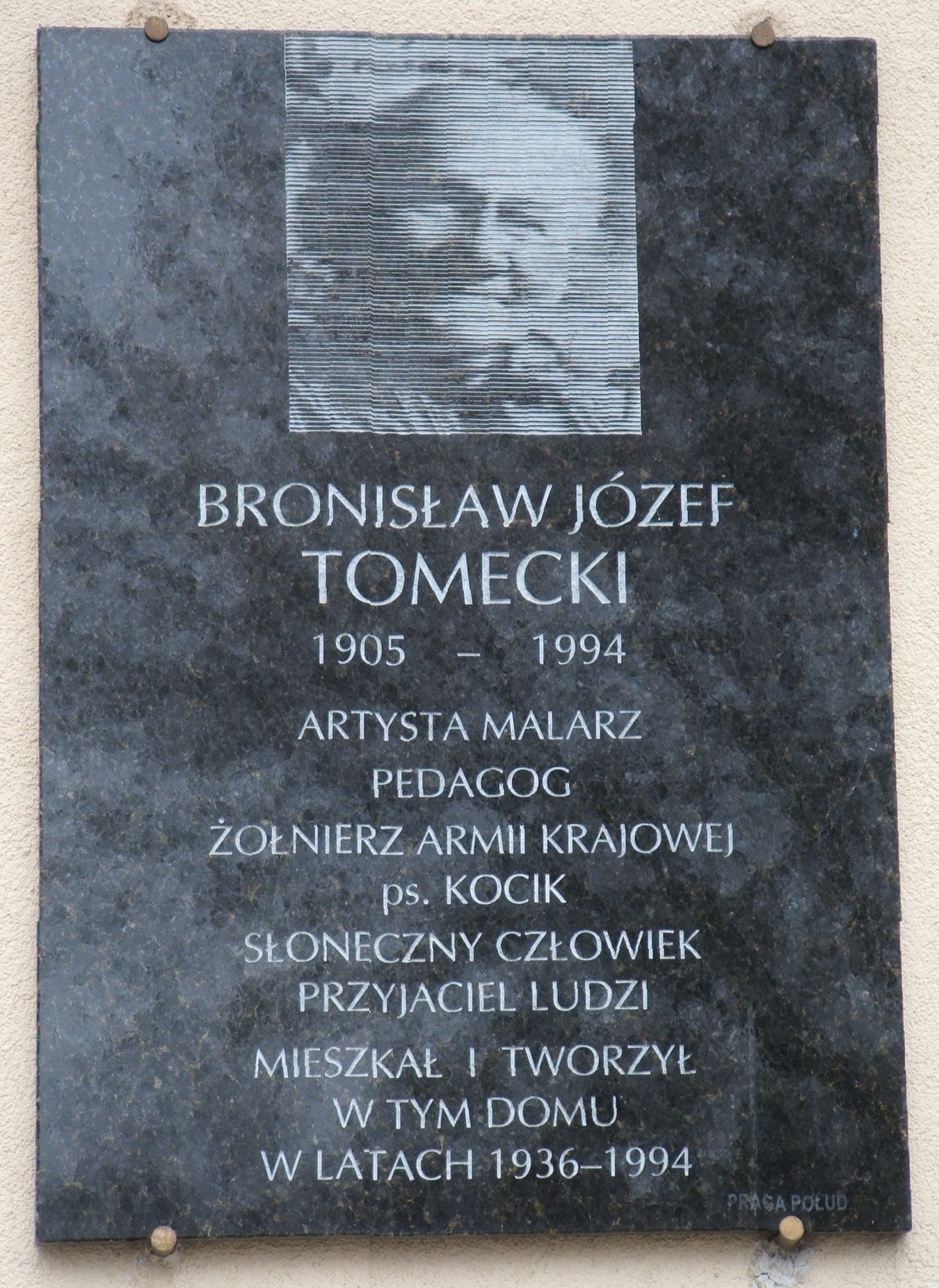
20 Zwycięzców Street: Memorial plaque

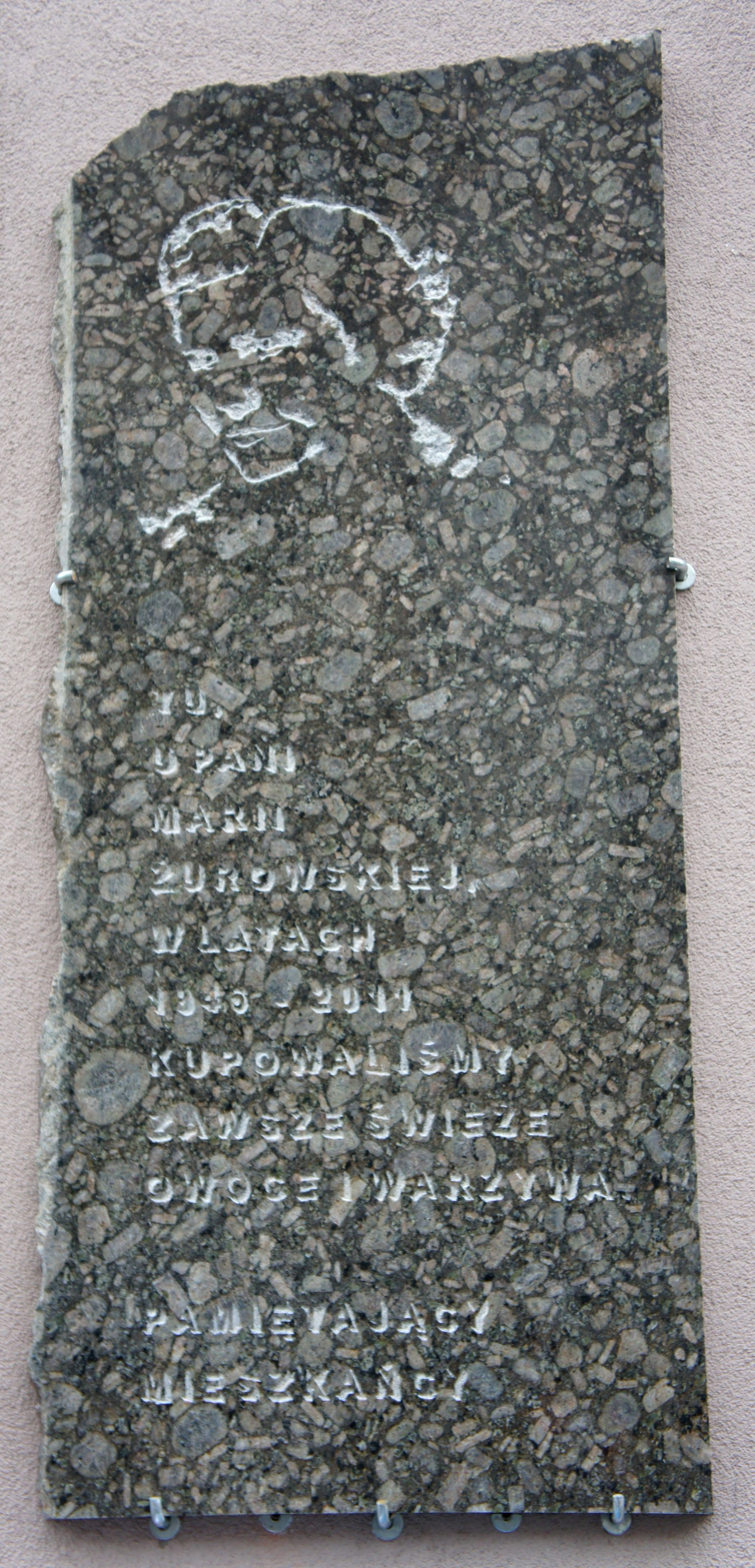
22 Zwycięzców Street: Memorial plaque

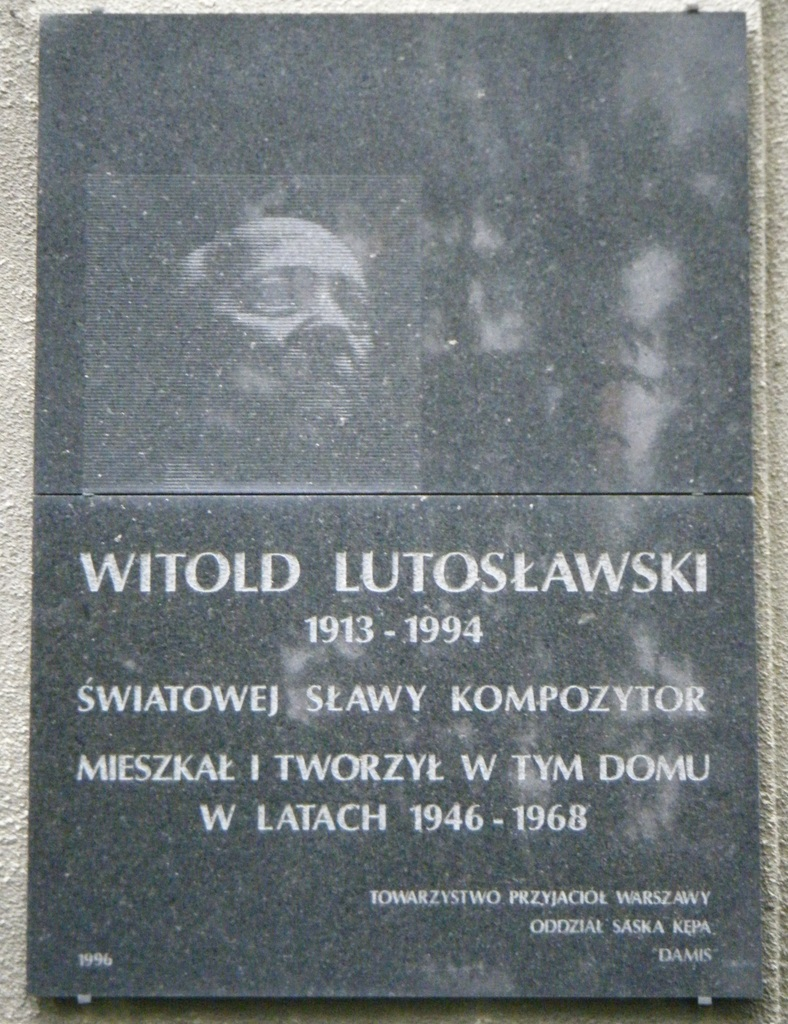
39 Zwycięzców Street: Memorial plaque

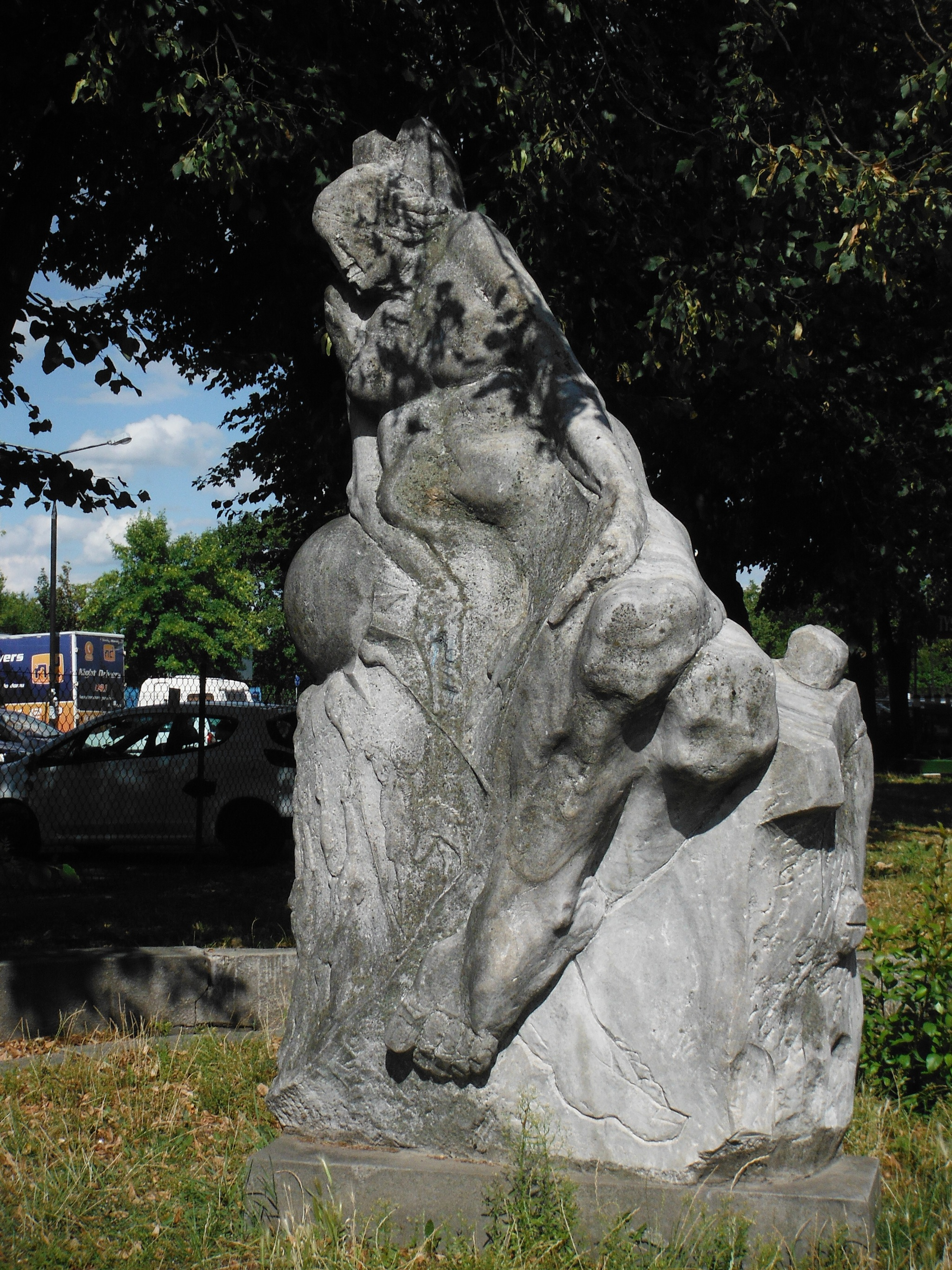
Majestat Wszechżycia by Ryszard Wojciechowski

== Bibliography ==
- Faryna-Paszkiewicz, Hanna (2001). Saska Kępa (in Polish). Warsaw: Murator. ISBN 83-915407-0-7.
