= Saska Street =

Street in Warsaw, Poland

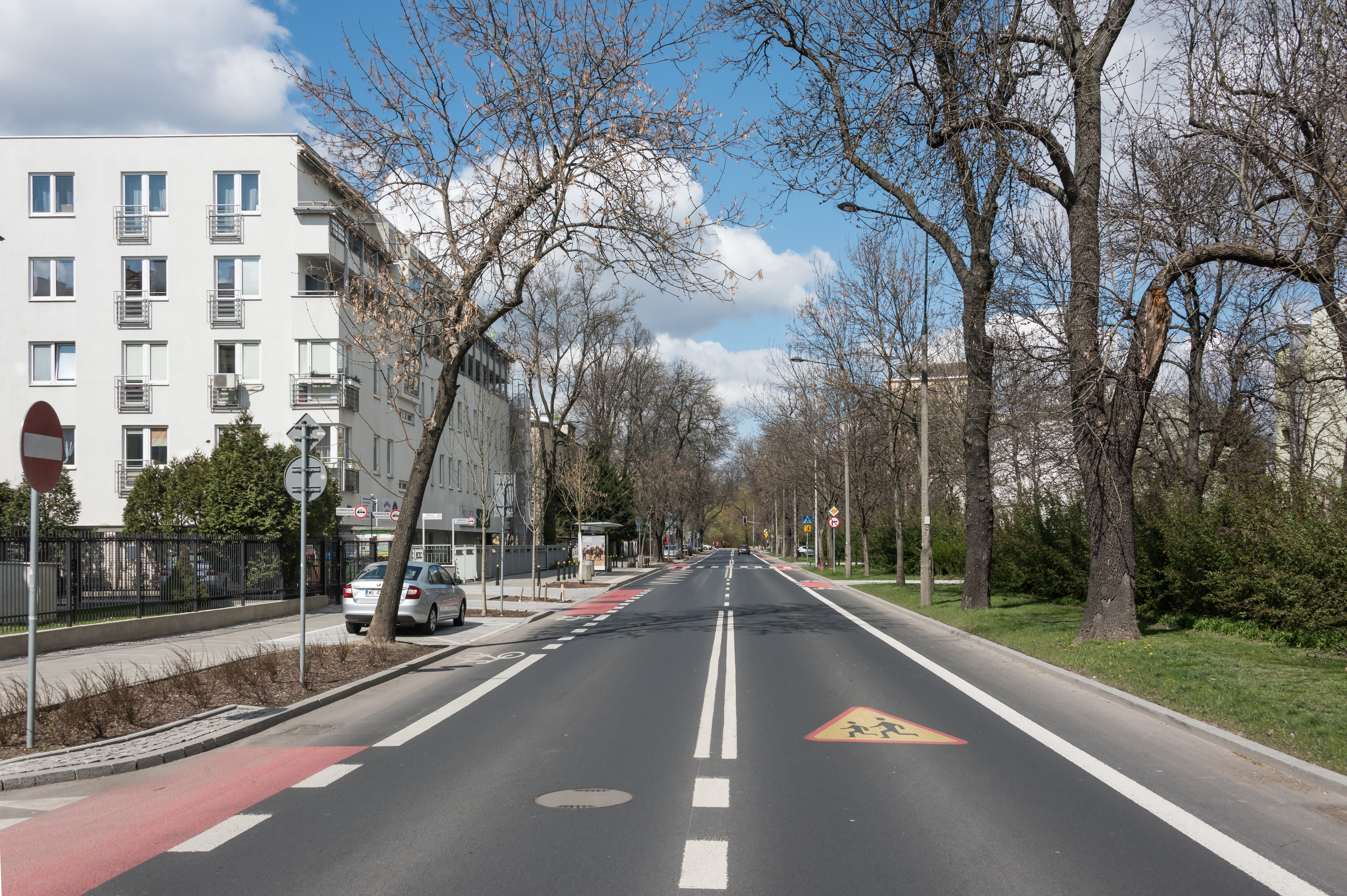
- Saska Street at the intersection with Irlandzka Street
- Interactive map of Saska Street
- Part of: Saska Kępa
- Length: 1.7 km (1.1 mi)
- Location: Warsaw, Poland
- Coordinates: 52°13′55.3″N 21°3′39.5″E
- From: Ateńska Street
- Major junctions: Drezdeńska Street; Lotaryńska Street (270 m); Lizbońska Street / Argentyńska Street (335 m); Stanów Zjednoczonych Avenue (470 m); Kubańska Street (630 m); Brazylijska Street (710 m); Meksykańska Street (800 m); Zwycięzców Street (910 m); Obrońców Street; Walecznych Street (1,300 m); Irlandzka Street (1,470 m); Angorska Street / Dąbrówki Street (1,560 m); Adampolska Street
- To: George Washington Avenue

Saska Street is a street in the Saska Kępa neighborhood of the Praga-Południe district in Warsaw, Poland. It stretches from Ateńska Street to George Washington Avenue.

The street's name refers to the Saxon dynasty, whose members once leased the Saska Kępa area. The same name was used until 1847 for a neighboring street near the Saxon Garden in Warsaw. The street is primarily lined with residential buildings, many from the interwar period, as well as commercial establishments and schools.

== History ==
Saska Street was mentioned in a 1925 plan by the Warsaw Magistrate's Technical Department, which proposed creating a commercial area at the intersection of Zwycięzców Street and Saska Street. Designed as a major thoroughfare, the street was lined with double rows of trees and wide sidewalks, constructed in 1938. A wide green strip between the carriageway and sidewalk remains as evidence of a planned tram line intended to connect George Washington Avenue with Gocław. Several buildings from the 1930s survive, including a house at 101 Saska Street, believed to have served as an insurgent field hospital in Saska Kępa from August to October 1944.

Postwar construction occurred partly during the Polish People's Republic era, including the Saska Kępa I and Saska Kępa II estates. Later construction, after 1989, includes a building at 105 Saska Street (1995–1998).

== Notable buildings ==
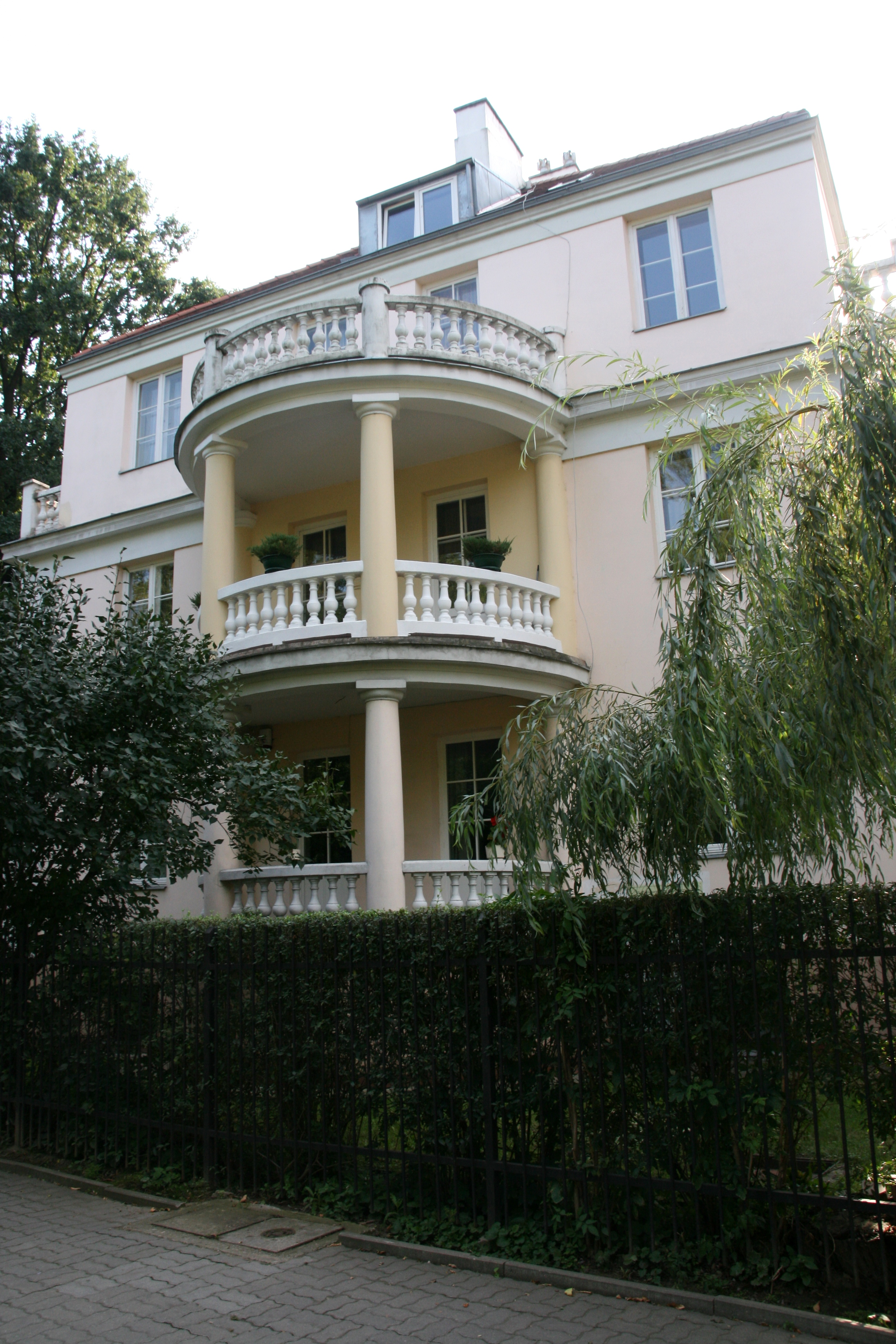
House at 101 Saska Street

- Building at 27 Stanów Zjednoczonych Avenue (entrance from Saska Street) – Stefan Starzyński Primary School No. 143. In front of the building stands the Stefan Starzyński Monument by Ludwika Nitschowa, relocated from the Saxon Garden in 2008. The school houses works by Janusz Wilden, who donated his artistic collection to the school in 1990.
- Building at 59 Saska Street – Adam Mickiewicz High School, continuing the tradition of a school founded in the 19th century by Emilian Konopczyński, one of Warsaw's oldest secondary schools. The building was designed by Mieczysław Krwawicz.
- Building at 61 Saska Street – A medical clinic designed by Hanna Downarowicz-Żurkowska.
- Building at 63/75 Saska Street – A building designed by Andrzej Gałkowski, serving as the Regional Blood Donation and Blood Treatment Center since 1964, when it was relocated from Katowicka Street.
- Building at 72 Saska Street – A 1938 multi-family house designed by Stanisław Bukowiński.
- Roman Catholic church at 16 Alfred Nobel Street (also accessible from Saska Street) – Church of St. Andrew Bobola of the Parish of Our Lady of Perpetual Help. Initially designed between 1938 and 1939 by Piotr Lubiński and Henryk Wąsowicz, it was completed between 1948 and 1949 based on designs by Józef Łowiński and Jan Bogusławski. The facade and interior reflect Gothic influences. The interior features wall paintings by Maria and Jerzy Ostrowski and sculptures by Tadeusz Świerczek. The building is listed in the Registry of Cultural Property under number 956 A. The same address houses the Ecole Française privée Antoine de Saint-Exupéry preschool.
- Ognisko Pracy Pozaszkolnej No. 2 at 18/26 Alfred Nobel Street (also accessible from Saska Street), formerly the XIV Jordan Garden. Since 2010, it features a new building with a computer room and gym. The structure's design allows the roof to be used by children for sledding in winter. Since 2012, the garden has been home to the successor of the Royal Oak (Saski Oak), originally located at 4 Francuska Street before the war.
- Building at 101 Saska Street – A 1935 house listed in the Registry of Cultural Property under number 1282-A. It features elements of the manorial style, such as white balustrades, column-supported balconies, and triangular pediments. It is the likely location of an insurgent field hospital operating in Saska Kępa from August to October 1944.
- Building at 103 Saska Street – A house where General Stanisław Bułak-Bałachowicz lived before World War II. It was reprivatized in 1994 under the Bierut Decree.
- Building at 78 Saska Street – School Complex No. 21, comprising the General Leopold Okulicki LXXXVII High School, Professor Józef Zawadzki Technical School No. 27, and Post-Secondary School No. 1. The building also houses the headquarters of the Młodzież Polska Youth Assistance Association.
- Building at 2 Angorska Street (corner of Saska Street) – Ignacy Jan Paderewski Bilingual Gymnasium No. 18, formerly Ignacy Jan Paderewski Primary School No. 15, and from 1959 to 1990 named after Marian Buczek.
- Building at 98 Saska Street – A multi-family house from around 1937.
- Building at 100 Saska Street – Headquarters of the Court Bailiff Office at the District Court for Warsaw Praga-Południe.
- Building at 109 Saska Street – The house in which Władysław Gomułka lived between 1955 and 1965. This fact was commemorated by a plaque unveiled on 30 April 1985. Over time, however, the plaque was removed.
- Building at 111 Saska Street – A 1991 villa designed by Waldemar Szczerba and Ryszard Tomasik, featuring bay windows, brick cladding, and an oculus.

== Gallery ==
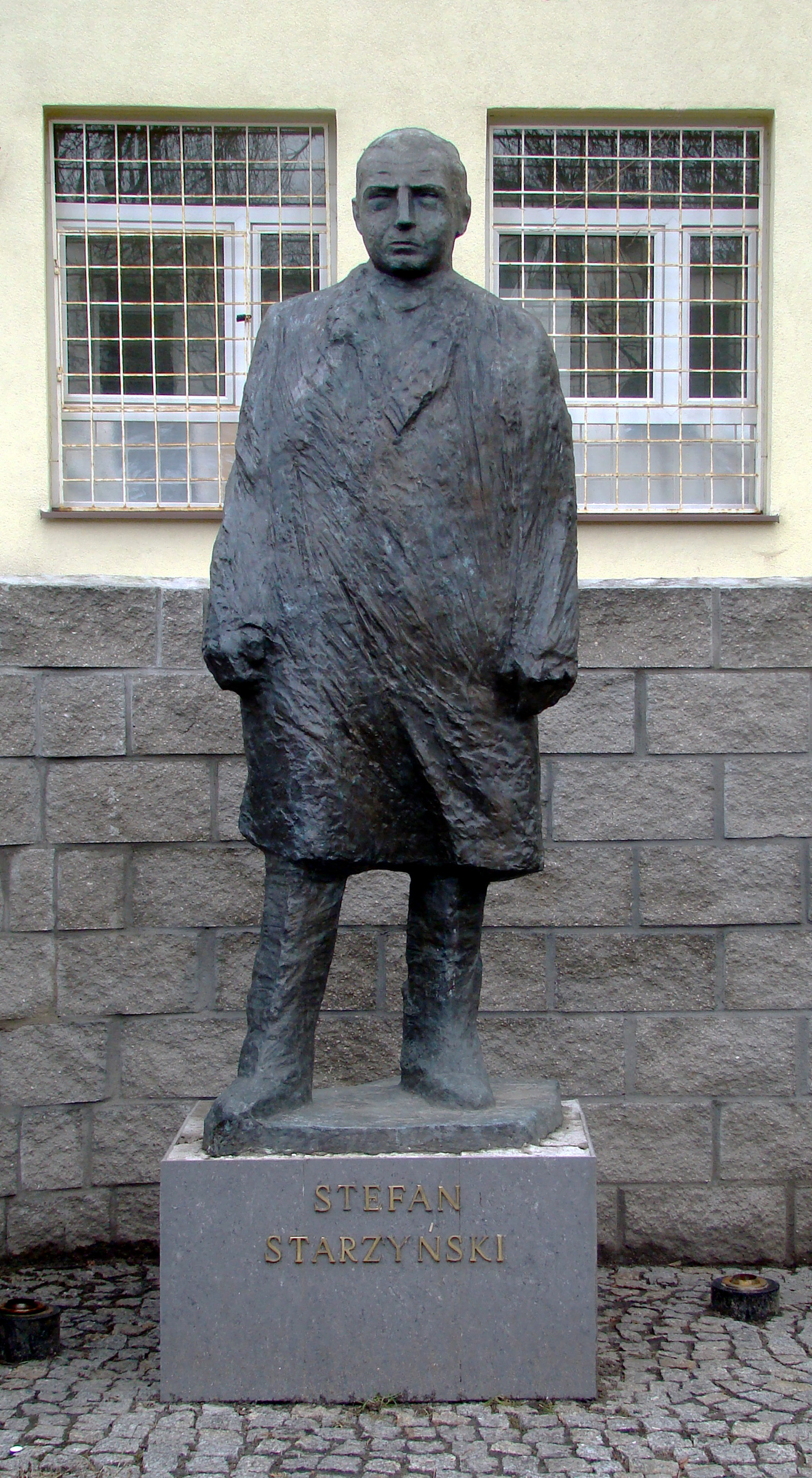
Stefan Starzyński Monument

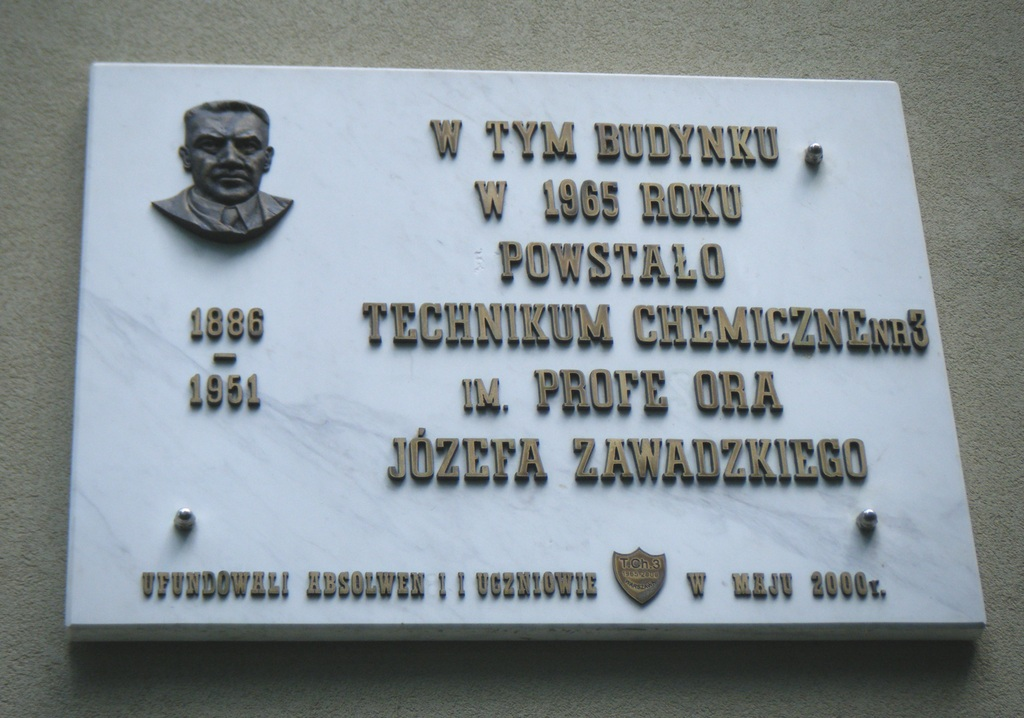
78 Saska Street: Commemorative plaque

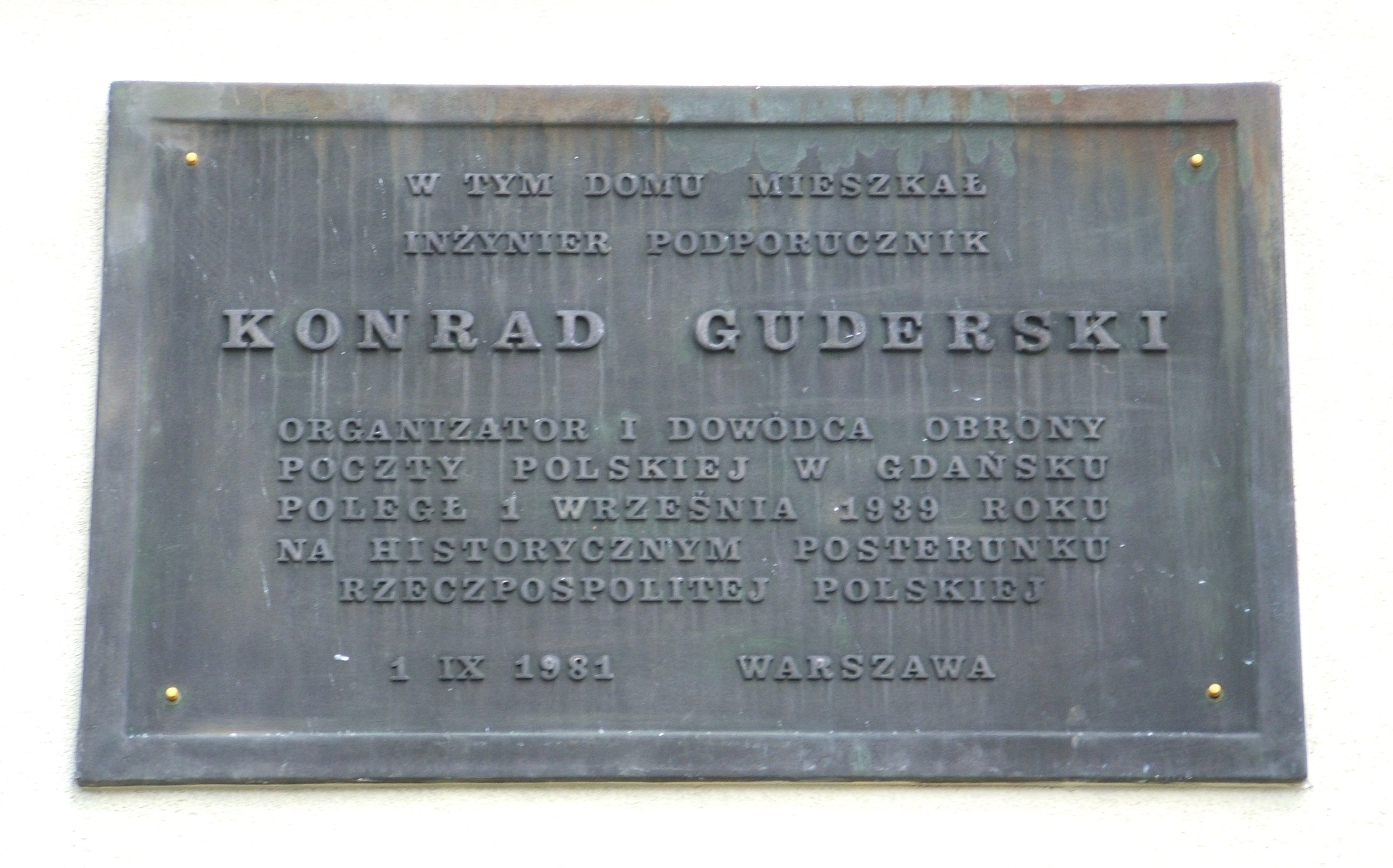
68 Saska Street: Commemorative plaque

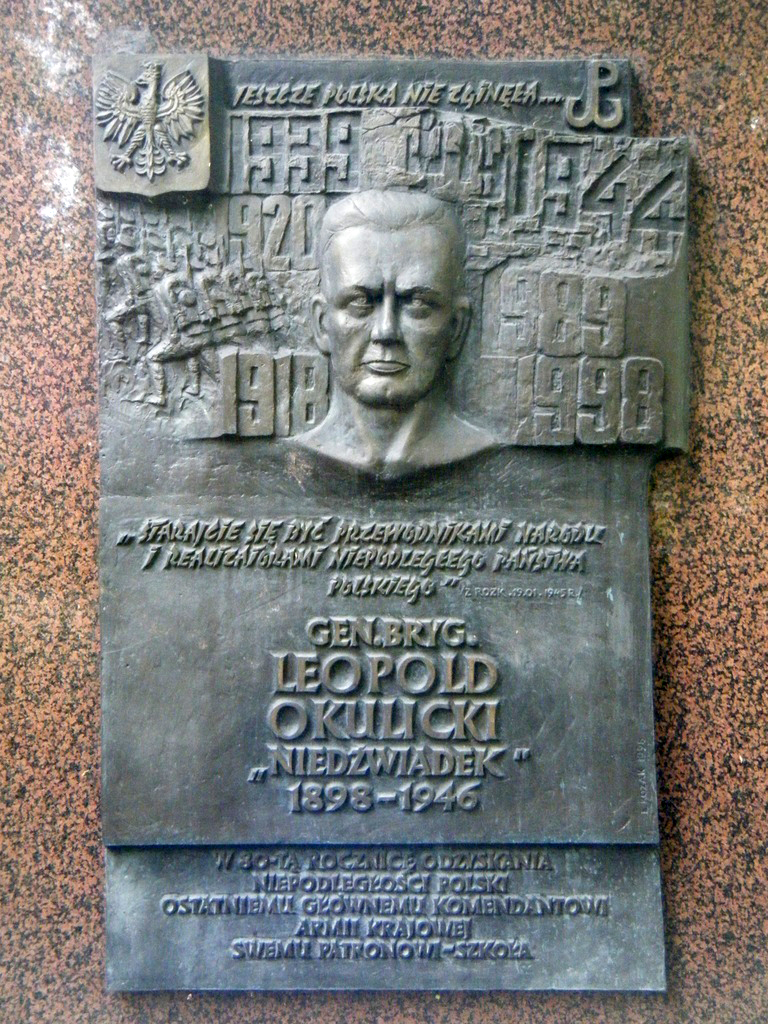
78 Saska Street: Commemorative plaque

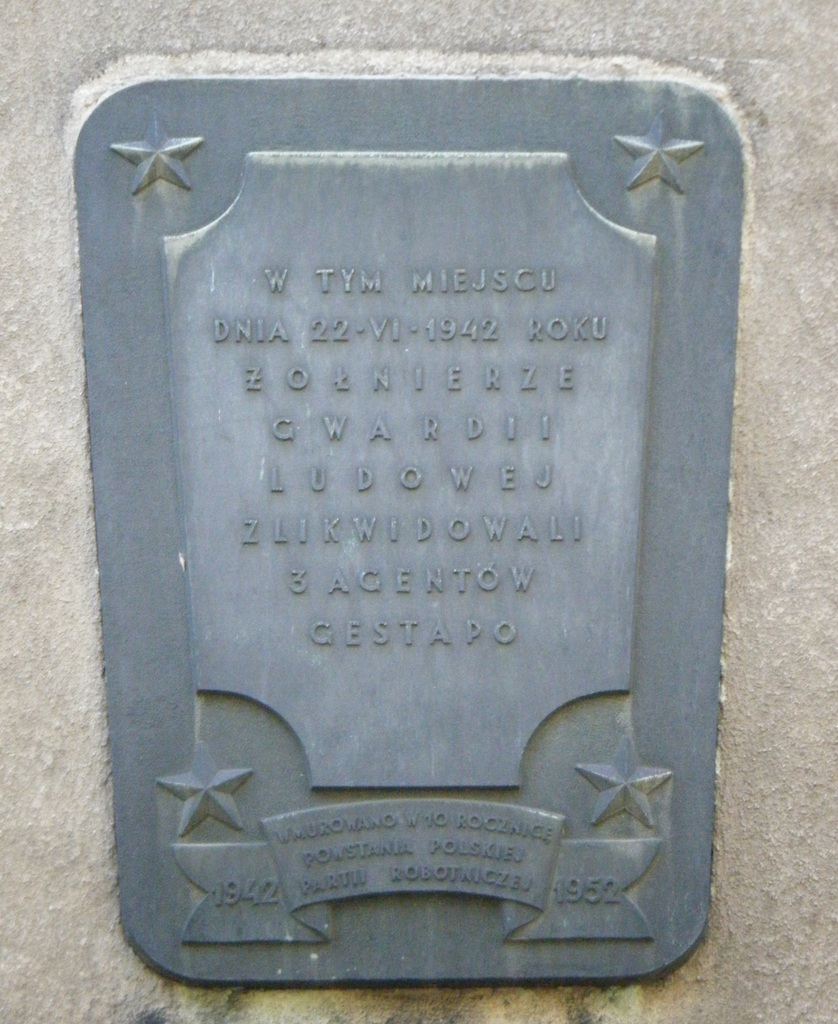
91 Saska Street: Commemorative plaque

== Bibliography ==
- Faryna-Paszkiewicz, Hanna (2001). Saska Kępa (in Polish). Warsaw: Murator. ISBN 83-915407-0-7.
