= Walecznych Street =

Street in Warsaw, Poland

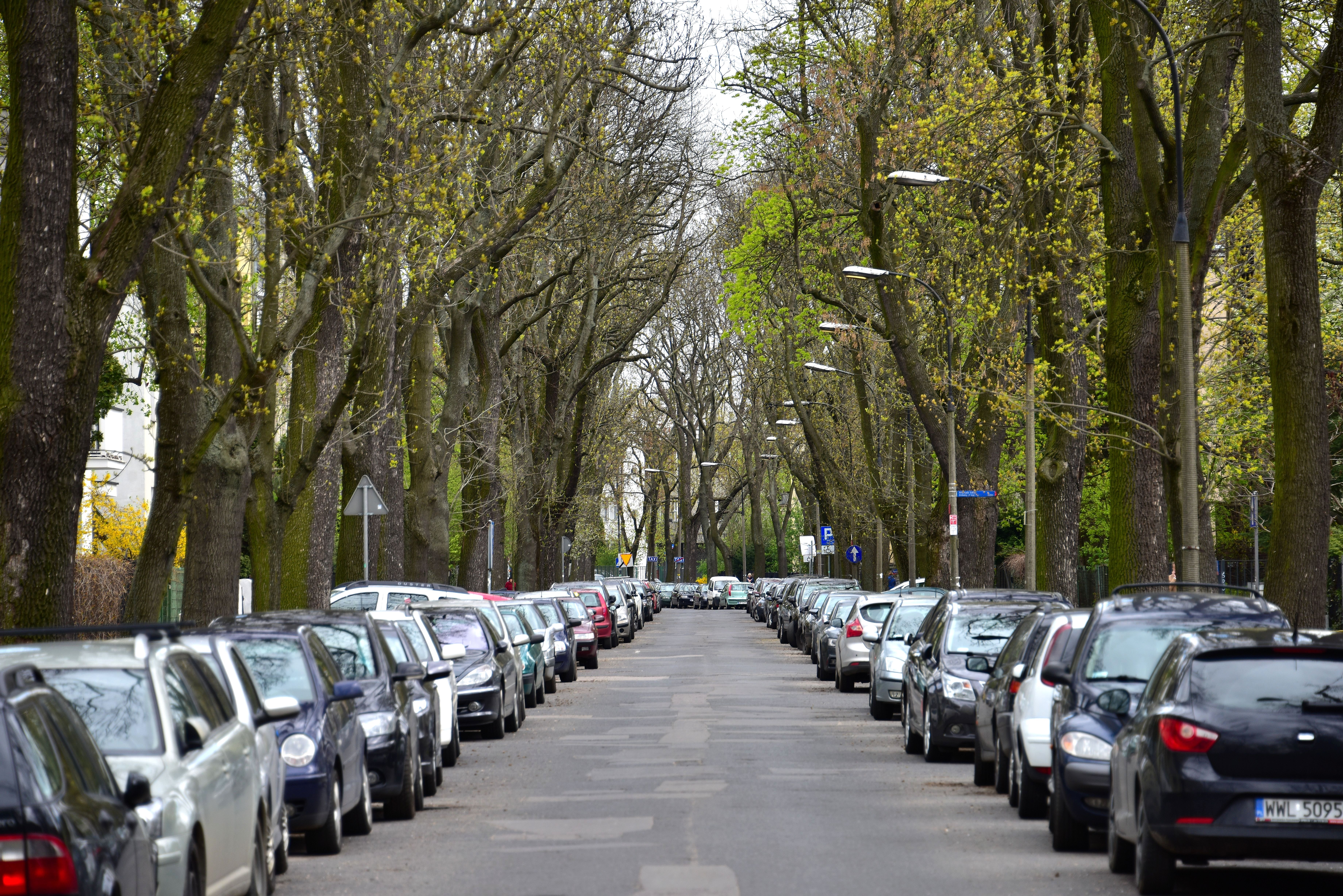
- Walecznych Street at Dąbrowiecka Street
- Interactive map of Walecznych Street
- Part of: Saska Kępa
- Location: Warsaw, Poland
- Coordinates: 52°14′06.4″N 21°03′23.7″E
- From: Łotewska Street
- Major junctions: Dąbrowiecka Street; Katowicka Street; Gruzińska Street; Poselska Street; Francuska Street; Królowej Aldony Street; Dąbrówki Street; Jan Styka Street; Irlandzka Street; Alfred Nobel Street; Saska Street; Niekłańska Street; Peszteńska Street; Londyńska Street
- To: Międzynarodowa Street

Walecznych Street is a street in the Saska Kępa neighborhood of the Praga-Południe district in Warsaw, Poland. It runs perpendicular to the Vistula river, stretching from Wał Miedzeszyński Street to the Exhibition Canal.

The street is primarily lined with residential buildings, including several from the interwar period, four of which are listed in the Registry of Cultural Property.

The street's name, meaning "Valiant", refers to Poland's struggles for independence during World War I, consistent with the naming convention of nearby streets such as Obrońców Street (Defenders Street) and Zwycięzców Street (Victors Street).

== History ==
Walecznych Street is located in one of the oldest parts of Saska Kępa. Its name was officially designated by a Warsaw City Council resolution on 27 September 1926. Much of the development between Wał Miedzeszyński Street and Saska Street dates to the 1930s. A wooden house at 37 Walecznych Street, a remnant of Olenders architecture, is a notable historical feature. After the German occupation, the Warsaw Reconstruction Office preserved the street's existing transportation role.

Following World War II, Walecznych Street became home to artists such as painter Jan Cybis, photographer Leonard Sempoliński, and his son, painter Jacek Sempoliński. The street also housed the collection of furniture, weapons, paintings, and artistic crafts of Tadeusz Wierzejski. Public institutions and private companies host activities such as city games and guided walking tours on the street.

== Notable buildings ==
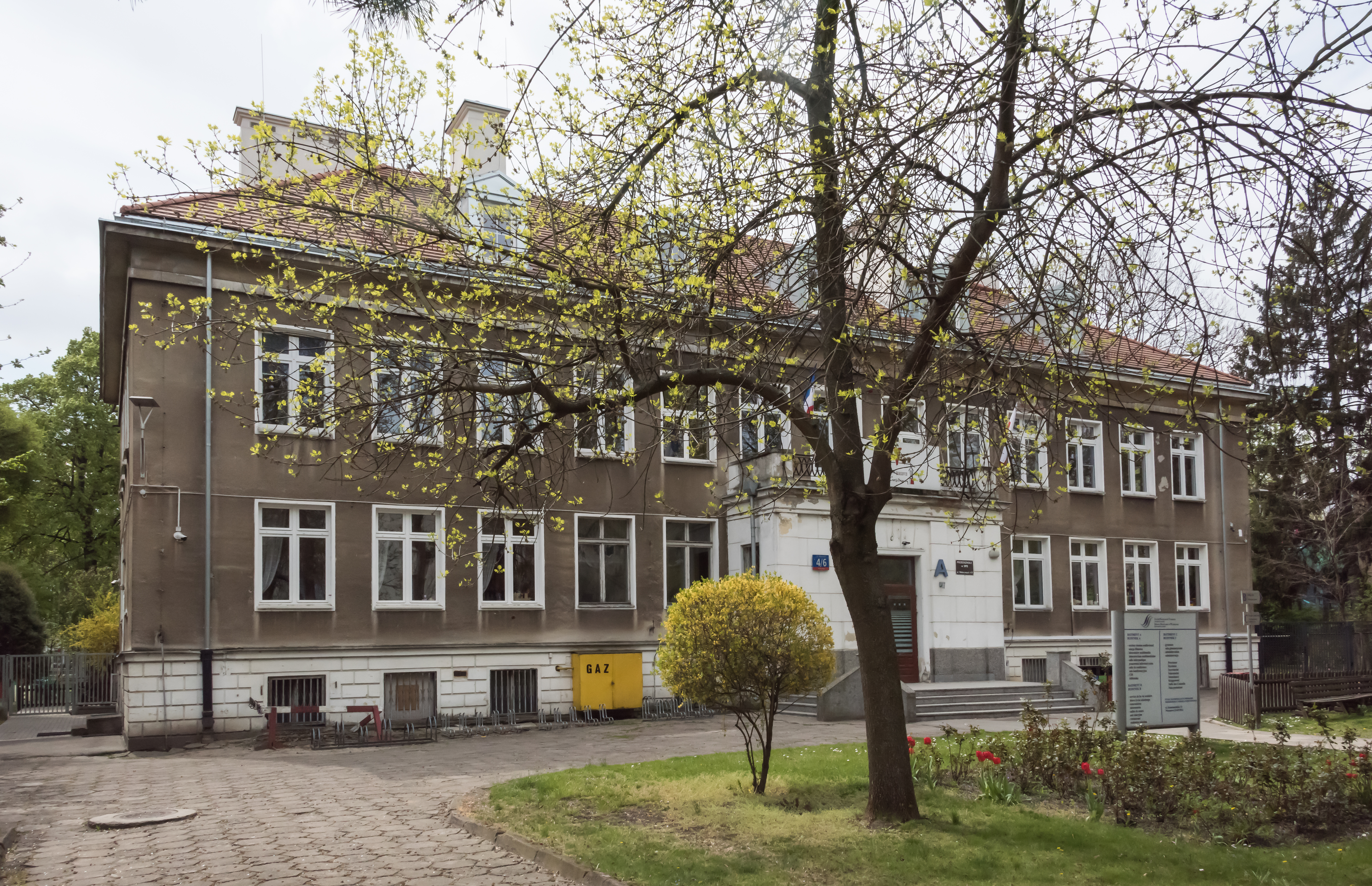
4/6 Walecznych Street

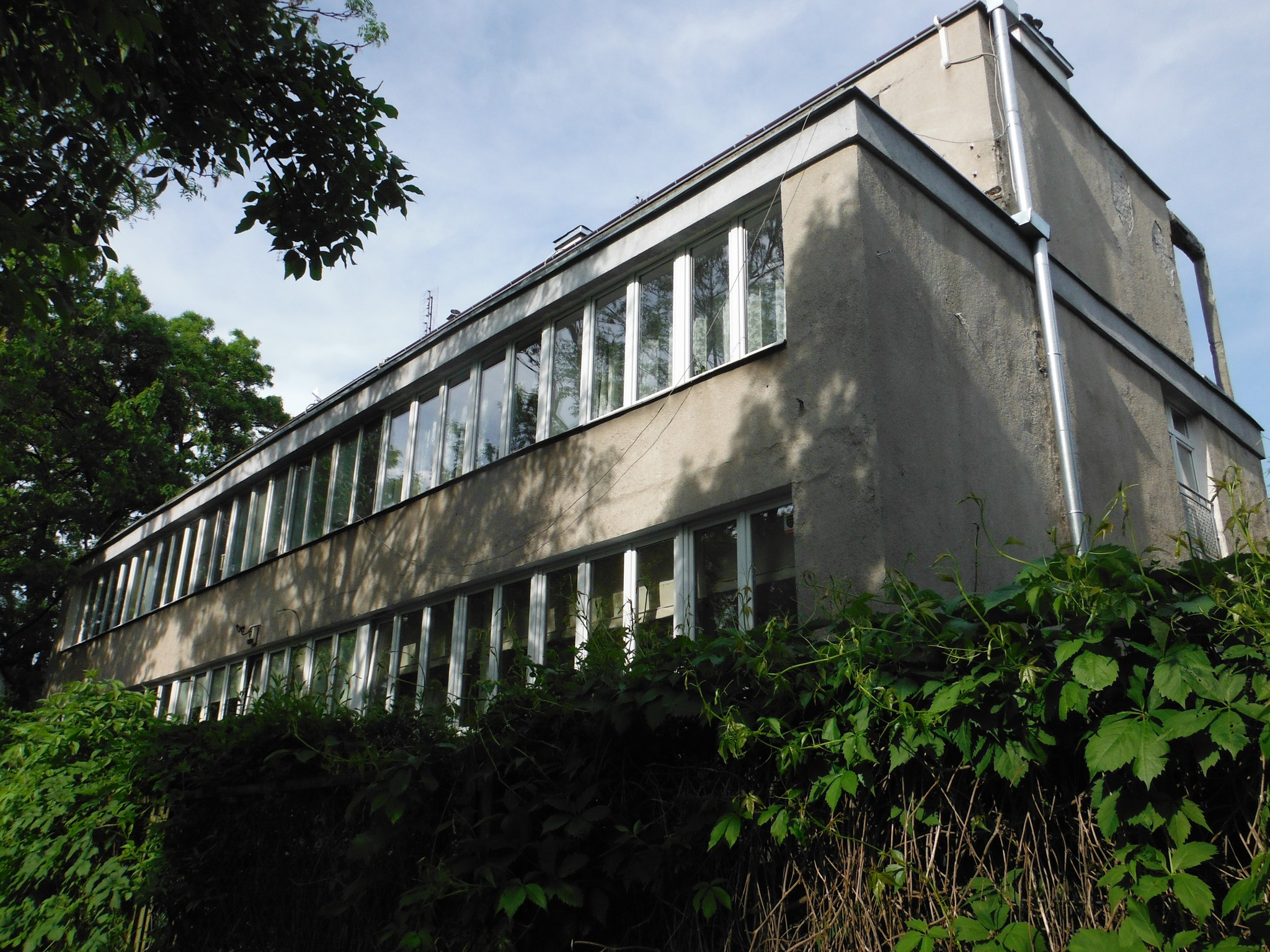
12 Walecznych Street

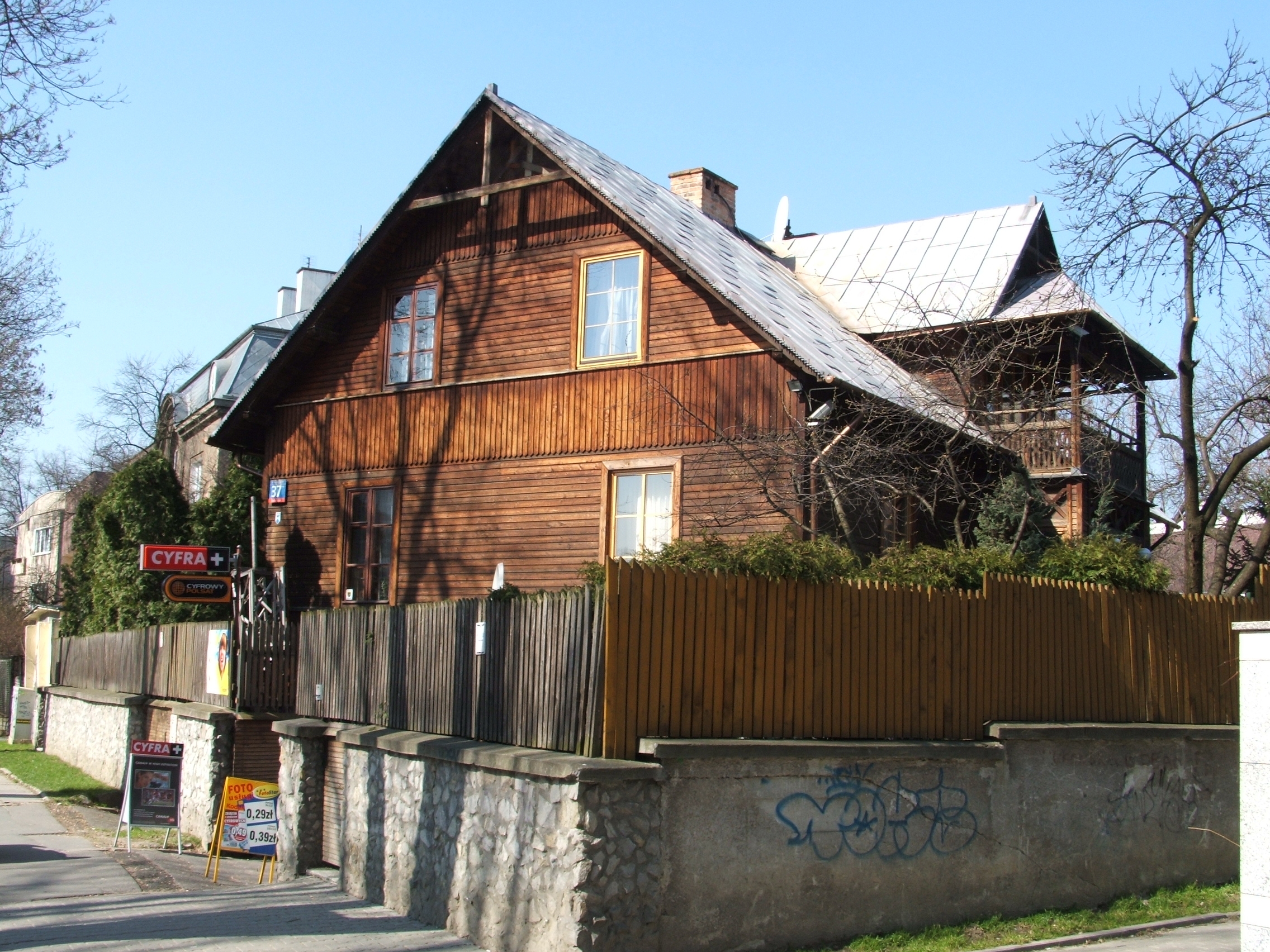
37 Walecznych Street

- 3 Walecznych Street: A multi-family house built between 1935 and 1936, designed by Stanisław Barylski, owned by the Klimaszewski family. It has a distinctive corner balcony.
- 4/6 Walecznych Street: The building of the René Goscinny French High School. Since 2013, a bust of René Goscinny has stood in front of the building.
- 7 Walecznych Street: A house that was the site of one of Saska Kępa's earliest cultural institutions, a painting and drawing school led by Professor Bolesław Kuźmiński.
- 9 Walecznych Street: A multi-family house from 1935, designed by Stanisław Barylski.
- 11 Walecznych Street: A tenement villa from around 1936, designed by Bolesław Szmidt and Remigiusz Ostoja-Chodkowski. It contains functionalist elements such as a staircase with large glass panels and mesh balustrades, combined with monumentalist high ground floor and symmetrical composition. The building is listed in the Registry of Cultural Property.
- 12 Walecznych Street: The Krzymuski family house, designed by Helena Syrkus and Szymon Syrkus. The elongated structure, oriented north-south for optimal lighting, contains a low, slightly recessed ground floor clad in clinker tiles and a recessed top floor with a long terrace.
- 16 Walecznych Street: Former home of Julian Lisiecki.
- 17 Walecznych Street: A multi-family house from 1936, designed by Stanisław Barylski, listed in the Registry of Cultural Property.
- 18 Walecznych Street: A multi-family house from 1935, designed by Konstanty Jakimowicz.
- 19 Walecznych Street: A house from around 1930, listed in the Registry of Cultural Property.
- 21 Walecznych Street: A multi-family house from around 1937, designed by Zygmunt Konrad and Leonard Kario.
- 22 Walecznych Street: A multi-family house from 1938, designed by Leonard Kario.
- 25 Walecznych Street: The Day Center of the Warsaw Branch of the Polish Association for Persons with Intellectual Disability.
- 27 Walecznych Street: Home of photographer Leonard Sempoliński from 1945 to 1988.
- 28 Walecznych Street: Home of painter Jan Cybis from 1945 to 1957. After 1984, it housed the Saska Kępa gallery, run by sculptor Grażyna Roman, which provided exhibition space for artists facing censorship.
- 30 Walecznych Street: A house that was used as a military medical post during the defense of Warsaw in September 1939.
- 34 and 36 Walecznych Street: A multi-family house from 1936, designed by Maksymilian Goldberg and Hipolit Rutkowski. It features a series of loggias, resembling a seaside resort with porthole windows and long terraces characteristic of the Streamline Moderne style. Zigzag window placements, characteristic of 1930s architectural trends, are intended to improvethe lighting; the neighboring house at 28 Francuska Street has similar zigzag bay windows.
- 36A Walecznych Street: A multi-family house from 1936, designed by Henryk Oderfeld, built on a trapezoidal plan to fit the plot. Its characteristic features include windows, a curved corner and a garden-facing terrace.
- 37 Walecznych Street: A wooden house from around 1880, listed in the Registry of Cultural Property. Built on a terp, it originally belonged to the Przybytkowski family, later the Szenk family. Known as the "oldest house in Saska Kępa", it was largely reconstructed in the 1970s. It reflects Olenders heritage, with its orientation predating the street grid.
- 38 Walecznych Street: A multi-family house from around 1938, designed by Henryk Szlagórski, with an entrance canopy.
- 59 Walecznych Street: The Praga Child and Family Center named after Alina Margolis-Edelman, operated by the Nobody's Children Foundation.
- 62 Walecznych Street: A three-story residential building constructed between 2007 and 2008, designed by Bulanda & Mucha Architects. Reminiscent of interwar villas, it received a distinction in the SARP Award of the Year competition in 2007 and was nominated for the European Union Prize for Contemporary Architecture in 2009.

== Gallery ==
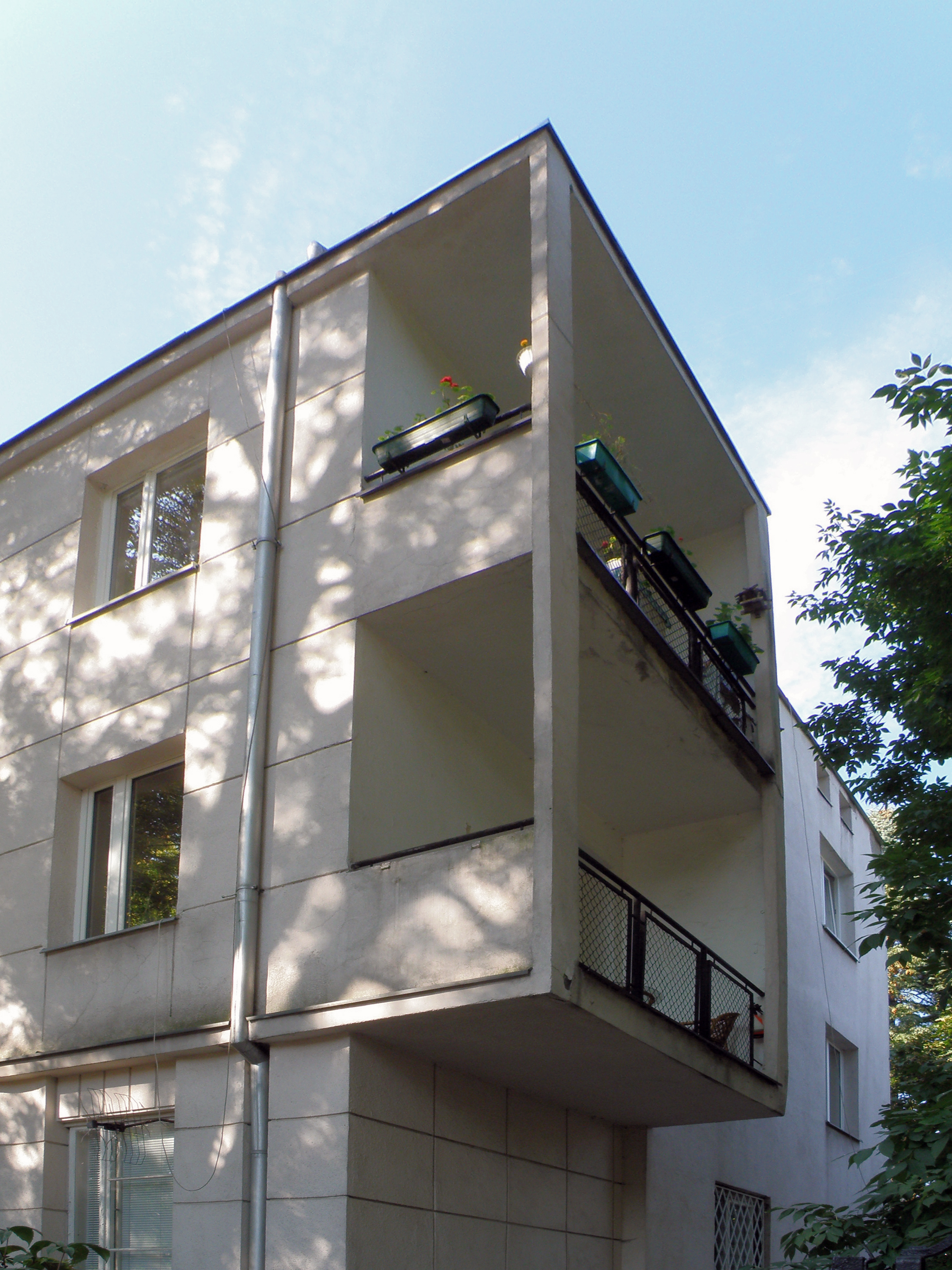
11 Walecznych Street

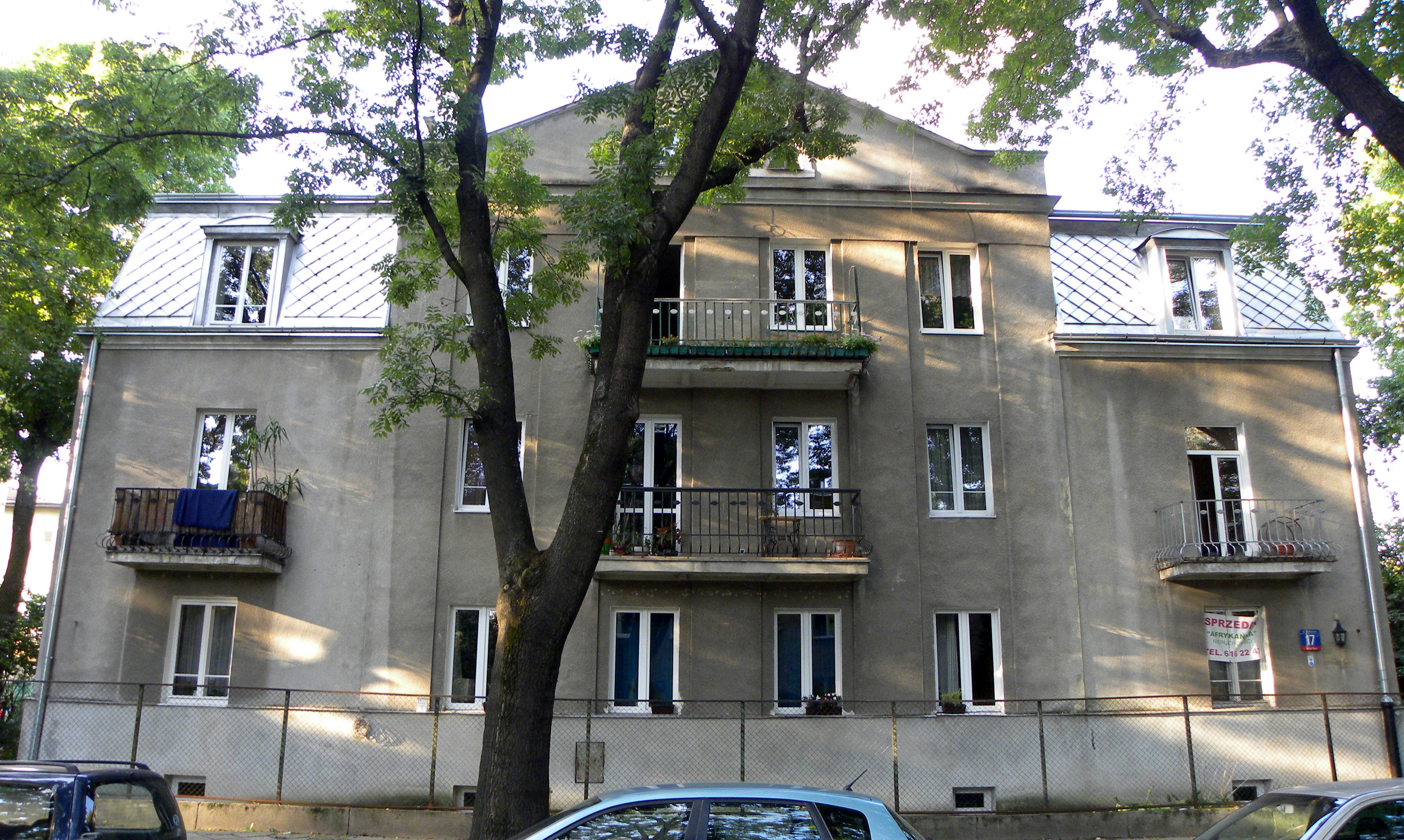
17 Walecznych Street

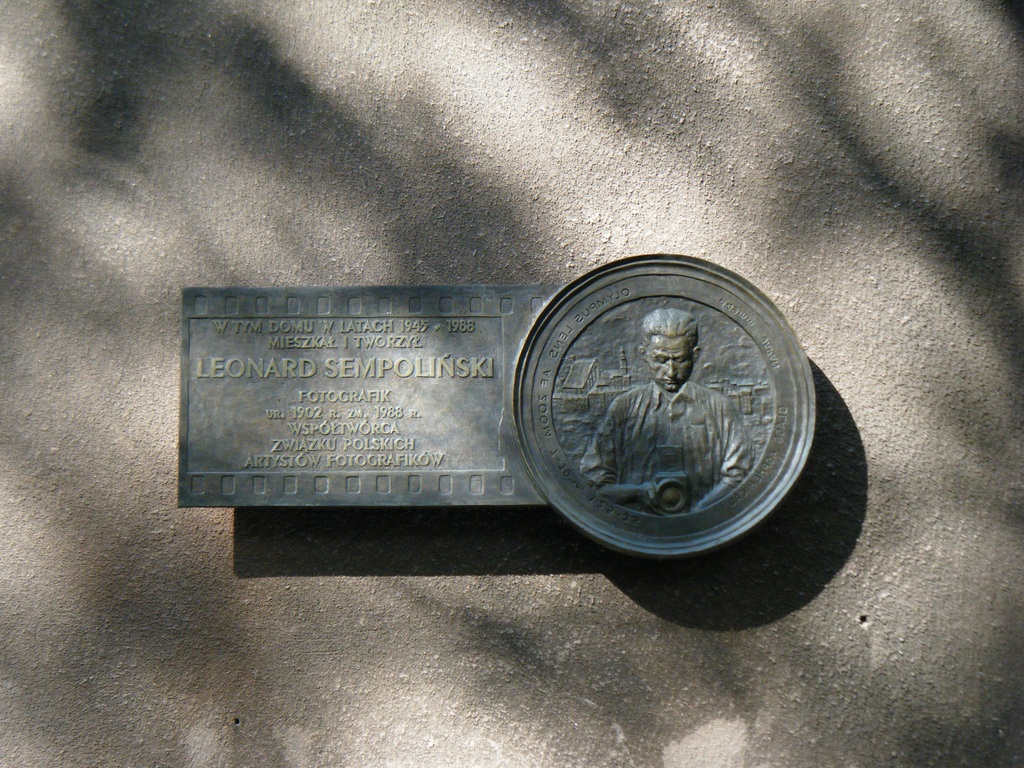
27 Walecznych Street: Memorial plaque

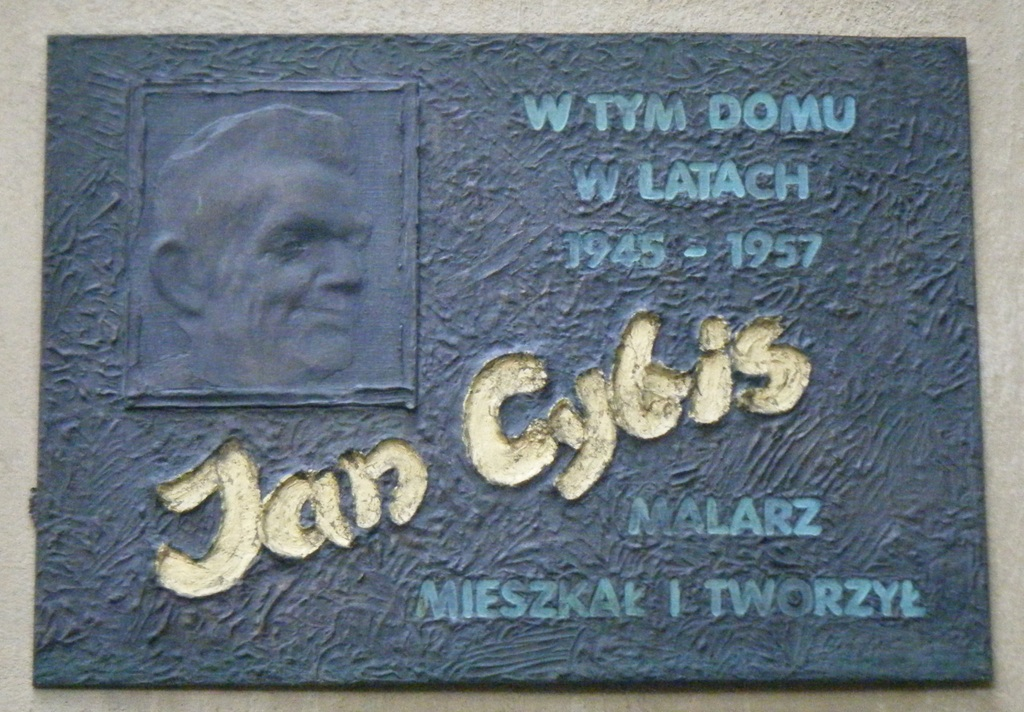
28 Walecznych Street: Memorial plaque

== Bibliography ==
- Faryna-Paszkiewicz, Hanna (2001). Saska Kępa (in Polish). Warsaw: Murator. ISBN 83-915407-0-7.
