= Międzynarodowa Street =

Street in Warsaw, Poland

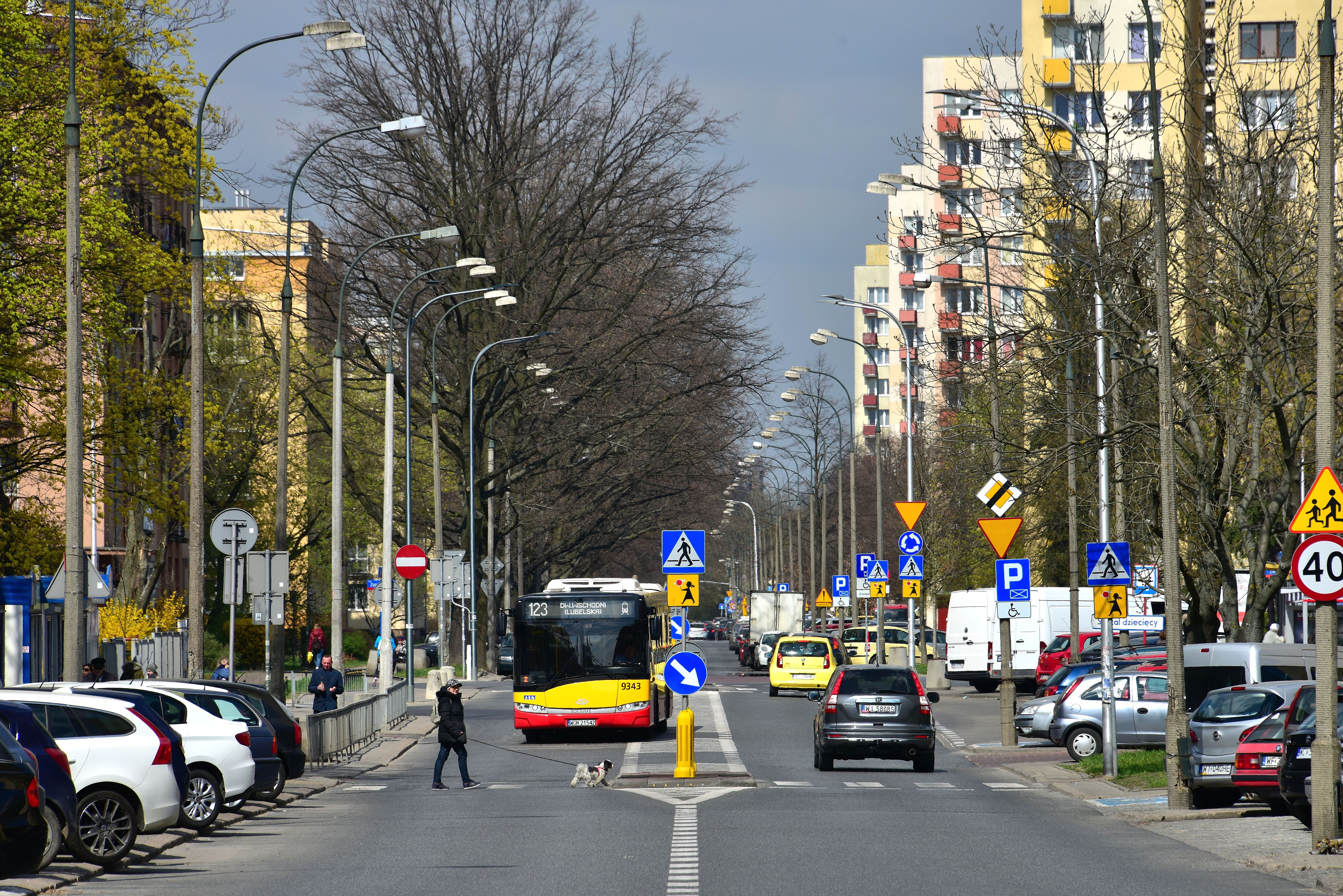
- Międzynarodowa Street at the intersection with Brazylijska Street, view toward the north
- Part of: Saska Kępa, Kamionek
- Length: 1,950 m (6,400 ft)
- Location: Warsaw, Poland
- Coordinates: 52°14′6.5″N 21°3′55.7″E

Międzynarodowa Street is a street located in the Saska Kępa and Kamionek districts of Warsaw, Poland. Its name, like many other streets in Saska Kępa, is linked to pre-war plans to designate nearby areas as exhibition grounds. The street is primarily lined with post-war residential buildings, as well as various commercial and service establishments.

== Route and traffic ==
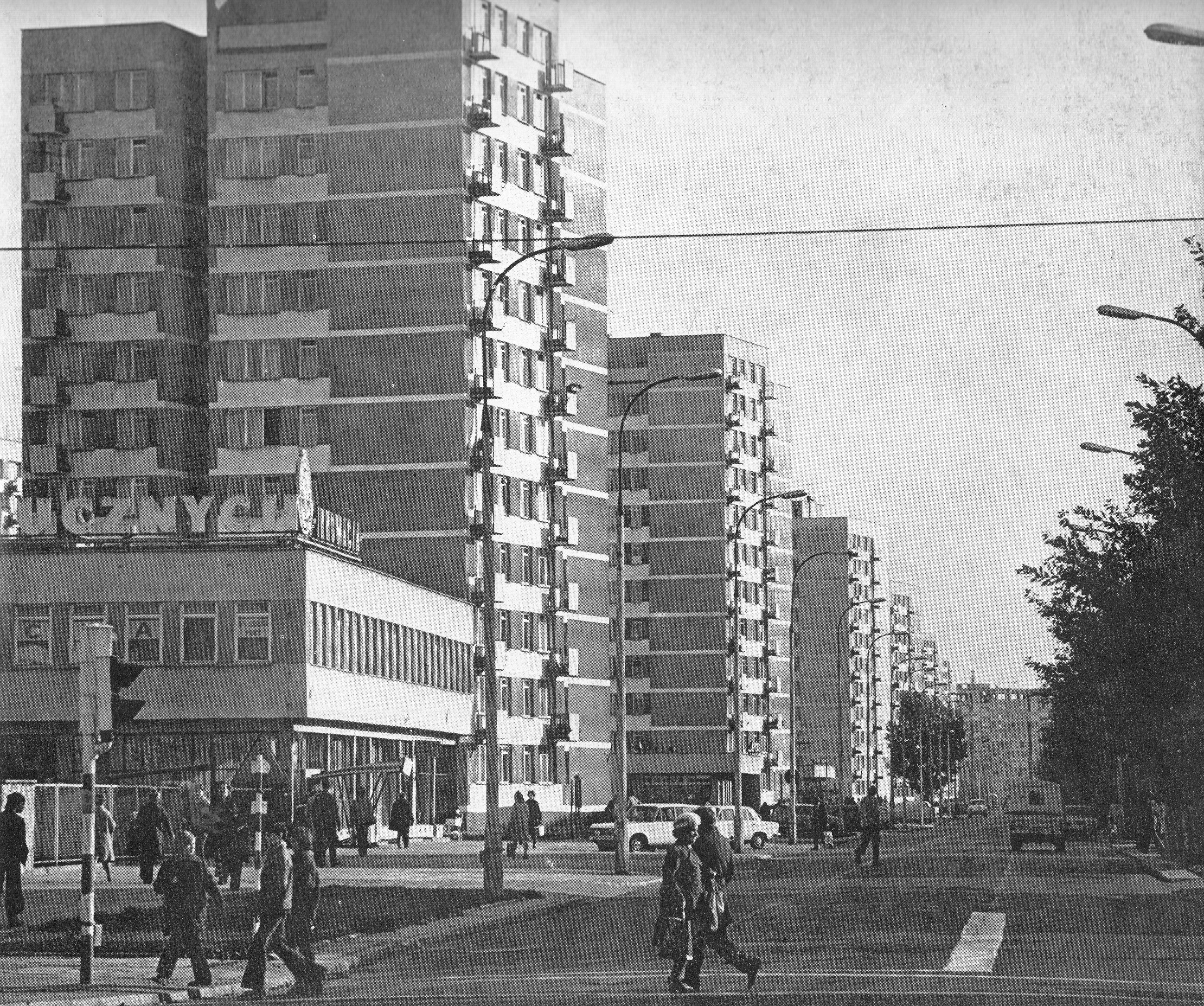
Międzynarodowa Street in 1973

Międzynarodowa Street begins in Saska Kępa at Stanów Zjednoczonych Avenue (Łazienki Route). It intersects with the following streets: Brazylijska Street, Zwycięzców Street, Walecznych Street, and Angorska Street. Beyond George Washington Avenue, it becomes a dead-end section running alongside Skaryszew Park. Only pedestrian traffic is permitted over the bridge crossing the Exhibition Canal. The further, non-addressed section (extending to Grochowska Street) allows vehicular traffic. The street is two-way and single-carriageway in all sections open to vehicles. Additionally, in Saska Kępa (between Washington Avenue and Zwycięzców Street), a bike path runs behind the residential blocks on the eastern side of the street. A Veturilo bike-sharing station is located at the intersection with Walecznych Street.

Public transport routes run along Międzynarodowa Street, with bus stops for lines 111 and 123.

== History ==
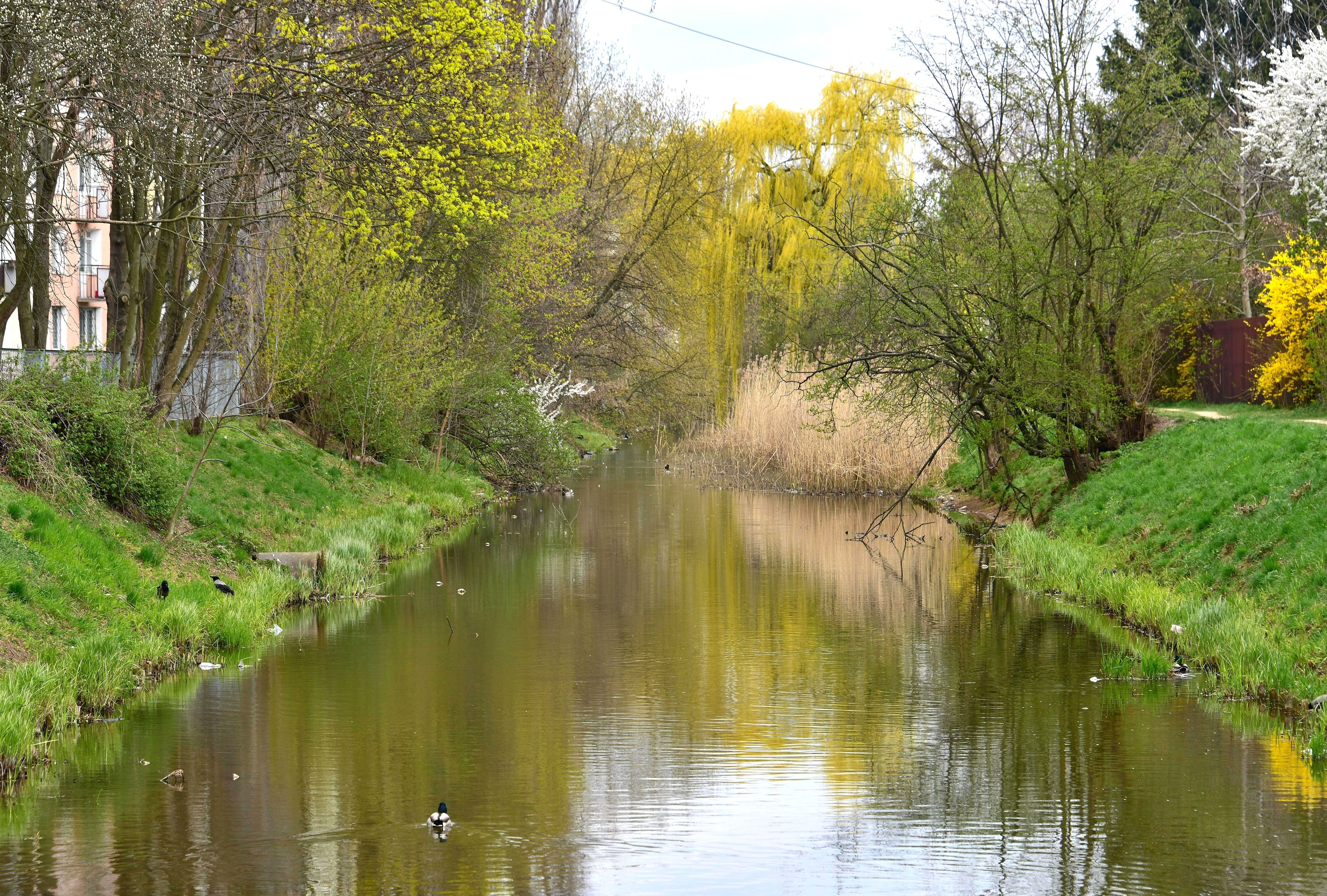
Exhibition Canal near Międzynarodowa Street

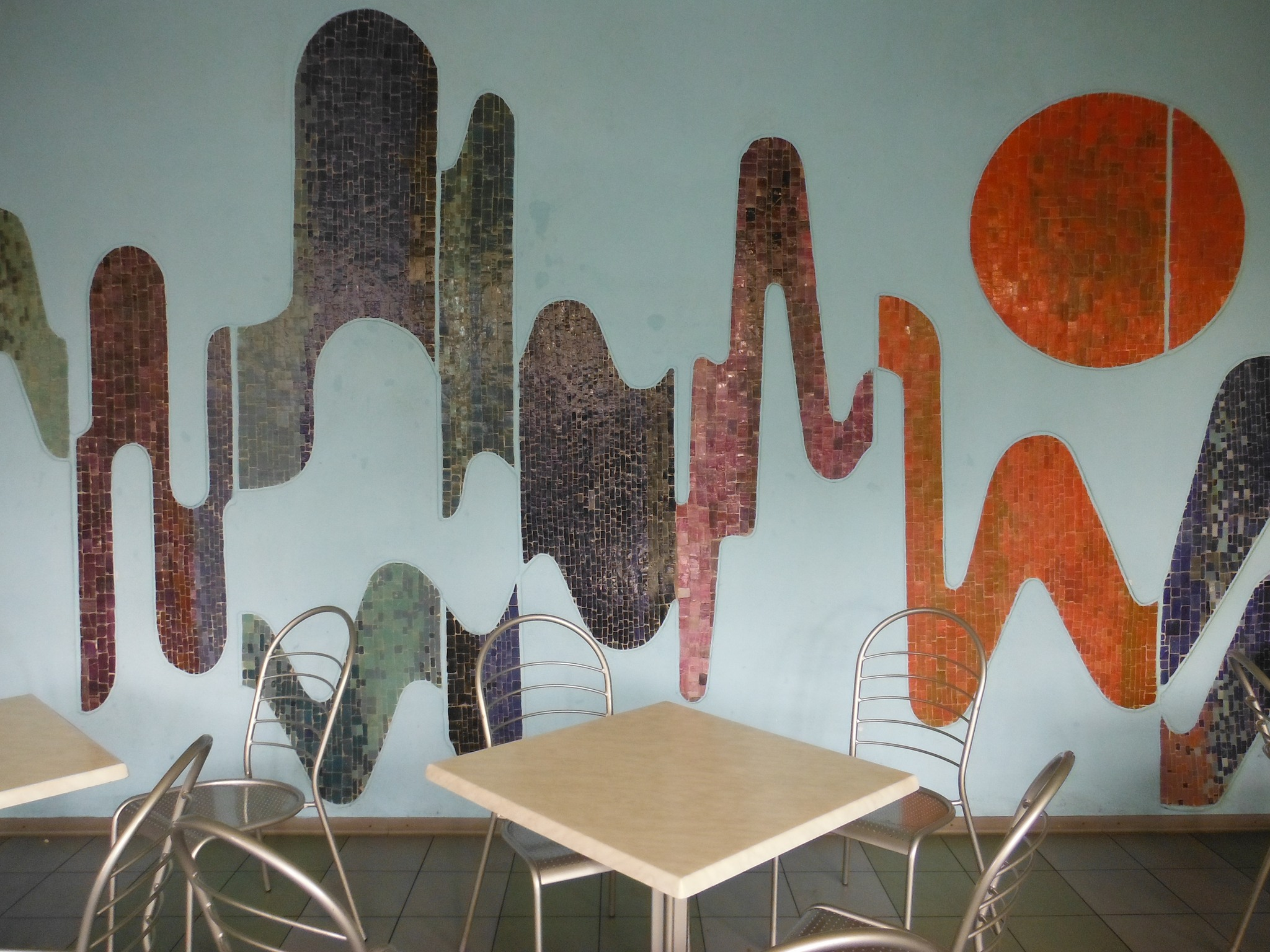
Mosaic in the Alpejski Bar

In the past, the area east of Międzynarodowa Street was part of the former Vistula riverbed. Before World War I, plans were considered to build municipal slaughterhouses in the area. During the interwar period, the areas around present-day Międzynarodowa Street were designated for exhibition grounds. Surviving plans indicate that near the current intersection with Washington Avenue, a Representative Stadium and Agricultural Exhibition Pavilions were proposed. The street's name and the nearby Exhibition Canal are remnants of these plans.

After World War II, the boundaries of Saska Kępa were effectively extended to include Międzynarodowa Street. The current post-war development, primarily constructed during the Polish People's Republic, includes residential estates such as Saska Kępa I (built in 1960 between Angorska, Międzynarodowa, Saska, and Zwycięzców streets, designed by Arnold Majorek), Saska Kępa II (located between Międzynarodowa, Zwycięzców, and Paryska streets, and Łazienki Route), and Międzynarodowa Estate. Some buildings were constructed after 1989, such as an apartment building at the intersection of Zwycięzców and Międzynarodowa streets, designed by Jacek Zielonka in 2000.

One feature of Międzynarodowa Street is a group of outdoor sculptures created in the 1970s as part of a broader urban space humanization program implemented on the so-called "Young Estates". These include works by artists such as Teresa Brzóskiewicz and Ryszard Wojciechowski. The street's cultural and historical value is highlighted by guided tours organized by the Museum of Warsaw.

== Notable landmarks ==
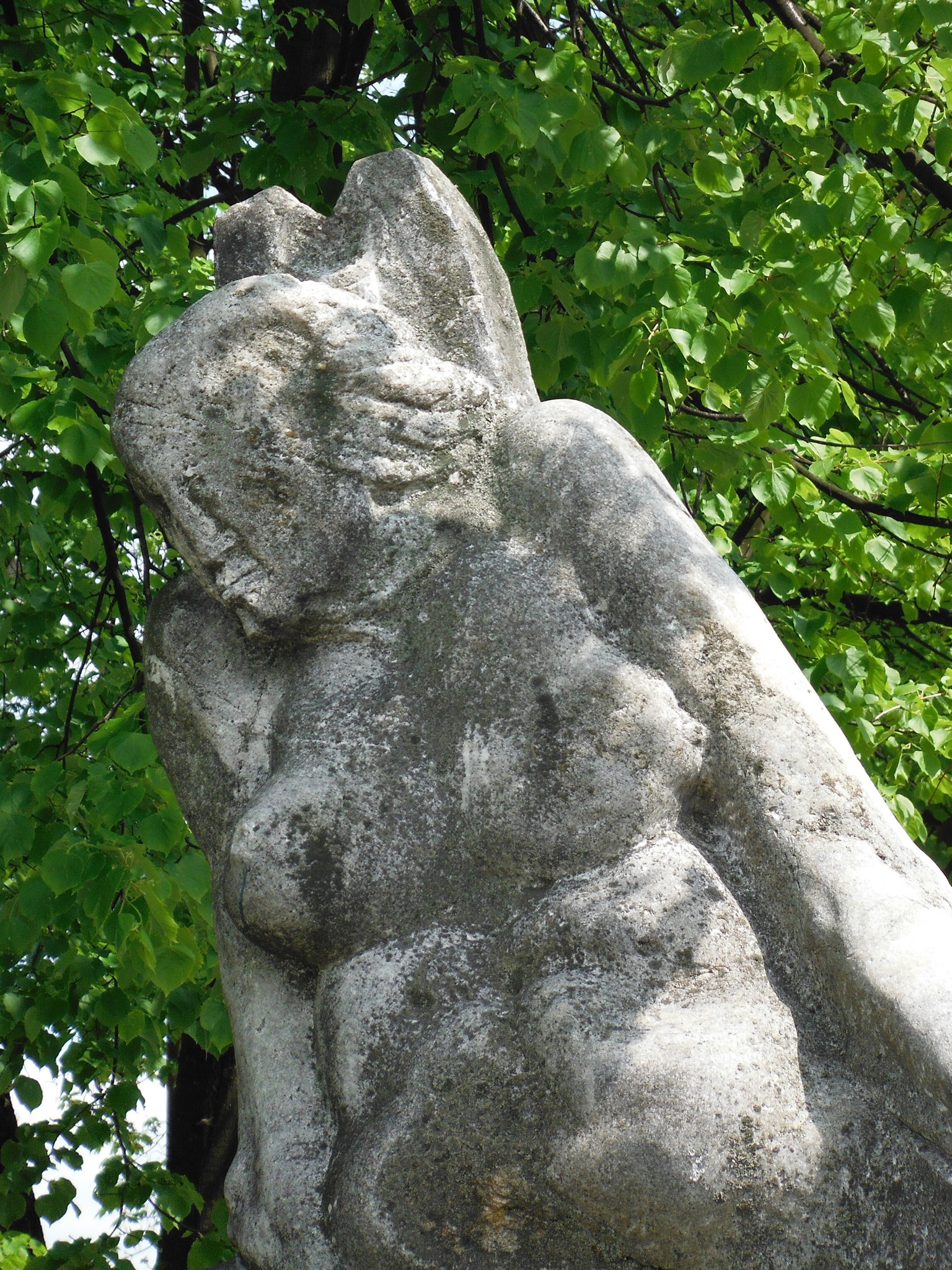
Sculpture Majestat Wszechżycia (Majesty of All Life)

- Exhibition Canal and the Mandragora Family Allotment Gardens.
- Outdoor sculptures, including Wiosna (Spring) by Teresa Brzóskiewicz (near Washington Avenue) and Majestat Wszechżycia (Majesty of All Life) by Ryszard Wojciechowski (at the intersection with Zwycięzców Street).
- Czesław Niemen Primary School No. 168 (44 Zwycięzców Street).
- Building at 74 Walecznych Street (corner with Międzynarodowa Street) – OSP Saska Kępa café, hosting the weekly Fresh Sunday food market during the summer season.
- Building at 65 Międzynarodowa Street – Fregata Restaurant.
- Building at 68 Międzynarodowa Street – Alpejski Bar, featuring preserved decorative mosaics and metalwork.
- Memorial to the workers of the Telephone Equipment Manufacturing Plants near Lake Kamionek.

== Bibliography ==
- Faryna-Paszkiewicz, Hanna (2001). Saska Kępa (in Polish). Warsaw: Murator. ISBN 83-915407-0-7.
- Media related to Międzynarodowa Street in Warsaw at Wikimedia Commons
