= Bust of Bolesław Prus =

Sculpture in Warsaw, Poland

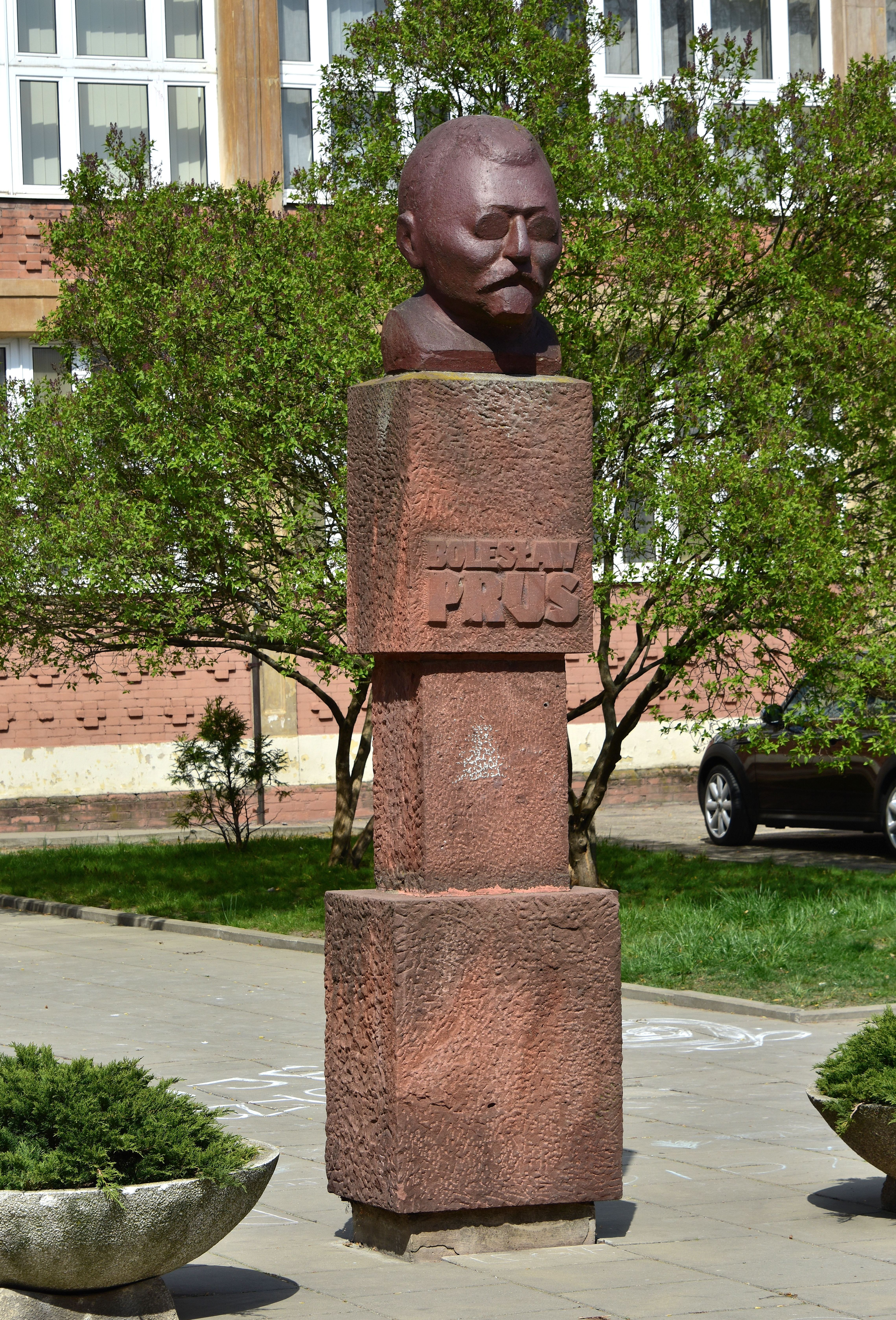
- The sculpture in 2019.
- Interactive map of Bust of Bolesław Prus
- Location: 7 and 9 Zwycięzców Street, Praga-South, Warsaw, Poland
- Coordinates: 52°13′51.7″N 21°03′09.6″E
- Designer: Stanisław Sikora
- Type: Bust
- Material: Stone
- Height: c. 3 m
- Opening date: 19 May 1983
- Dedicated to: Bolesław Prus

The bust of Bolesław Prus (Polish pronunciation: [bɔˈlεs.waf ˈprus]; Polish: Popiersie Bolesława Prusa) is a monument in the city of Warsaw, Poland, placed in front of the Bolesław Prus 35th General Education High School at 7 and 9 Zwycięzców Street, in the neighbourhood of Saska Kępa, within the district of Praga-South. It consists of a stone bust depicting Bolesław Prus, a 19th- and 20th century novelist, and a leading figure in the history of Polish literature and philosophy, placed on a sandstone pedestal. The sculpture was made by Stanisław Sikora, and unveiled on 19 May 1983.

== History ==
The monument was proposed by the Friends of Warsaw Society, and dedicated to Bolesław Prus, a 19th- and 20th century novelist, and a leading figure in the history of Polish literature and philosophy. Its location within the neighbourhood of Saska Kępa was chosen as Prus was involved in the cultural life of the area, including volunteering in organising numerous festivals, as well as wrote articles reporting on the investments in the area. The sculpture was made by Stanisław Sikora, and unveiled on 19 May 1983, on the 71st anniversary of Prus's death.

== Design ==
The monument consists of a dark brown stone bust depicting Bolesław Prus, placed on a red sandstone pedestal. It is around 3-metres-tall. The sculpture is placed in front of the Bolesław Prus 35th General Education Highschool at 7 and 9 Zwycięzców Street.
