= Alfred Nobel Street =

Street in Warsaw, Poland

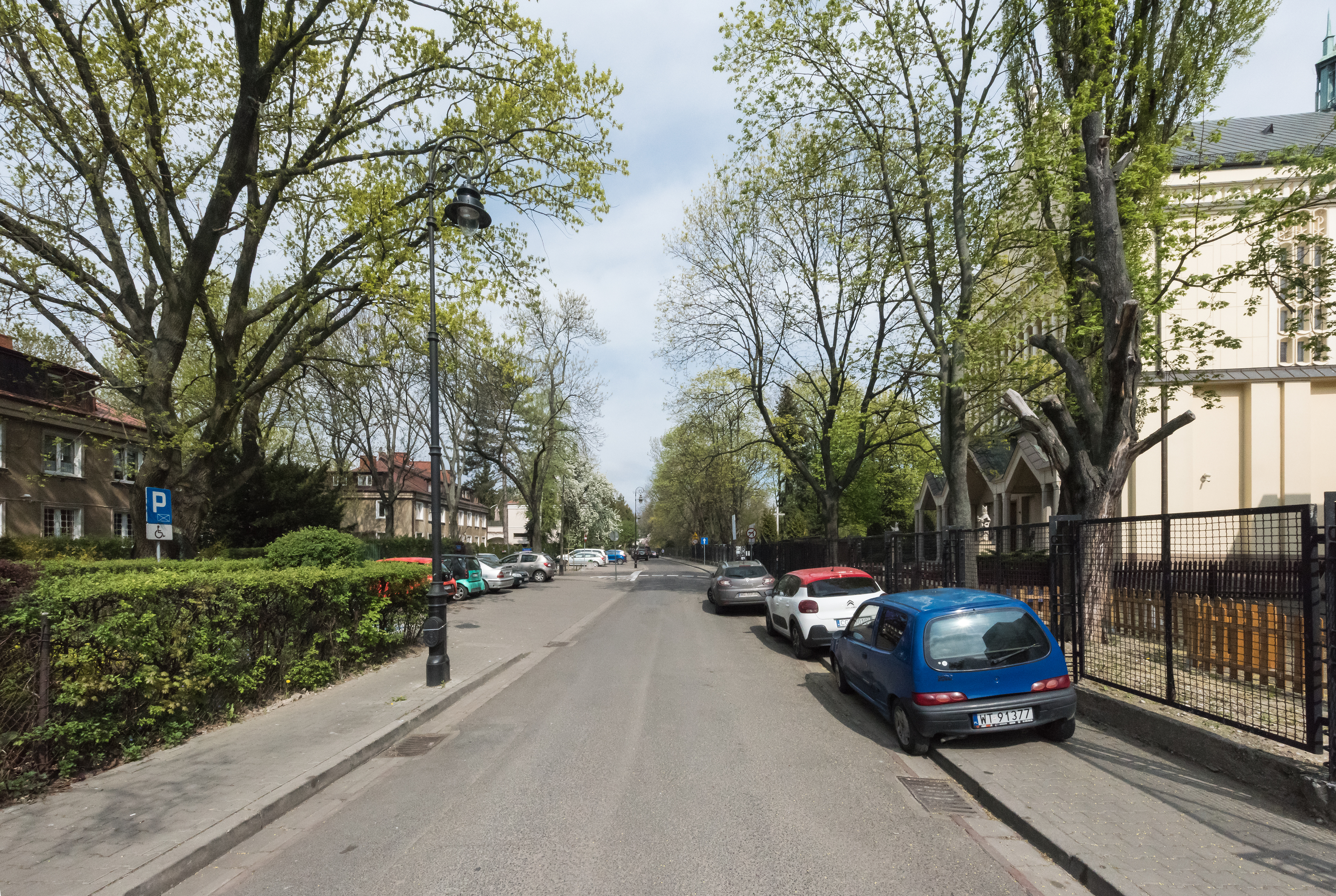
- Alfred Nobel Street, with the Church of St. Andrew Bobola on the right
- Interactive map of Alfred Nobel Street
- Native name: Ulica Alfreda Nobla (Polish)
- Part of: Saska Kępa
- Location: Warsaw, Poland
- Coordinates: 52.2337400°N 21.0587246°E

Alfred Nobel Street is a street in the Saska Kępa district of Praga-Południe, Warsaw. It runs from the intersection with Zwycięzców Street and ends as a dead-end beyond Walecznych Street. The street is primarily lined with residential houses, several public buildings, and the historic Church of St. Andrew Bobola. Its name commemorates the Swedish inventor Alfred Nobel, distinguishing it from nearby streets named after the geopolitical landscape following World War I.

== History ==
The street was named by a resolution of the Warsaw City Council on 27 September 1926.

The oldest surviving houses on Alfred Nobel Street date from the 1930s. Before World War II, construction began on the masonry Church of St. Andrew Bobola near a wooden church of the same name, relocated from Żoliborz, which burned down in September 1939. In 1938, the Parish of Our Lady of Perpetual Help was established, though the church retained its original dedication. During the siege of Warsaw, the street was a site of combat. A heavy machine gun and two infantry helmets, hidden by soldiers and discovered in 1987, were donated to the Polish Army Museum in Warsaw.

Over time, Alfred Nobel Street became a hub for artists in Saska Kępa. After World War II, it was home to ceramists (e.g., Zofia Palowa, Wanda Gosławska), interior architect Kazimierz Kamler, and glass artist Władysław Zych. Sculptors from the Kolektyw cooperative formed the largest group. Some of their homes and studios served as film sets, including Józef Trenarowski's house for scenes in Jezioro osobliwości by Jan Batory and Adam Roman's studio for shots in Man of Marble by Andrzej Wajda.

The street's architectural and historical value is highlighted by private companies and NGOs through guided tours and open-house events.

Buildings at Alfred Nobel Street
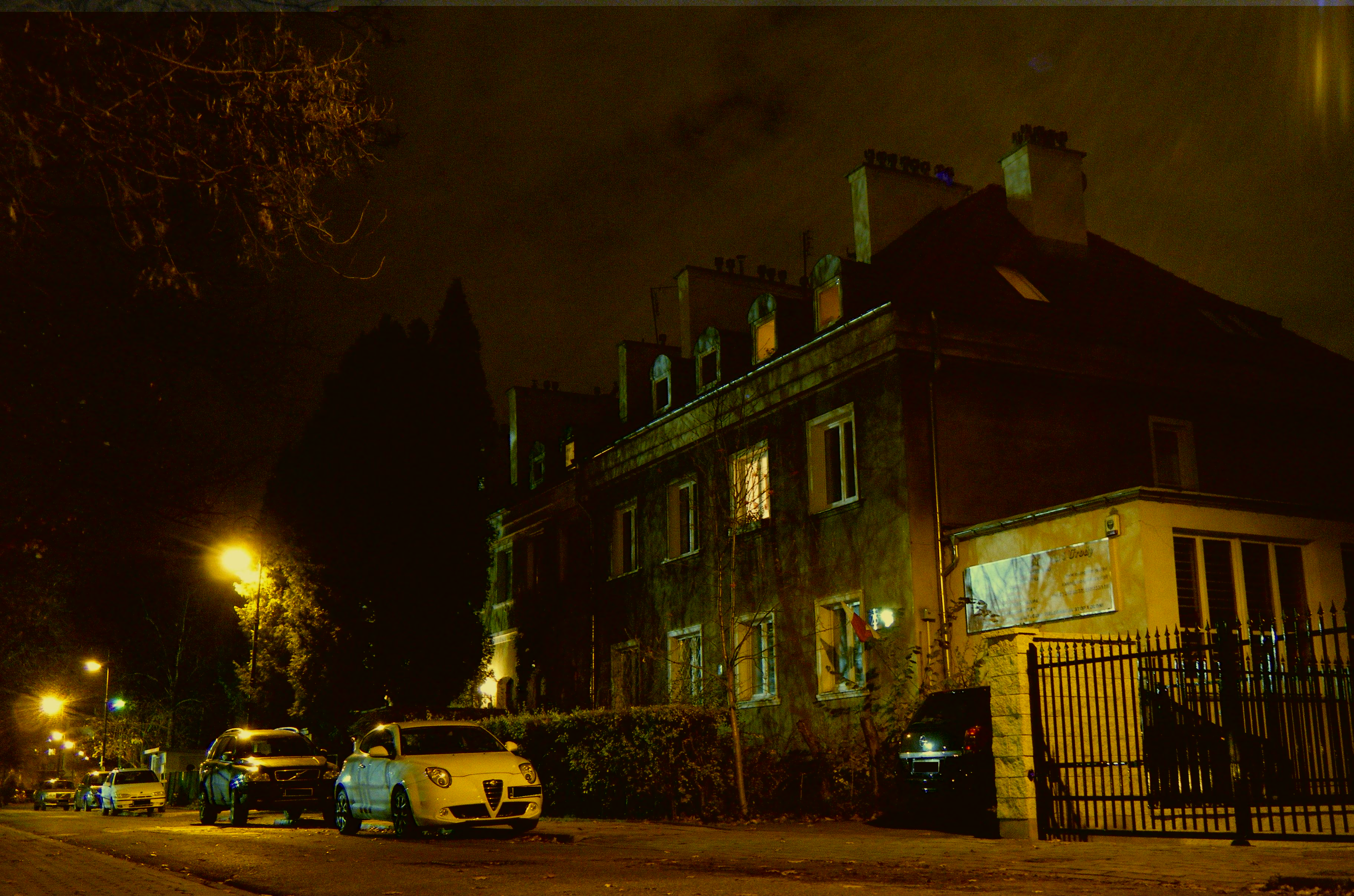
23/25 Alfred Nobel Street

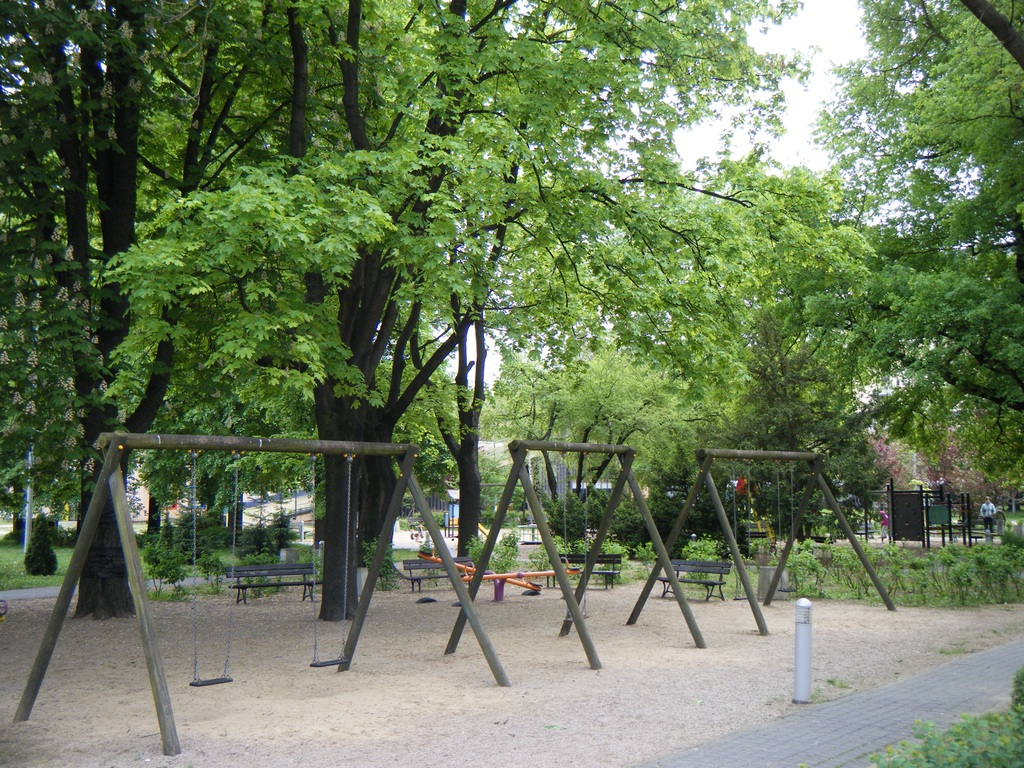
Extracurricular Activity Center No. 2

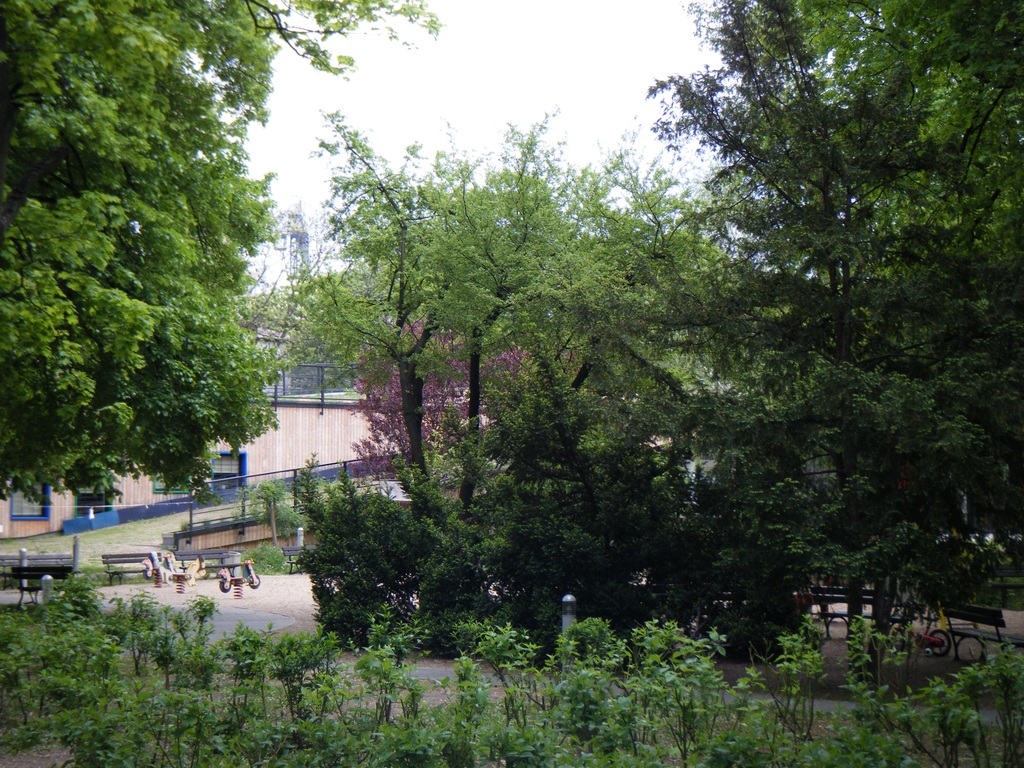
Extracurricular Activity Center No. 2

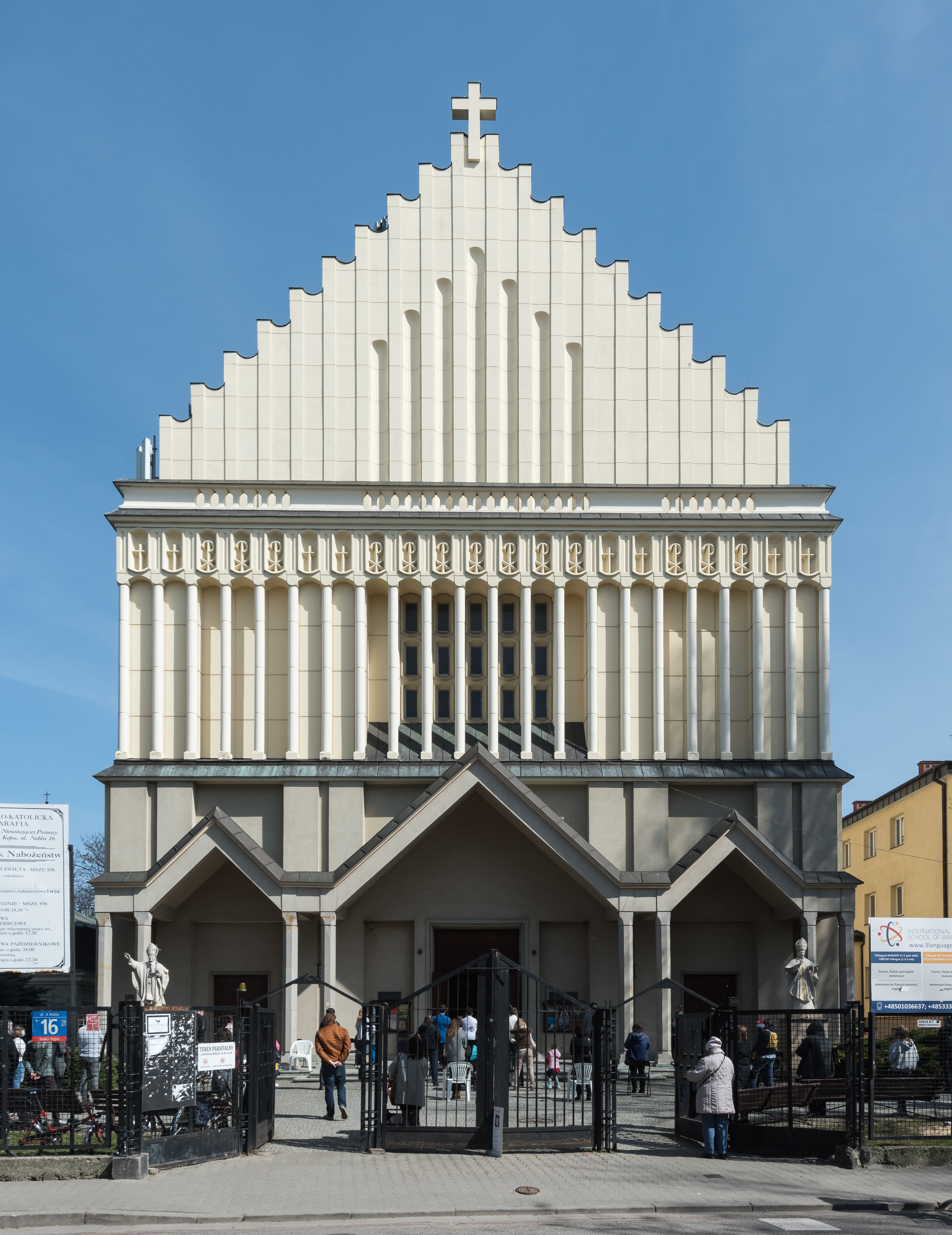
Church of St. Andrew Bobola

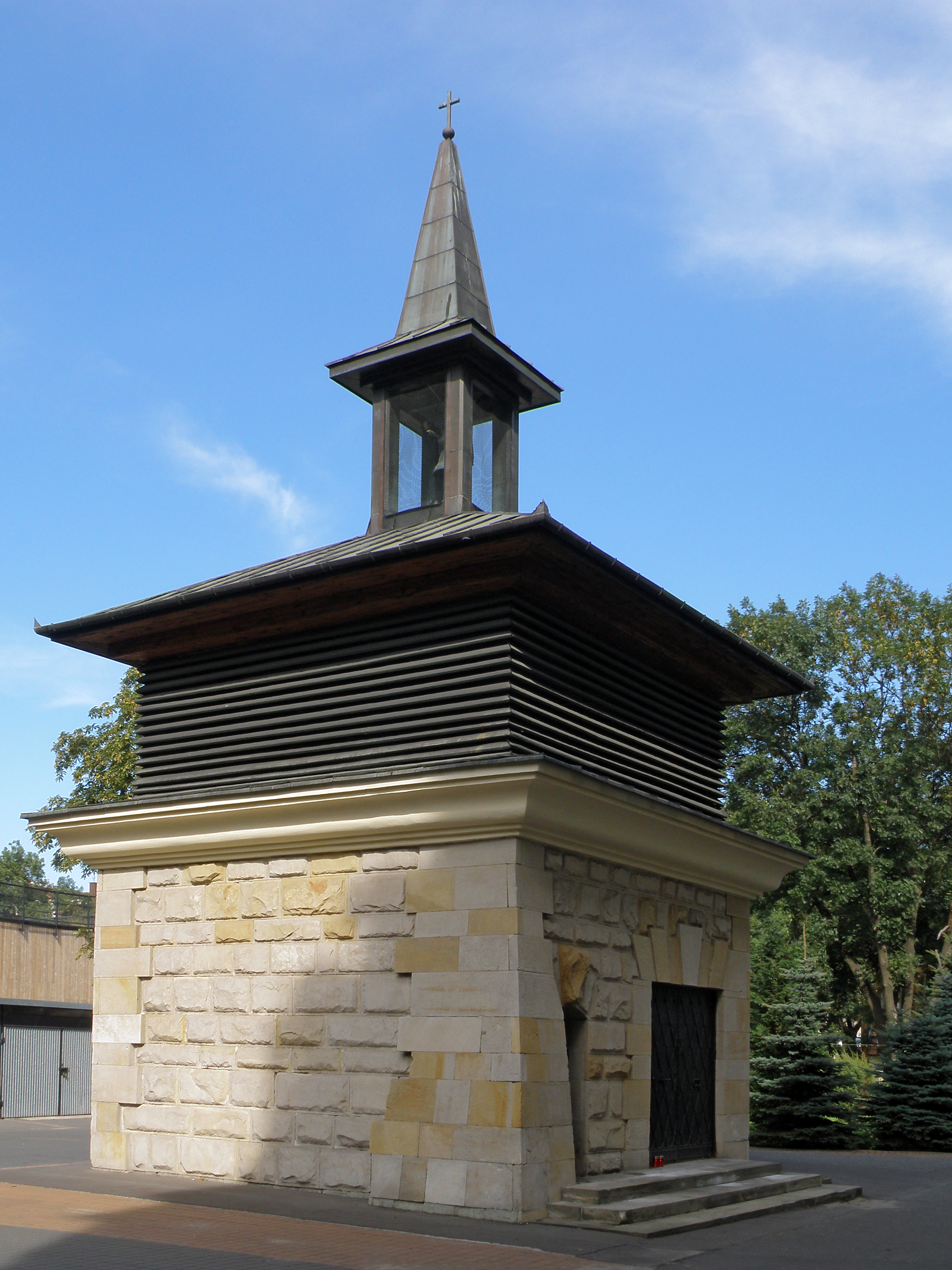
Church bell tower

== Notable buildings ==
- Building at 2 Alfred Nobel Street, designed by Andrzej Gałkowski, has been the Regional Blood Donation and Blood Treatment Center since 1964.
- House at 7 Alfred Nobel Street, residence of Wacław Graba-Łęcki.
- Church of St. Andrew Bobola (Parish of Our Lady of Perpetual Help) at 16 Alfred Nobel Street, initially designed by Piotr Lubiński and Henryk Wąsowicz between 1938 and 1939, was completed by Józef Łowiński and Jan Bogusławski between 1948 and 1949. The facade and interior reflect Gothic architecture. The interior features wall paintings by Maria and Jerzy Ostrowski and sculptures by Tadeusz Świerczek. The building is listed in the register of cultural heritage.
- House at 17 Alfred Nobel Street, a 1937 villa designed by Maksymilian Goldberg for H. Klein.
- Oak at 36/38 Obrońców Street, a pedunculate oak designated a natural monument in 2019.
- Extracurricular Activity Center No. 2 at 18/26 Alfred Nobel Street, formerly the Jordan Park, has a new building since 2010, including an IT room and gym. The building's design allows its roof to be used for sledding in winter. Since 2012, the garden has hosted the successor to the Royal Oak (Saska Oak), originally located at 4 Francuska Street before the war.
- Houses at 23–25 Alfred Nobel Street, built by the Kolektyw cooperative, designed by Stefan Koziński, housed studios and residences for sculptors and their families, including Józef Trenarowski, Adam Roman, Józef Gosławski, Kazimierz Bieńkowski, Eugeniusz Żarkowski, Tadeusz Świerczek, and Adam Procki.
- Houses at 27–29 Alfred Nobel Street, two four-family terraced houses built after 1937, designed by Maksymilian Goldberg.

== Bibliography ==
- Faryna-Paszkiewicz, Hanna (2001). Saska Kępa (in Polish). Warsaw: Murator. ISBN 83-915407-0-7.
