= Saska Kępa =

Saska Kępa Saxon Meadow
- Warsaw neighbourhood
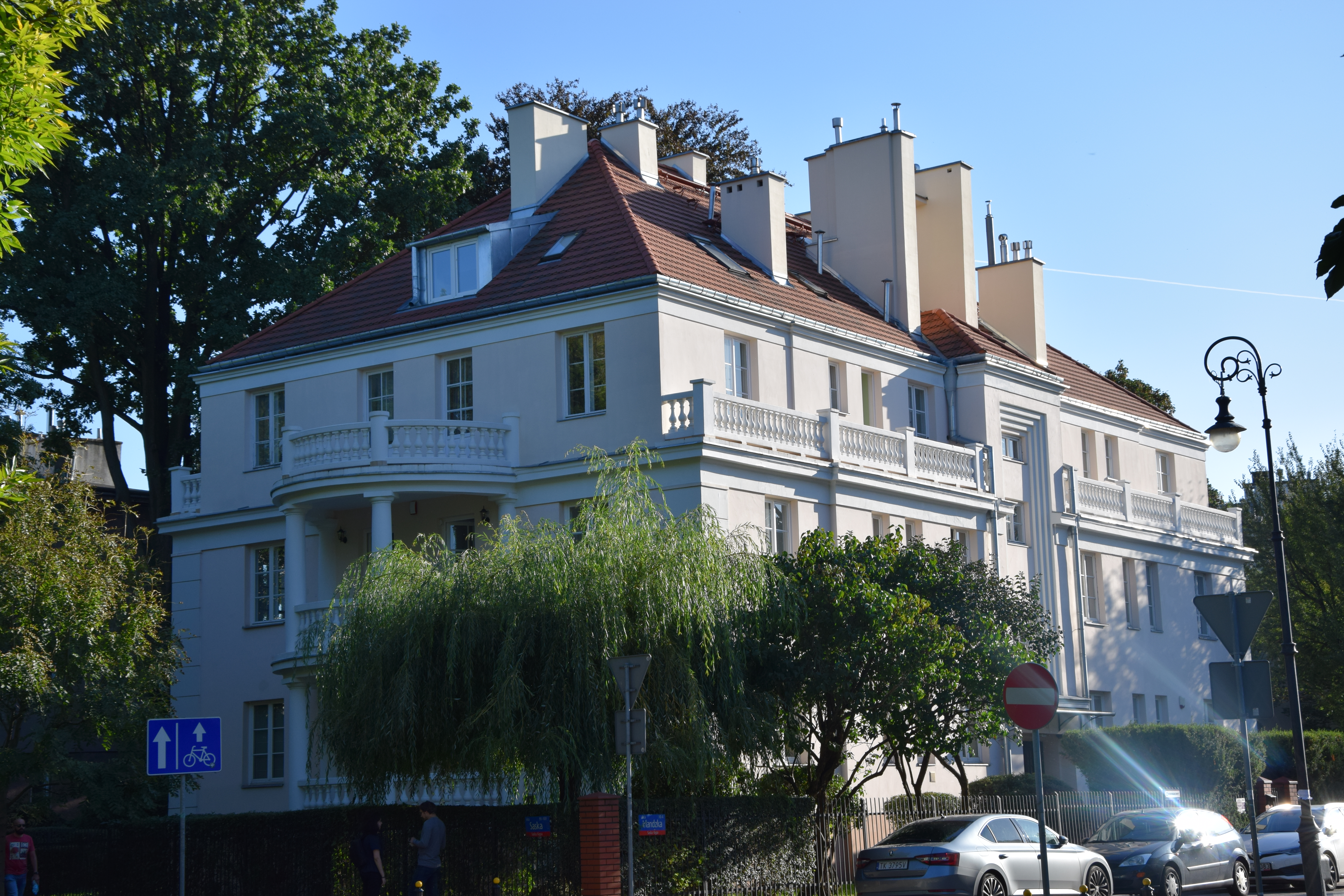
- One of the many villas in Saska Kępa

- Location of Saska Kępa (red) in the District of Praga Południe (navy blue)
- Coordinates: 52.2327°N 21.0596°E
- Country: Poland
- Voivodeship: Masovian
- City: Warsaw
- Time zone: +2

Saska Kępa (Polish pronunciation: [ˈsaska ˈkɛmpa], Saxon Meadow) is a neighbourhood in Warsaw, Poland, part of the Praga Południe (South Praga) district, with a population of over 40.000 inhabitants. It is also the home to one of Warsaw's largest urban parks, the Skaryszew Park. The neighbourhood is mostly occupied by semi-detached suburban houses and villas.

== History ==
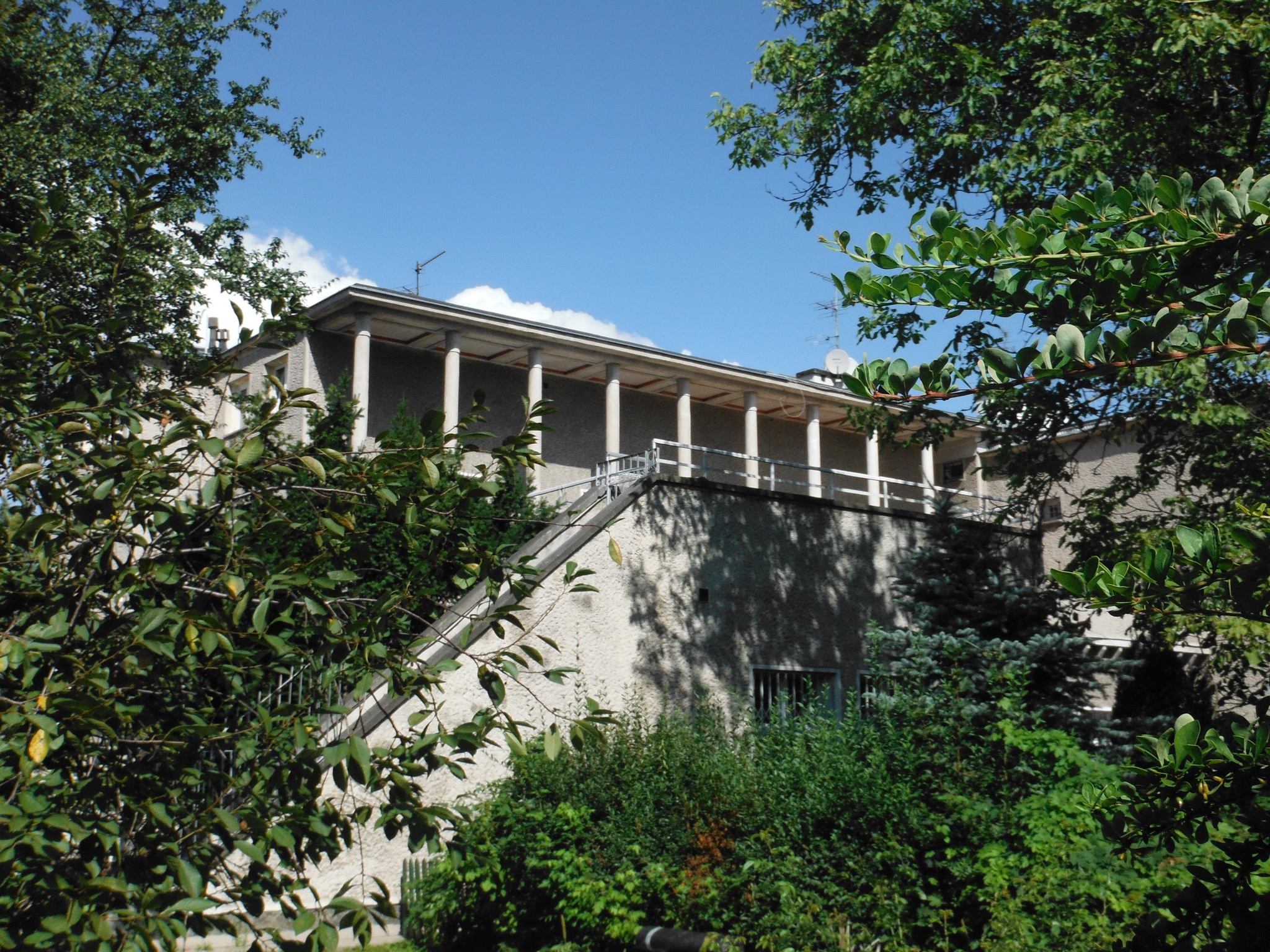
House of Zalewski's family - an example of prewar house designed by Bohdan Pniewski

In the seventeenth century, an area of the (eastern) bank of the Vistula River opposite Warsaw was turned into a military camp. This area became known as Saska Kępa ('Saxon meadow') after the Saxon Guards of the Kings of Poland stationed there in the eighteenth century. The area retained its rural character until the early twentieth century. It officially became part of the city of Warsaw in 1916, and quickly became one of the fastest-growing areas of the city. During the 1920s and 1930s members of Warsaw's growing middle class built mansions in the suburb and the area became a popular residential area.

The location of Saska Kępa on the east bank of the Vistula, allowed the district to escape the systematic destruction inflicted during and after the Warsaw Uprising of 1944. The area also largely escaped urban redevelopment by communist authorities after World War II, despite several plans to industrialise it. This allowed the suburb, now a district of Praga Południe to retain much of its original peaceful character. It has historically housed many foreign embassies and consulates, nestled among streets that were named in the 1920s after continents, nations, and major world cities.

Francuska Street is today the main commercial street, and is lined with shops and increasingly large numbers of restaurants.

The "front door" to the district is Rondo Waszyngtona, a roundabout named after George Washington, which links the suburb via the Poniatowski Bridge to the Warsaw city centre by road and tram. The north side of the roundabout hosts the Polish National Stadium, formerly the 10th Anniversary Stadium.

Several controversial apartment complexes have sprung up within Saska Kępa, but no further major construction projects are being considered for fear they would damage the unique character of the area. Many of the older homes in Saska Kępa were remodelled in the late 1990s and early 2000s, but most were restored in a manner consistent with the pre-World War II character of the district.

== Notable residents ==
- Tadeusz Baird - composer
- Wiktor Banach - Entrepreneur and Philanthropist
- Miron Białoszewski - poet, novelist, playwright and actor
- Stanisław Bułak-Bałachowicz - Polish-Belarusian general, veteran of World War I, the Russian Civil War, the Polish-Bolshevik War and Polish Defensive War
- Jan Cybis - painter
- Katarzyna Figura - actress
- Józef Gosławski - sculptor and medallic artist
- Helena Gruszecka - actress (stage, radio and film)
- Konrad Guderski - organiser and commander of the defense of the Polish Post Office in Danzig
- Tadeusz Kutrzeba - general of the Second Polish Republic
- Witold Lutosławski - composer
- Waldemar Łysiak - author, art historian and journalist
- Agnieszka Osiecka - poet and songwriter
- Jan Parandowski - author, essayist, and translator
- Jan Rokita - liberal-conservative politician, a member of Sejm, the lower chamber of the Polish parliament, and chairman of the parliamentary club of Civic Platform
- Krzysztof Skowroński - journalist and director of Polish Radio's Program 3
- Stanisław Sojka - jazz and pop singer/songwriter
- Stefan Wiechecki ("Wiech") - author

== Bibliography ==
- Piwowar, Magdalena; Piątek, Grzegorz; Trybuś, Jarosław (2012). SAS. An illustrated Atlas of Saska Kępa ARchitecture. Warsaw: Centrum Architektury. ISBN 978-83-934574-0-3.
