= Bust of George Washington (Warsaw) =

Monument in Poland

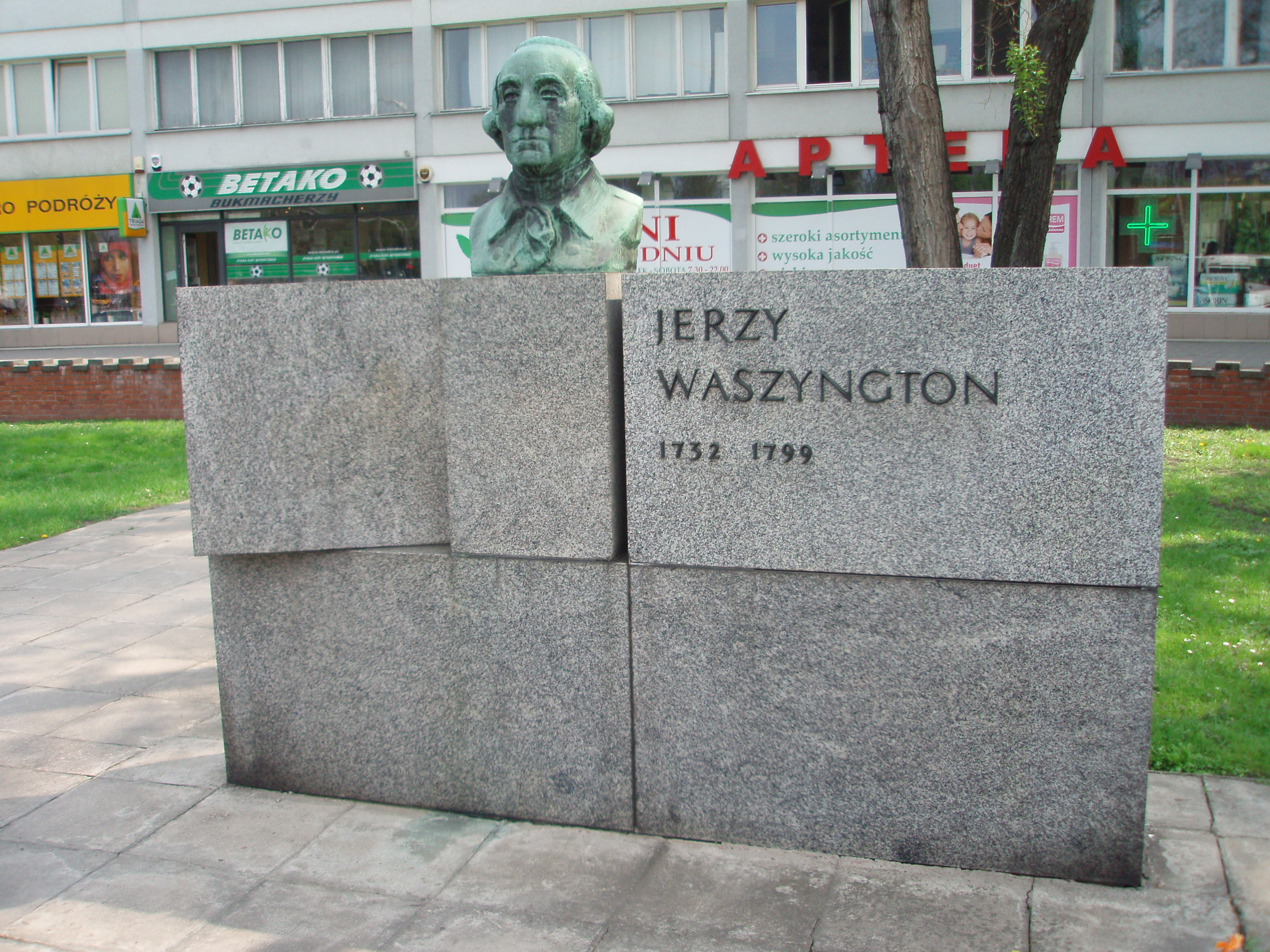
- The monument 2011.
- Interactive map of Bust of George Washington
- Location: George Washington Roundabout, Praga-South, Warsaw, Poland
- Coordinates: 52°14′19.42″N 21°03′07.72″E
- Designer: Bronisław Koniuszy (bust); Bronisław Kubica (pedestal)
- Type: Bust
- Material: Bronze (bust) granite (pedestal)
- Height: c. 2 m (6.6 ft)
- Opening date: 27 October 1989
- Dedicated to: George Washington

The bust of George Washington, (Note: Polish: Popiersie Jerzego Waszyngtona, Popiersie George’a Washingtona) also known as the George Washington Memorial, (Note: Polish: Pomnik Jerzego Waszyngtona, Pomnik George’a Washingtona) is a monument in the city of Warsaw, Poland, placed at the George Washington Roundabout, within the neighbourhood of Saska Kępa in the Praga-South district. It is dedicated to George Washington (1732–1799), the first president of the United States, serving from 1789 to 1797. The monument consist of a bronze bust of Washington, placed on a granite pedestal. The bust and pedestal were designed by Bronisław Koniuszy and Bronisław Kubica, respectively. The monument was on 27 October 1989.

== History ==
The monument was proposed by the division of the Friends of Warsaw Society based in the neighbourhood of Saska Kępa. The bust was designed by Bronisław Koniuszy and the pedestal was designed by Bronisław Kubica. The monument was unveiled on 27 October 1989 by Edward Moskal, the president of the Polish American Congress. It was placed at the George Washington Roundabout.

== Design ==
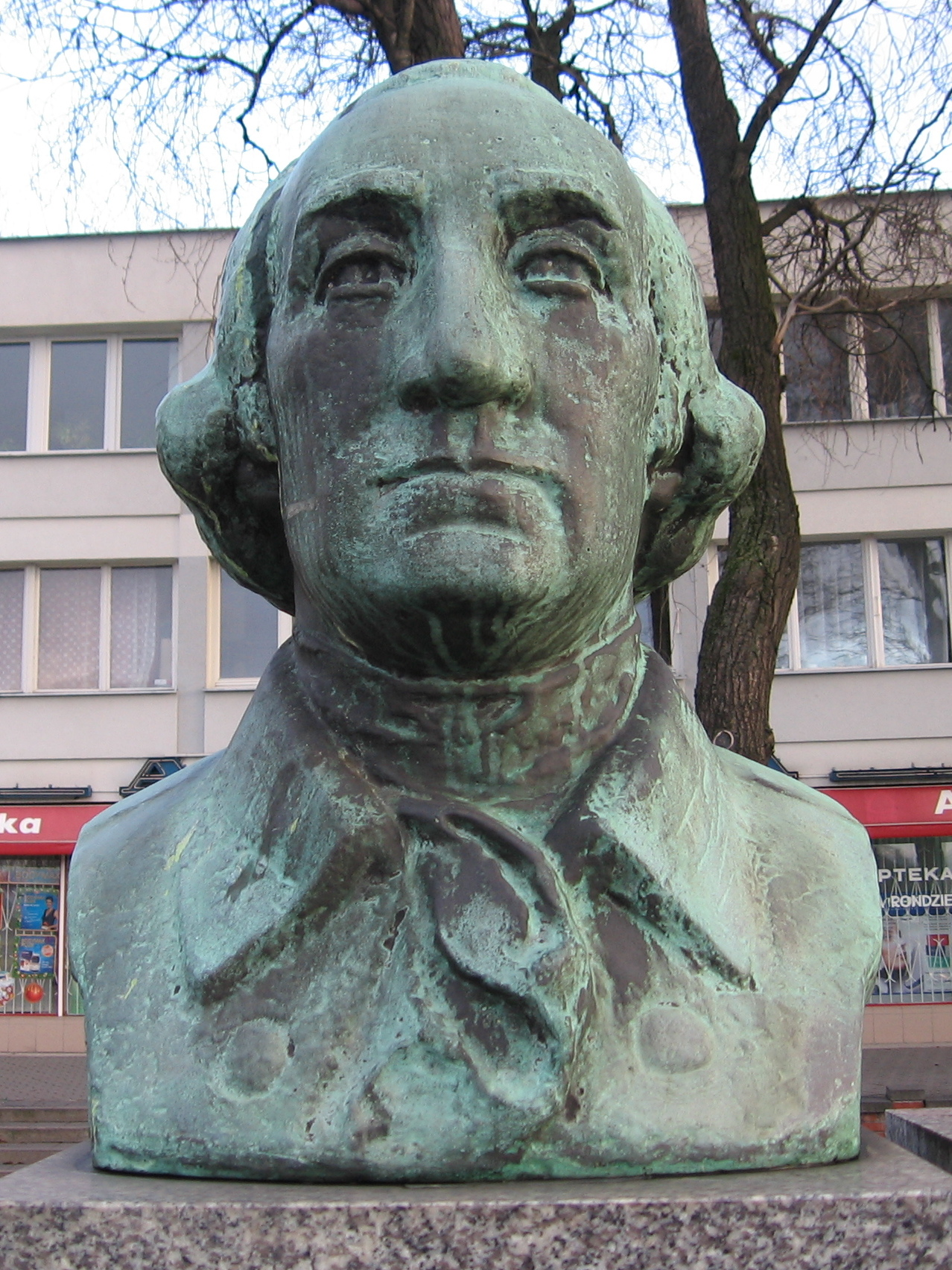
The bust of George Washington.

The monument consists of a bronze bust sculpture placed on top of a granite pedestal. Its total height is about 2 m (6.6 ft). The sculpture depicts George Washington (1732–1799), the first president of the United States, who served from 1789 to 1797. Its design was based on the depiction of Washington on the United States one-dollar bill.

The monument's pedestal has the shape of a rectangular cuboid, divided into four parts. The top left part is further divided into smaller portions, a cube to the left and a rectangular cuboid to the right, on top of which is placed the bust. The cube is tiled vertically at a small angle to the left. The other elements of the socle are identical rectangular cuboids. Its composition was designed to imitate the flag of the United States.i The top right stone of the pedestal bears an inscription which reads "Jerzy Waszyngton" in capital letters, which is Polish traditional rendition George Washington's name. Below i, are inscribed the dates "1732" and "1799", respectively, which are the Washington's dates of birth and death.

== See also ==
- List of statues of George Washington
- List of memorials to George Washington
