= George Washington Roundabout =

Roundabout in Warsaw, Poland

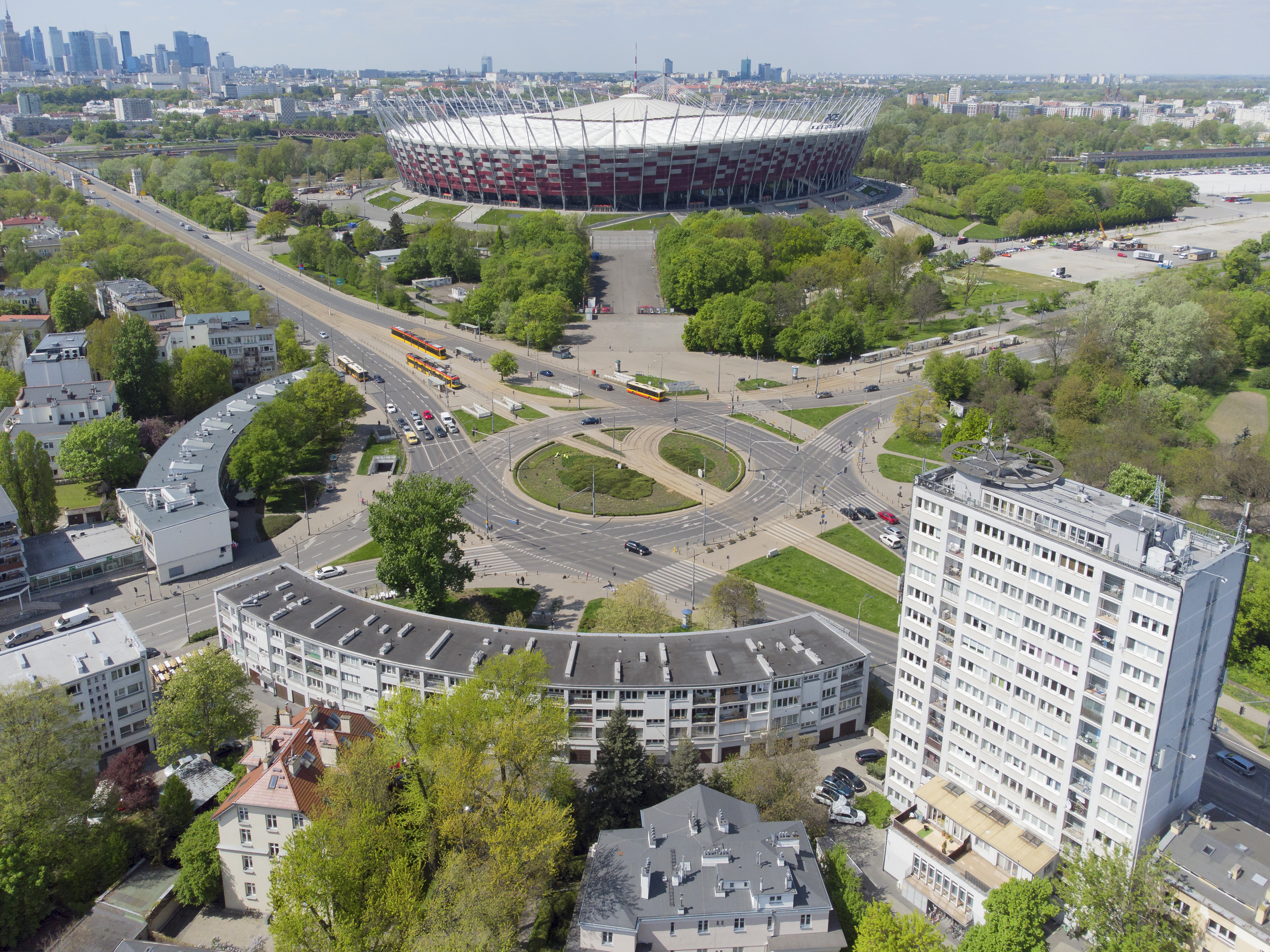
- Aerial view of the roundabout and surroundings from the southeast, with Stadion Narodowy in the background

- Location within Poland
- Part of: Saska Kępa, Kamionek
- Location: Warsaw
- Coordinates: 52°14′17″N 21°3′6″E

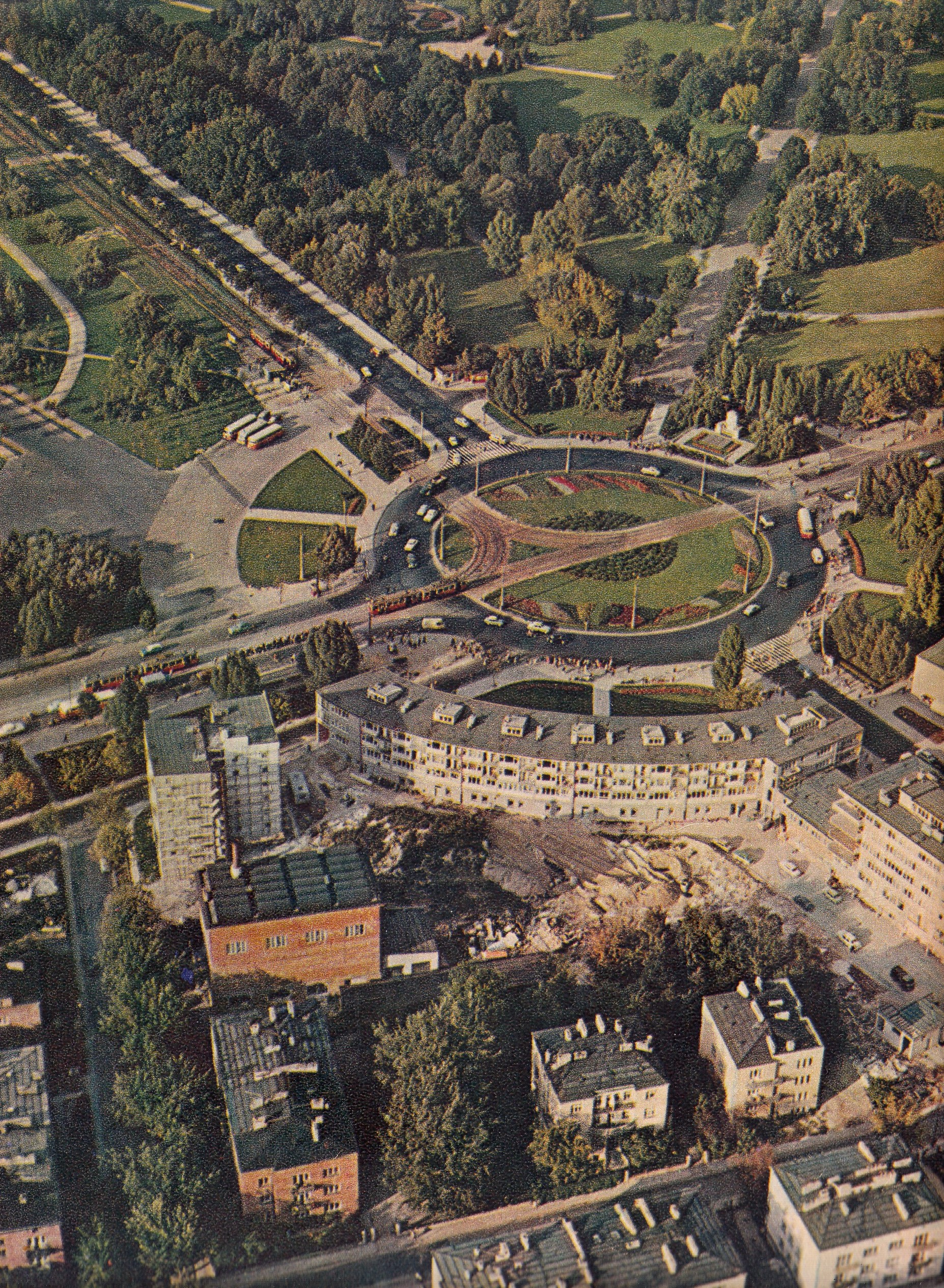
George Washington Roundabout in the 1960s

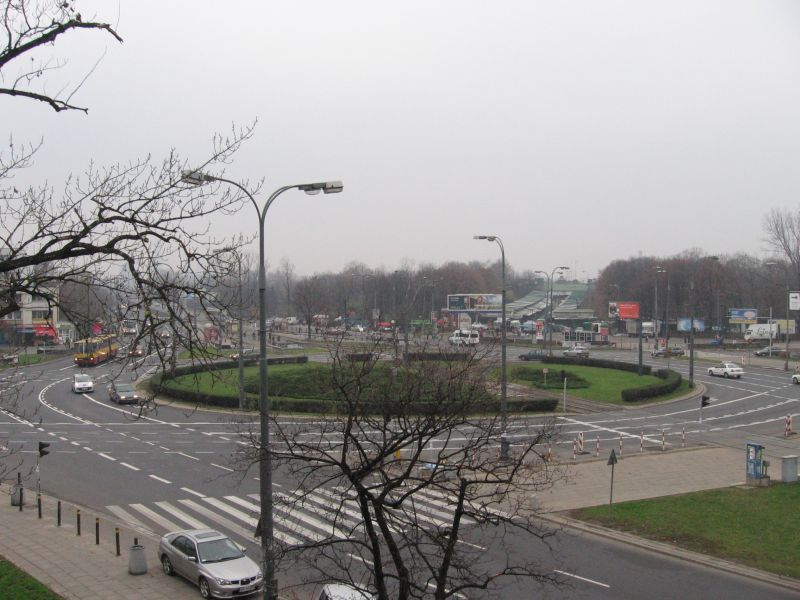
George Washington Roundabout with the Europa Market at the 10th-Anniversary Stadium in the background, November 2006

The George Washington Roundabout (Polish: Rondo Jerzego Waszyngtona) is a roundabout located at the boundary of Saska Kępa and Kamionek in the Praga-Południe district of Warsaw, Poland, along Voivodeship Road 631.

Named in honour of George Washington (1732–1799), the first President of the United States, the name has been in use since at least the early post-World War II years and was officially adopted by a Warsaw City Council resolution on 26 June 2000. The roundabout is surrounded by notable landmarks, including the Stadion Narodowy, Skaryszew Park, and a 1960s urban development.

== History ==
Initially known as Paris Square, the area was later called Poniatowski Square. Around 1926, a plan was proposed to extend Józef Poniatowski Avenue towards Grochów, with a roundabout at its intersection with Zieleniecka Avenue. The design envisioned a star-shaped plaza with five radiating streets: Poniatowski Avenue, Zieleniecka Avenue, George Washington Avenue, Elsterska Street, and Francuska Street. This concept was not fully realised, partly due to frequent changes in the location of exhibition grounds. Pre-war Warsaw maps suggest the roundabout was built with up to six connecting streets, bordered by an outer ring formed by Galijska Street and a surviving alley near the entrance to Skaryszew Park. A pre-war wooden manor house and orchard on the site blocked bus access from the roundabout to Francuska Street into Saska Kępa until the mid-1930s. Between 1937 and 1938, new flowerbeds were planted, and benches were installed on the green spaces near the park entrance.

After World War II, in 1951, a plan was approved to construct an artists' studio complex with monumental and decorative features, including four exhibition halls, storage spaces, a Desa shop, a sculpting workshop, and a milk bar. Designed by Marek Leykam with a distinctive peristyle colonnade, the project aimed to create a socialist realism gateway to the pre-war villa district of Saska Kępa. The plan was ultimately abandoned.

In 1967, modernisation works reduced the central island's size, added funnel-shaped entry lanes, relocated tram stops, installed traffic lights, closed the Jakubowska Street exit, and constructed an underpass beneath Józef Poniatowski Avenue on the western side, opened in 1969. In 1968, the Monument of Gratitude to Soviet Army Soldiers was relocated deeper into Skaryszew Park, and associated graves were moved to the Mausoleum Cemetery of the Soviet Soldiers on Żwirki i Wigury Street.

The most recent addition is Stadion Narodowy, completed in 2011 on the site of the 10th-Anniversary Stadium, which opened in 1955. Built for the UEFA Euro 2012, the stadium prompted upgrades to the roundabout's pavements, road surface, and tram tracks.

== Structures ==
- Stadion Narodowy – constructed between 2008 and 2011 for UEFA Euro 2012, this 70-metre-high stadium (113 metres with its spire) dominates the low-rise surroundings. Its predecessor, the 10th-Anniversary Stadium, hosted the Europa Market for 18 years.
- Skaryszew Park – a historic park established between 1905 and 1916, designed by Franciszek Szanior, featuring sculptures, including pre-war works, and memorials.
- 2B George Washington Avenue High-rise – a 1962–1963 high-rise by Marek Leykam, the first in right-bank Warsaw. Its original fully glazed southern and northern facades were featured in the Wielka Encyklopedia Powszechna PWN under "Polish architecture". Climatic conditions necessitated reducing glazing by half, altering its original design.
- Buildings at 49 Francuska Street and 2A George Washington Avenue – twin buildings from between 1960 and 1965, designed by Tadeusz Bogdan Zieliński, elevated above the pavement, forming a gateway from the roundabout into Saska Kępa. From 1963, the jeweller's shop in one building featured a wall mosaic by Wanda Gosławska, destroyed in the early 1990s. The Cepelia shop's interior was designed by Jan Kurzątkowski. The 49 Francuska Street building, with a distinctive passageway, is owned by the Cultural Workers' Cooperative, while the 2A George Washington Avenue building belongs to the Wspólny Dach Cooperative.
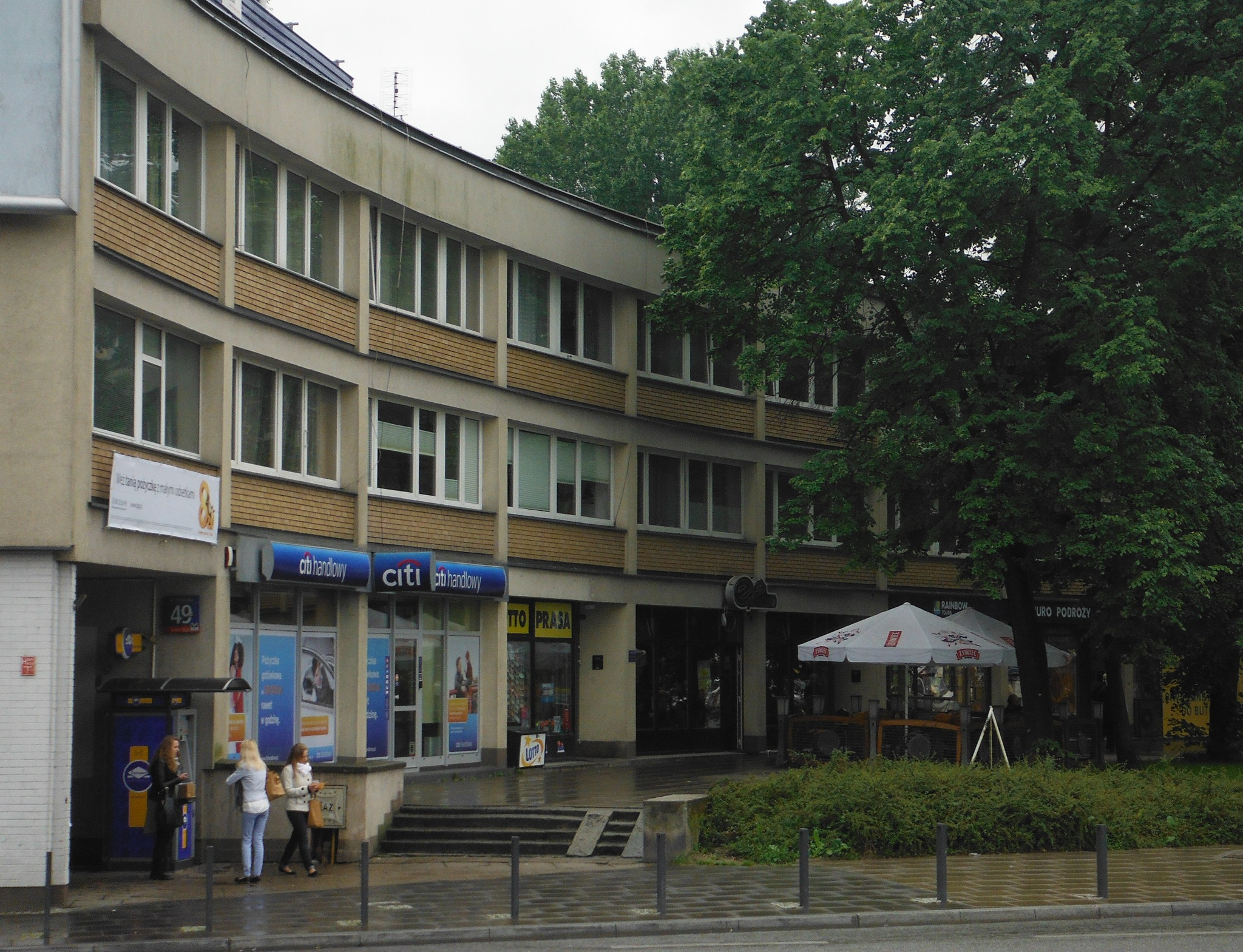
Residential building on the western side

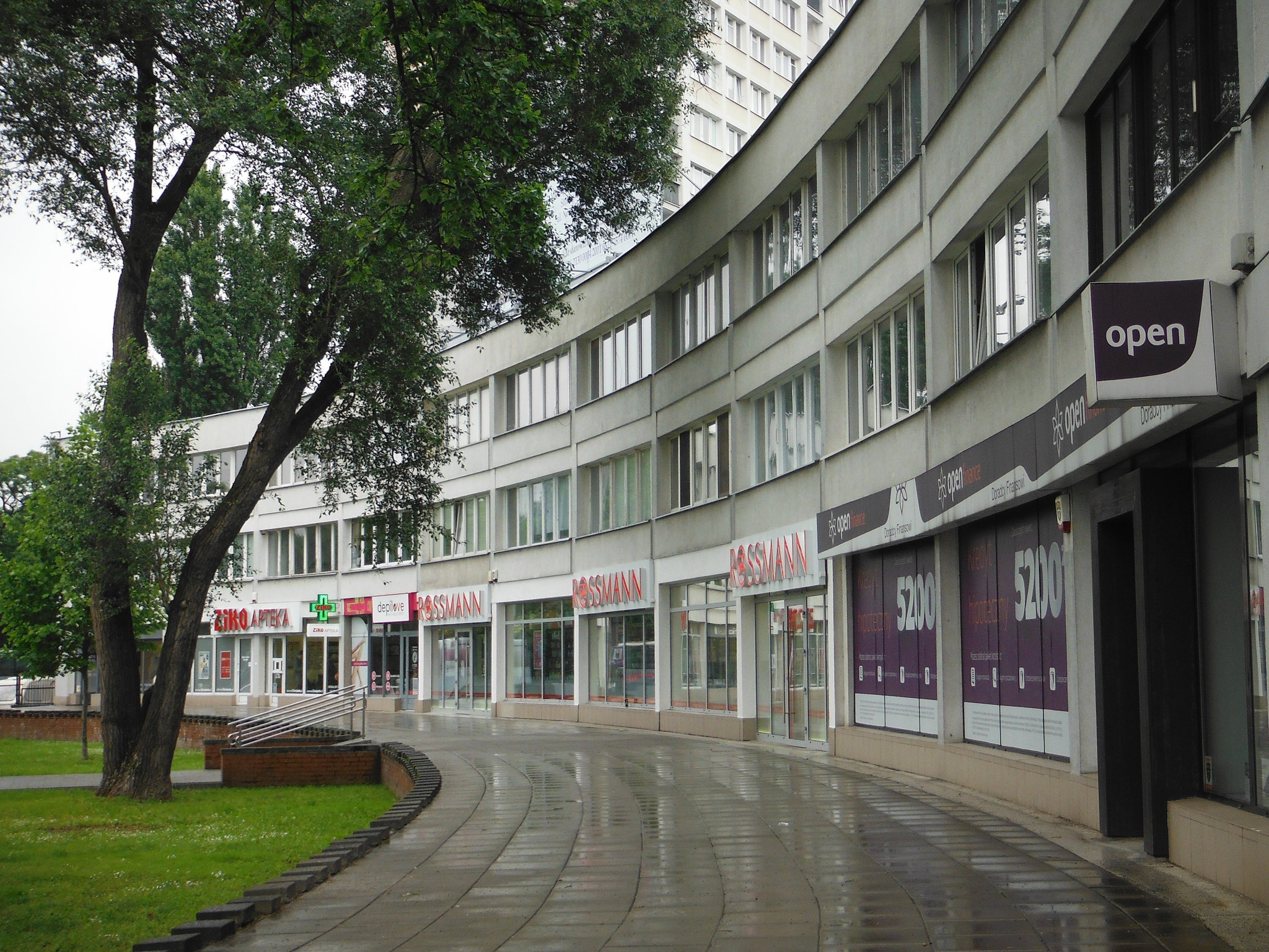
Residential building on the eastern side

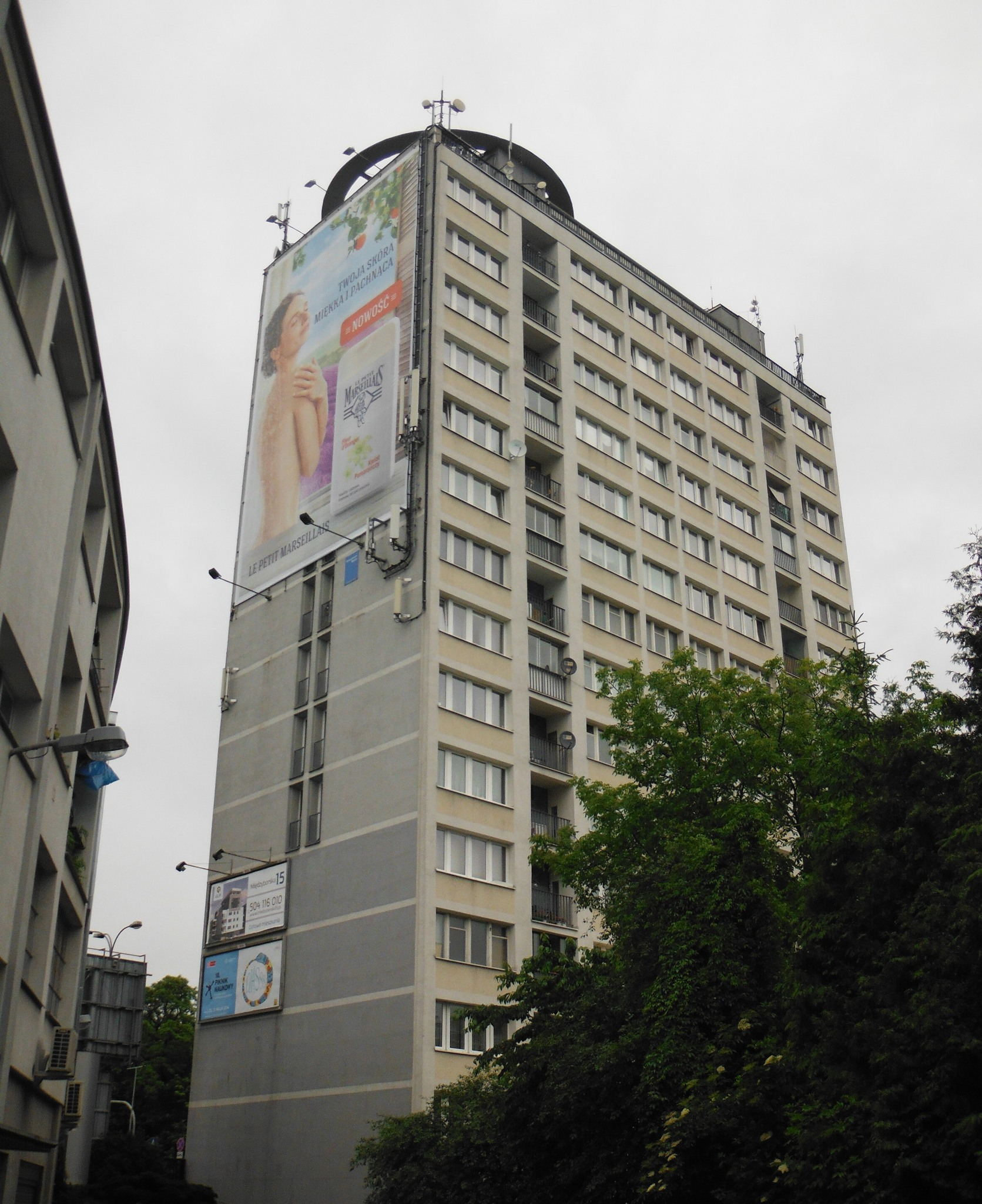
Modified 1960s high-rise (originally designed by Marek Leykam)

=== Sculptures ===
- Sztafeta – a 1955 sculpture by Adam Roman depicting three runners. Restored in 2008, it remains in its original material despite calls from artistic communities for a bronze casting.
- Bust of Ignacy Jan Paderewski – a bust by Stanisław Sikora on a tall pedestal, portraying the Polish prime minister and composer, patron of the nearby park. Unveiled in 1988 by Janina and Zbigniew Karol Porczyński.
- Bust of George Washington – a monument featuring a bust by Bronisław Koniuszy and a pedestal and spatial arrangement by Bronisław Kubica, erected before President George H. W. Bush's visit in July 1989 and unveiled in October 1989 by Edward Moskal. The bust of the first U.S. President stands on a granite pedestal.
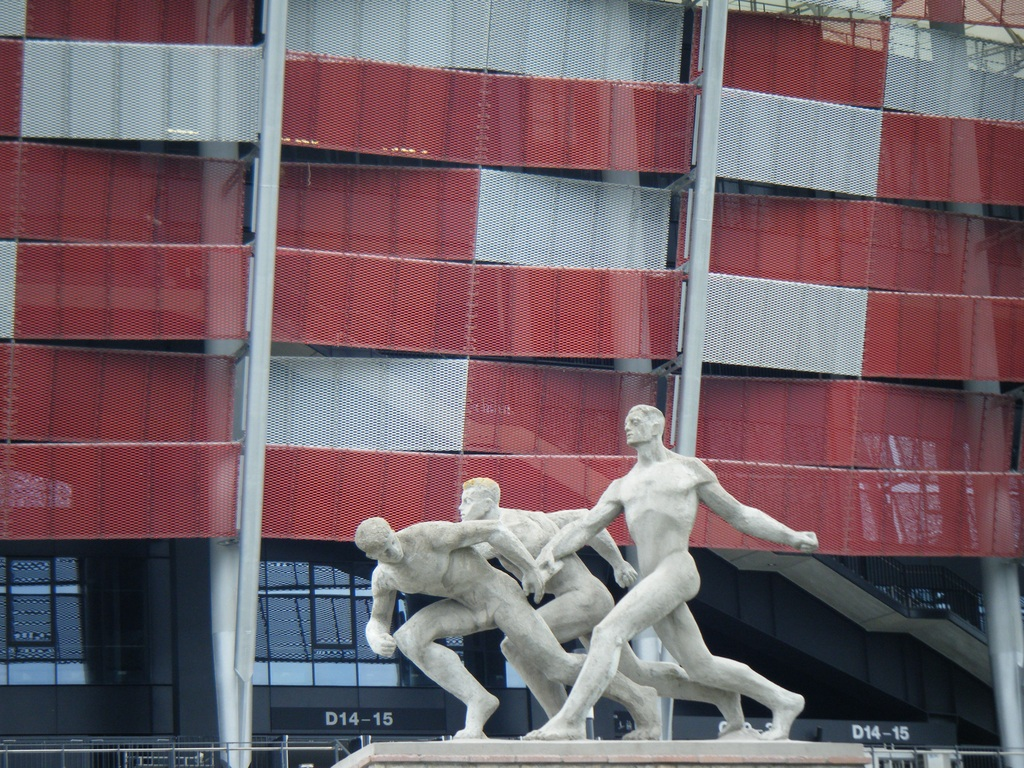
Sztafeta

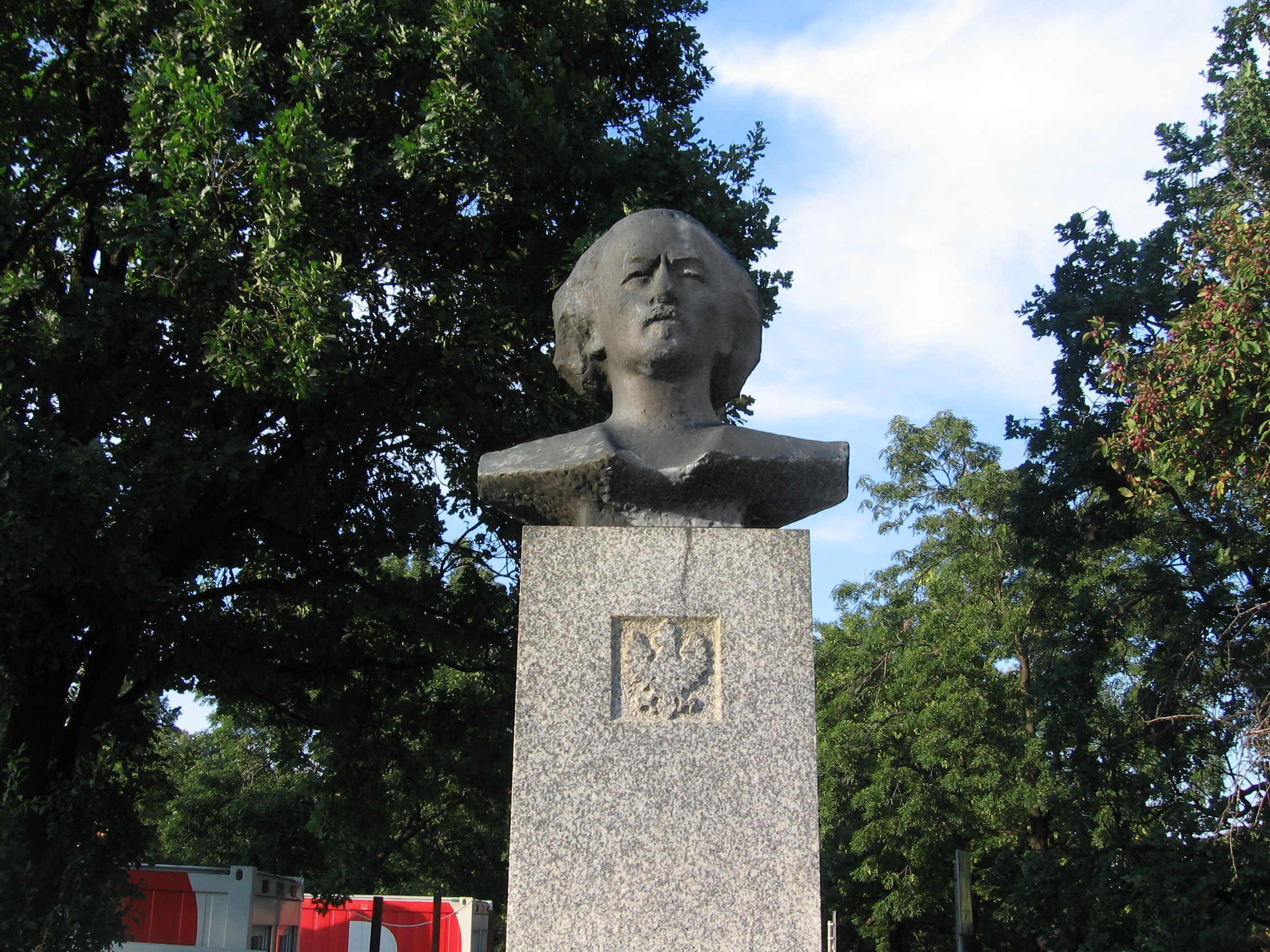
Ignacy Jan Paderewski bust

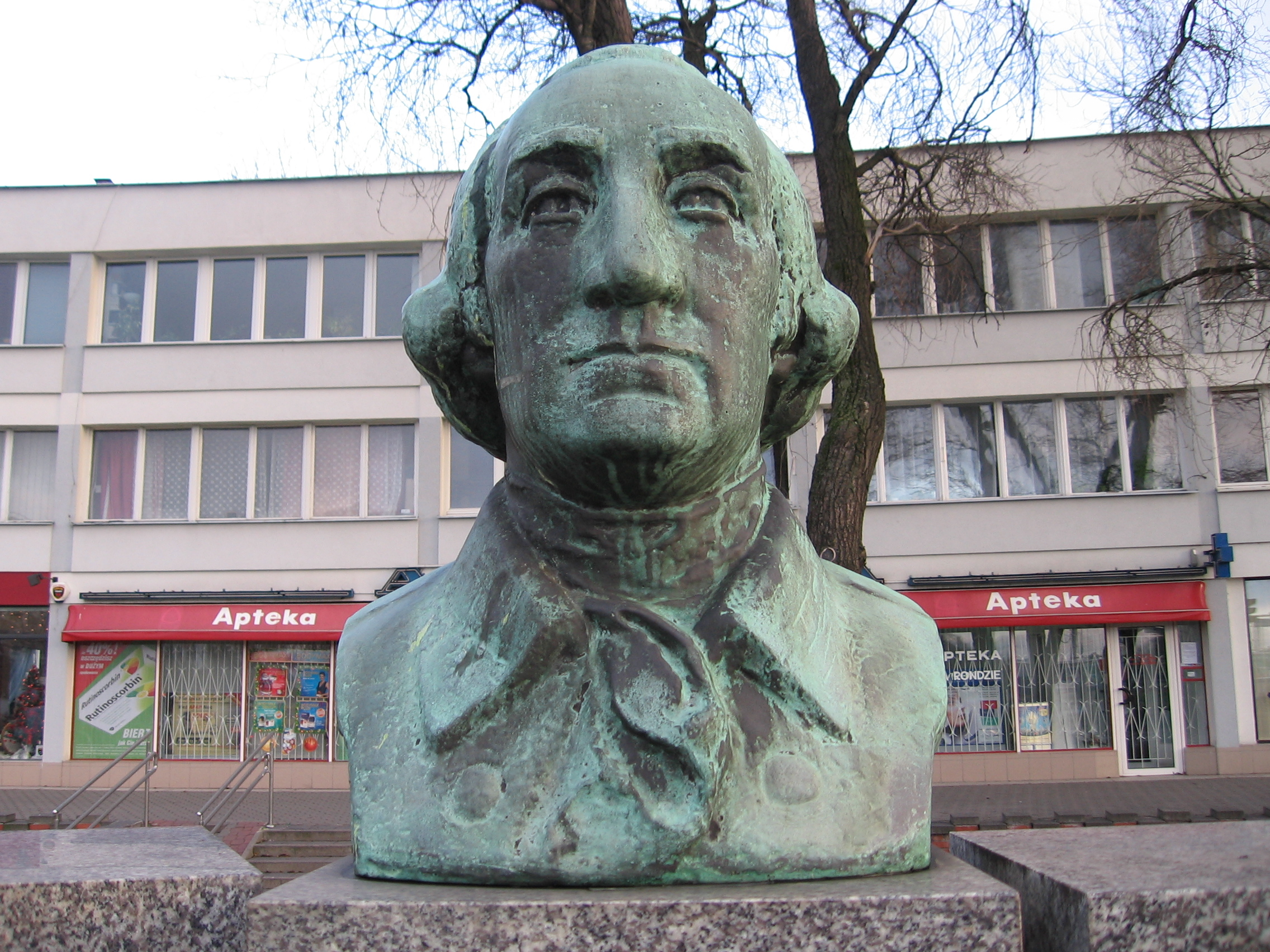
George Washington bust

== Public transport ==
The first tram line crossed the site in 1925, with a 1,525 mm gauge track running from the intersection of Jerusalem Avenue and New World Street to Targowa Street. Lines 7 and 12, previously using the Kierbedź Bridge, were rerouted here, followed by the new line 24 and circular line M. In 1942, a 1,525 mm gauge line was extended along Washington Avenue to Wiatraczna Roundabout. Post-war, in 1946, the tracks were converted to a 1,435 mm gauge.

The first bus line, unnumbered and seasonal, began operating in 1932, connecting New World Street to Skaryszew Park. In 1935, a permanent line S linked Saska Kępa estates to the tram stop at the roundabout.

== Bibliography ==
- Faryna-Paszkiewicz, Hanna (2001). Saska Kępa (in Polish). Warsaw: Murator. ISBN 83-915407-0-7.
