= Elsterska Street =

Street in Warsaw, Poland

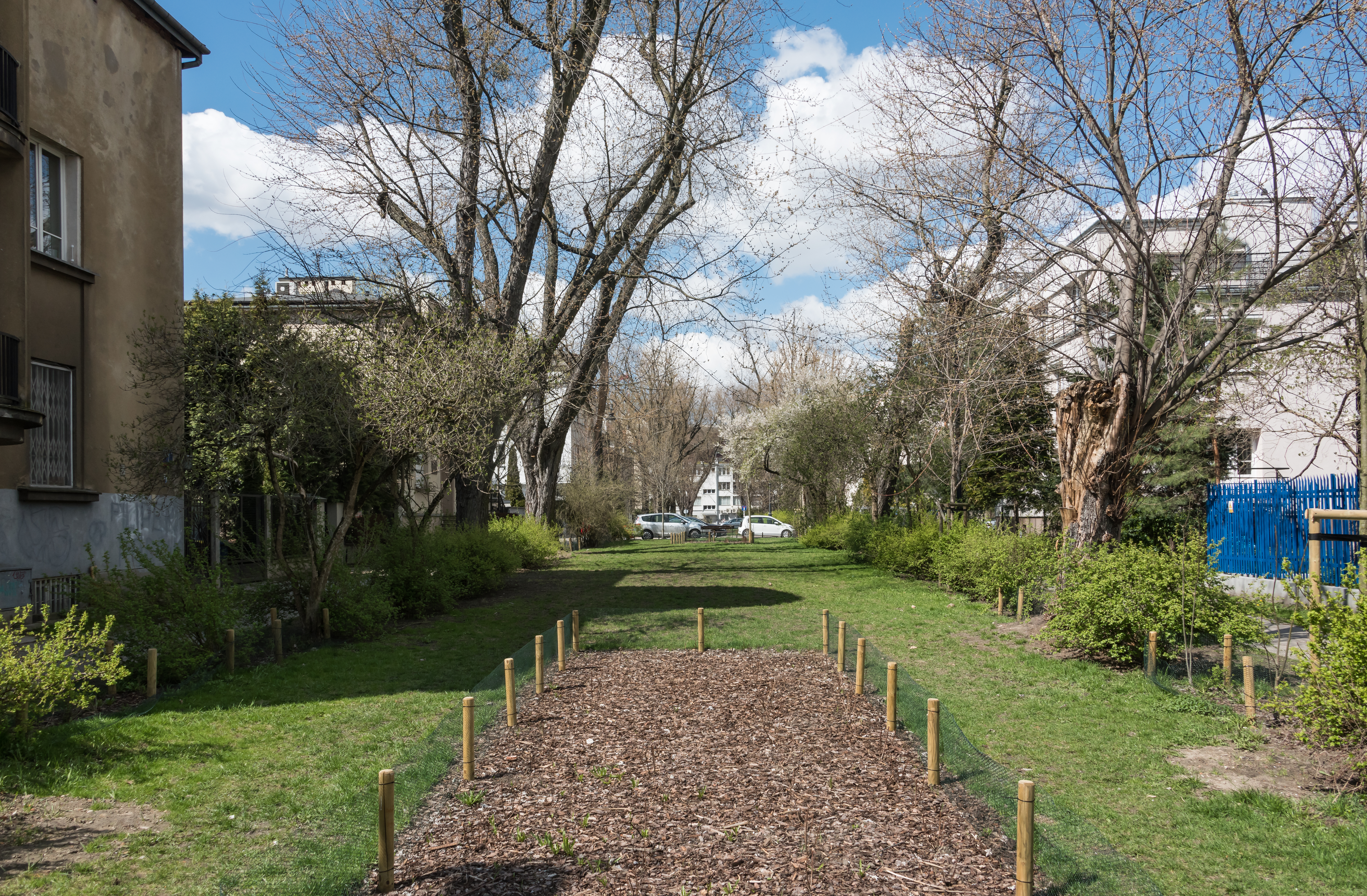
- Elsterska Street near Berezyńska Street
- Part of: Saska Kępa
- Location: Warsaw, Poland
- Coordinates: 52°14′14.8″N 21°03′13.9″E

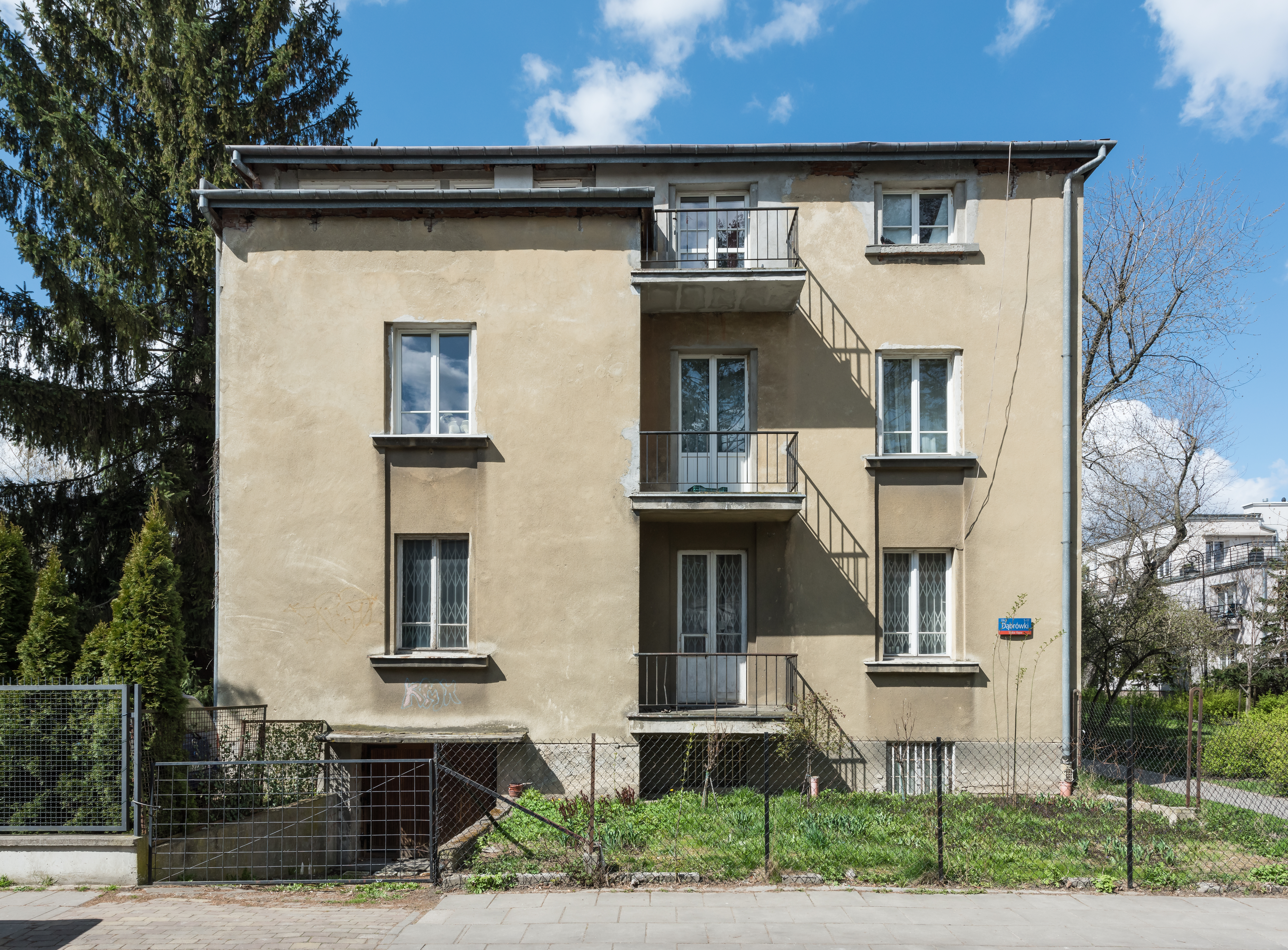
1 Elsterska Street: Różycki Villa (1935)

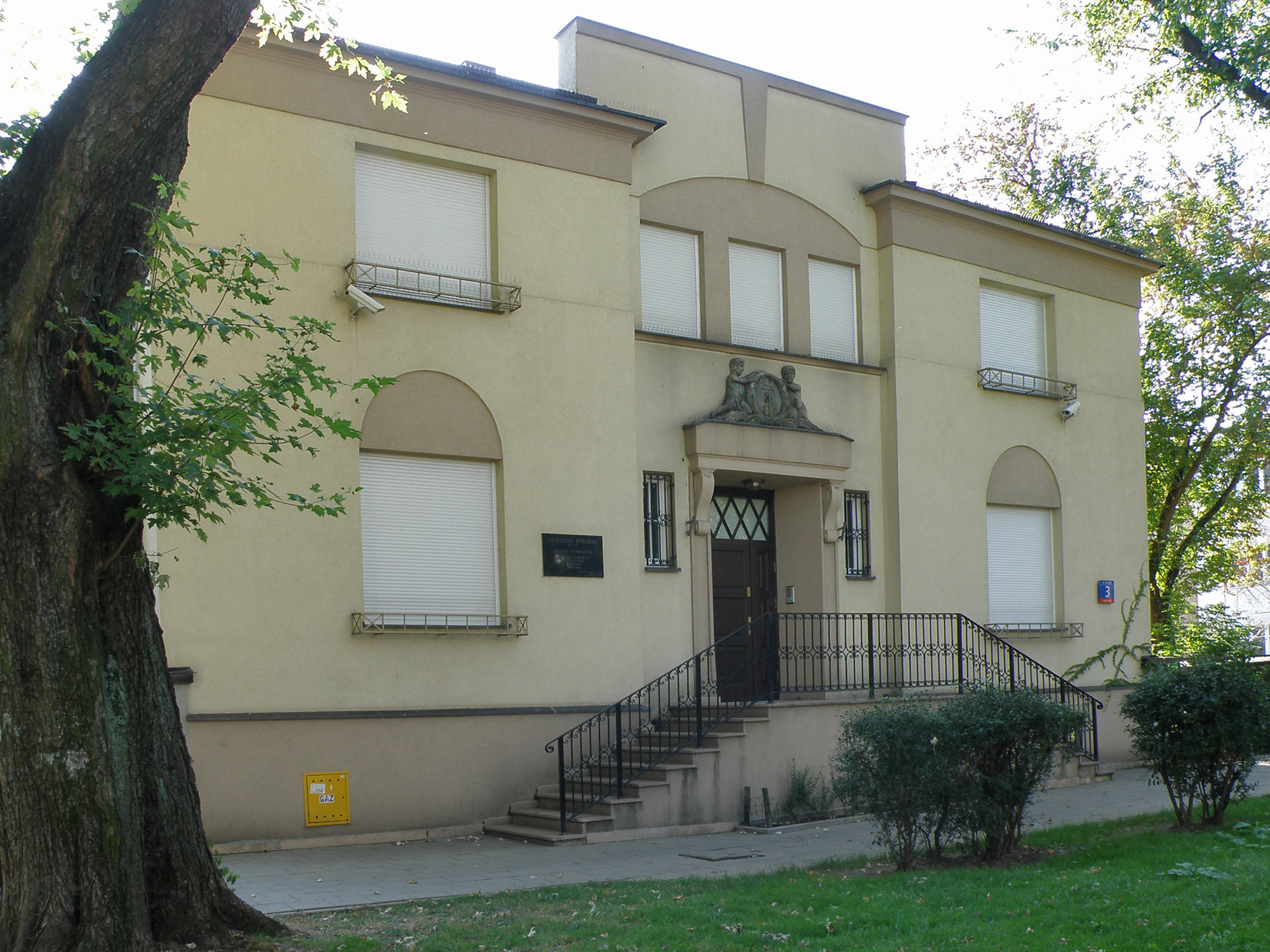
3 Elsterska Street: Villa of Grzegorz Fitelberg and Halina Szmolcówna (c. 1929–1930)

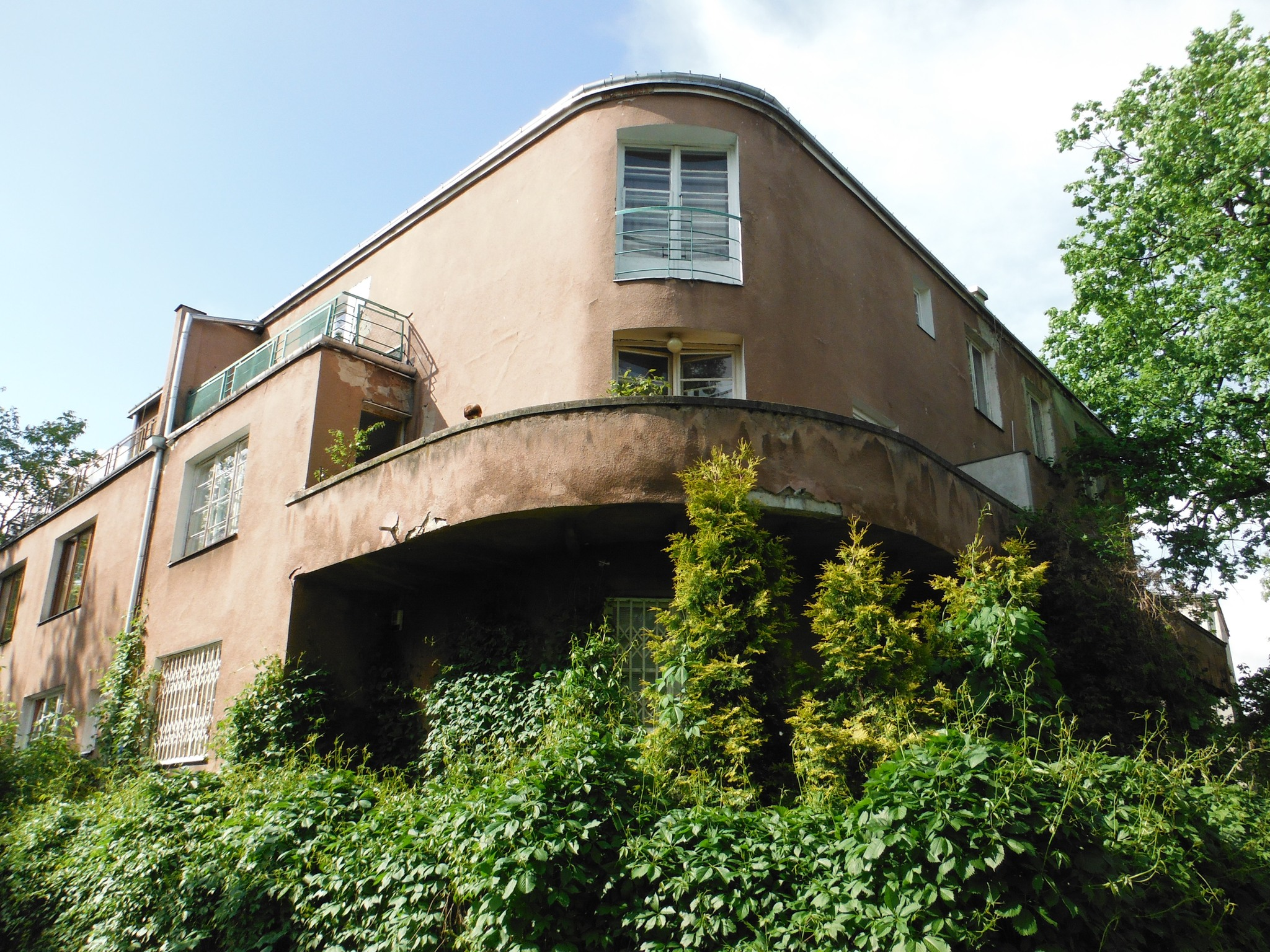
6 Elsterska Street: Villa of General Stanisław Burhardt-Bukacki and Engineer Szaniawski (c. 1931–1932)

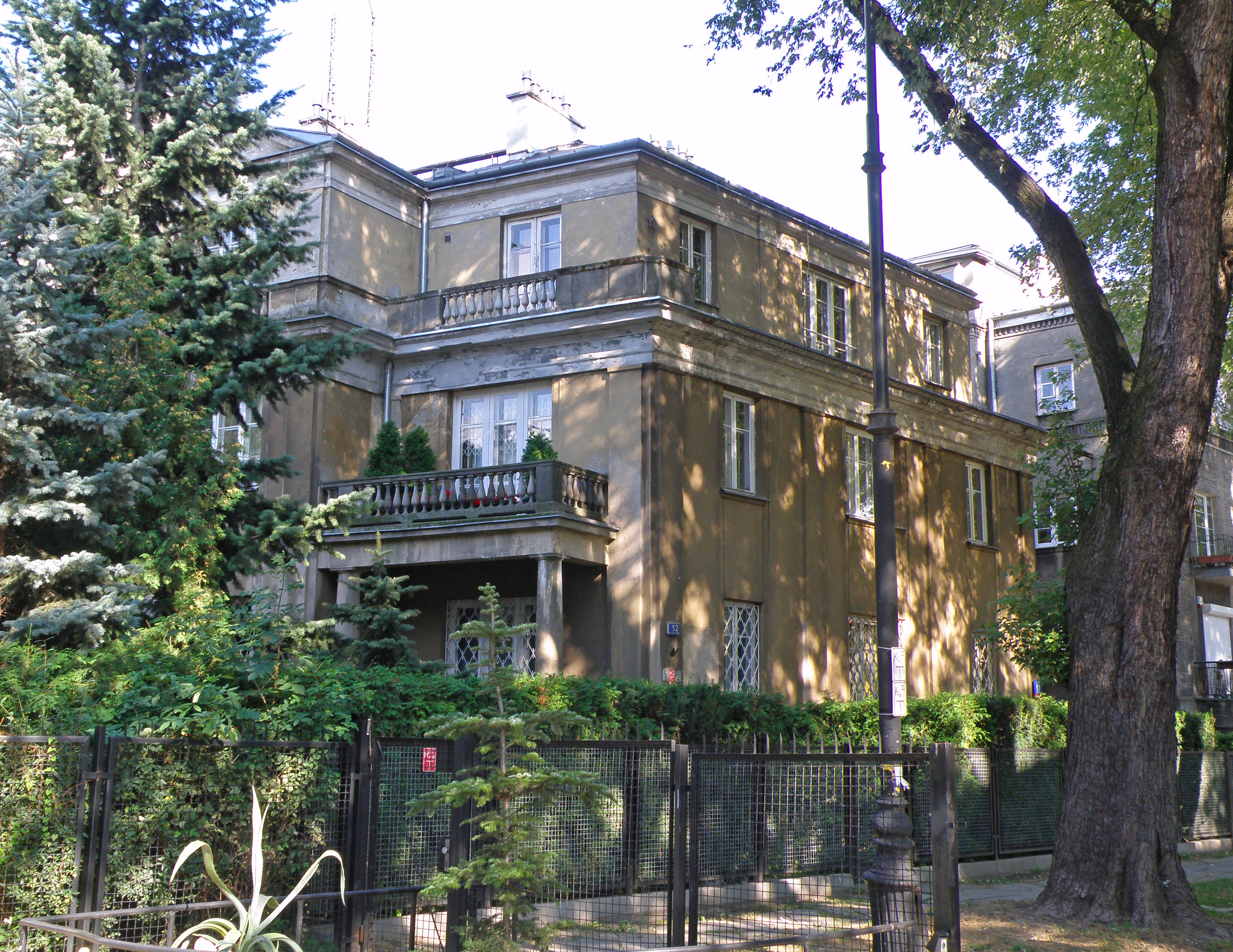
12 Elsterska Street: Villa from c. 1930

Elsterska Street is a street in the Saska Kępa district of Warsaw, Poland, running from the intersection with Dąbrówki Street to the intersection with Galijska Street. The street is lined with residential buildings, many of which date back to the interwar period (1918–1939), with several listed in the Polish Registry of Cultural Property. The street's name refers to the White Elster river, aligning with the naming convention of nearby streets that commemorate Prince Józef Poniatowski, who died in the Battle of Leipzig by drowning in the Elster river.

== History ==
The development of Elsterska Street began in the late 1920s and early 1930s. A 1931 issue of the weekly magazine Świat described the ongoing development of Saska Kępa: "It is in the process of being built and currently appears chaotic. Alongside beautifully developing streets like Obrońców, Elsterska, or Katowicka, there are still undeveloped, unfenced wastelands". By this time, a greenway had been established between the street's roadways. Between 1937 and 1938, flowerbeds were also added along Elsterska Street.

According to early urban plans, Elsterska Street was intended to be a main avenue of the new district. A 1922 zoning plan for Warsaw designated Elsterska as one of five streets radiating from George Washington Roundabout. This layout is evident in pre-war city maps.

== Notable buildings ==
- 1 Elsterska Street – Różycki Villa, built in 1935 and designed by Teodor Bursche. This building exemplifies the Art Deco style, featuring a semicircular bay window supported by stepped corbels and topped with a "captain's bridge". A semicircular terrace at the rear emphasizes the house's symmetry. It was added to the Registry of Cultural Property on 13 June 1979 under number 949 A.
- 3 Elsterska Street – Villa of Grzegorz Fitelberg and Halina Szmolcówna, constructed between 1929 and 1930, one of the oldest buildings on the street. Designed in a simplified academicism style with Rococo influences, it features minimal historical detailing except for distinctive sculpted putti supporting a cartouche with the initials of Fitelberg and Szmolcówna. The facade was restored in 2006. The house included a rehearsal room where Szmolcówna practiced and taught dance. A plaque commemorating the presence of the Alliance of Democrats' Main Board, which was headquartered there from 1944 to 1945, was replaced in 1996 with one honoring a notable resident.
- 6 Elsterska Street – Villa of General Stanisław Burhardt-Bukacki and Engineer Szaniawski, built between 1931 and 1932 and designed by Wilhelm Henneberg and Chwalisław Kopeć. The building reflects the Streamline Moderne style but is considered less refined compared to other contemporary structures in the area due to its execution. Notable residents included Count Alfred Wielopolski, Edmund Wierciński, Kazimierz Reyman, and Józef Kulczycki.
- 9 Elsterska Street – Home of Colonel Camillo Perini.
- 10 Elsterska Street – A three-story building from the 1930s with extensions and two garages, clad in gray cement brick. A relief of the Virgin Mary adorns the entrance. The house belonged to Leopold Zathey, a legionnaire and sapper captain, his wife Feliksa, and the Dyrda family. Residents included Andrzej Zathey, a scout from the 5th Warsaw Scout Troop who died at 17 defending Lviv in September 1939, and his brother Ryszard Zathey, a 16-year-old Home Army soldier with the codename Ryś, who fought in the Ruczaj Battalion during the Warsaw Uprising. The building was added to the Registry of Cultural Property on 2 September 2016 under number A-1348.
- 12 Elsterska Street – A villa from around 1930, designed in the Neoclassical style reminiscent of Polish manor houses. It was home to Ludwik Bar. It was added to the Registry of Cultural Property on 13 June 1979 under number 973 A.

== Gallery ==
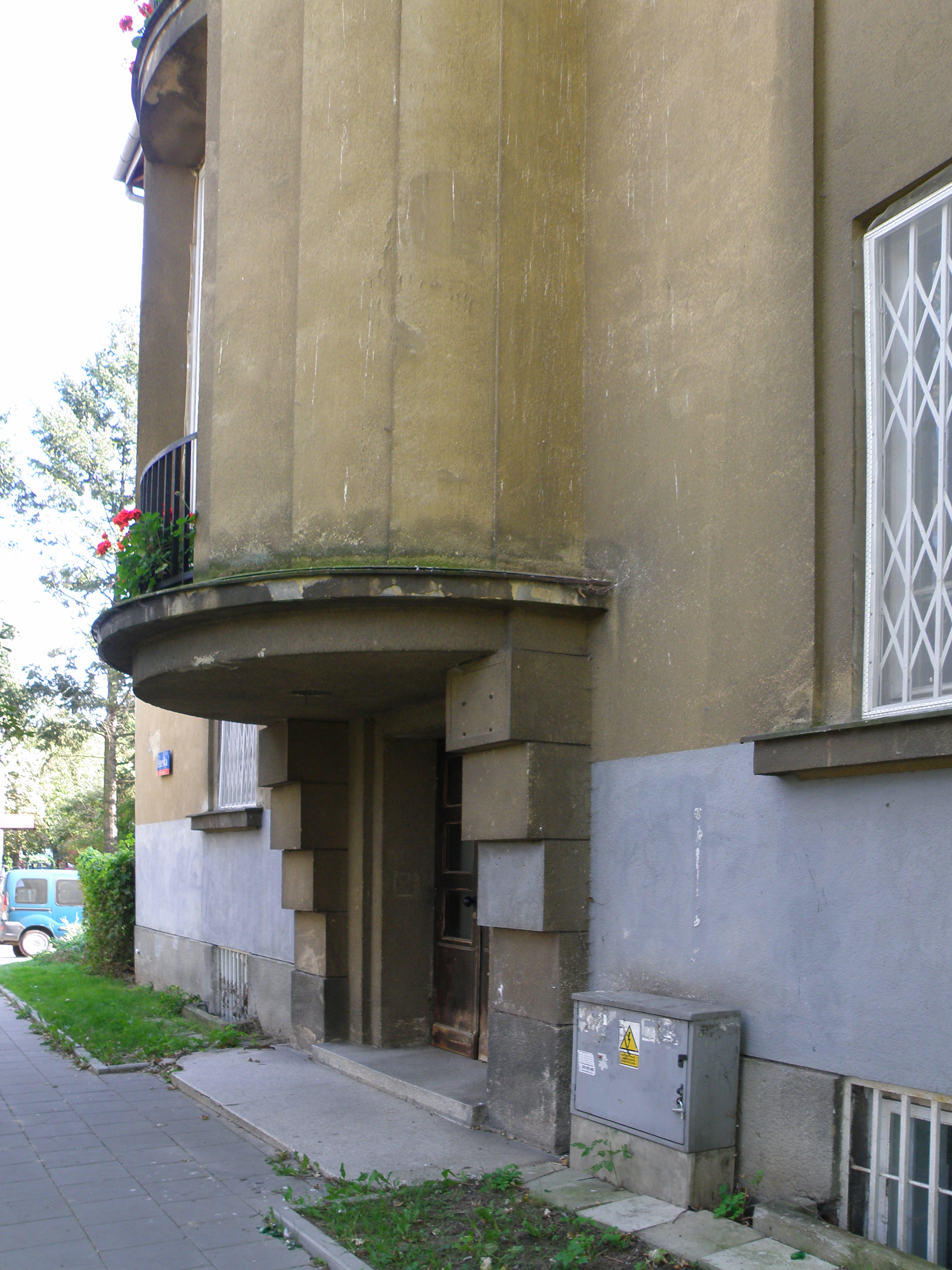
1 Elsterska Street: Stepped corbels

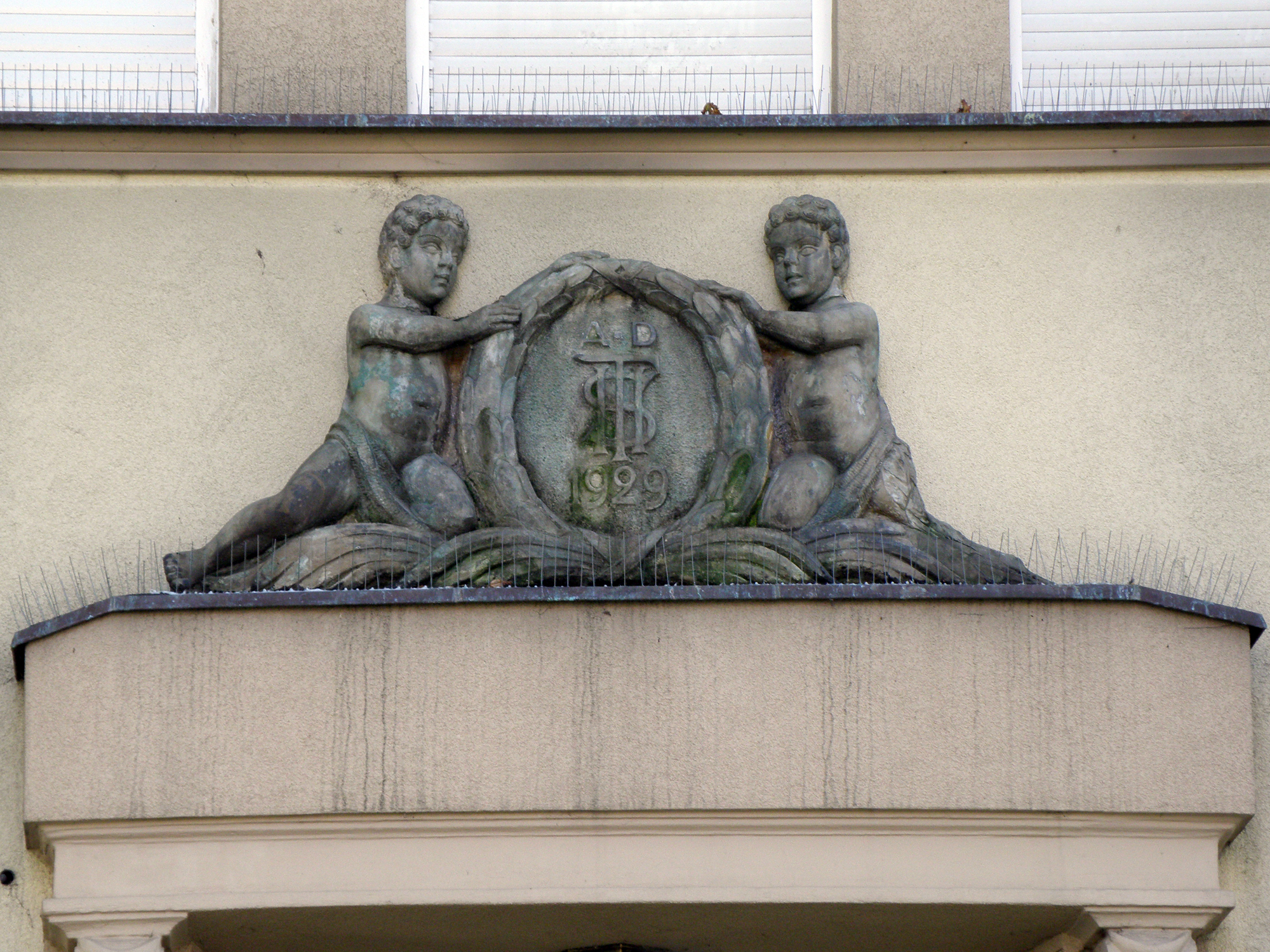
3 Elsterska Street: Decorative cartouche

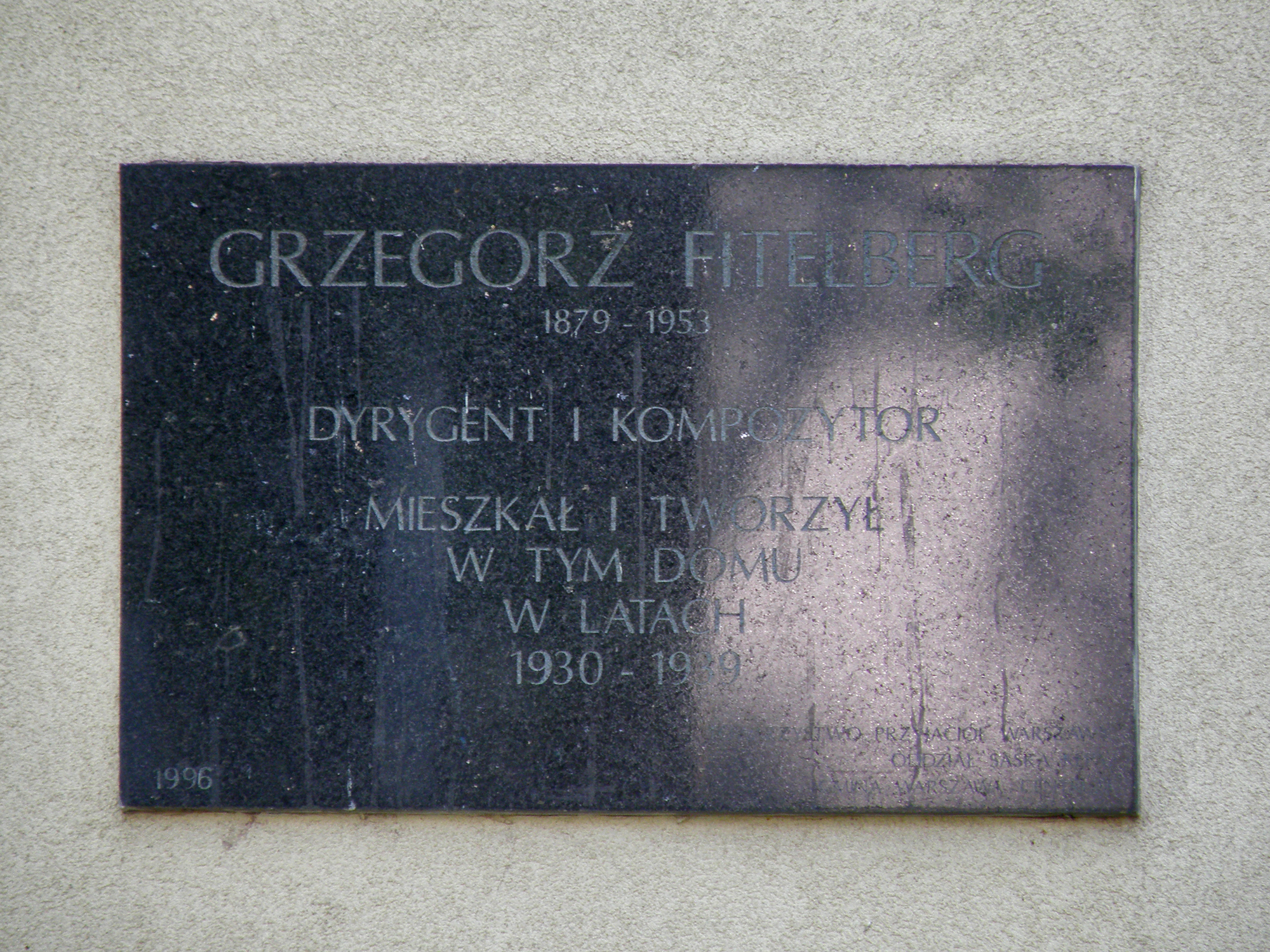
3 Elsterska Street: Commemorative plaque

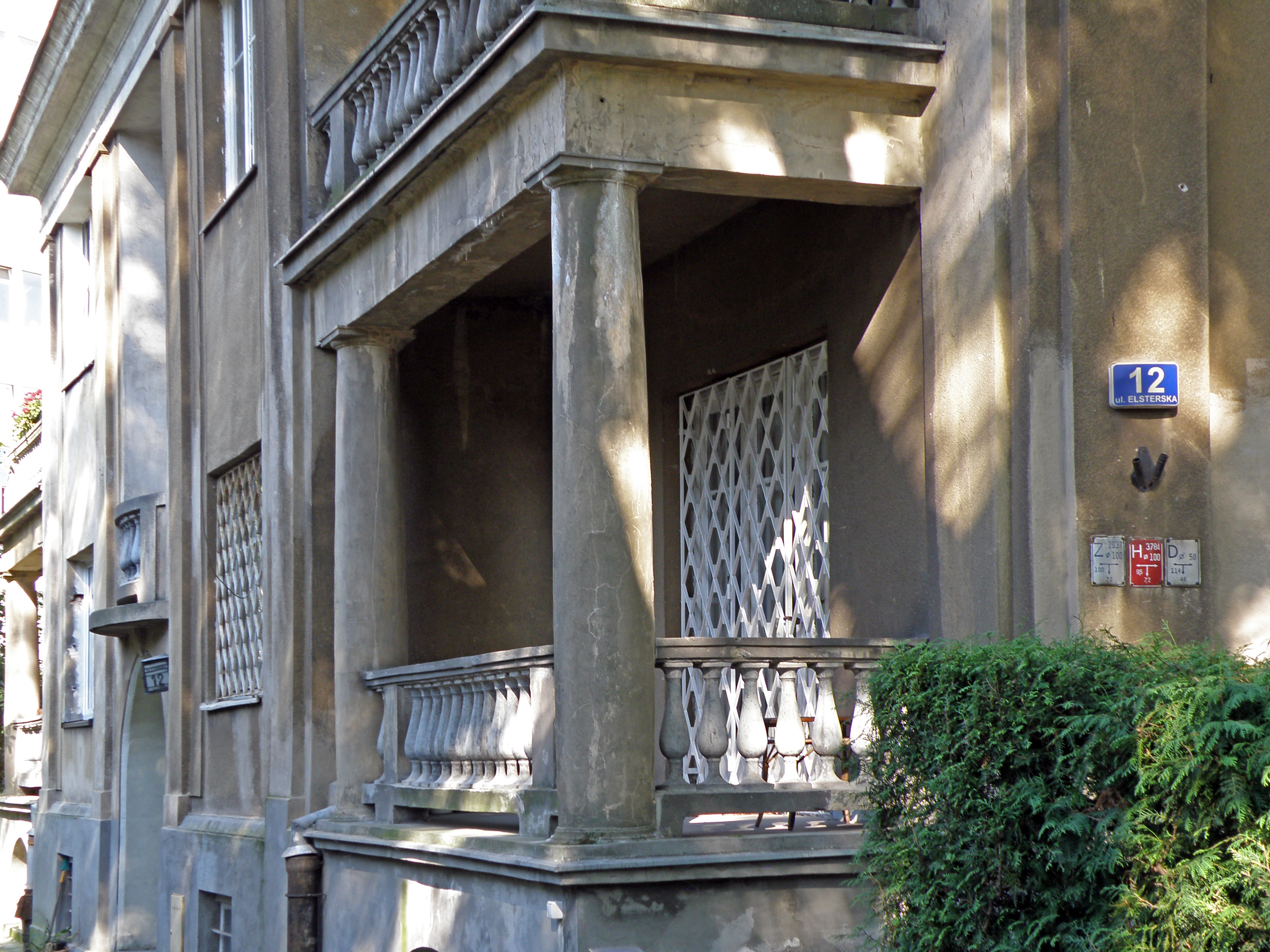
12 Elsterska Street

== Bibliography ==
- Faryna-Paszkiewicz, Hanna (2001). Saska Kępa (in Polish). Warsaw: Murator. ISBN 83-915407-0-7.
