= Bust of Ignacy Jan Paderewski =

Monument in Warsaw, Poland

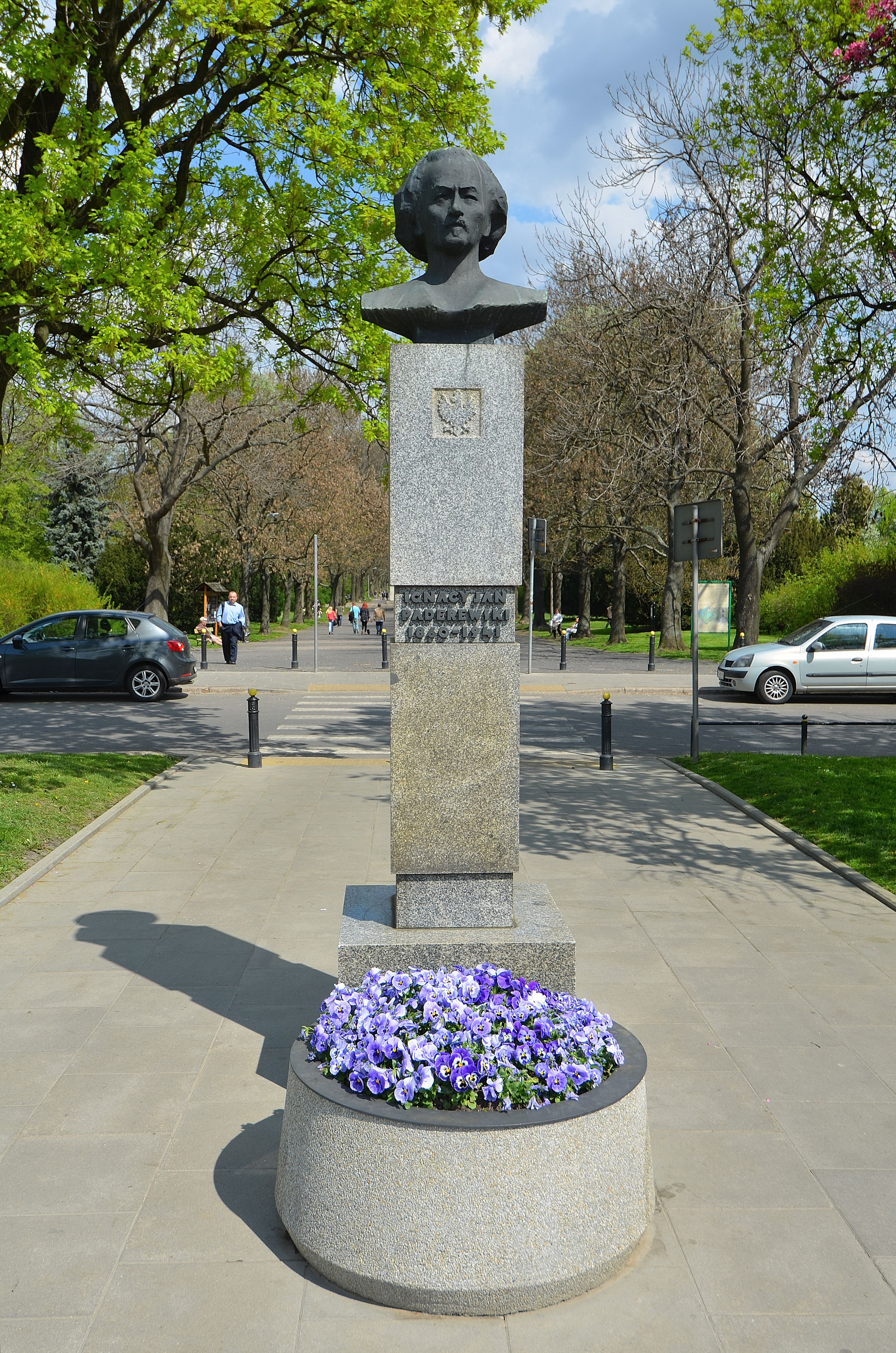
- The sculpture in 2014
- Interactive map of Bust of Ignacy Jan Paderewski
- Location: Skaryszew Park, Praga-South, Warsaw, Poland
- Coordinates: 52°14′19.20″N 21°03′08.02″E
- Designer: Stanisław Sikora
- Type: Bust
- Material: Bronze (bust); granite (pedestal)
- Opening date: 1989
- Dedicated to: Ignacy Jan Paderewski

The bust of Ignacy Jan Paderewski (Polish pronunciation: [iɡˈnatsɘ̟ ˈjan padɛˈrɛfskʲi]; Polish: popiersie Ignacego Jana Paderewskiego) is a monument in the city of Warsaw, Poland, placed in the Skaryszew Park, next to the George Washington Roundabout. It is located within the neighbourhood of Saska Kępa, in the Praga-South district. The monument is dedicated to Ignacy Jan Paderewski, a 20th-century pianist, composer and statesman who was a spokesman for the Polish independence. It was designed by Stanisław Sikora, and unveiled in 1989. It takes a form of a bronze bust placed on a granite pedestal.

== History ==
The sculpture was financed by art collectors Zbigniew Karol Porczyński and Janina Porazińska, and was designed by Stanisław Sikora. It was unveiled in 1989.

== Design ==
The monument consists of a bronze bust of Ignacy Jan Paderewski, placed on top of a granite pedestal, which features a relief of the coat of arms of Poland in form of an eagle, and the inscription which reads "Ignacy Jan Paderewski; 1860–1941".

== See also ==
- Statue of Ignacy Jan Paderewski, another monument dedicated to Paderewski in Warsaw
