= 2B George Washington Avenue tower block =

Residential building in Warsaw, Poland

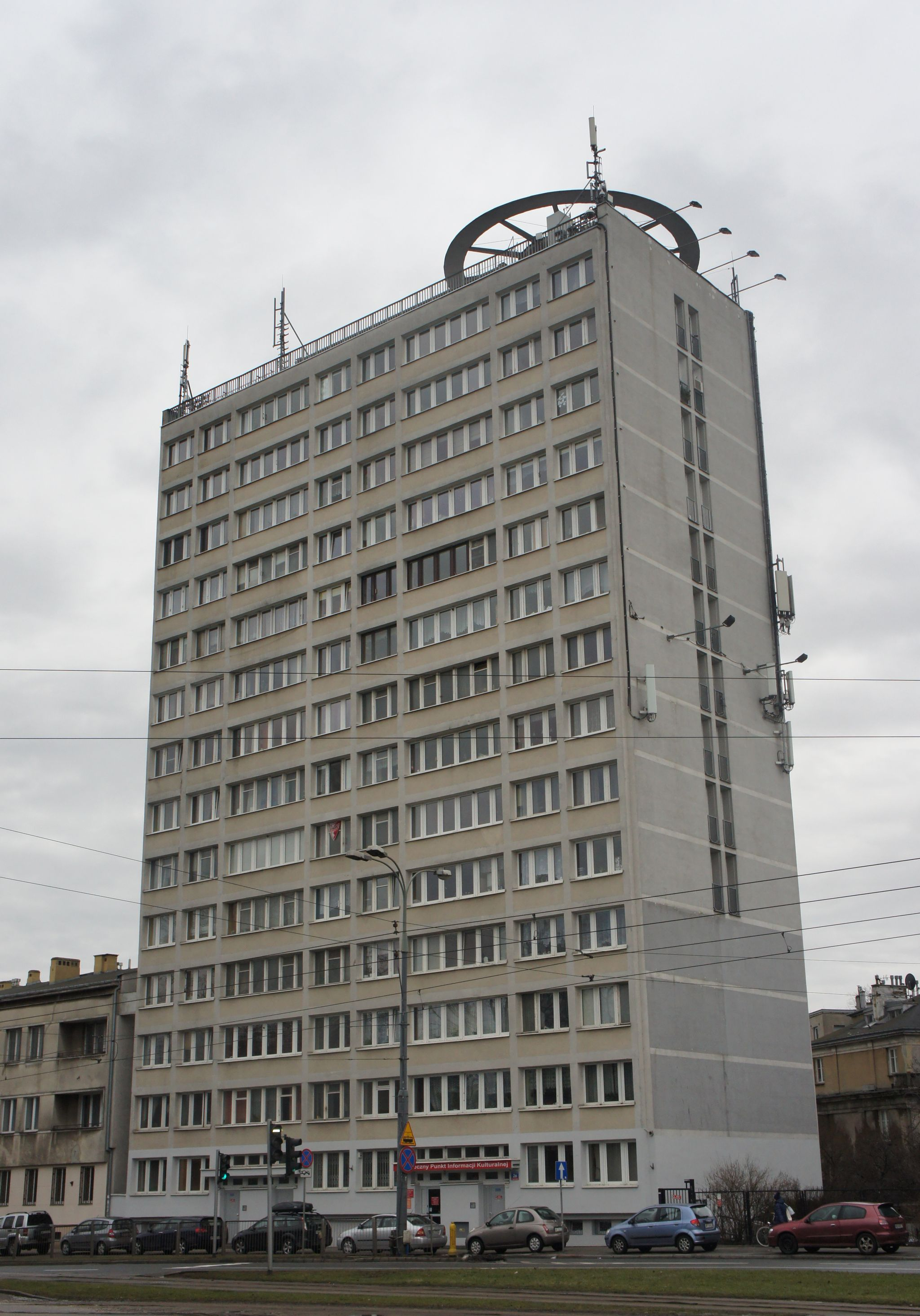
- The building in 2019.
- Interactive map of the 2B George Washington Avenue tower block area

General information
- Type: Tower block
- Architectural style: Modernism
- Location: 2B George Washington Avenue, Praga-South, Warsaw, Poland
- Coordinates: 52°14′17.50″N 21°03′12.20″E
- Construction started: 1962
- Completed: 1963

Technical details
- Floor count: 13

Design and construction
- Architect: Marek Leykam

The 2B George Washington Avenue tower block is a modernist residential tower block in the city of Warsaw, Poland. It is located at 2B George Washington Avenue, next to the George Washington Roundabout, in the neighbourhood of Saska Kępa, within the Praga-South district. It was designed by architect Marek Leykam, and built in 1963. It is an early example of modernist architecture in Poland, and upon construction, it was the first tower block building constructed on the right bank of Vistula river in Warsaw, and the first building in the city, with at least one wall with fully glass-covered elevation.

== History ==
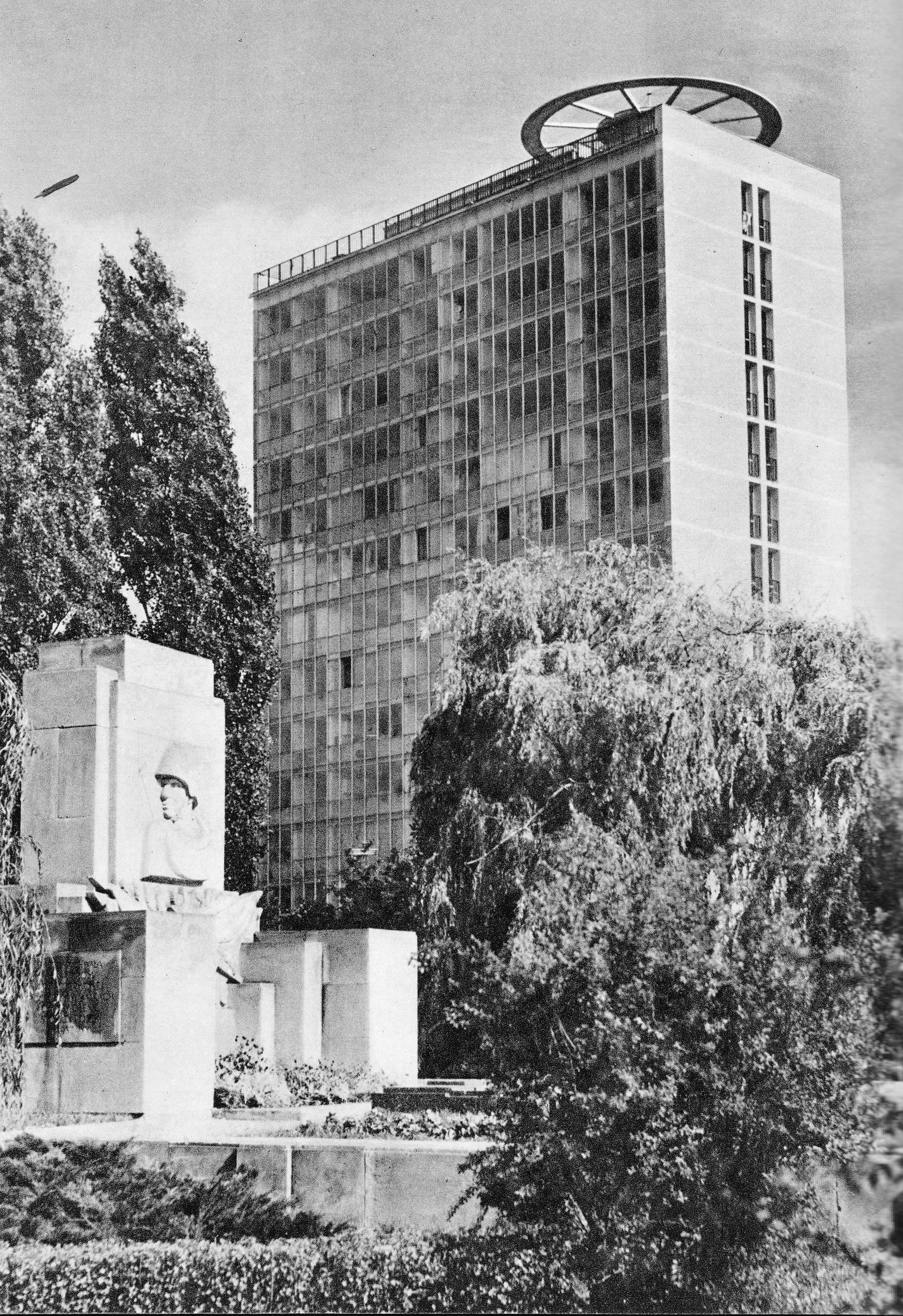
The building in the 1960s.

The building was commissioned by the housing cooperative of Wspólny Dach. It was designed by architect Marek Leykam in modernist style, and was built between 1962 and 1963. The building was originally constructed with its south and north walls featuring elevation fully covered in glass windows, which reached from floor to ceiling. The sides with wall-spanning glass windows were held by concrete V-shaped supports, one on each side. The tower block building also had lift shafts partially covered in glass, through which were visible the loggias. The building included numerous apartments and a library. It was also planned to feature a revolving restaurant at the roof, which was never implemented. A concrete circle remains at the top of the roof, left behind from the unfinished plan.

The glass elevation was badly isolated, causing the apartments to experience very high temperatures in the summers, and very cold temperatures in the winters. Many inhabitants also complained about lack of privacy. In 1973 the glass elevation was replaced by brick walls and two-times smaller windows. The characteristic V-shaped concrete supports at the base of the building, and the windows of lift shafts, were also removed. In 1968, a turret clock and a neon sign advertising the store Jubiler were placed on the roof of the building. They were removed in the 1990s.

== Characteristics and design ==
The apartment building has 13 storeys. On its roof, it features a concrete circle, which was originally placed there as foundation of a planned revolving restaurant which was never constructed. The elevation of south and north walls of the building is covered in brick walls and glass windows. Originally, the building was designed and built with aforementioned elevations fully covered in glass windows, which extended from floors to ceilings, and were replaced in 1973. The building also features a library.

== In popular culture ==
The photography of the building, for its innovative design as an early example of modernist architecture in Poland, had been used to depict the entry "Polish architecture" (architektura polska) in the encyclopedia of Wielka Encyklopedia Powszechna PWN (lit. 'Great Universal Encyclopedia of National Scientific Publishers').
