= Statue of Ignacy Jan Paderewski =

Monument in Warsaw, Poland

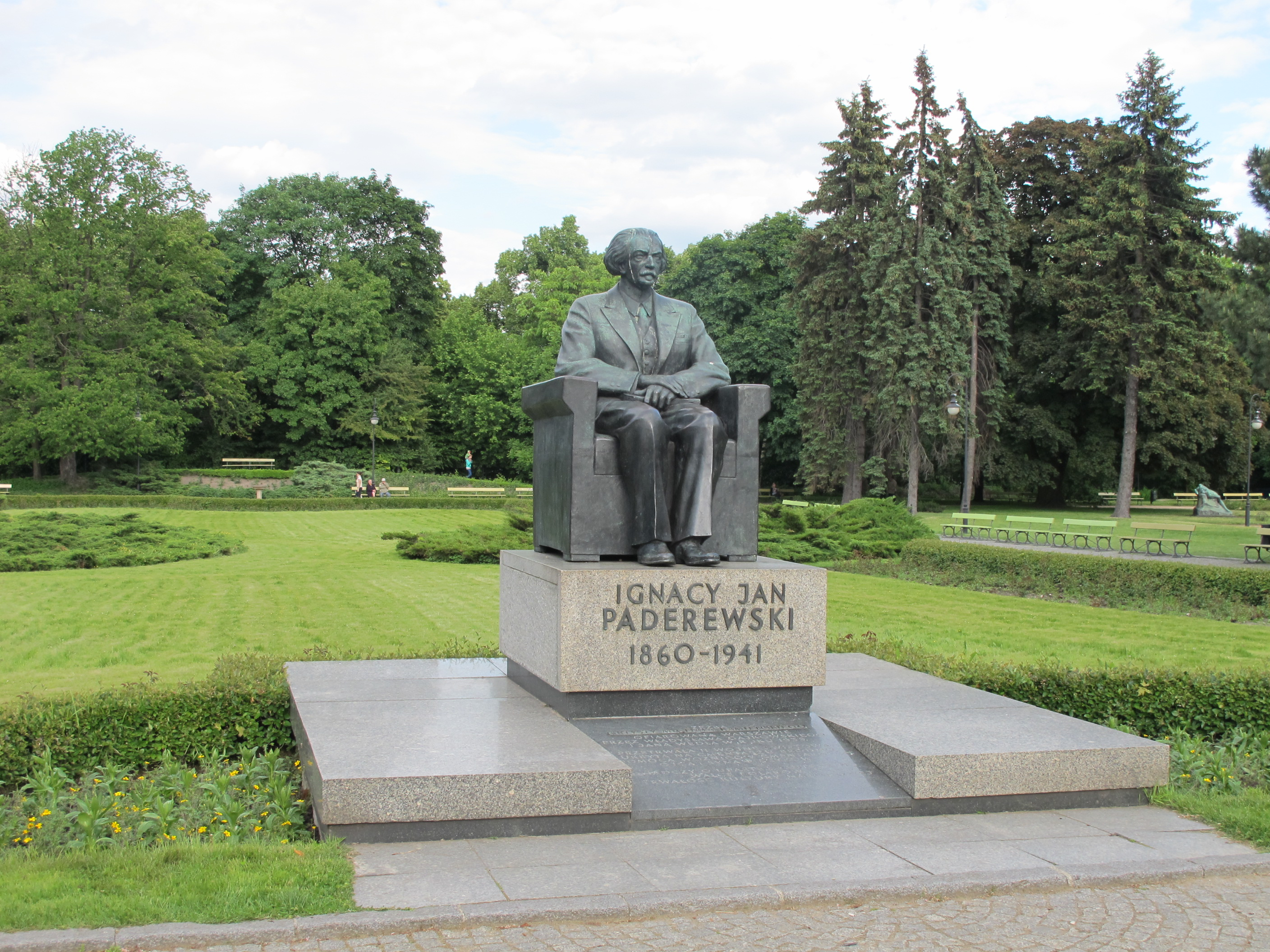
- The monument in 2012.
- Interactive map of Statue of Ignacy Jan Paderewski
- Location: Ujazdów Park, Downtown, Warsaw, Poland
- Coordinates: 52°13′19.40″N 21°01′31.08″E
- Designer: Michał Kamieński
- Type: Statue
- Material: Bronze
- Height: 2.5 m (8 ft 2 in)
- Completion date: 1939
- Opening date: 1977 (original location); 1985 (current location)
- Dedicated to: Ignacy Jan Paderewski

The statue of Ignacy Jan Paderewski (Polish: Pomnik Ignacego Jana Paderewskiego) is a monument in Warsaw, Poland, located in the Ujazdów Park, near the corner of Róż and Ujazdów Avenues. It is dedicated to Ignacy Jan Paderewski, a 20th-century pianist, composer and statesman who was a spokesman for the Polish independence. Made in 1939, it was designed by Michał Kamieński. It was hidden during the Second World War, and in 1977, it was placed in the courtyard of the Warsaw National Museum. In 1978, it was moved to Okólnik Street, next to the Ostrogski Palace, and again in 1985 to its current location.

== History ==
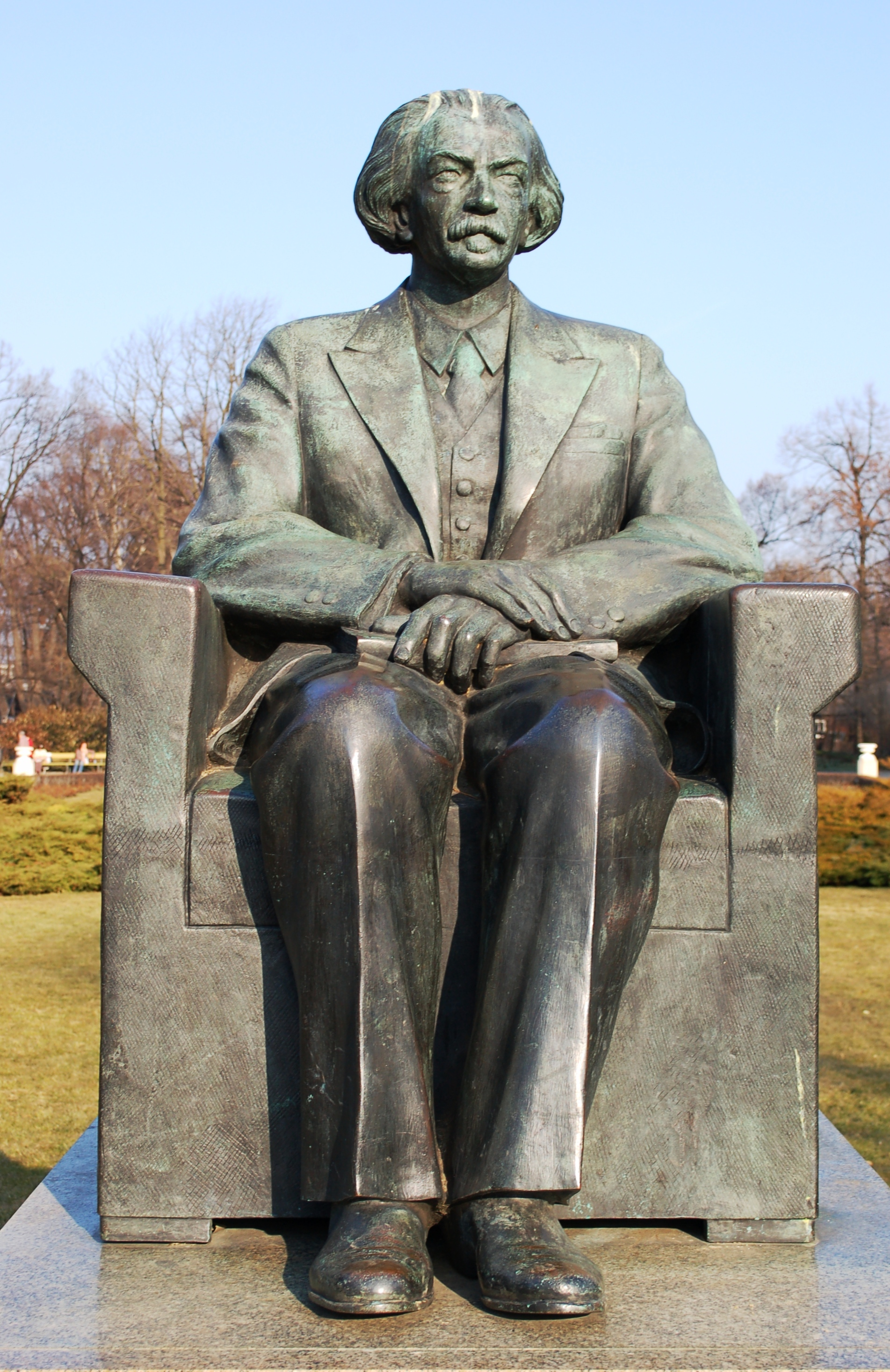
The statue of Ignacy Jan Paderewski.

The monument dedicated to Ignacy Jan Paderewski was proposed by the Polish diaspora in 1937. It was designed by Michał Kamieński, and manufactured in 1939 in Warsaw, shortly before the outbreak of the Second World War. While the city was under the occupation, German officers marked the sculpture to be melted. However, it was saved by the owners and employees of Czesław Chojnowski's metallurgy workshops, who broke the sculpture apart and buried it in pieces on the premises. In 1942, it was moved to a new hiding location at the Bródno Cemetery.

After the liberation of the city in 1944, the sculpture was dug out, put together, and displayed in front of the metallurgy workshops. Chojnowski unsuccessfully attempted to contact former committee members responsible for the sculpture's creation. Later, it was given under the care of Władysław Gajkowsk, who kept it at his father-in-law's possession. Following his death, the monument was acquired by the government in 1956, and stored in the warehouse of the Museum of Warsaw. Later, it was transported to Łopieński Brothers' workshop for renovations. It was unsuccessfully planned to unveil the sculpture in a public place in 1971, for the 30th anniversary of Michał Kamieński's death. In 1977, thanks to historian Stanisław Lorentz, the monument was placed at the inner courtyard of the Warsaw National Museum. Concurrently, Lorentz and the Friends of Warsaw Association began collecting funds to unveil the sculpture outdoors in a public setting.

On 16 September 1978, the statue was unveiled at Okólnik Street, next to the Ostrogski Palace and the Chopin University of Music, which was Padarewski's alma mater Previously, it was considered to place it in the Ignacy Jan Paderewski Skaryszew Park. In 1985, the sculpture was moved to the Ujazdów Park, near the corner of Róż and Ujazdów Avenues.

== Overview ==
The monument measures around 2.5 m. It includes a bronze statue of Ignacy Jan Paderewski, depicted sitting in a chair, and wearing a suit. It is placed on a small cubic pedestal, with the inscription, which reads "'Ignacy Paderewski 1860–1941". The pavement in front of it includes a plaque with the following Polish inscription:

Polish inscription

Rzeźba artysty Michała Kamieńskiego ofiarowana Warszawie przez Władysława Gajkowskiego i Jana Wedla w roku 1939. Przetrwała II wojnę światową ukryta na cmentarzu Bródno z pomocą woźniców cmentarnych ojca i syna Piecyków. Świadczy o upartej i skutecznej walce Polaków o trwałość kultury narodowej.

Translation:
English translation

The sculpture by artist Michał Kamieński, given to Warsaw by Władysław Gajkowski and Jan Wedel in 1939. It survived the Second World War, hidden at the Bródno Cemetery, with the use of the cemetery carts of father and son Piecyks. It is the testament to the stubborn and effective struggle of Poles for the durability of their national culture.

== See also ==
- Bust of Ignacy Jan Paderewski, another monument dedicated to Paderewski in Warsaw
