= The Relay Race (sculpture) =

Figurative sculpture by Adam Roman in Warsaw

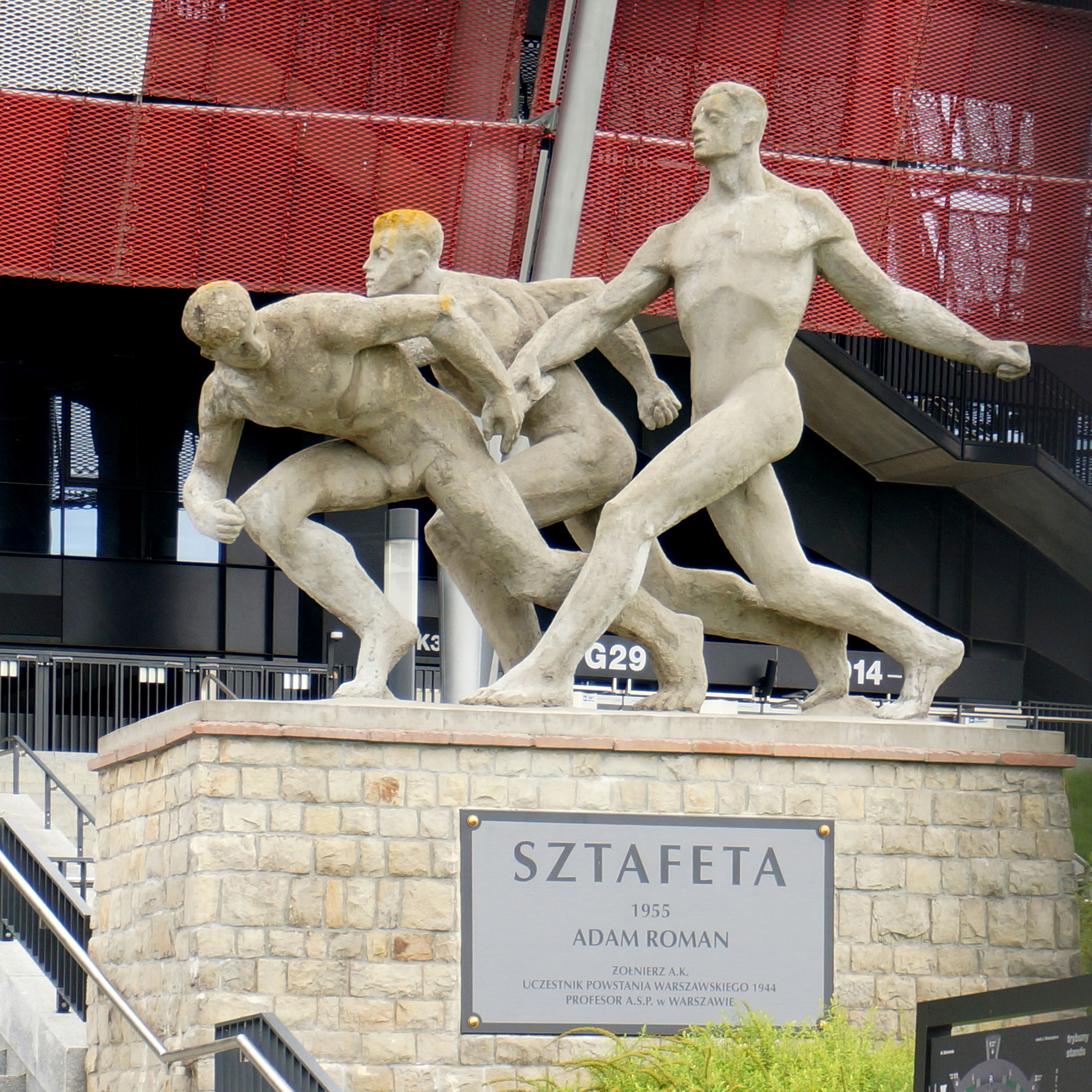
- Interactive map of The Relay Race
- Location: Warsaw, near Stadion Narodowy
- Coordinates: 52°14′17.14″N 21°02′50.25″E
- Designer: Adam Roman
- Type: Figurative sculpture
- Material: Concrete on steel frame
- Height: 4.5 m (15 ft)
- Completion date: 1955
- Opening date: 22 July 1955
- Restored date: 2008

The Relay Race is a figurative architectural sculpture by Adam Roman, depicting three nude runners, two in the act of passing a baton. It is located near George Washington Roundabout in Warsaw, at the entrance to Stadion Narodowy (Gate 3) from Józef Poniatowski Avenue.

== Creation ==
The sculpture drew inspiration from the relief La Marseillaise by François Rude on the Arc de Triomphe in Paris, and was modeled after drawings on Greek vases. Initially planned with two runners, Adam Roman added a third figure. The sculpture was originally intended for the stairs in Marshal Edward Rydz-Śmigły Park in Powiśle. However, Professor Jerzy Hryniewiecki, designer of the 10th-Anniversary Stadium, advocated for its placement at Stadion Narodowy, leading to a change in location.

Created in haste for the stadium's inauguration, the sculpture was made as a concrete model on a steel frame, approximately 2 m tall, placed on a 2.5 m stone-clad pedestal. It was unveiled on 22 July 1955. Plans to replace it with a bronze cast after the 5th World Festival of Youth and Students were abandoned.

== Restoration ==
Due to the use of less durable concrete, the sculpture deteriorated quickly. Following requests from the Kamionek Neighborhood Council, Warsaw's conservator-restorer, and a July 2007 resolution by the Warsaw City Council, the National Sports Centre approved its restoration during Stadion Narodowy's construction. In November 2008, Jacek Nowicki restored the sculpture for 50,000 PLN.

In 2010, Aleksandra Wałdowska proposed replacing the original with a bronze cast, supported by the National Museum in Warsaw, which planned to house the original in Królikarnia, and the Inter-University Institute of Conservation and Restoration of Works of Art at Warsaw's Academy of Fine Arts. Professor Andrzej Józef Koss coordinated the project.

From 7 to 31 March 2011, an exhibition titled "Adam Roman – Time of Sztafeta" was held at the Olympic Centre in Warsaw, focusing on the sculpture's creation and history, with Adam Roman attending the vernissage. The exhibition aimed to attract sponsors for the bronze cast project, estimated at 400,000–800,000 PLN. A second edition occurred from 17 to 27 May 2011 at the Faculty of Architecture of the Warsaw University of Technology.

On 23 August 2013, at the initiative of the Warsaw Branch of the Association of Polish Artists and Designers, a granite plaque designed by Ryszard Stry was placed on the pedestal to commemorate Adam Roman, who had died six months earlier.
