= Stanisław Burhardt-Bukacki =

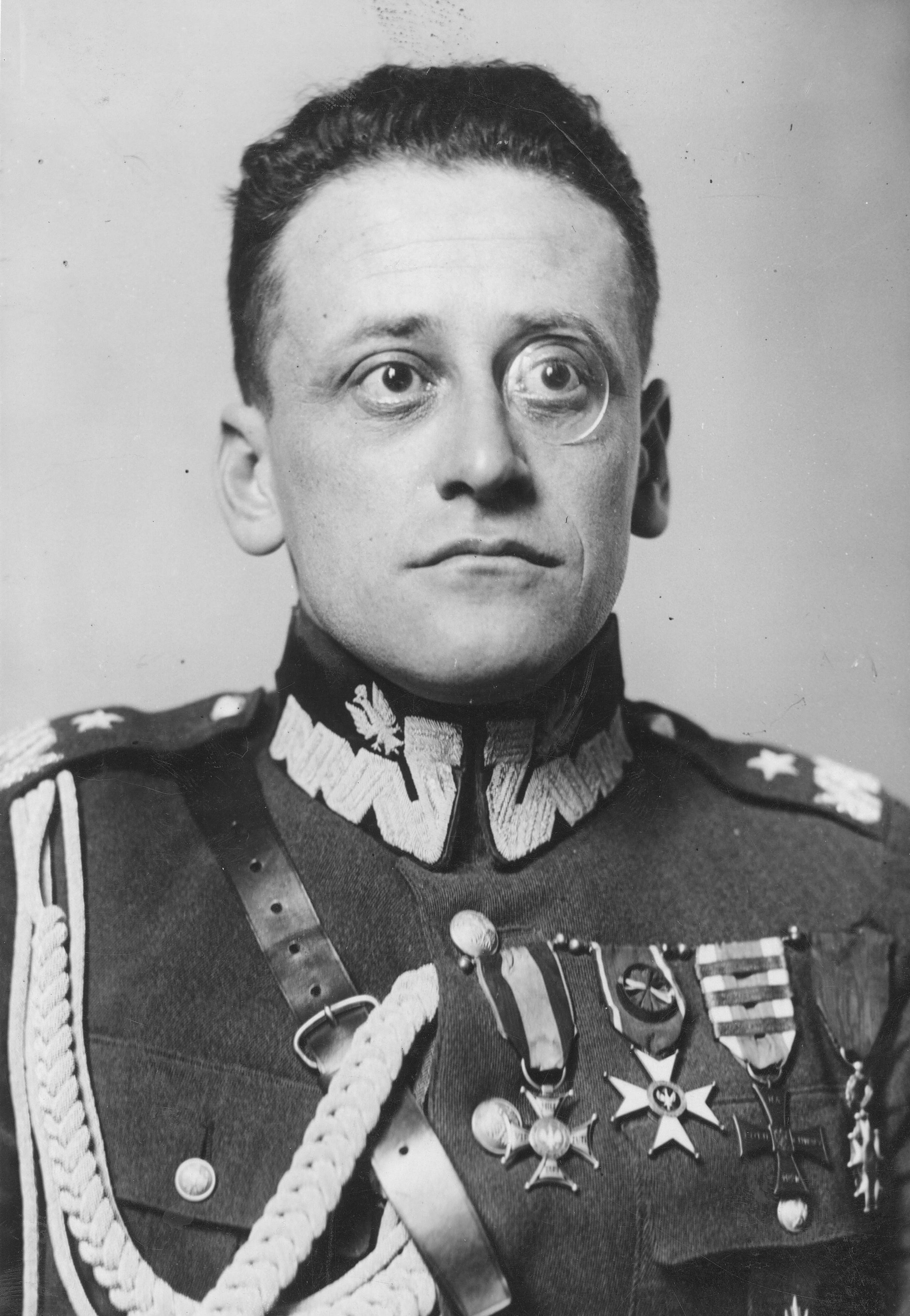
Stanisław Burhardt-Bukacki, before 1930

Major-General Stanisław Burhardt-Bukacki (8 January 1890 – 6 June 1942) was a Polish general.

He served in the Polish Legions in World War I, then took part in the Polish–Ukrainian War and Polish–Soviet War. During World War II, following the German invasion of Poland, he was dispatched to United Kingdom and France, where he arrived around September 7 and where he represented the Polish military in the first weeks of the conflict. He subsequently served in the Polish Armed Forces in the West, where his duties included supervising the evacuation of the Polish Army in France to the United Kingdom following the Fall of France, and later, organization and operation of training camps for Polish Army being recreated in Scotland. He died in Edinburgh in June 1942 aged 52 and was buried at Corstorphine Hill Cemetery, Edinburgh.
