= Polish American Congress =

US national umbrella organization

The Polish American Congress (PAC) is an American umbrella organization of Polish-Americans and Polish-American organizations. Its members include individuals as well as fraternal, educational, veterans, religious, cultural, social, business, and political organizations.

As of January 2009, it lists 20 national organizations as members. It is subdivided into 41 divisions and chapters.

Traditionally, the PAC National President has also been the president of the largest Polish-American fraternal organization, the Polish National Alliance (PNA).

== History ==
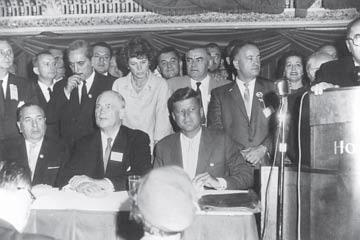
John F. Kennedy attending a PAC Congress in Chicago, 1960.

In response to the threat to Poland's freedom caused by Soviet and German aggression, a large Congress of Polonia met in Buffalo, New York, from May 28 to June 1, 1944. Composed of roughly 2,600 delegates representing Polish and Polish-American organizations, the Congress created the PAC, defining its goal of a free Poland and underscoring its support for the US war effort against the Axis powers. The PAC incorporated the two former Polish umbrella organizations in the United States, the moderate Polish American Council founded in 1939 and the right-wing National Committee of Americans of Polish Descent founded in 1941. The other umbrella organization, the left-leaning American Slav Congress, remained independent.

The PAC was the first umbrella organization representing a majority of Polish-Americans, who had been represented by a wide range of smaller, mostly local organizations. Creation of PAC was enthusiastically welcomed by most of the Polish-American community. Shortly after its creation, it boasted 6 million members and followers.

== Timeline ==
=== Part I: 1944-1980 ===
- May 28-June 1, 1944: The Polish American Congress is founded at a massive rally in Buffalo, New York. Some 2,600 delegates from Polish American communities around the country take part in that significant event of World War II.
- 1945: Following President Franklin Roosevelt's return from the Yalta Conference at Yalta with British Prime Minister Winston Churchill and Soviet Premier Joseph Stalin, Charles Rozmarek, President of the PAC, and the other members are among the first in America who publicly denounce the great power agreements on Poland and Eastern Europe as a betrayal of American reasons for participating in World War II.
- 1946: Rozmarek angrily denounces the handling of thousands of Polish displaced persons throughout Western and Central Europe by UN authorities and calls for immediate changes after observing the conditions in Germany and France. In Paris, Rozmarek calls for free elections in Poland to determine the country’s future.
- 1948: The PAC lobbies successfully for special congressional legislation signed by President Harry Truman that leads to the admission of 140,000 Polish displaced persons, war victims and veterans of the Polish armed forces in Western Europe to settle permanently in the US.
- 1949: The PAC backs the creation of Radio Free Europe as a voice of truth to the peoples of communist-enslaved Eastern Europe.
- 1952: A special committee of the US Congress strongly endorsed by the PAC investigates the murder of more than 14,000 Polish Army officers at the beginning of World War II by the Soviet Union.
- 1957: Following the collapse of the Stalinist regime in Poland in 1956 and its replacement by a new, seemingly-reforming communist regime headed by Wladyslaw Gomulka, the PAC backs a US government foreign aid initiative aimed at weaning Gomulka away from Moscow's authority. Immigration to the US is renewed, enabling thousands of Polish families to be reunited in this country.
- 1960: Eisenhower is the first US President to speak at a meeting of the Polish American Congress when he addresses its fifth convention in Chicago. Senator John Kennedy, the Democratic Party's presidential nominee, also speaks to the assembly. In later years, Presidents Johnson, Nixon, Ford, Carter, Reagan, Bush, and Clinton will all address the Polish American Congress or its leaders on issues pertaining to its concerns.
- 1964: The PAC endorses President Lyndon Johnson's policy of "Building Bridges" to "peacefully engage" the peoples of Eastern Europe and to encourage the democratization and independence of the entire region from Soviet domination.
- 1969: The first formal dialogues between the PAC and leaders of the American Jewish community begin in an effort to create new understanding and communication between two peoples who lived together in Poland for seven centuries until the Nazi occupation, devastation of Poland, and ruthless annihilation of the Jewish people.
- 1975: The PAC endorses President Gerald Ford’s signing of the international treaty on security and cooperation in Europe in Helsinki, Finland. Among other things, the Helsinki Accords legitimize a set of human rights for the people living under communist rule in the Soviet Union and Eastern Europe.
- 1980: The forming of the Solidarity Trade Union Movement in Gdansk in August in a time of extreme economic and political crisis brings an immediate PAC endorsement for the union's cause under the leadership of President Mazewski and Vice President Kazimierz Lukomski, a veteran observer of the Polish scene and a member of the World War II era Polish Combatants' Association. The PAC, working in cooperation with Professor Zbigniew Brzezinski, President Carter's National Security Advisor, urges the United States to pressure the Soviet Union against intervening in the crisis, and calls on the Polish government to negotiate responsibly with Solidarity. The initial confrontation subsides.

=== Part II: 1981- 1994 ===
- 1981: The PAC sponsored efforts begin to raise money and materials to meet the needs of Poles, who suffer in an economy that has nearly collapsed. The PAC Charitable Foundation initiates its work for Poland by delivering medical goods in short supply to Poland. In December, after Poland's military suppresses Solidarity and proclaims martial law, the PAC backs American sanctions against the Soviet Union and Poland.
- 1982: The PAC, in co-operation with Witold Plonski of Brooklyn, wins substantial funding from the US National Endowment for the Humanities for its proposal to create a national "Consortium for Humanities and Arts Programming." Over the next five years, his Polish American Committee in the Humanities sponsors several hundred lectures, conferences, and cultural exhibitions around the US that deal with the Polish and Polish American experience. Thar is the most successful effort in history to enlighten the American public and Polish Americans about Poland's past, culture, and political experience.
- 1984: President Reagan meets with PAC leaders at the White House on the occasion of the 40th anniversary of the Warsaw Uprising. He reaffirms his administration’s support for the policy known as the National Endowment for Democracy and endorses the creation of a Polish agricultural foundation proposed by the Catholic Church.
- 1987: The PAC wins the Reagan administration's termination of economic sanctions against Poland, a position in accord with the thinking of Pope John Paul II and Solidarity leader Lech Walesa.
- 1989: In November, the PAC greets Lech Walesa in Chicago, where he receives a hero’s welcome. The PAC goes on record in lobbying for economic assistance proposals to Poland advanced by President Bush and the US Congress. The first result of these efforts is passage of the Support East European Democracy Act of 1989, which commits more than $800 million to help Poland in its transformation into a democratically governed society with a free market economy.
- 1990: PAC successfully lobbies President Bush for full US support to international confirmation of the permanence of Poland's western border with the reunited Germany, which is crucial to the future stability of Central Europe.
- 1991: The disintegration of the Soviet Union follows upon a failed last-ditch attempt in August by old guard communist leaders to reverse Gorbachev's reforms, but Gorbachev himself is soon swept aside by Russia's elected president, Boris Yeltsin. Poland, the vast Solidarity movement, and the Roman Catholic Church all played major roles in helping bring about those incredible international developments.
- 1992: The PAC plays a leading role in the activities of an historic congress of Poles from more than 50 countries, including from the former Soviet Union, that takes place in Krakow, Poland, under the auspices of the Wspolnota Polska association. The congress is among other things, a great family reunion occurring in a Poland that is at last free and independent. President Lech Walesa, Prime Minister Hanna Suchocka, and Cardinal Jozef Glemp are among the Polish dignitaries who address the congress. An "American Agenda" is unanimously approved by the delegates to the eleventh national PAC convention in Washington in October. Accordingly, the Congress commits itself to giving renewed and vigorous attention to building broad knowledge and respect for Poland's history and culture in this country and the advancement of worthy Polish-American nominees to every level of government responsibility in America. The task before the PAC is to put that agenda into effect.
- 1994: President Moskal, Vice President Wojcik, Treasurer Dykla and a delegation of Polish American Congress leaders play key roles in two meetings of Americans of Polish, Czech, Hungarian, and Slovak heritage that are held with the top leaders of the US government, including President Bill Clinton and Vice President Albert Gore. The meetings held in Milwaukee and Washington, DC, are themselves the direct result of a massive and unprecedented PAC campaign aimed at mobilizing Polish Americans and their friends to pressure the Administration to back NATO membership for Poland, the Czech Republic, Hungary and Slovakia. More than 100,000 letters and postcards and countless thousands of telephone calls and telegrams deluge the White House in an unprecedented display of PAC strength and resolve.

=== Part III: 1995-2019 ===
- 1995: The PAC backs voter registration efforts in the Polish-American community and responds to a tragic fire in Gdansk, Poland, by sending special supplies to the many burn victims.
- 1996: During the presidential campaign, the PAC strongly urges the candidates to support Poland’s entry into NATO and immigration reform and to affirm the US commitment to the Voice of America and Radio Free Europe/Radio Liberty. A major ally is US Representative William Lipinski of Illinois.
- 1997: President Clinton moves forward Poland's admission to NATO. The PAC acts effectively on behalf of Polish flood victims and on immigration reform.
- 1998: The national ancestry question is retained for the 2000 census after PAC efforts.
- 1999: The admission of Poland, Hungary, and the Czech Republic to NATO is approved by all 16 of its members. PAC members take part in the celebrations in Washington. A US Congressional Caucus on Central and Eastern Europe is created through PAC efforts.
- 2000: The PAC effectively fights for justice against the policemen involved in the shakedowns of Polish immigrants in Chicago.
- 2001: The PAC Charitable Foundation raises $125,000 on behalf of the victims of the terrorist attacks in New York and Washington on September 11.
- 2002: The PAC defends thousands of Polish students who are victims of errors in the management of the J-1 visa work/travel program to the US. The PAC is invited by the Speaker of the Polish Senate to participate in the Polonia Advisory Council and also takes a lead role in the Council of World Polonia under National Executive Director Les Kuczynski. The Washington, DC, office introduces an internship in the capital for Polish-American university students.
- 2003: The City of Chicago settles a lawsuit brought by the PAC over the unfair gerrymandering of the city’s Polish-American community.
- 2005: Frank J. Spula becomes president of the PNA and the PAC following the death of President Moskal. He is still president of PAX.
- 2006: The Washington, DC, office begins to offer a number of programs in the capital to present the Polish-American contribution to the country.
- 2007: The PAC inaugurates its Medal of Freedom and honors Casimir Lenard as its first recipient. Senators Barbara Mikulski of Maryland in 2008 and George Voinovich of Ohio in 2009 are recipients of the PAC's highest recognition.
- 2008: The PAC passes an amendment to its by-laws prohibiting collaborators with communist regimes from holding office in the organization. That action reaffirms the PAC's historic position as stated in its by-laws. Annual Polish American Congress Days begin to be held in Washington, DC, and state capitals across the country. President Spula travels to Poland to reaffirm the PAC's close ties with the Polish government.
- 2009: PAC remains active in working closely with the US administration and legislators on several legislative initiatives to include resolutions celebrating 90 years of diplomatic relations, commemorating 20 years since the round table talks and first free elections in Poland, urging the Postal Services to issue a stamp honoring Matt Urban, recognizing 6,135 Poles recognized by Yad Vashem as “Righteous Among the Nations” for helping their Jewish neighbors during World War II; recognizing 70th anniversary of the beginning of World War II as well as Soviet invasion of Poland; proclaiming Casimir Pulaski to be a posthumous honorary US citizen, to name a few. The PAC holds in Chicago its first National Conference, "The Polish American Community in the 21st Century: Challenges and Opportunities," which is designed to bring together representatives of the Polish-American community nationwide and to initiate a discussion about its future.
- 2014: An electronic newsletter, Your Voice in America starts to be published.
- 2016: The PAC held its first-ever national meeting outside the US in Rzeszów, Poland, attending the prestigious “2016 Forum Polonii Amerykańskiej” (Forum of American Polonia) held July 25–30, in Rzeszów, Podkarpacie Region. The meeting helped Polish-Americans who traveled to Poland the opportunity to hear firsthand all that Poland is doing to continue its efforts to be a strong business and tourist center in Europe.
- 2017PAC develops a robust internship program giving Polish-American students an opportunity to advance their knowledge about issues on Polonia, Poland, and Central and Eastern Europe, helping to advocate for the interests of Polish Americans on Capitol Hill, and honing their professional skills related to policy and communications work among other field internship. It attracts undergraduate, graduate, and doctoral students from all across the United States and is popular among Polish Americans studying in Poland;
- 2018
  - PAC launches new website at the old domain www.PAC1944.org, and additional social media pages, such as Instagram and LinkedIn; the PAC National Office began implementing new digital communication strategies.
  - PAC leads in organizing a coalition of groups opposed to moving Andrzej Pitynski's Katyń Monument from Exchange Place in Jersey City. The National PAC Office continues to work together with this coalition to make Exchange Place a public pedestrian pathway, FREEDOM PLAZA NORTH, to prevent further efforts by real estate development companies to try to move the Katyn Monument.
  - PAC is a major partner with the United States sponsored World War I Centennial Commission.
  - Press releases are routinely sent to media outlets to inform American and Polish Americans of matters of importance to the Polish American community (i.e. in 2018, to help celebrate and commemorate the 100th anniversary of Poland regaining its independence, releases were prepared to inform media outlets and their subscribers as to the importance of November 11, 1918 in Poland's history).
- 2019
  - PAC National Office persuades the other member organizations of the Central and East European Coalition to organize in congressional district visits by CEEC delegations of constituents to show members of Congress that the CEEC is not just an inside the Beltway talking shop but has political power and the votes of numerous constituents in the country.
  - PAC National Office builds a more effective and efficient communication effort with staffers on the Capitol Hill on both parties for advocacy purposes.

== Leadership ==
The Congress elected Karol Rozmarek as the first president of the PAC. He was succeeded in 1968 by Aloysius Mazewski, who served until his death in 1988. Under Mazewski, Leonard F. Walentynowicz served as executive director of the PAC for a number of years. Edward Moskal was elected president in 1988, and he, too, served as president for the remainder of his life. Its current president is Frank J. Spula.

== Activities ==
PAC has been credited with the unification of the Polish-American community.

=== International relations lobbying ===
One of the principal goals of PAC in its early years was to pressure the US government to support the Polish government in exile, and prevent the communist take-over of Poland. Over the coming decades, PAC would try to educate the American public about the fate of its once war-time ally, and to support a creation of a democratic Polish state. Its stance during that time has also been described as strongly anti-communist and anti-Soviet.

After the end of the Cold War, PAC was successful in lobbying the US government to include Poland in the membership of NATO.

=== Criticism of anti-Polish racism and bigotry ===
Outside of its goals related to international politics, PAC second main goal has been to improve the situation of the Polish-American community.

According to Michael Szporer PAC had a reputation of aggressiveness in its critique of anti-Polish sentiment.

In 1969 PAC created the Civic Alertness Commission (Komisji Obrony Imienia Polskiego) to focus on reducing the anti-Polish sentiment and related anti-Polish discrimination in American media and public life. Over the years, the CAC would change its name several times, including to Anti-Defamation Commission (1970) and Anti-Bigotry Committee (1980); at some point in time (around 1989) two similar sub organizations existed at the same time. The organization focused on pointing out racism and bigotry in Polish jokes, and related stereotypes. The Committee supported the US government plan to create the Equal Employment Opportunity Commission, and policies that made it illegal to tell ethnic jokes in workplaces.

In 1972, PAC demanded equal time to respond to Polish jokes aired on ABC's The Dick Cavett Show. In the show, comedian Bob Einstein filled the role of the president of the imaginary Polish Anti-Defamation League. ABC had guest host Steve Allen apologize but refused equal time to PAC. PAC sued and lost in a case that reached the Supreme Court. PAC also threatened Steve Wozniak, himself of Polish heritage, with a lawsuit for telling Polish jokes.

In 1997 Frank Milewski of PAC's Anti-Bigotry Committee wrote a letter to The New York Times complaining about the use of "Polack" in an article on light-bulb jokes by Daniel Harris.

In 1998, PAC criticized the Polish Wedding film, writing that "No wedding takes place. It's nothing but a contrived series of silly sexual escapades by a cheating wife and her promiscuous daughter shown as members of a crude and low-class family that Fox Films decided to give a Polish Catholic identity". PAC has also criticized The Drew Carey Show, in particular the character Mimi Bobeck whose "Polishness" was toned down following the complaints.

== See also ==
- Canadian Polish Congress, similar organization in Canada
