= Edward Moskal =

Edward Moskal (May 21, 1924 – March 22, 2005) was a longtime president of the Polish National Alliance (PNA) and the Polish American Congress (PAC).

== Biography ==
Moskal was born to a Polish immigrant couple who owned restaurant and catering businesses. Chicago's St. John Cantius School, which focused on the children of Polish Catholic immigrants, provided his education. He became an insurance broker and completed a three-year tour in the U.S. Army before joining the PNA in 1942.

Moskal was elected president of both Polish National Alliance (PNA) and Polish American Congress (PAC) in 1988, and left the position of treasurer.

His 60-plus-year career with PNA led him to a private meeting with Pope John Paul II, several humanitarian-related trips to Poland, and an appointment by United States President Bill Clinton to accompany Vice President Al Gore at the Warsaw Ghetto Uprising anniversary ceremonies in Warsaw.

Poland's President Lech Wałęsa awarded him the second highest civilian honor of the Republic of Poland, the Commander's Cross with Star of Order of Merit of the Republic of Poland. He was also made an honorary citizen of the city of Kraków, Poland. The title of Honorary Doctor was bestowed upon him by the University of Poznań Medical School in 1997.

Edward Moskal died on March 22, 2005, aged 80, in Chicago. He suffered from diabetes, and succumbed to complications after a long period of illness. Over the 2 day Wake and Mass, the Church of St. John Cantius, where he was a lifetime member, reported that over 3000 people paid their respects.

== Controversial actions and positions ==
=== Ideological concerns ===
Some PAC activists became ideologically worried about Moskal. One of those concerned was Kazimierz Lukomski, vice president and head of the Commission for Polish Affairs, for years the "soul" of all major initiatives involving Poland. Moskal began to push Lukomski aside and undertake decisions without consulting the Commission for Polish Affairs, even neglecting to notify it of his decisions.

=== Accusations of Communist sympathies ===
In a letter to Jan Krawiec dated May 28, 1991, Lukomski rationalizing his decision to resign as Vice president of PAC and the Commission for Polish Affairs wrote: "Moskal treats the PAC just as he does the Polish National Alliance as his private fiefdom. I refuse to accept that and at the same time I do not have any means of opposing his misdeeds. Apart from few very narrow instances; I am shoved aside here in Chicago. Moskal is able to pull to his side everyone, along with our independents, who no longer care that he supports diplomats of the communist regime like Czerwinski, or sings songs of praise to General Wojciech Jaruzelski."

=== Accusations of antisemitic views ===
At the beginning of 1996 Moskal wrote a letter to then Polish president Aleksander Kwaśniewski, Moskal was critical of Jewish influence, criticizing Poland's alleged vassalage with regard to Jews. He supported his argument by referring to the act of the Sejm (the lower house of the Polish parliament) whose goal was to return Jewish property swiftly. Similar acts became law in Romania, Hungary, and Austria, and were considered by the Czech Republic. In a letter Moskal added a reference to "the murder by Israel of innocent women and children who were sheltered in UN camps in Lebanon."

Moskal was well received by the Polish far-right. Moskal transformed the PAC from its Polish-oriented lobbying active mostly in Washington to greater activity in Warsaw. His criticisms of Israel and the Jewish lobbying groups internationally became a focus of attention. The American Jewish Congress (AJC), called Moskal an antisemite.

In a letter to Prime Minister Buzek he criticized the nomination of Wladyslaw Bartoszewski as a member of the Remembrance Committee. (Bartoszewski was an inmate in Auschwitz). The letter ended: "It brings me comfort to think that, with God's help, you shall be prime minister only until the spring."

Under the headline: "Another Trojan horse of Jewish organizations", Moskal reflected: "Who employs Kieres. Aren't these the lackeys who, feeling strange guilt, yield to Jewish demands." In the same statement he advises Jews: "It would be better if they treated Palestinians properly without killing their children. Terrible is the image of a young Palestinian protected by his own father against Israeli gunfire, moments later dead from the bullets of these 'heroes'."

The American Jewish Committee severed its longtime ties with the PAC in 1996 after Moskal wrote a letter to Polish President Aleksander Kwaśniewski, criticizing him and other Polish leaders for being too conciliatory toward Jews.

He made headlines a few years later when he speculated that Polish war hero Jan Nowak-Jeziorański was a Nazi collaborator.

In 2002, when Rahm Emanuel pursued the U.S. House seat in the 5th District of Illinois to replace Rod Blagojevich who successfully ran for governor, Moskal supported former Illinois State Representative Nancy Kaszak. Moskal called Emanuel a "millionaire carpetbagger who knows nothing" about "our heritage". Moskal also charged that Emanuel had dual citizenship with Israel and had served in the Israeli Army. Moskal's comments were widely condemned as antisemitic.

=== Other actions ===
He took former Illinois Governor Jim Edgar to task at a Pulaski (Kazimierz Pułaski) Day event in 1996, demanding the ouster of then state Education Superintendent Joseph A. Spagnolo for failing to order Illinois schools to teach about Pulaski, a Revolutionary War hero who was born in Poland.

When the late syndicated columnist Ann Landers used a racially derogatory term to describe Pope John Paul II in The New Yorker, Moskal quipped, "She should have shut up after she made the nice remark about the pope."
