= Praga-Południe =

Coordinates: 52.241729°N 21.083867°E

Praga-South
- Warsaw District
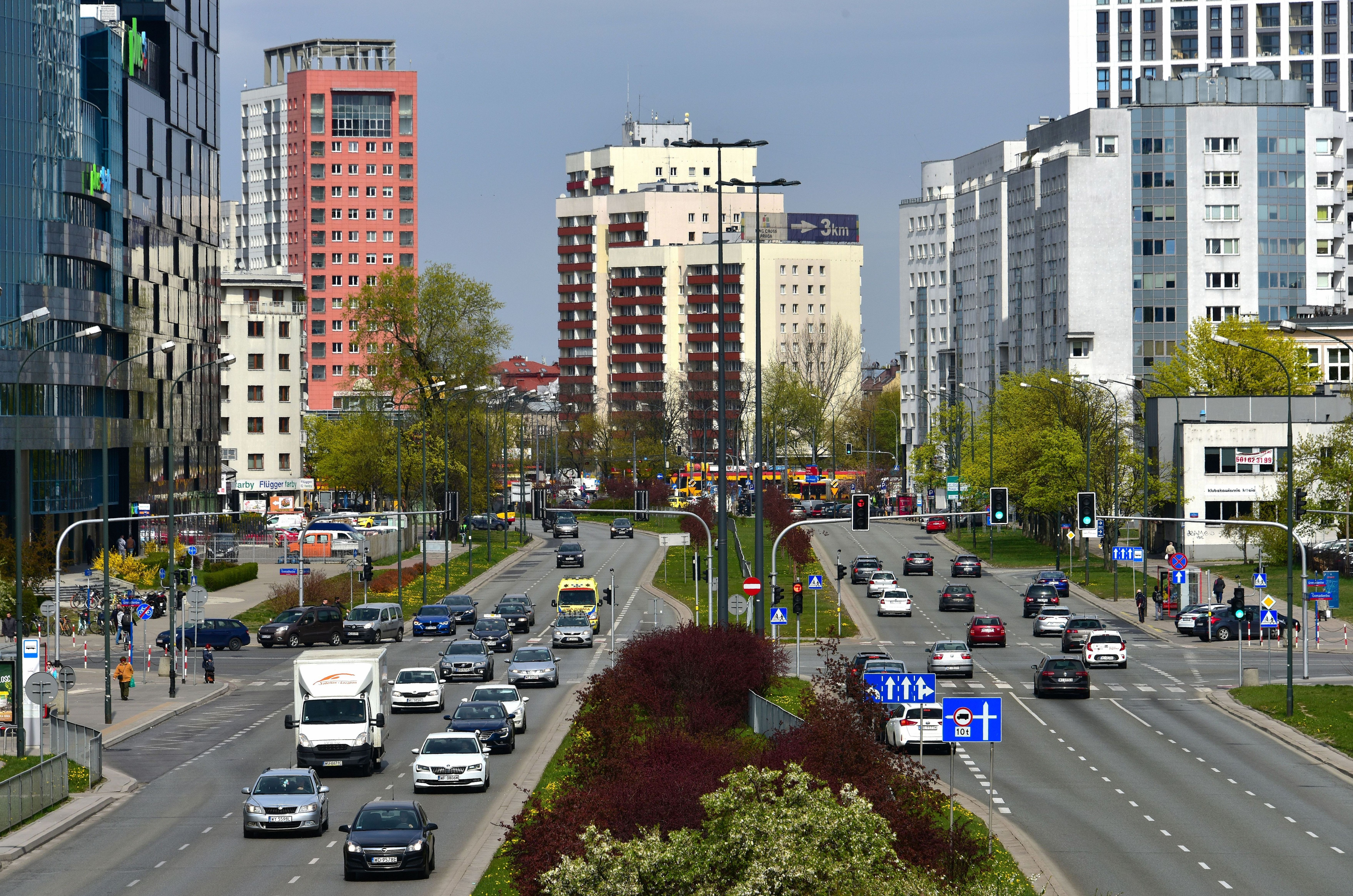
- Stanów Zjednoczonych Avenue

- Location of Praga-South within Warsaw
- Country: Poland
- Voivodeship: Masovian
- County/City: Warsaw
- District: Praga
- Notable landmarks: Saska Kępa architecture, Skaryszew Park, National Stadium, Neon Museum

Government
  - Mayor: Tomasz Kucharski

Area
  - Total: 22.38 km^{2} (8.64 sq mi)

Population (2019)
  - Total: 179,836
  - Density: 8,036/km^{2} (20,810/sq mi)
- Time zone: UTC+1 (CET)
  - Summer (DST): UTC+2 (CEST)
- Area code: +48 22
- Website: pragapld.um.warszawa.pl

Praga-Południe (Polish pronunciation: [ˈpraɡa pɔˈwudɲɛ]), also known by its anglicized names Praga-South, Praga South, and South Praga, is a district of the city of Warsaw, Poland located on the east bank of the Vistula River. It consists of Grochów, Gocław, Kamionek and Saska Kępa.

== History ==
The area of today's Praga-South has been inhabited since at least the 7th century. There are traces of settlements established earlier than Warsaw itself. However, the swampy and often flooded terrain was deserted as soon as Warsaw was founded. Since the 16th century it was again populated, but due to lack of communication with Warsaw (until the 19th century there were no permanent bridges across the Vistula at Warsaw) it was an unimportant suburb.

It shared the fate of a greater area named Praga, which was the easternmost suburb of Warsaw. In the 17th century one of the areas of present Praga-South was turned into a military camp. In the 18th century part of the area was named Saska Kępa (literally Saxon Rise) after the Saxon Guards of the Kings of Poland stationed there.

Until the early 20th century the area retained its rural character. The area officially became a part of Warsaw in 1916. It soon became one of fastest-growing areas of Warsaw and Saska Kępa became its centre. In the 1920s and 1930s it became one of the most popular villa areas of the Warsaw's middle class.

During and after World War II the district was not destroyed. Despite several plans, it was not industrialised either, which allowed the district to retain much of its original quiet and peaceful character. Currently there are several new areas with luxurious blocks of flats in the area, but the authorities do not plan to construct more houses and want the character to be preserved.

Apart from the Saska Kępa architecture, the main attractions of the borough are the Kazimierz Górski National Stadium, Skaryszew Park, Kamionek Lake and the Olszynka Grochowska reserve. The battlefield of the Battle of Olszynka Grochowska (1831) and the 2B Jerzego Waszyngtona Avenue Skyscraper is also located within the district.

== Neighbourhoods within the district ==
- Kamionek
- Saska Kepa
- Gocław
- Gocławek^{a}
- Grochów
- Olszynka Grochowska

^aincludes the smaller, unofficial neighbourhood Witolin, whose name continues to exist as the Public Transport Authority's bus terminus "Witolin"
