= Katowicka Street =

Street in Warsaw

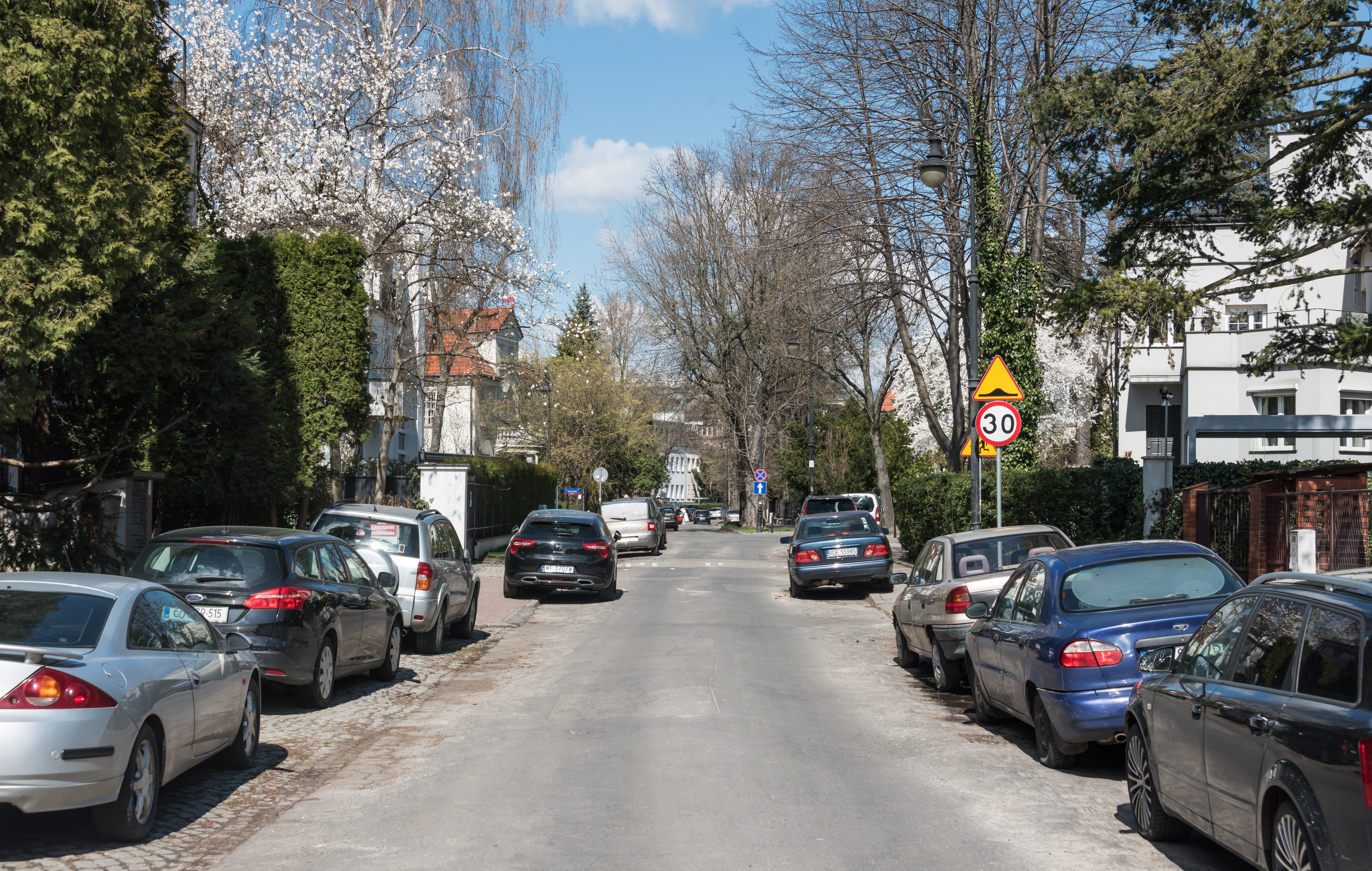
- Katowicka Street on the section between Zwycięzców and Obrońców streets
- Interactive map of Katowicka Street
- Part of: Saska Kępa
- Location: Warsaw
- Coordinates: 52°13′58.0″N 21°03′06.0″E

Katowicka Street is a street in Warsaw located in Saska Kępa, running from the intersection with Zwycięzców Street to the intersection with Obrońców Street. The name of the street refers to Katowice, the capital of the then youngest Silesian Voivodeship. This fits into the nomenclature of many other streets in Saska Kępa, referring to the new political order after World War I. It is mainly lined with residential buildings, including those from the interwar period, 13 of which are listed in the heritage register. Several buildings were designed by architects associated with the Praesens group. Katowicka Street also bears traces of an urban experiment from the late 1940s.

== Mileage and traffic ==
Katowicka Street runs parallel to the Vistula river. It is located in the northwestern part of Saska Kępa, between Wał Miedzeszyński and Francuska streets. It begins at the intersection with Zwycięzców Street, then intersects with Obrońców Street, and ends by intersecting with Walecznych Street. The street is one-way, allowing traffic only in the northward direction. There are no public transportation routes or bike lanes running through it.

== History ==
The history of Katowicka Street dates back to the 1920s when the land in Saska Kępa was drained and divided into plots. The completion of the Poniatowski Bridge also spurred residential development in the area. The name of the street was officially given by the Warsaw City Council on 27 September 1926. The oldest part of the architecture, known as Kolonia Łaskiego, dates back to 1926. From 1928, single-family houses, including those inspired by the latest global architectural trends influenced by designers such as Le Corbusier, began to appear on the street.

After World War II, the villas on Katowicka Street were converted into multi-room apartments, forcibly accommodating tenants in the pre-war owners' residences. Moreover, a section of the street between Zwycięzców and Obrońców (approximately 250 meters) was selected for reconstruction by the Capital Reconstruction Office. The experiment aimed to transform it into a showcase street ("Street of Warsaw's Future") by removing fences, introducing greenery, and decorating it with street furniture. According to press reports, the initiative was well received by residents. The team of architects responsible for the reconstruction, led by Bohdan Lachert, also collaborated with a group of sculptors, mainly residents of Saska Kępa, who worked on their projects voluntarily under the direction of Professor Tadeusz Breyer. The best-preserved decoration from that period is the bas-relief Plon from 1947, which was restored in 2011. Other remnants of the post-war reconstruction of the street include remnants of benches, the external decoration of the staircase in house number 8A, and a few surviving house marks from the Capital Reconstruction Office (plates marking buildings rebuilt with the help of Capital Reconstruction Office). The former layout of the square in front of Plon became an inspiration for one of the projects submitted in 2014 to the participatory budget.

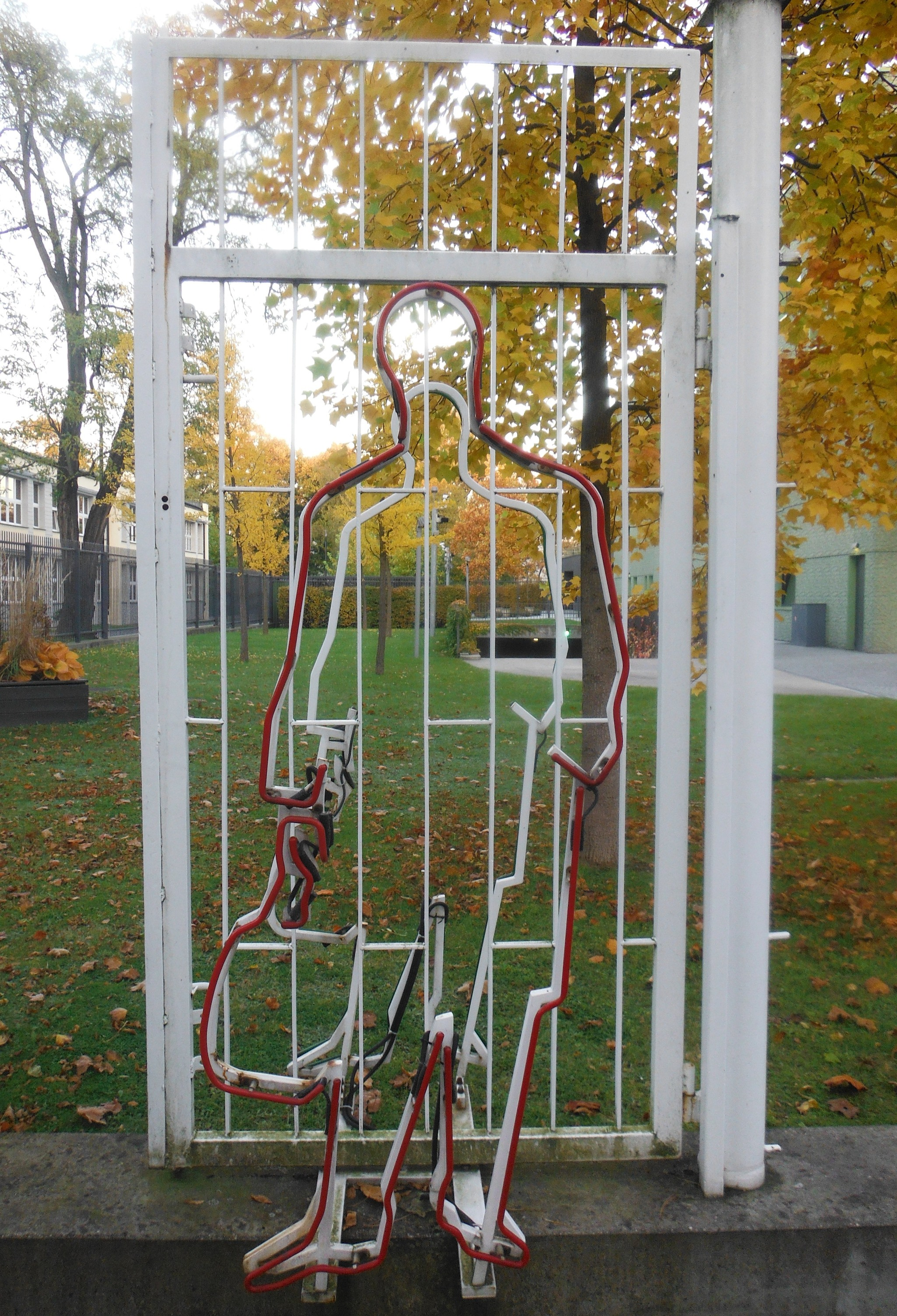
Through Warsaw to Freedom – an installation on the grounds of the German embassy with a fragment of the former fence from Katowicka Street

Katowicka Street was also home to the Embassy of the Federal Republic of Germany, through which around 6,000 citizens of the East Germany attempted to escape to the West in the summer and autumn of 1989. These events were commemorated in 2010 with a monument titled Through Warsaw to Freedom (Polish: Przez Warszawę ku Wolności).

The architecture and history of the street are utilized and showcased by public institutions and private companies, including during the organization of urban games.

== Facilities ==
Most of the buildings on Katowicka Street are residential houses. An exception is the building of School Complex No. 77, located at the corner of Katowicka and Zwycięzców Streets. The design of the building was created before the onset of socialist realism in Poland (1949) and is the work of Barbara and Hieronim Karpowicz. The facade is covered with characteristic brick decoration (1953–1954). On the wall facing Katowicka Street, there is a bas-relief depicting the Mermaid of Warsaw, created by Wojciech Czerwosz.

=== Residential houses ===
- House at 2 Katowicka Street – a villa of the Avenarius family from 1937, designed by Stanisław Barylski.
- House at 4 Katowicka Street – until 1964, (Note: Date of moving the Blood Donation Station to a new building on Alfred Nobel Street.) it was the headquarters of the Blood Donation Station.
- House at 5 Katowicka Street – a rowhouse from 1937, designed by Stanisław Barylski.
- House at 7 Katowicka Street – a house from around 1930, which housed the headquarters of the Capital Reconstruction Office. The building is listed as a historic monument.
- House at 7A Katowicka Street – a house belonging to the Avenarius family from 1930, originally designed by Stanisław Barylski, but redesigned by Bohdan Lachert and Józef Szanajca in 1938. During the renovation, a glass staircase was added, which is the first example of using béton brut motif in Poland. The tower wall (bearing traces of WWII bombardment) is topped with a perforated roof. Notable residents included Lech Niemojewski. An illustration of the house at 7A Katowicka Street was featured on the cover of the book Saska Kępa by Hanna Faryna-Paszkiewicz. The building is listed as a historic monument.
7A Katowicka Street

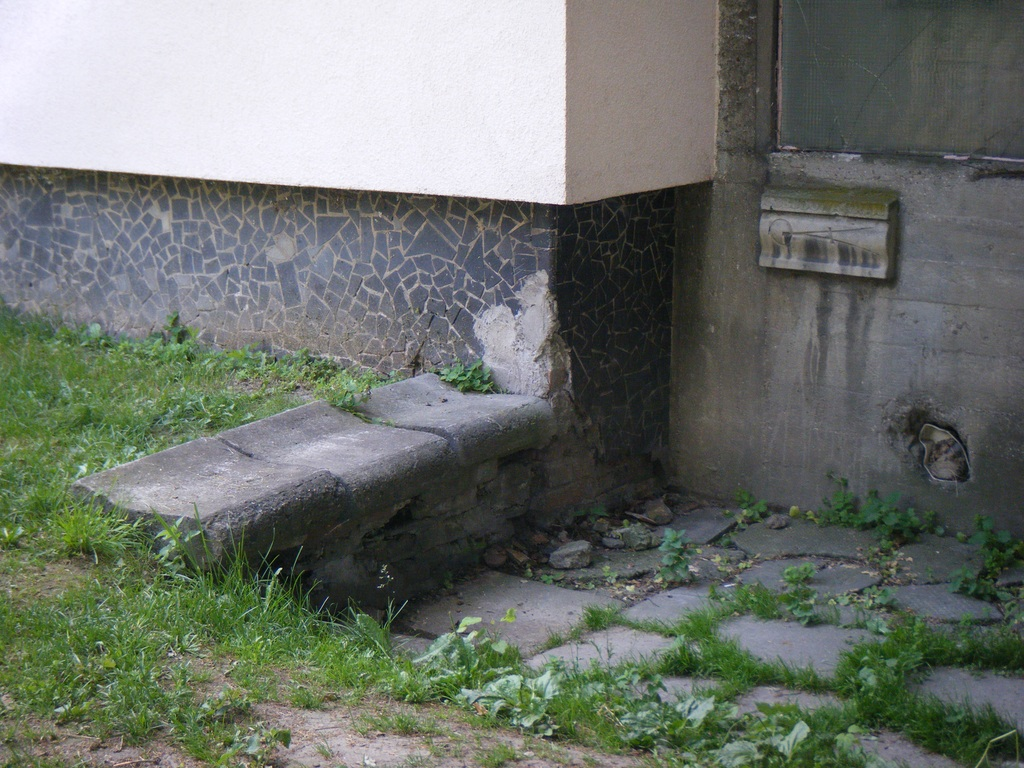
The preserved remnants of benches and plaques from the Capital Reconstruction Office, which marked buildings rebuilt with the assistance of the Capital Reconstruction Office.

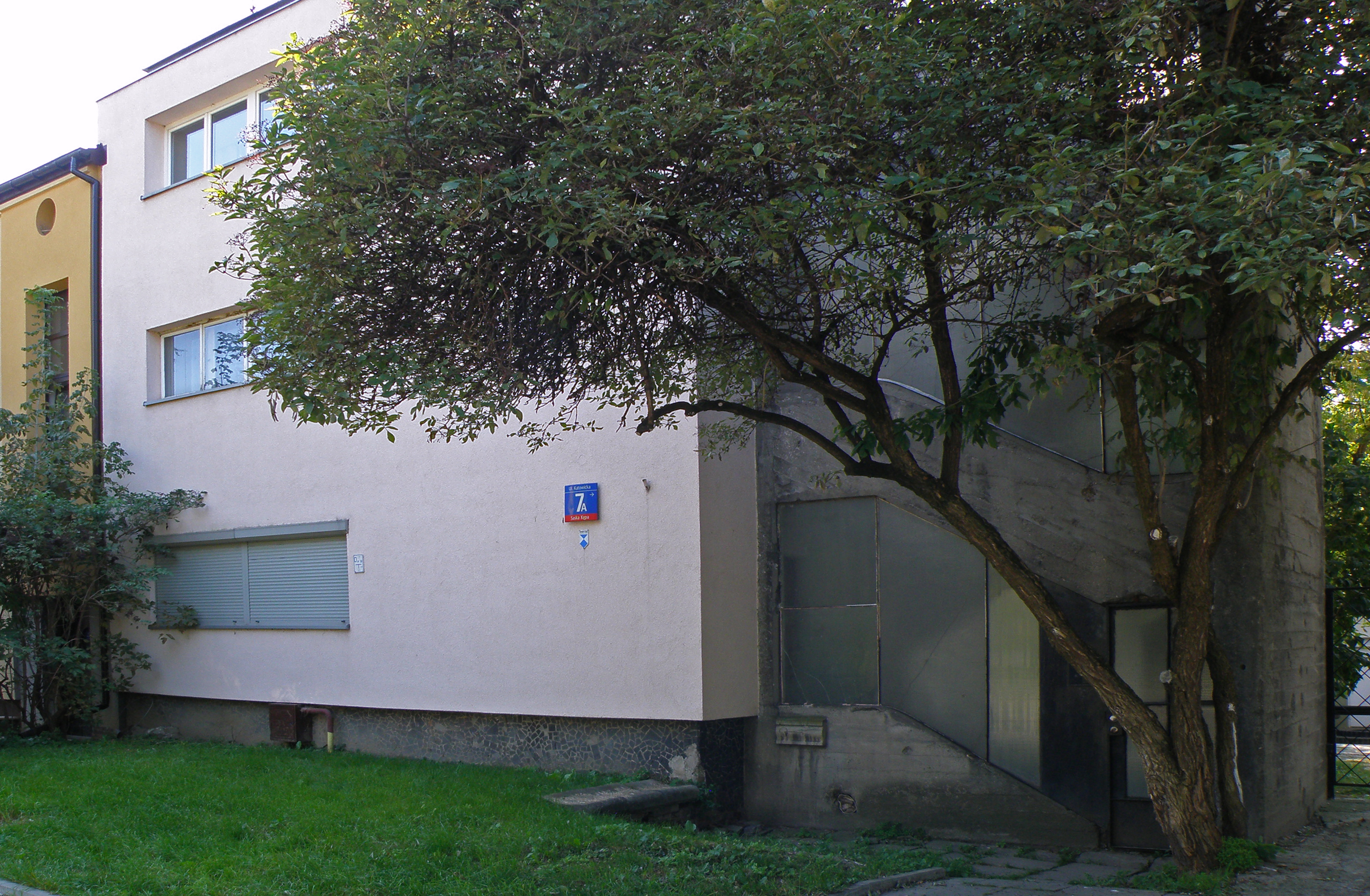
Building from around 1930
- House segment at 8 Katowicka Street – a house from around 1930, listed as a historic monument.
- House segment at 8A Katowicka Street – Toeplitz tenement house – from around 1930, designed by Henryk Oderfeld. The facade retains details from the period of reconstruction by the Capital Reconstruction Office – an openwork made by Jerzy Jarnuszkiewicz. The building is listed as a historic monument.
8A Katowicka Street

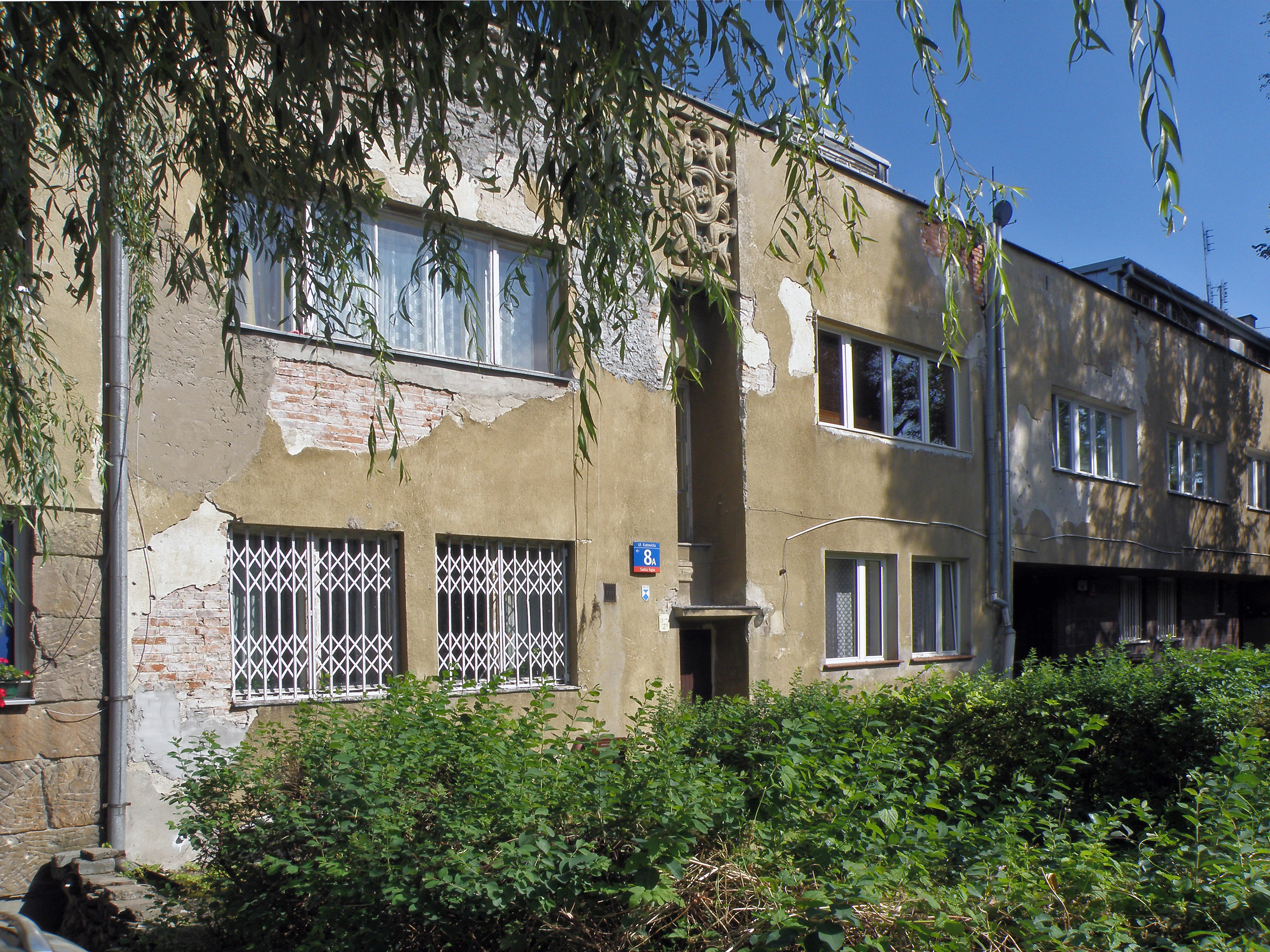
Openwork facade decoration (2011)

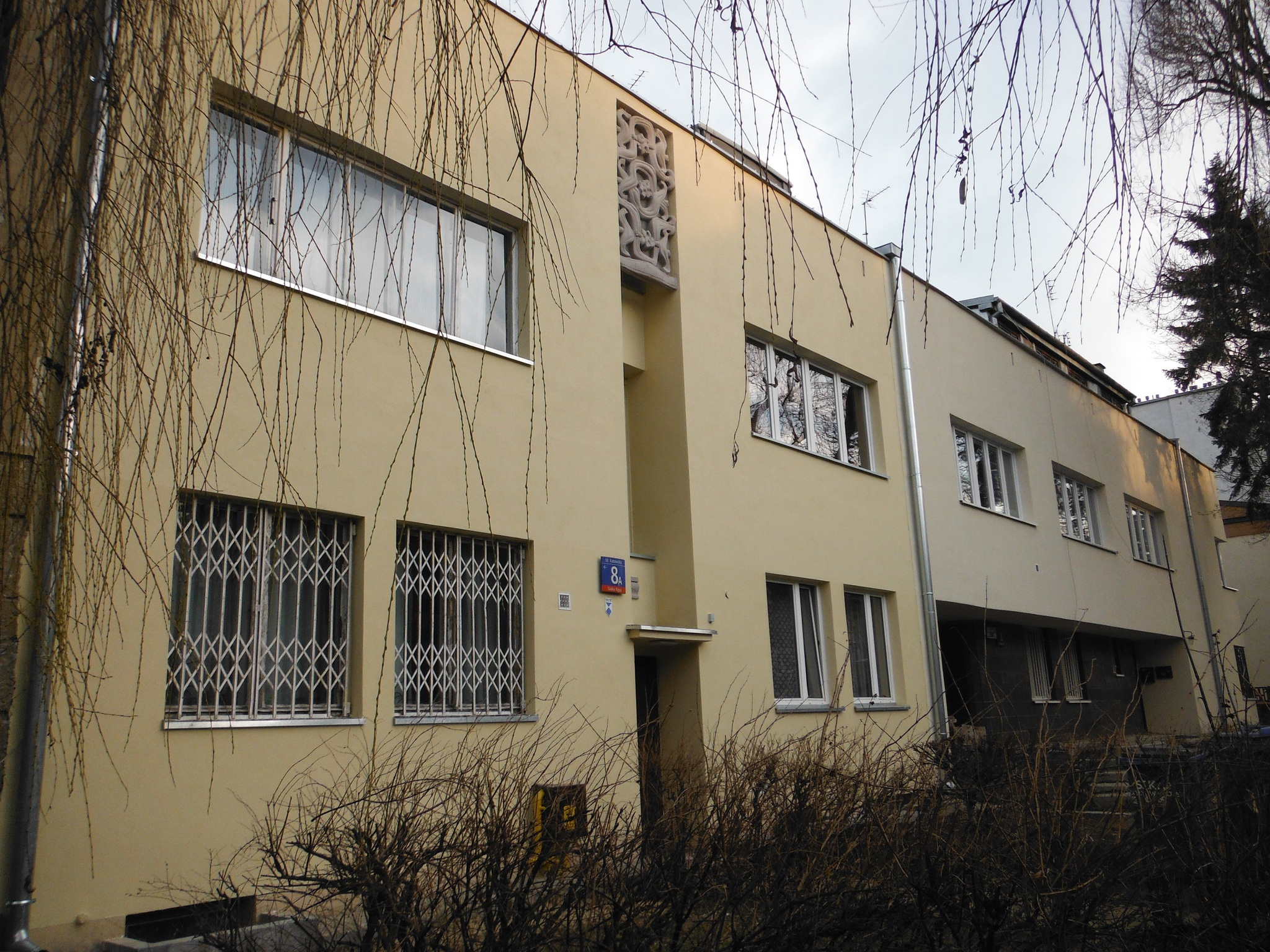
Openwork facade decoration (2013)

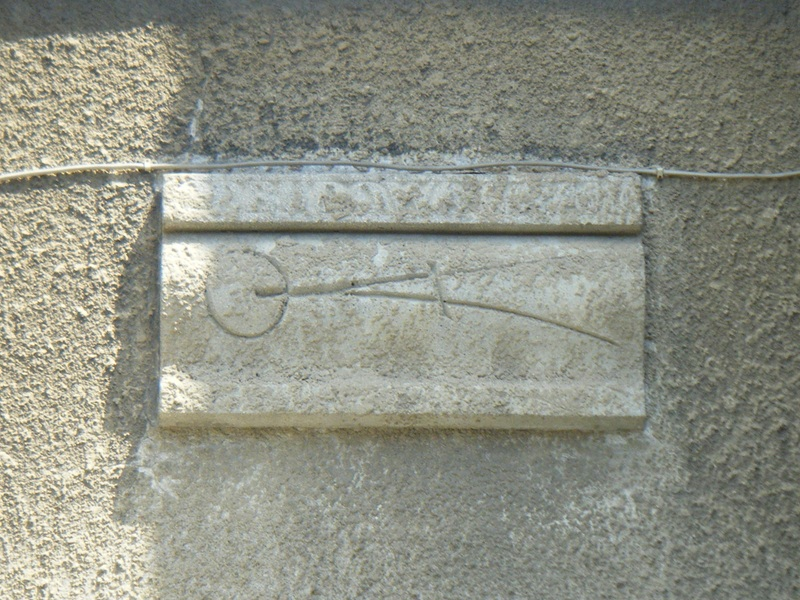
House mark of the Capital Reconstruction Office (2011)

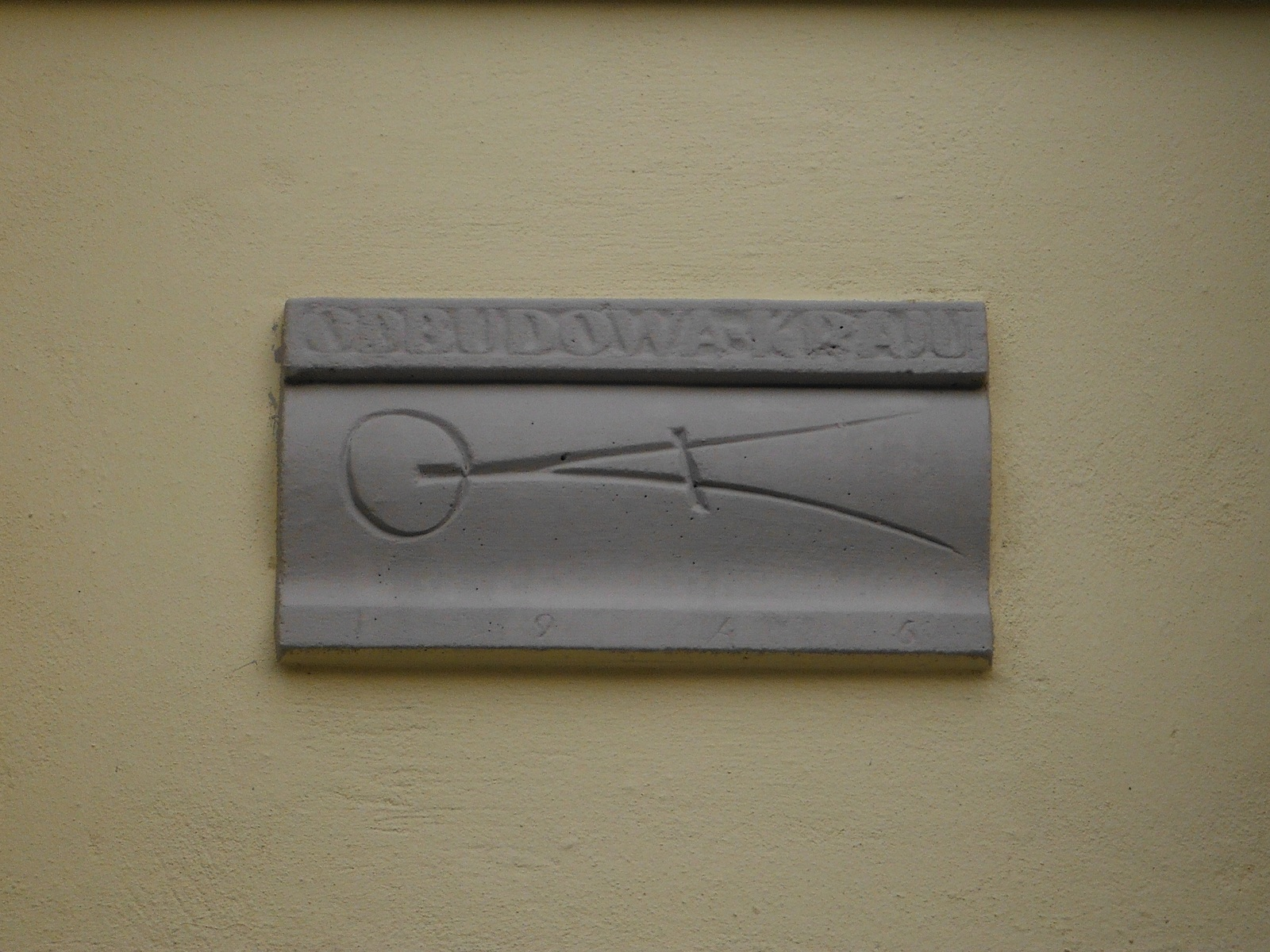
House mark of the Capital Reconstruction Office (2013)
- House segment at 8B Katowicka Street – a house from around 1938 designed by Roman Sołtyński for himself. The building is listed as a historic monument.
- Villa at 9/11/11A Katowicka Street – a triplex designed by Bohdan Lachert and Józef Szanajca from 1928 to 1929. The villa is one of the first examples in Poland to apply Le Corbusier's five principles of modern architecture. The skeletal structure allowed for flexible interior and facade design. The partially open ground floor was supported by columns. Narrow strip windows were used on the street side, while the rear was glazed, connecting the interior with the garden. Part of the building at number 9 was inhabited by Bohdan Lachert himself, and currently serves as the seat of the Dom Holenderski Foundation. The building is listed as a historic monument.
- House at 10 Katowicka Street – a villa designed by Marian Lalewicz from the 1930s. The building lacks historical details, but is distinguished by a glazed, semi-circular living room, with the facade divided by vertical elements. The building is listed as a historic monument.
- House at 16 Katowicka Street – a house from the 1920s–1930s, listed as a historic monument.
- Single-family houses from 17 to 23 Katowicka Street – part of the Łaski Colony (Note: From the name of Jan Łaski, the owner of the area.) from 1926, designed by Włodzimierz Gall. (Note: The rest of Łaski Colony includes houses on Obrońców Street (5–23) and Dąbrowiecka Street (18–28).) These are rowhouses with common load-bearing walls, forming a cohesive row. On the facade of each is a pediment. Each house has a small porch and gardens. Balconies with wrought iron railings were added to the side facades of corner houses. According to one version, building materials from the dismantled Alexander Nevsky Cathedral were used for construction. The project was reported in Kurier Warszawski in 1930: The entire Łaski Colony looks beautiful and picturesque, especially Obrońców Street, opening up a straight perspective towards Wawer, illuminated by arc lamps, creating a positive impression and providing a foretaste of a future villa district, similar to Poznań's Sołacz.
  - House at 17 Katowicka Street – a house from around 1930, listed as a historic monument.
  - House segment at 19 Katowicka Street – a house from around 1930, listed as a historic monument.
  - House segment at 21 Katowicka Street – a house from around 1930, listed as a historic monument.
  - House segment at 23 Katowicka Street – a house from around 1930, listed as a historic monument.
- Villa at 26 Katowicka Street – a villa designed by Szymon Syrkus and Helena Syrkus from around 1936 for the Kiltynowicz family. A distinctive feature of the house is the side facade (disturbed by a later-built garage) and the concrete staircase detail from Katowicka Street. Also visible is the typical element of the architectural projects of the Syrkus couple – clinker brick on the plinth with a wide horizontal joint and narrow vertical one. The building is listed as a historic monument.
- House at 31 Katowicka Street.
- Villa at 10 Obrońców Street (corner of Katowicka) – villa of the Brzeziński family, designed by Piotr Kwieka from the period after 1935. It is considered one of the most extravagant villas in Saska Kępa. Its characteristic elements include a rooftop terrace (with a canopy with a round opening), portholes, thin columns, and undulating facade lines.
- Villa at 25 Obrońców Street (corner of Katowicka) – villa of Felicja Trębicka, designed by Stanisław Nowicki, completed in 1934. It is an example of Art Deco style with elements (e.g., a tower) referring to defensive architecture. Currently, the building serves as office space. During the Warsaw Uprising, it housed a field hospital.
Zwycięzców 11/ Corner of Katowicka

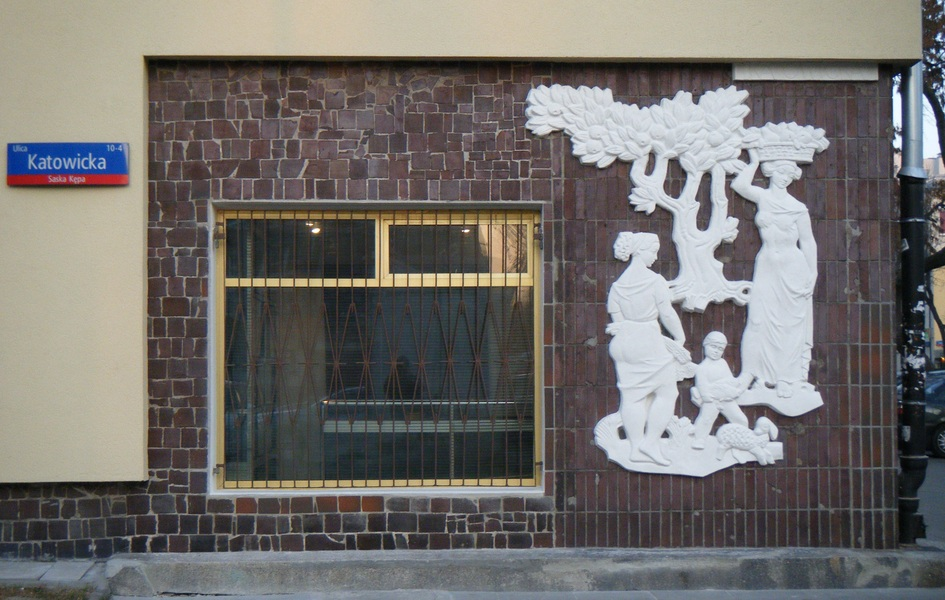
Plon restored in 2011 by Jerzy Jarnuszkiewicz

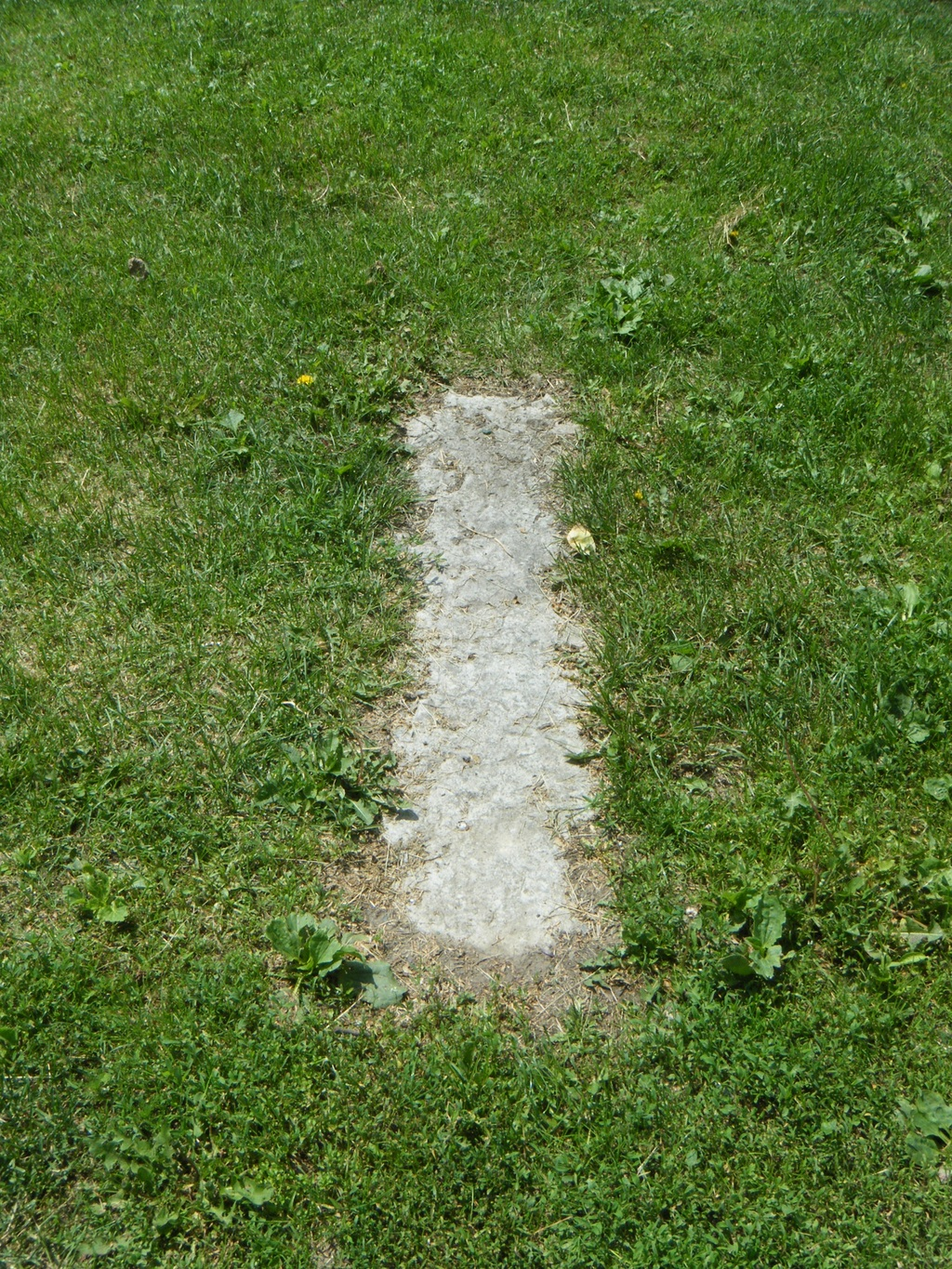
One of the traces of the concrete bench standing in front of Plon
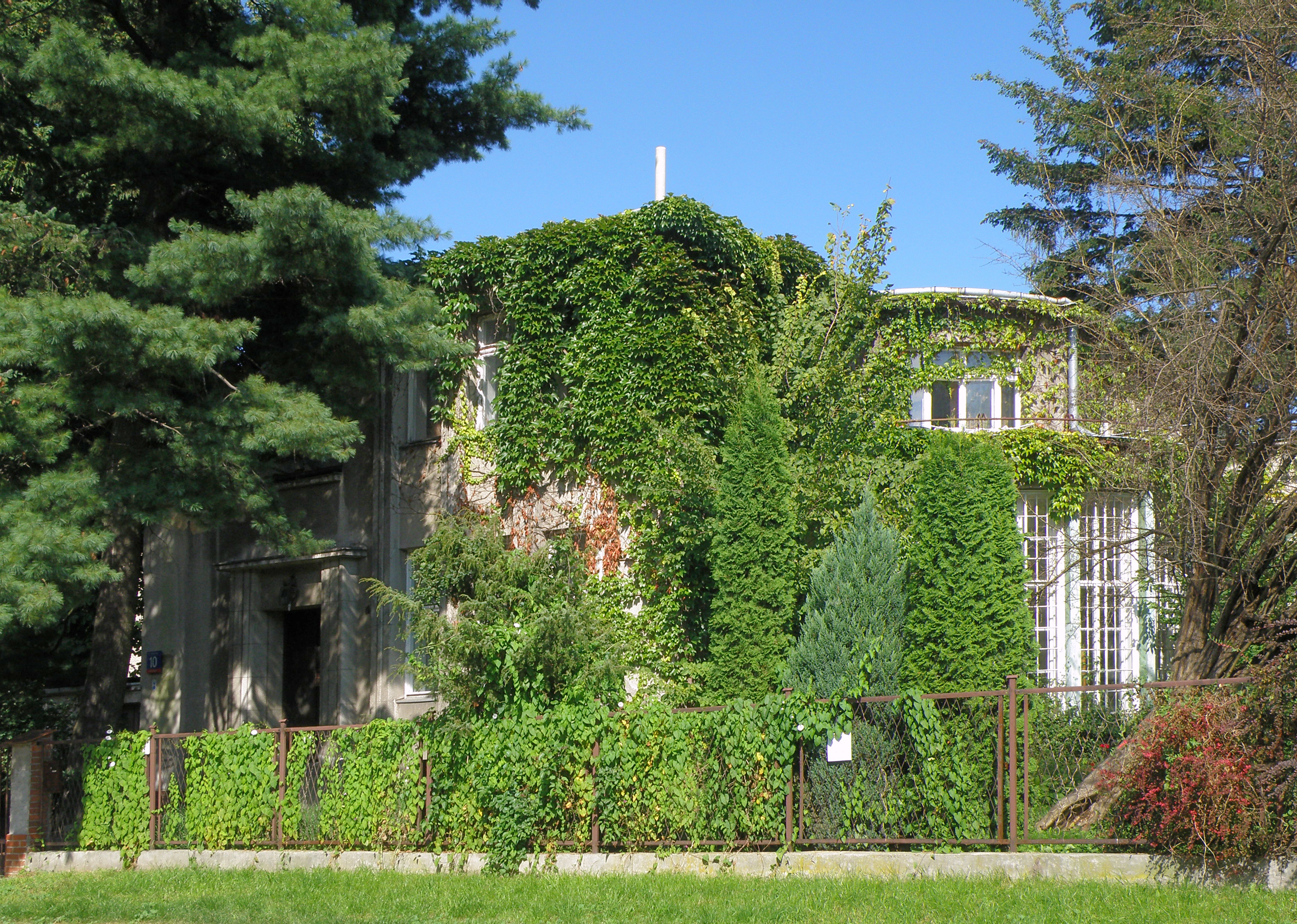
10 Katowicka Street: Romans' villa designed by Marian Lalewicz

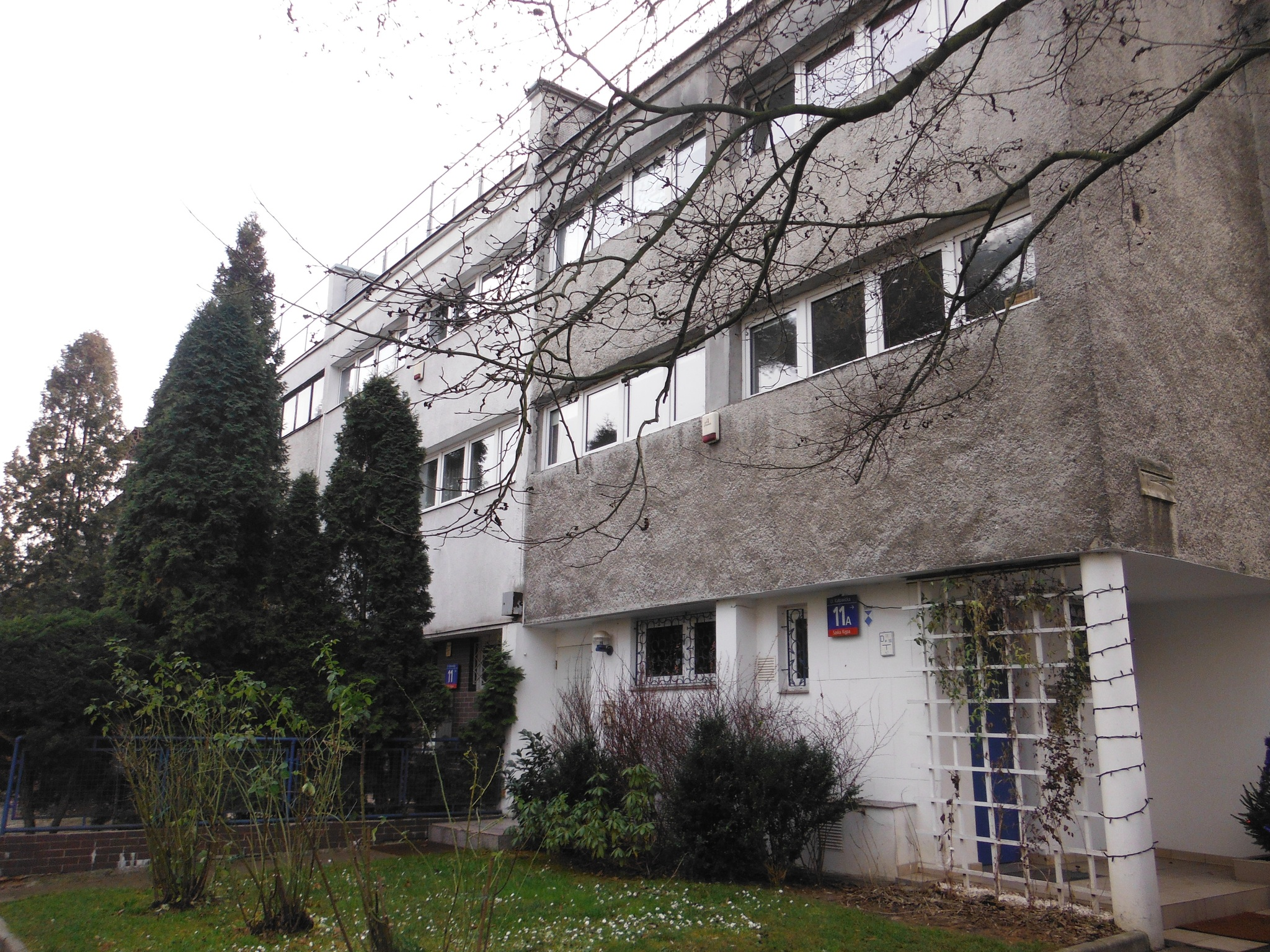
9/11/11A Katowicka Street

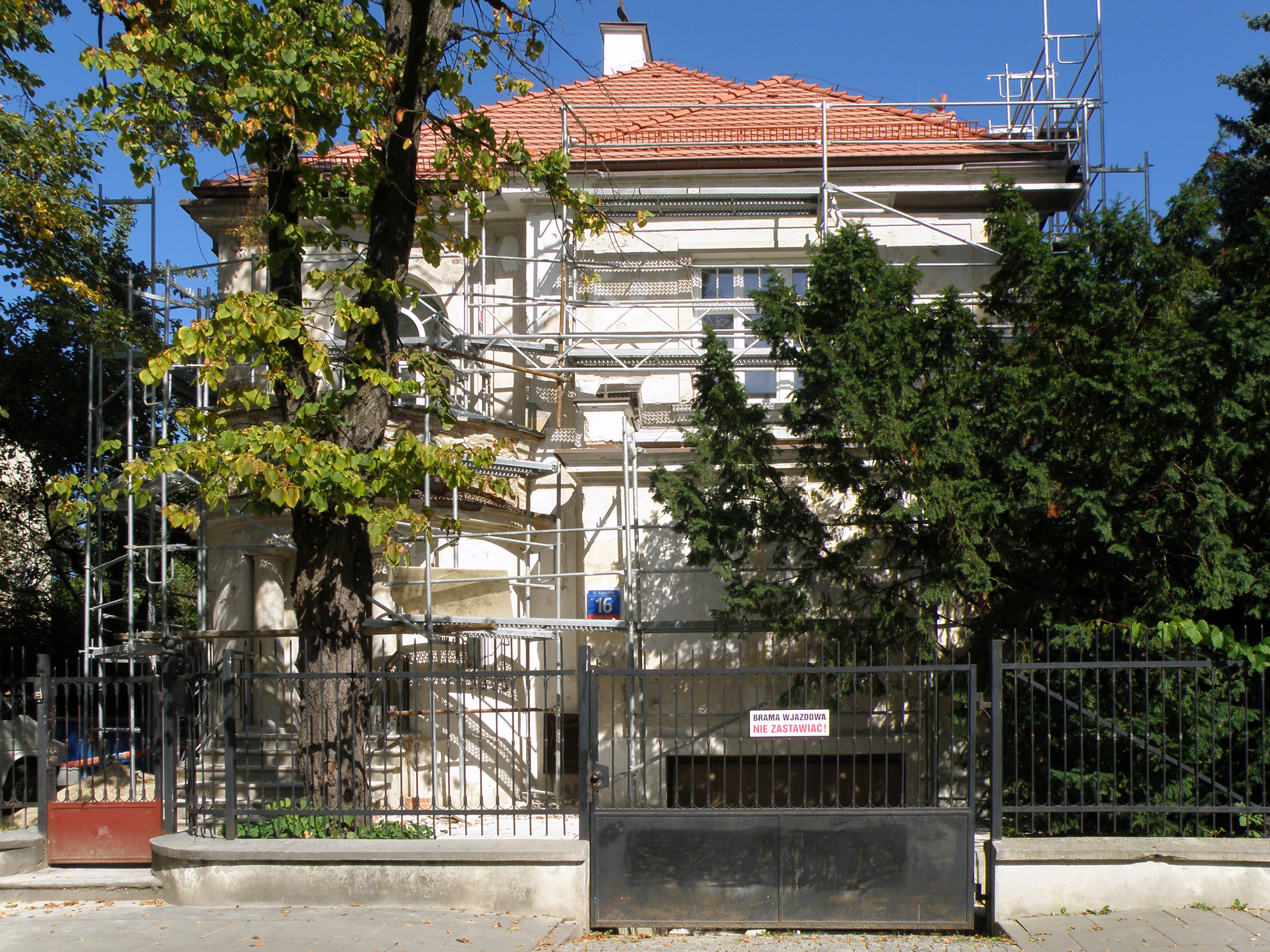
16 Katowicka Street

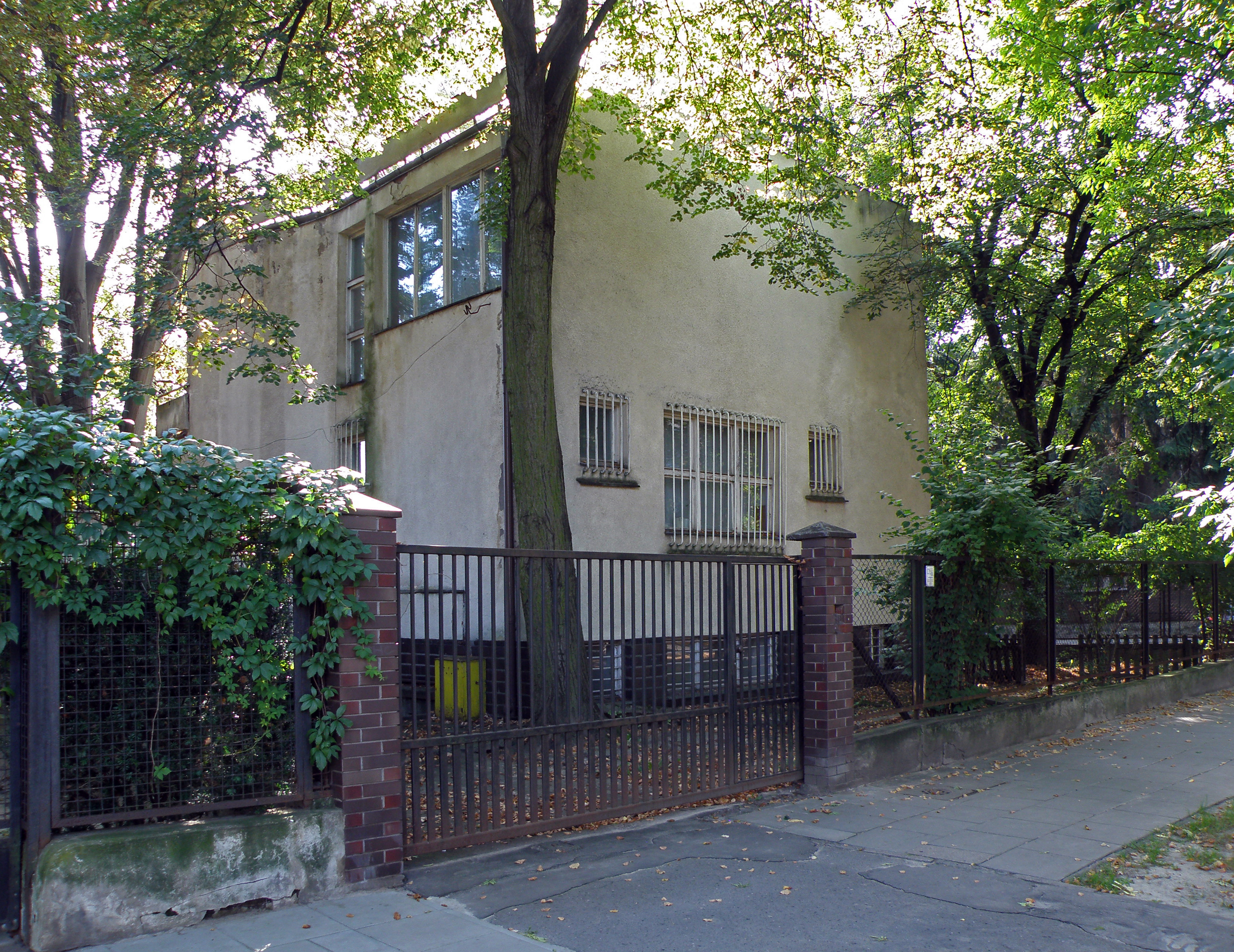
26 Katowicka Street

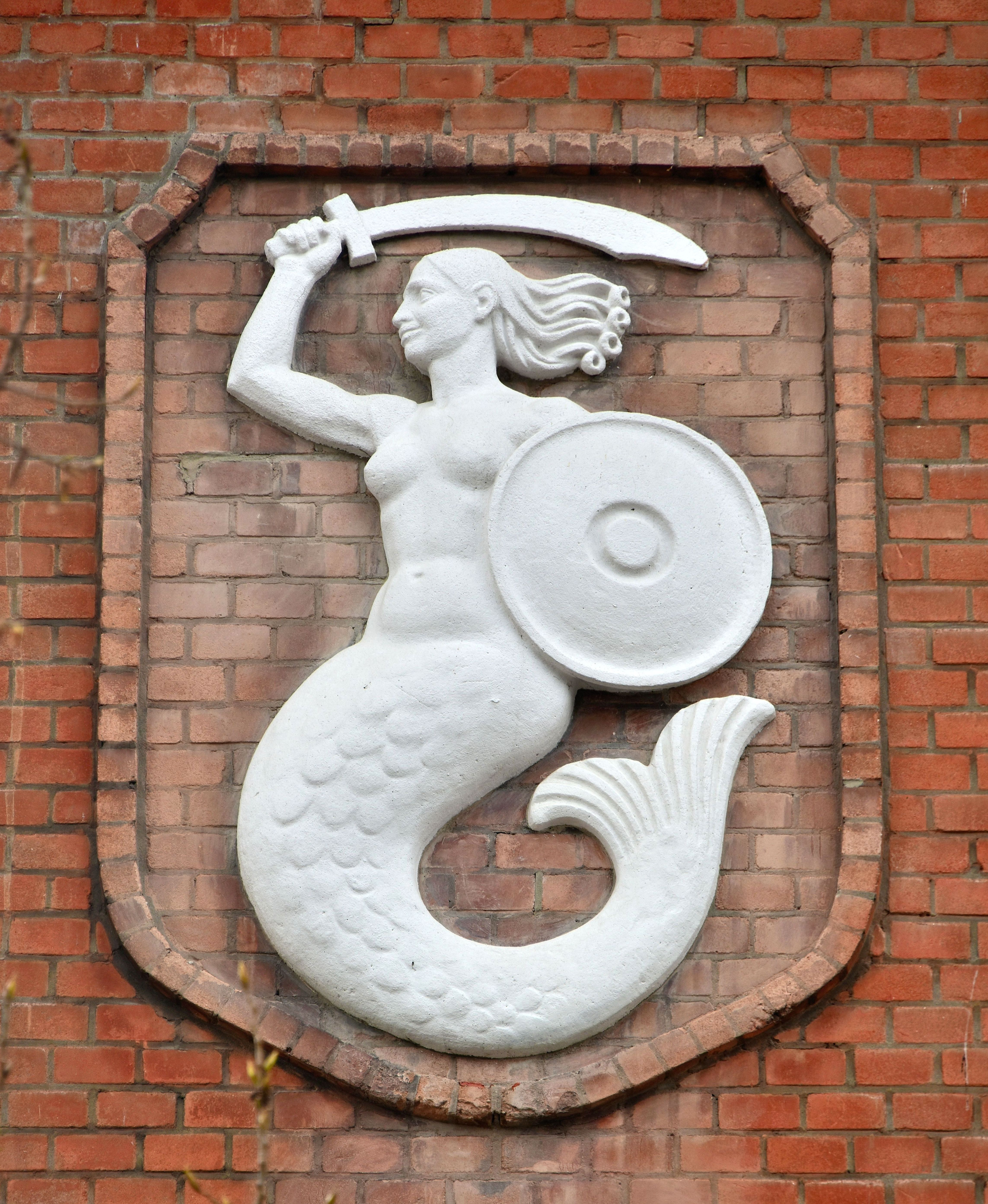
Warsaw Mermaid by Wojciech Czerwosz

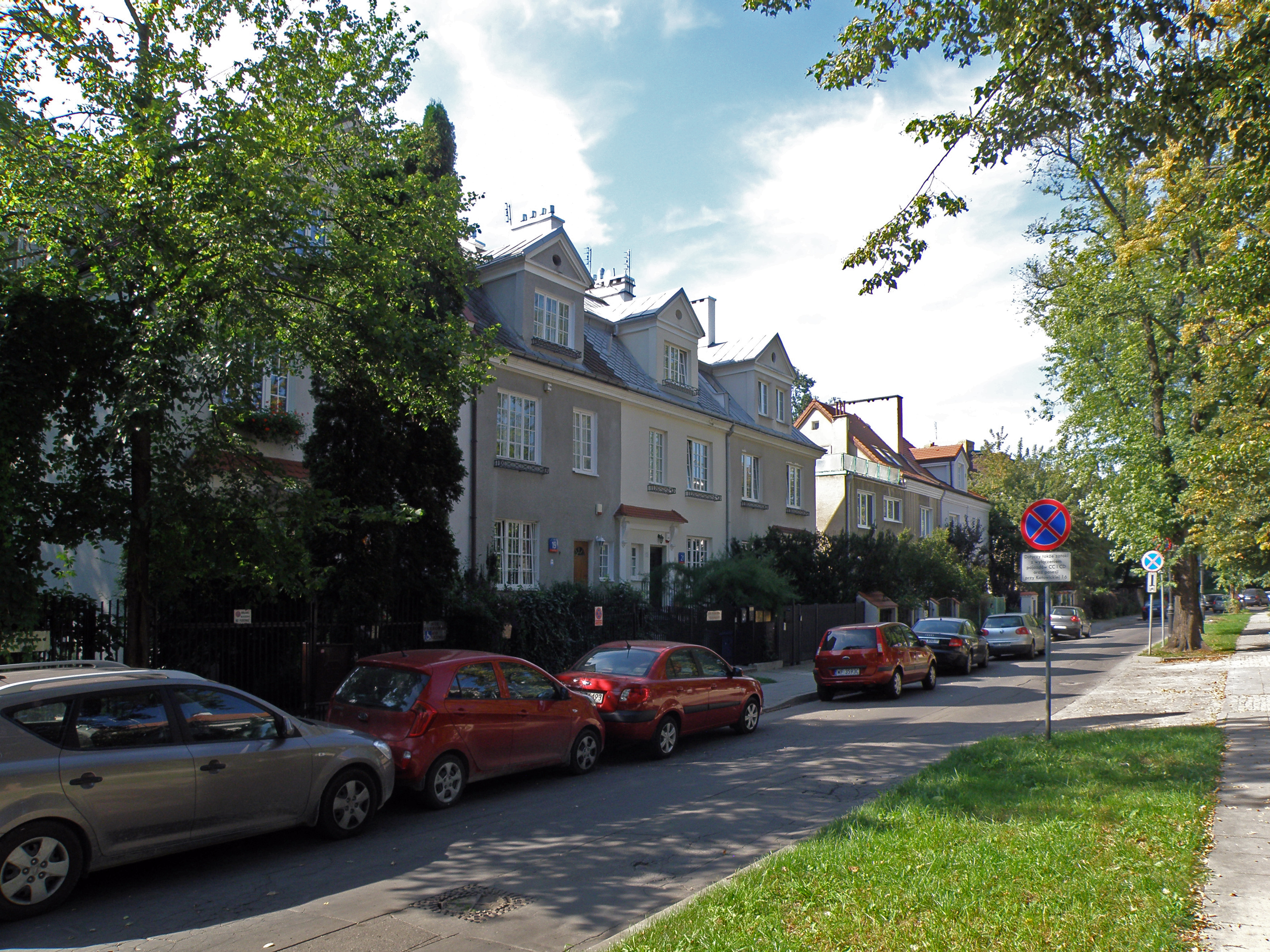
Łaski Colony

=== Sculptural decoration and street furniture ===
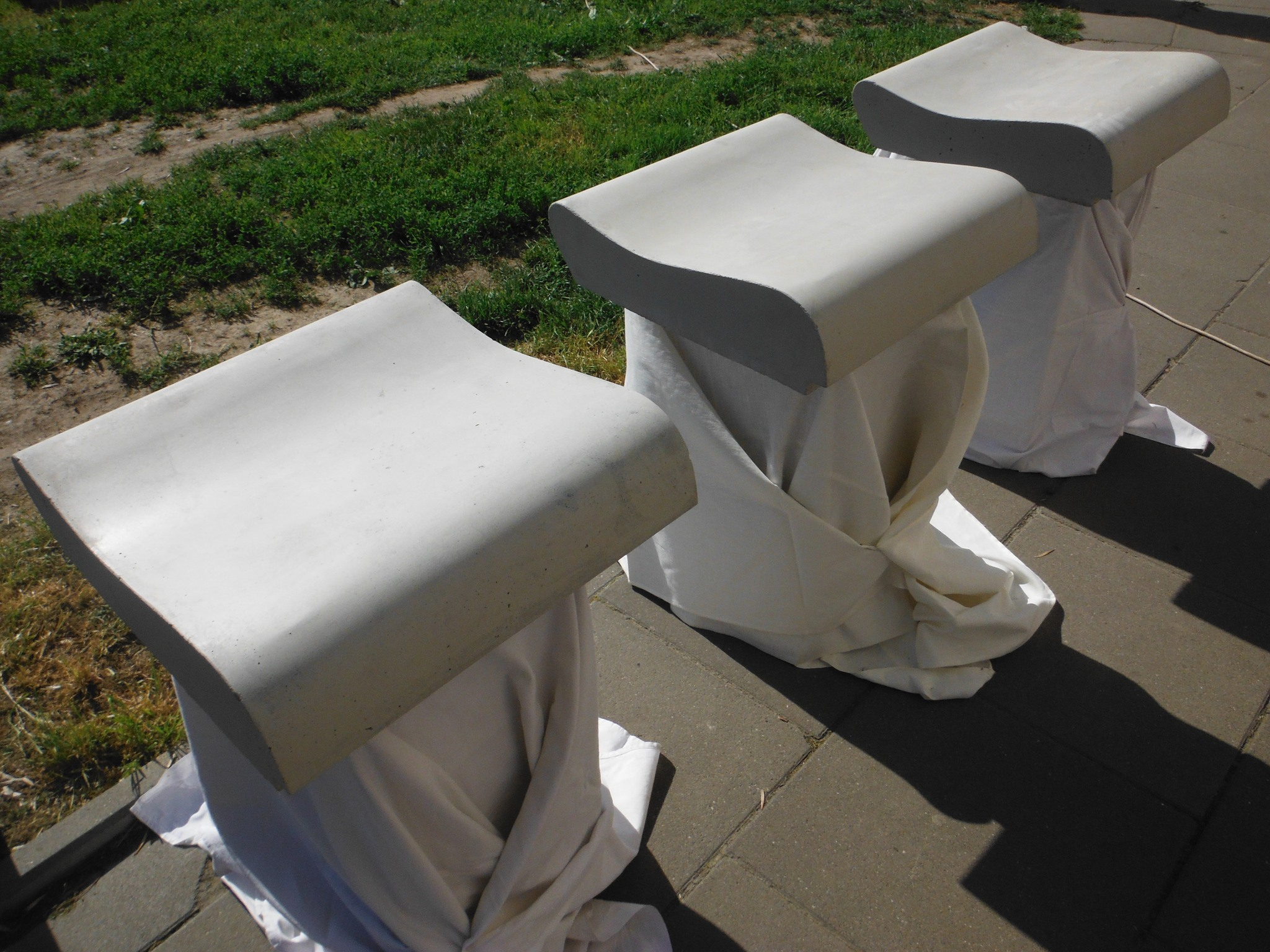
Reconstructed concrete bench seats

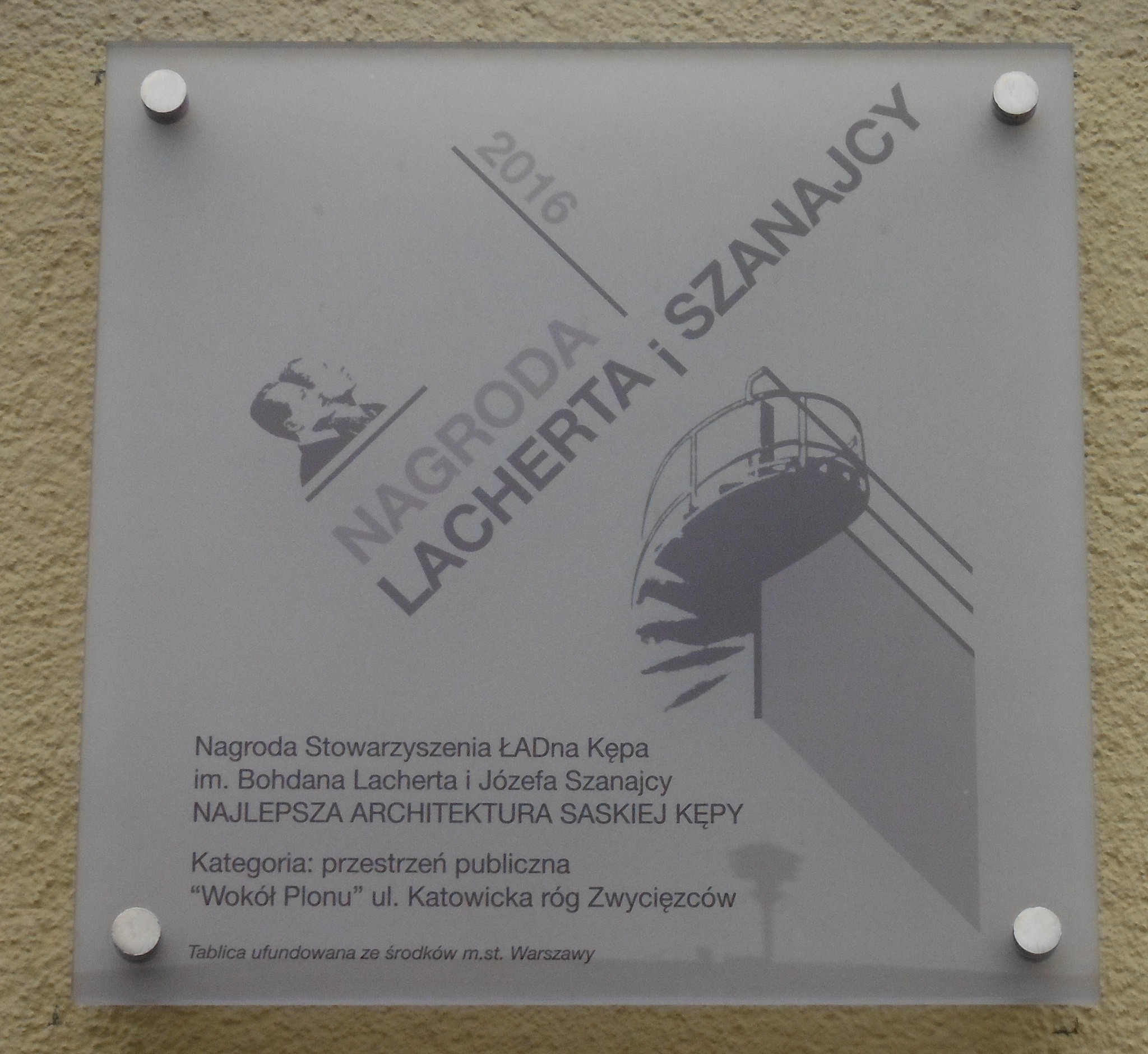
Plaque with information about the Bohdan Lachert and Jozef Szanajca Award

Although the changes introduced on Katowicka Street in the late 1940s were significant, little remains of them today, especially the decorative elements introduced at that time. The fate of the sculptures located there is unknown. They likely fell victim to devastation over the years, or possibly were stolen. Among the missing works are the Bear Playing with a Fish (a fountain made by Jerzy Jarnuszkiewicz), Stanisław Sikora's Bear, Stefan Momot's Boy with a Sailboat, and Józef Trenarowski's Badger. New elements included concrete benches (on stone walls) and park lanterns placed on both sides of the street, lower than the common lanterns (pastorałki) in Warsaw at that time. Remnants from this period include the decoration on the facade of the house at 8A Katowicka Street and the Plon bas-relief (both works by Jerzy Jarnuszkiewicz). Due to the poor condition of the bas-relief, the local community initiated the Around Plon project, which led to its restoration in 2011. Further actions planned under the project include restoring benches and organizing the square at the corner of Katowicka and Zwycięzców Streets. Bench construction began in September 2014, followed by planting greenery. In 2016, the bas-relief and square were awarded the Bohdan Lachert and Józef Szanajca Award for Best Architecture of Saska Kępa in the Public Space and Greenery category.

Post-war changes on Katowicka Street are viewed differently. Initially, they were heavily criticized, including by Jerzy Baurski in Architektura magazine. Advocates for the changes included Bohdan Lachert, who wrote that the glaring contrasts of snobbery, profit motives, bad taste, shoddiness, and cheap labor were mitigated by composing space between buildings, adopting a common plan for front gardens, introducing greenery, removing fences, and placing decorative sculptures. However, all elements of the new concept did not violate the original assumptions of the architecture represented by pre-war buildings. According to Hanna Faryna-Paszkiewicz, this may have been an attempt to implement such changes to meet demands for democratizing space without violating examples of interwar architecture.

== Bibliography ==
- Faryna-Paszkiewicz, Hanna (2001). Saska Kępa. Warsaw: Murator. ISBN 83-915407-0-7.
- Piwowar, Magdalena; Piątek, Grzegorz; Trybuś, Jarosław (2012). SAS. Ilustrowany atlas architektury Saskiej Kępy. Centrum Architektury. ISBN 978-83-934574-0-3.
- Piątek, Grzegorz (2020). Najlepsze miasto świata. Warszawa w odbudowie 1944−1949. Warsaw: Wydawnictwo W.A.B. ISBN 978-83-280-3725-0.
