= Harvest (sculpture) =

1947 relief sculpture in Warsaw, Poland

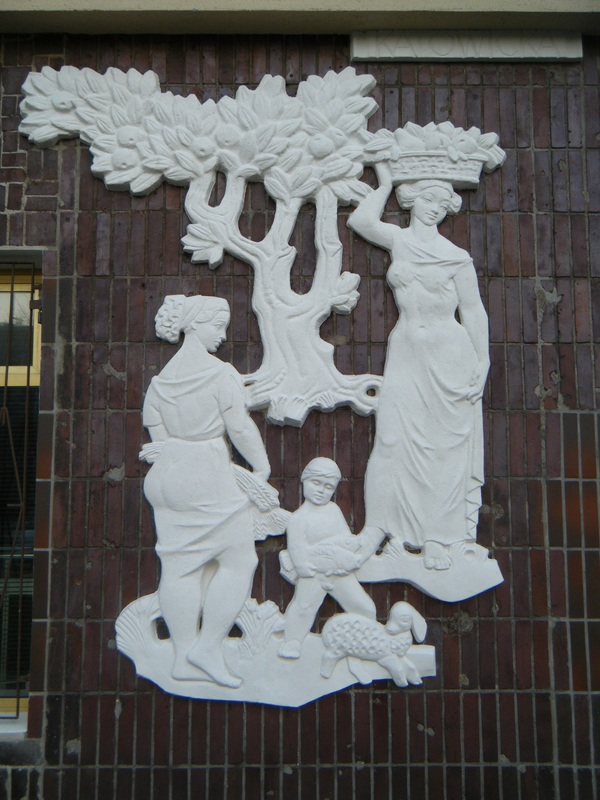
- Plon relief, as of 23 November 2011
- Interactive map of Harvest
- Location: Warsaw, Poland
- Coordinates: 52°13′51.9″N 21°3′11.7″E
- Designer: Jerzy Jarnuszkiewicz
- Type: Relief sculpture
- Material: Cement on clinker wall
- Opening date: 1947

Harvest (Polish: Plon) is a relief sculpture located on a building at the intersection of Katowicka Street and Zwycięzców Street in the Saska Kępa neighbourhood of Warsaw, Poland. Created by Jerzy Jarnuszkiewicz in 1947 as part of the post-World War II reconstruction efforts led by the Warsaw Reconstruction Office, the artwork was added to the register of historic monuments in 2011 and subsequently restored.

== Background ==
The creation and placement of Plon are closely tied to the initiatives of the Warsaw Reconstruction Office, which was headquartered at 7 Katowicka Street. The office selected this street as the site for a model residential street project, aiming to transform the character of Saska Kępa after the war. The project envisioned Katowicka Street adorned with small-scale architectural elements and artistic features, including sculptures, benches, a fountain, and a relief. The initiative was led by a team of architects under Bohdan Lachert and a group of sculptors who contributed their work without compensation. Jerzy Jarnuszkiewicz's Plon remains the best-preserved element of this decorative scheme. Despite positive reception from local residents, the artwork faced criticism, notably from Jerzy Baurski, who wrote in the 1948 issue of Architektura:

Is it possible that in the workshops of a modern, socially engaged institution, such sentimental and clichéd sculptural forms persist? How could this young, talented artist create such trite, poorly executed, and crumbling sculptures that neither complement the building's architecture nor reflect contemporary life?

== Themes and materials ==
The relief, crafted from cement and affixed to a clinker brick wall at the building's corner, depicts two women carrying the titular "harvest" (Plon). They are accompanied by a young boy holding two fish and a lamb, with a tree in the background. In 2011, damaged sections were temporarily filled with drawings, and after restoration, missing parts were reconstructed using artificial stone.

== Restoration history ==
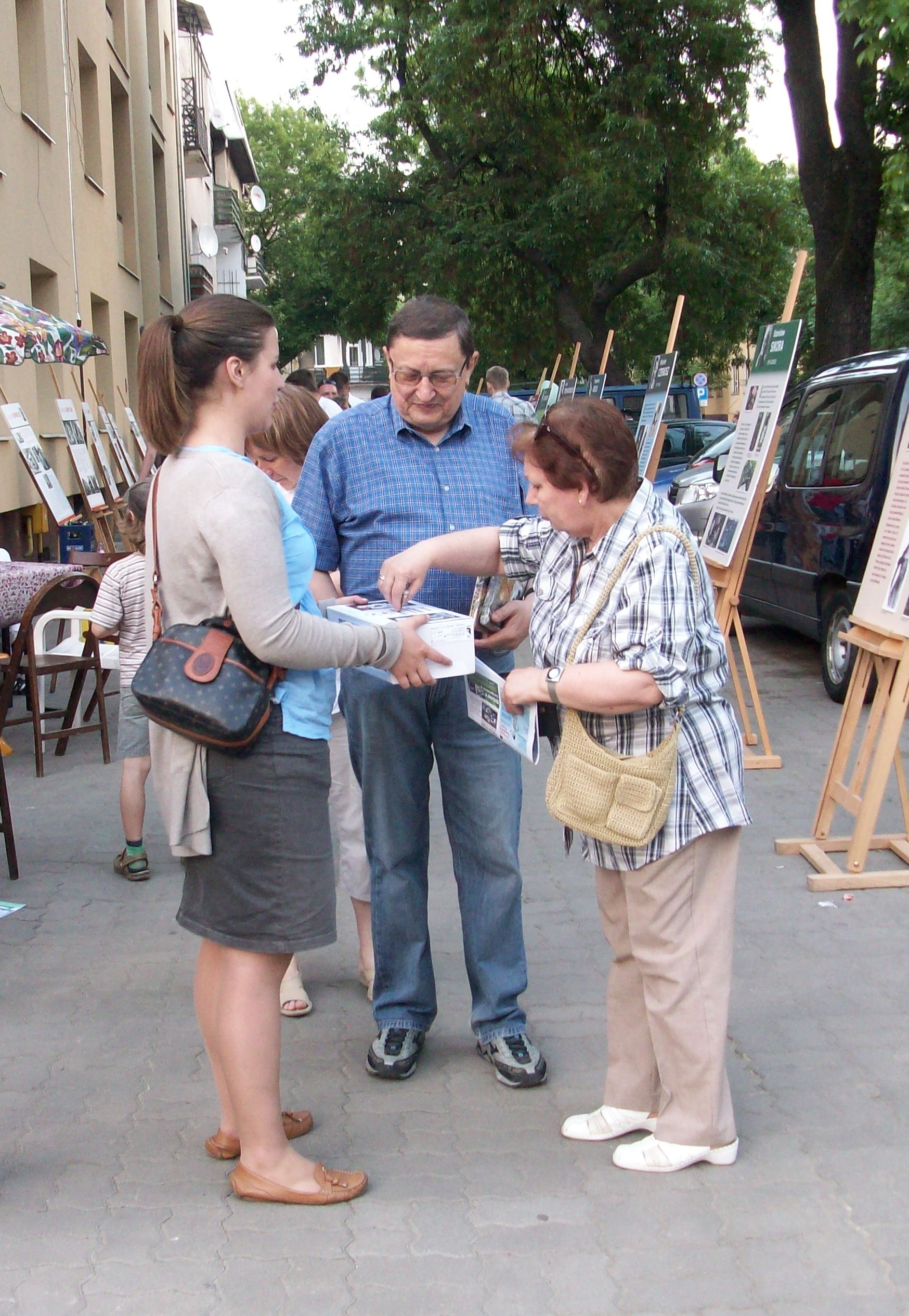
Fundraising event, May 2011

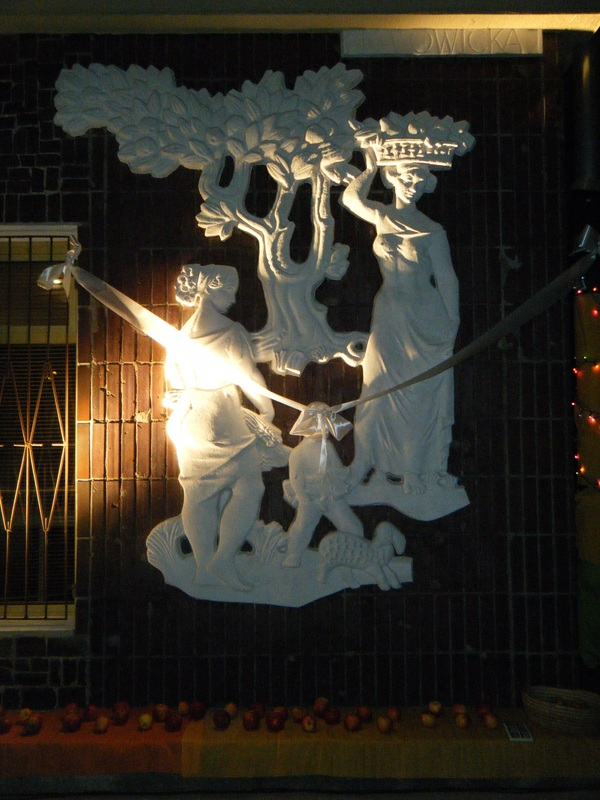
Plon just before unveiling, November 2011

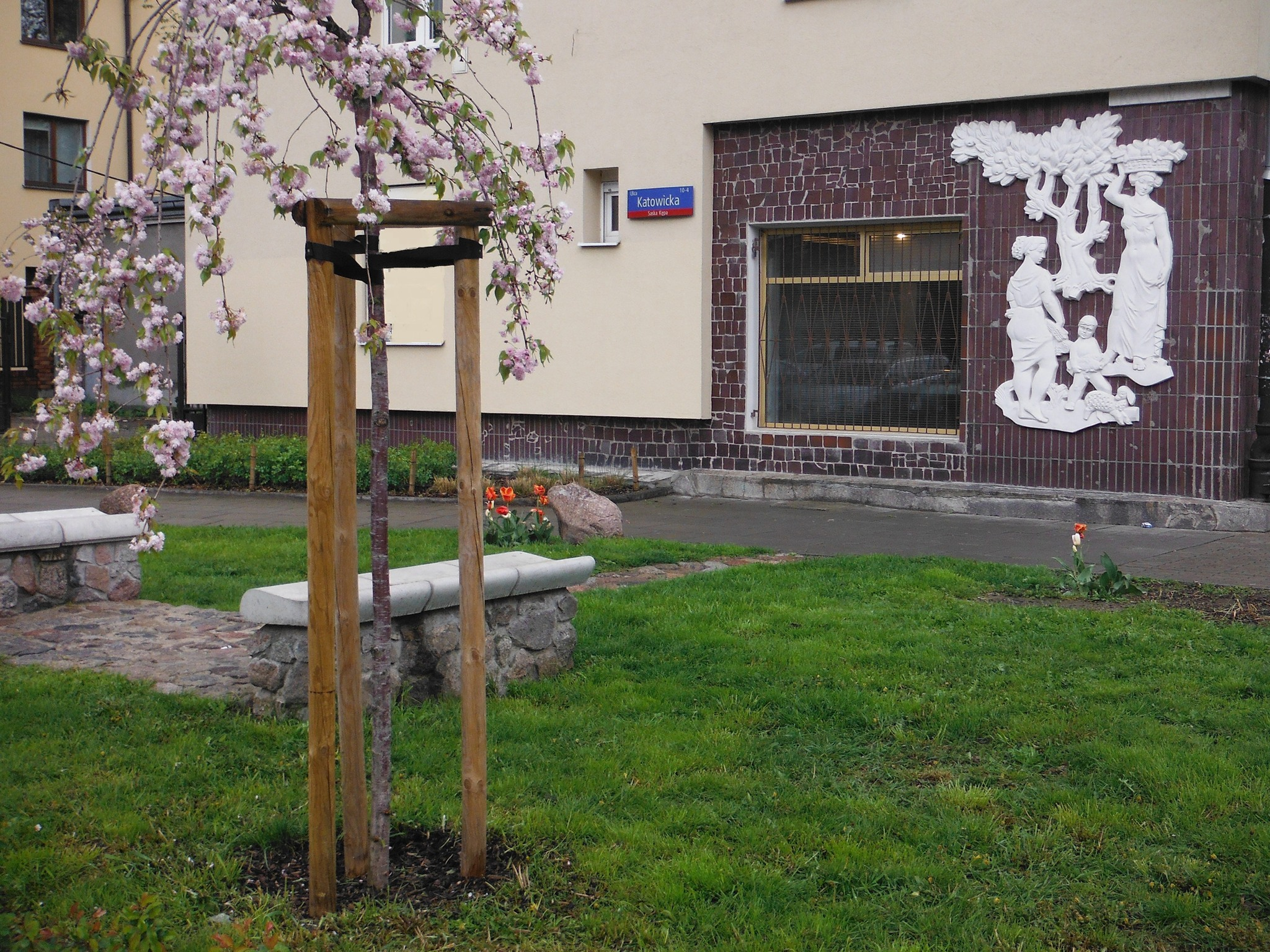
Revitalized square with restored benches, April 2016

Over time, the decorative elements along Katowicka Street, including Plon, deteriorated. By July 2011, the relief was incomplete, with parts of the boy holding fish and the lamb missing, and it had been vandalized with graffiti. The building section hosting the artwork was excluded from facade renovations due to the high costs that the housing community would have incurred. At the time, Plon was not listed in the register of historic monuments, which prevented funding from the Warsaw Heritage Conservation Office.

The initiative to preserve Plon was spearheaded by Saska Kępa residents, led by Ewa Brykowska-Liniecka. In 2005, she began efforts to locate documentation for the relief, but Professor Waldemar Baraniewski informed her that Jarnuszkiewicz worked from general sketches only, meaning the 1940s artwork itself was the primary reference for restoration. The initiative gained support from the Saska Kępa residents' association and the ŁADna Kępa organization, sparking further actions. The Kępa Cafe Foundation for Cultural and Social Activities also contributed.

On 10 November 2010, a happening was organized under Plon, featuring actress Magdalena Gnatowska. In January 2011, following a request from the residents' community, the regional conservator, Barbara Jezierska, approved the inclusion of Plon in the register of historic monuments. During the Saska Kępa Festival in May 2011, residents organized a "Meeting at Plon" event, featuring exhibitions about architects and sculptors associated with the district. Volunteers informed visitors about the restoration campaign and encouraged contributions to a public fundraiser. The effort raised 2,547.88 PLN, though the total restoration cost was estimated at 49,000 PLN. The mayor of Praga-Południe and the Warsaw Heritage Conservation Office pledged 30,000 PLN in funding.

The Warsaw City Council and the Teresa Sahakian Foundation provided additional funding, and in July 2011, the relief was removed from the building for conservation by Bartosz Markowski in a workshop near Warsaw. The restoration, completed in October 2011, involved cleaning old paint, filling cracks with resin, adding stainless steel reinforcements, and reconstructing missing parts with artificial stone. The relief was repainted white, and the entire building corner was renovated at a total cost of approximately 50,000 PLN.

The unveiling ceremony on 23 November 2011 drew nearly 200 attendees, including Praga-Południe mayor Tomasz Kucharski, who remarked:

At a time when so many monuments are lost, this example is particularly commendable.

Art historians spoke at the event, and the project initiator announced further efforts under the "Around Plon" initiative to restore other historical decorative elements of Katowicka Street. In 2013, during the Saska Kępa Festival, residents temporarily revitalized the square in front of Plon to highlight the former concrete benches and greenery, raising 1,855.89 PLN for their reconstruction. The restored benches were unveiled during the 2014 Saska Kępa Festival. That year, the square revitalization project was submitted to the participatory budget for 2015. Bench reconstruction began in September 2014, followed by greenery planting. In 2016, the relief and its square received the Bohdan Lachert and Józef Szanajca Award for "Best Architecture of Saska Kępa" in the "Public Space and Greenery" category.

== Gallery ==
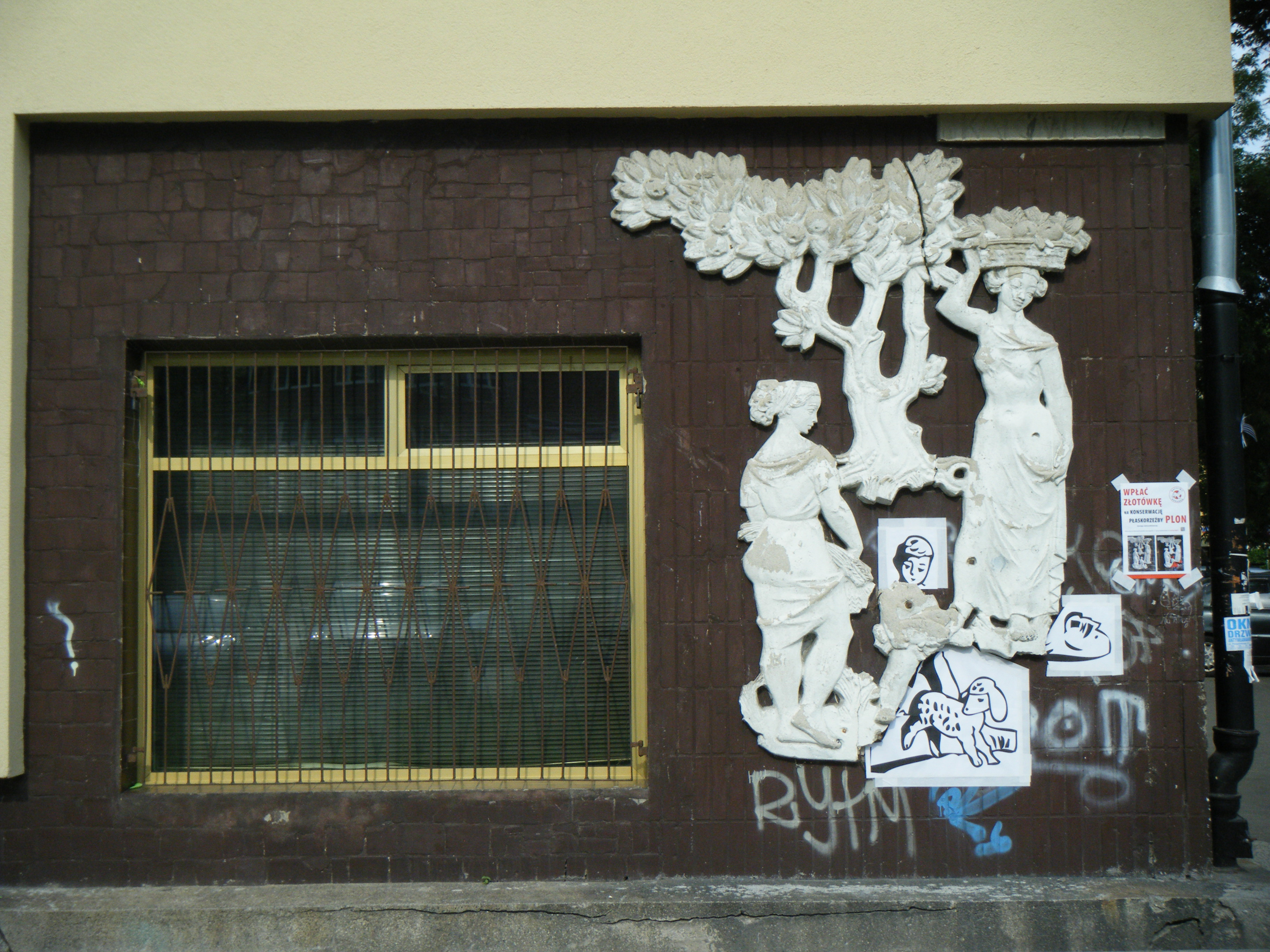
Plon before restoration

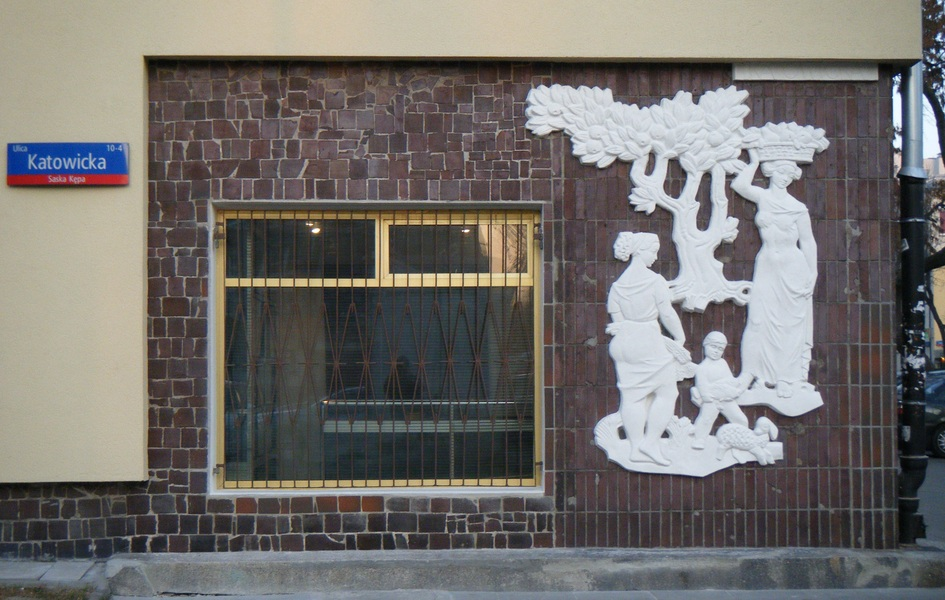
Plon after restoration

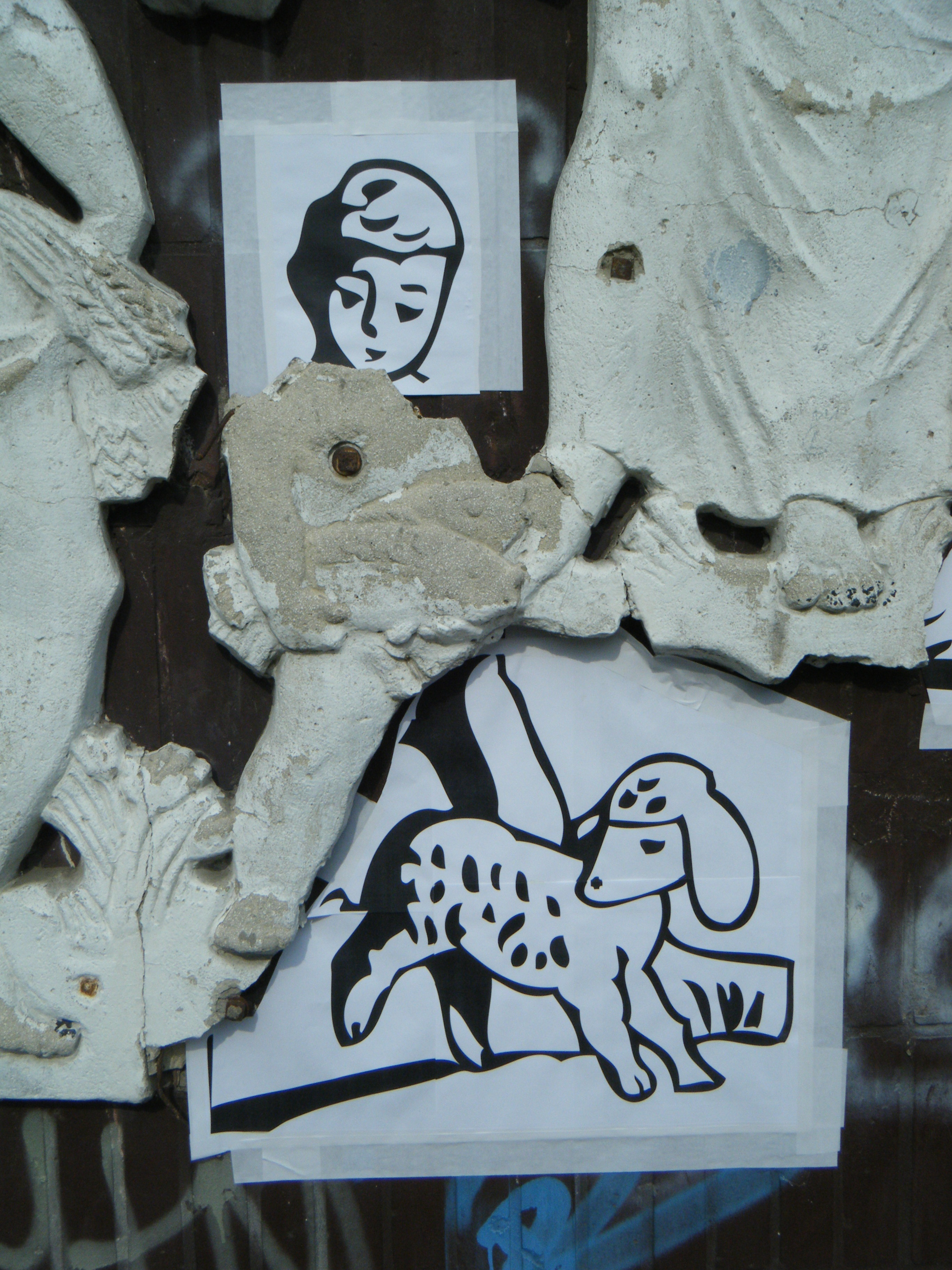
Close-up: Boy with lamb before restoration

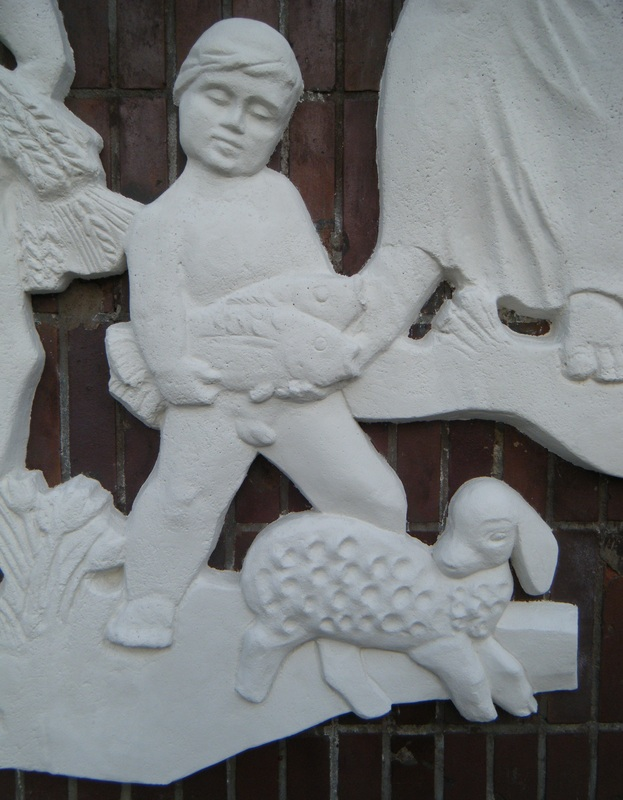
Close-up: Boy with lamb after restoration

== Bibliography ==
- Faryna-Paszkiewicz, Hanna (2001). Saska Kępa (in Polish). Warsaw: Murator. ISBN 83-915407-0-7.
