= Obrońców Street =

Street in Warsaw, Poland

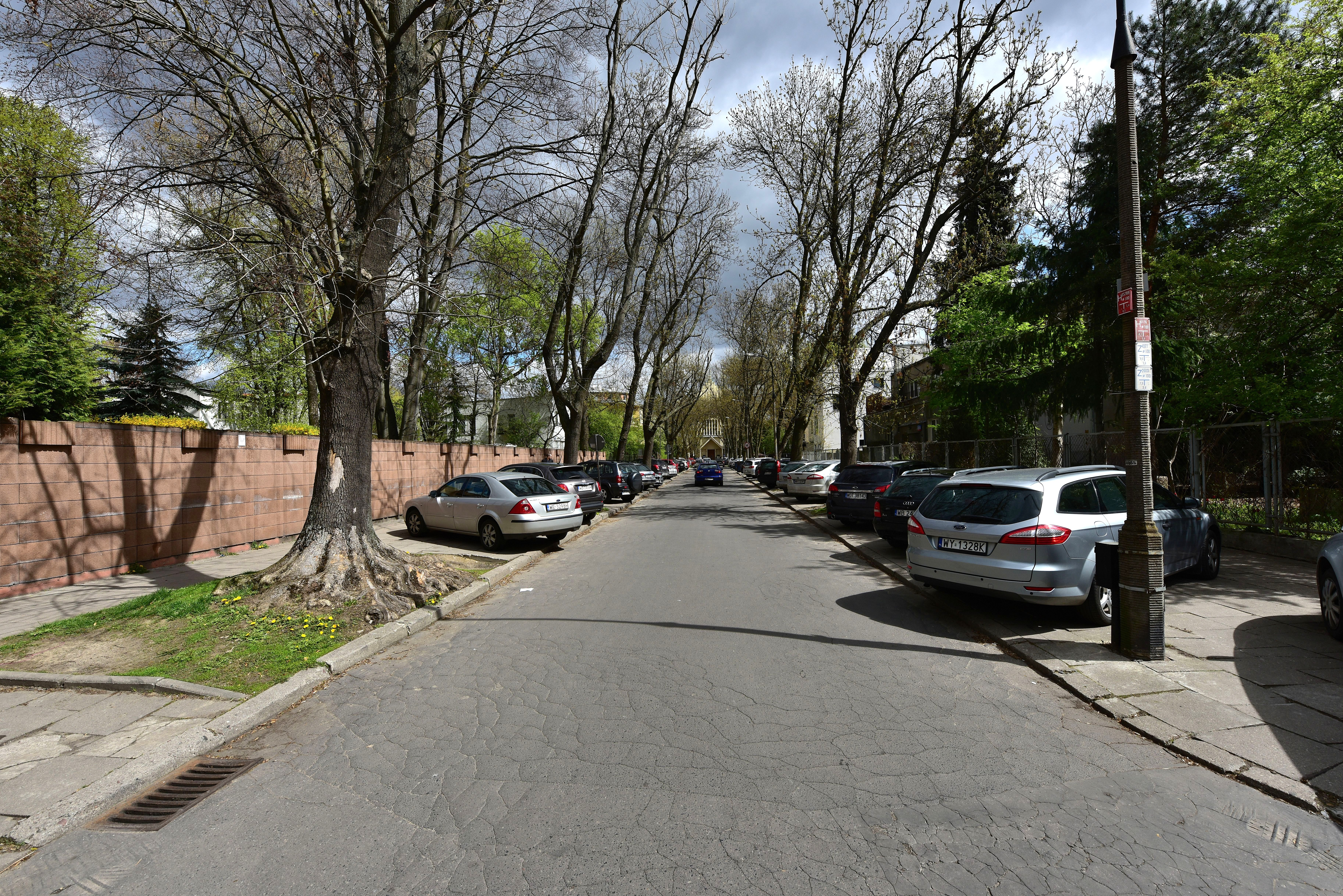
- Obrońców Street at the intersection with Królowej Aldony Street
- Interactive map of Obrońców Street
- Part of: Saska Kępa
- Location: Warsaw, Poland
- Coordinates: 52°13′58.8″N 21°03′11.7″E

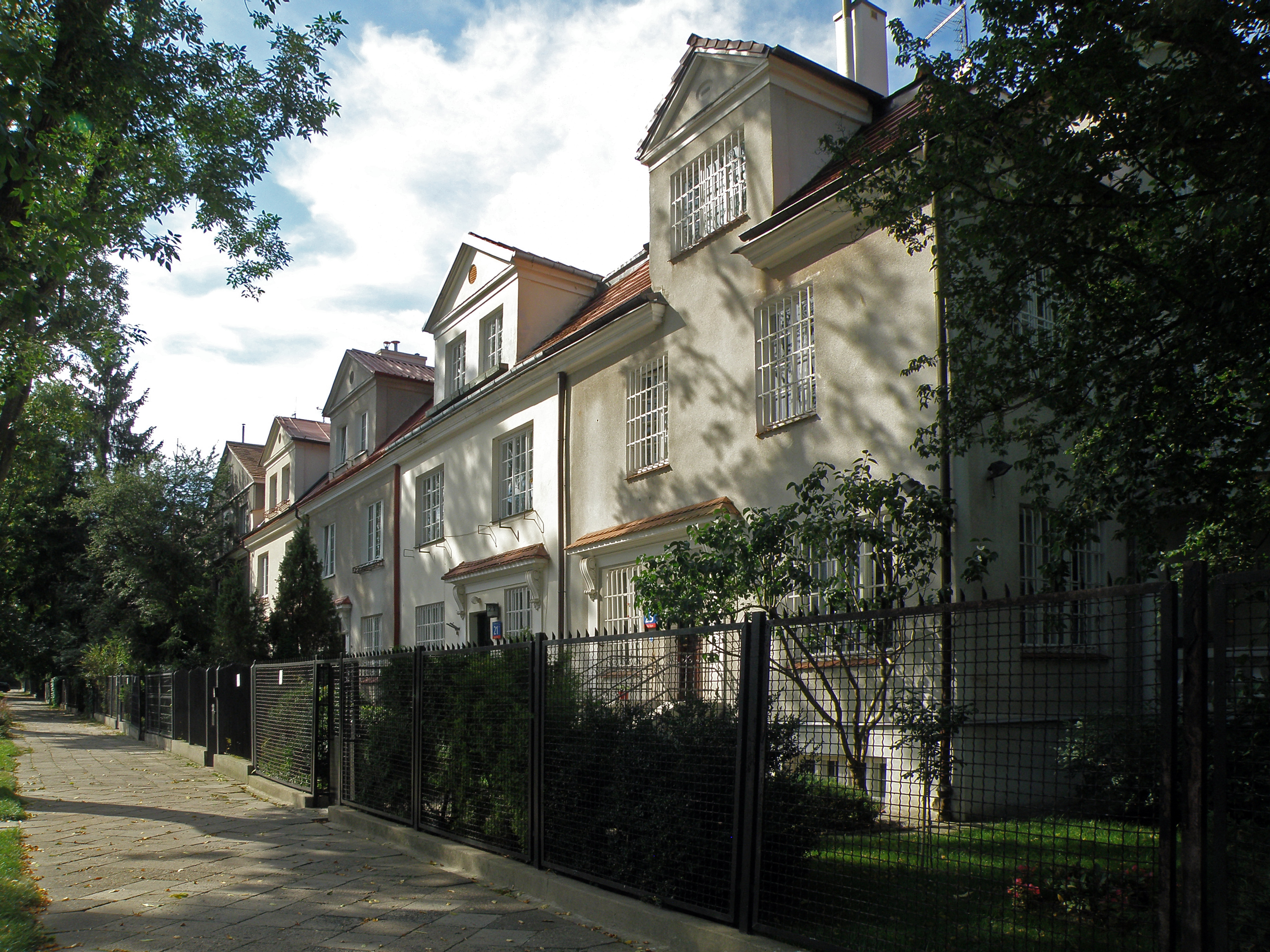
Łaski Colony at 23 Obrońców Street

Obrońców Street is a street in the Saska Kępa neighbourhood of the Praga-Południe district in Warsaw, Poland. It begins near Wał Miedzeszyński Street and ends at Niekłańska Street.

The street is lined primarily with residential buildings, including 13 from the interwar period that are listed in the Registry of Cultural Property. Named in 1926, the street's name commemorates the defenders of Poland during World War I and the struggle for independence.

== History ==
Obrońców Street lies partly in the oldest section of Saska Kępa. Its name was officially designated by a Warsaw City Council resolution on 27 September 1926. Much of the development between Wał Miedzeszyński and Francuska streets dates to the interwar period. Between 1934 and 1938, the Wawer District Water Company constructed a covered canal beneath the street. In September 1939, the street was a site of combat during the Invasion of Poland. After the German occupation, the Warsaw Reconstruction Office decided to preserve the street's existing transport role. Plans were made to transform it into a pedestrian route leading to a church.

In August 1948, Pablo Picasso visited the headquarters of the Association of Polish Artists and Designers at 28/30 Obrońców Street. Artists such as set designer and painter Teresa Roszkowska and sculptor and medallist Stanisław Sikora had studios on the street. Poet Konstanty Ildefons Gałczyński dedicated his poem Toast na Saskiej Kępie to Henryk Ładosz, whose apartment he frequently visited. The street is also associated with landmarks like the former Bracia Pakulscy shop, the Camping café, and the Sułtan café, referenced in a song by Kalina Jędrusik for Kabaret Starszych Panów.

The street's architecture and history are leveraged by public institutions and private entities, such as for organizing urban exploration games.

== Notable buildings ==
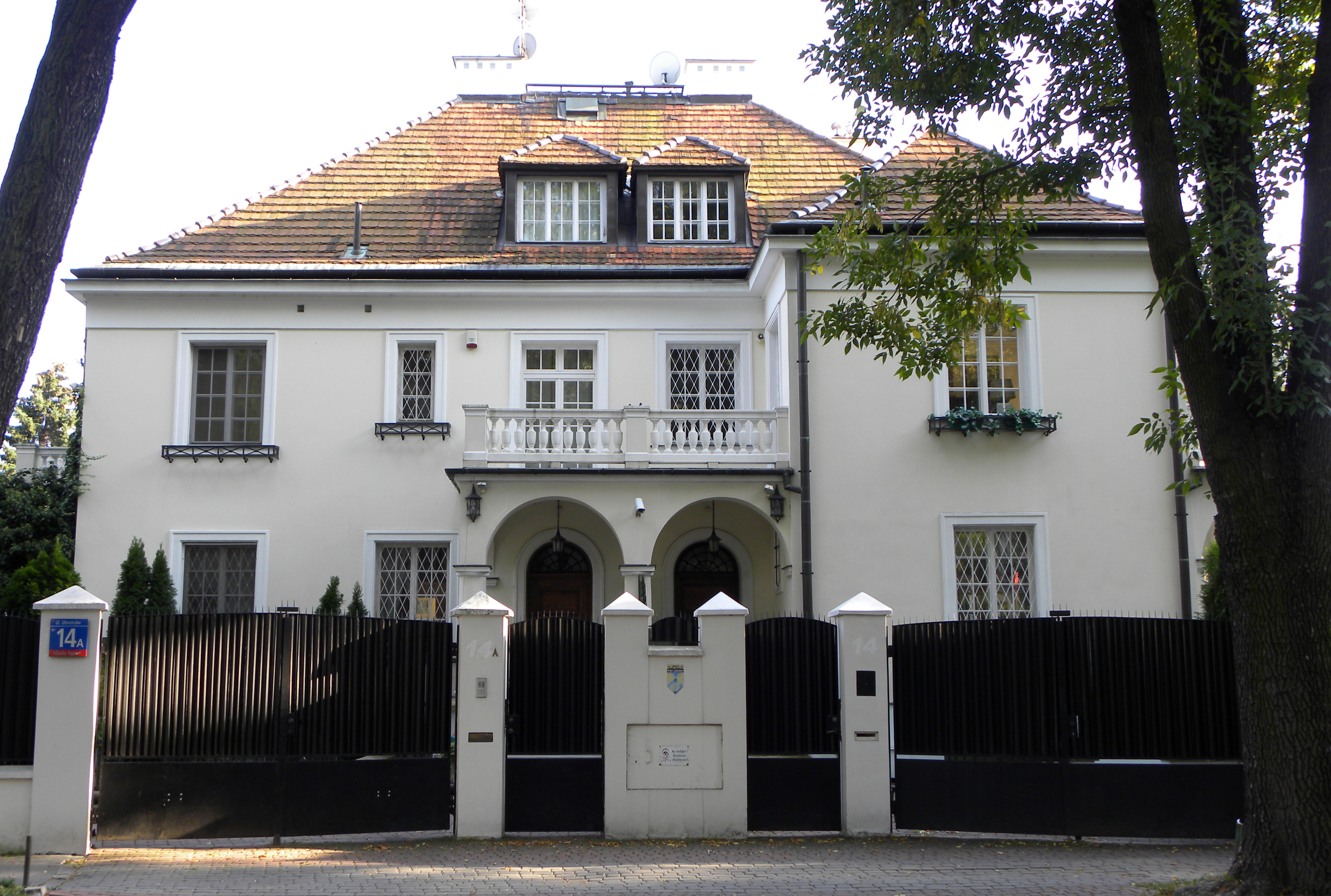
House at 14 Obrońców Street

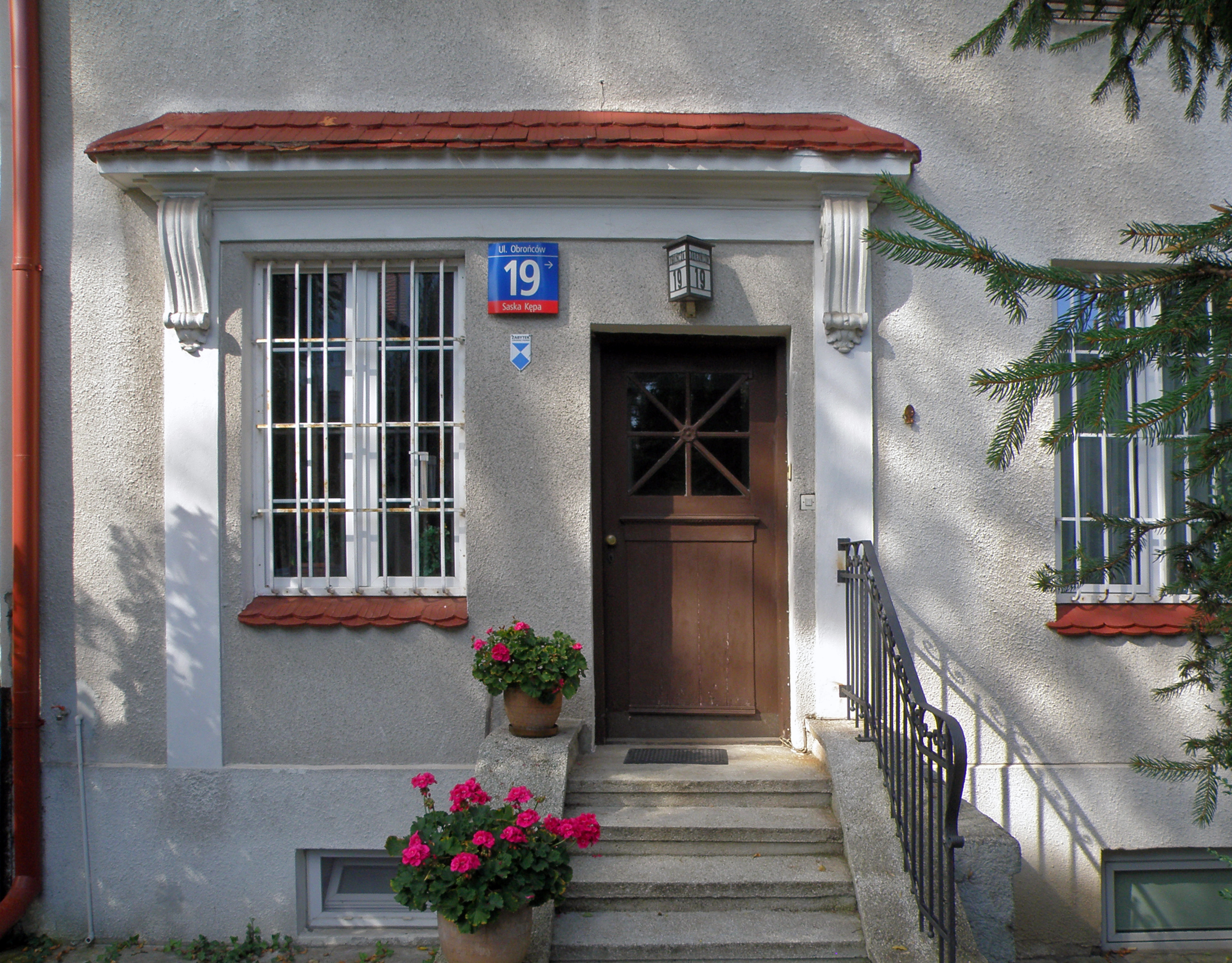
House at 19 Obrońców Street

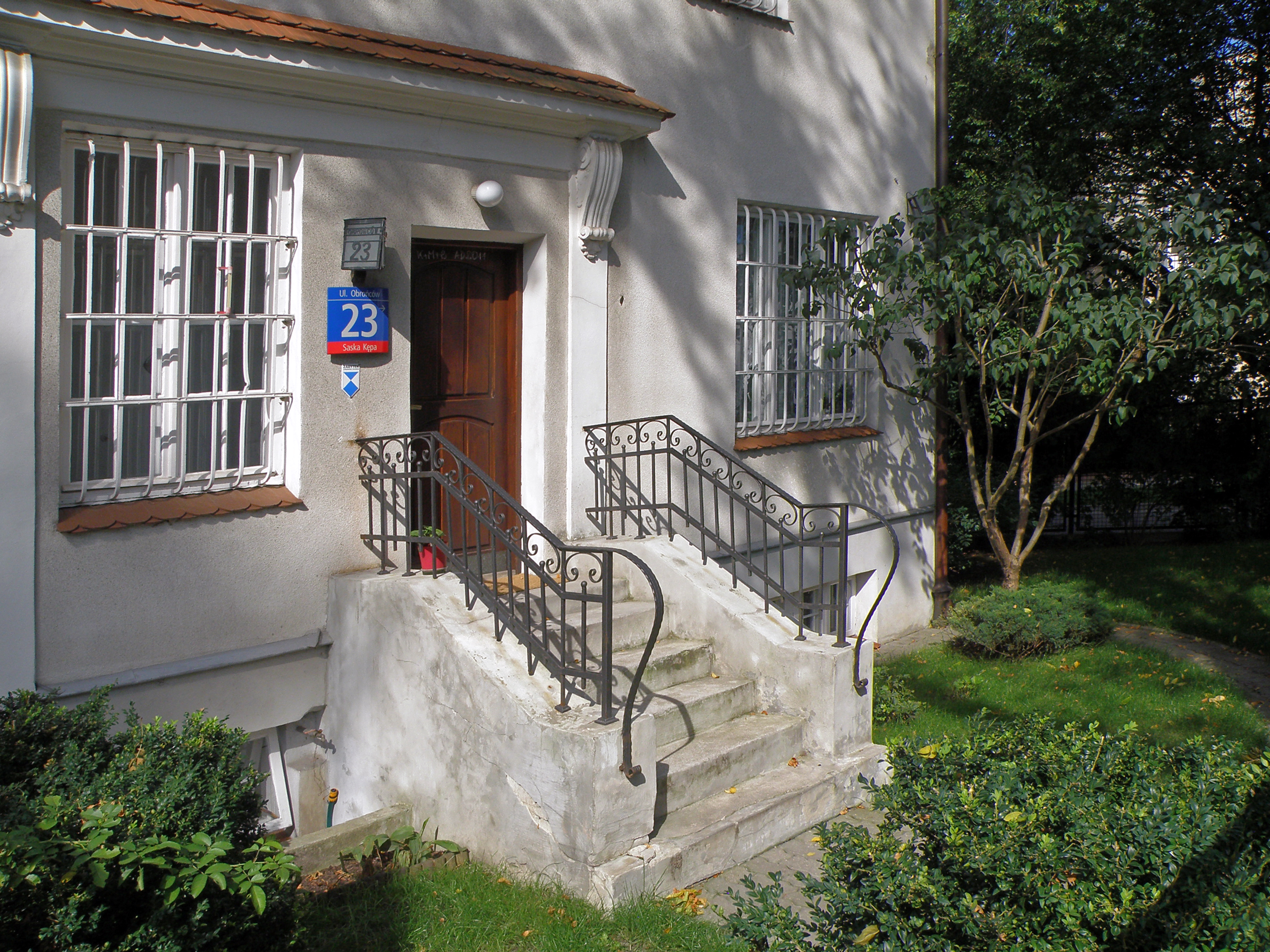
House at 23 Obrońców Street

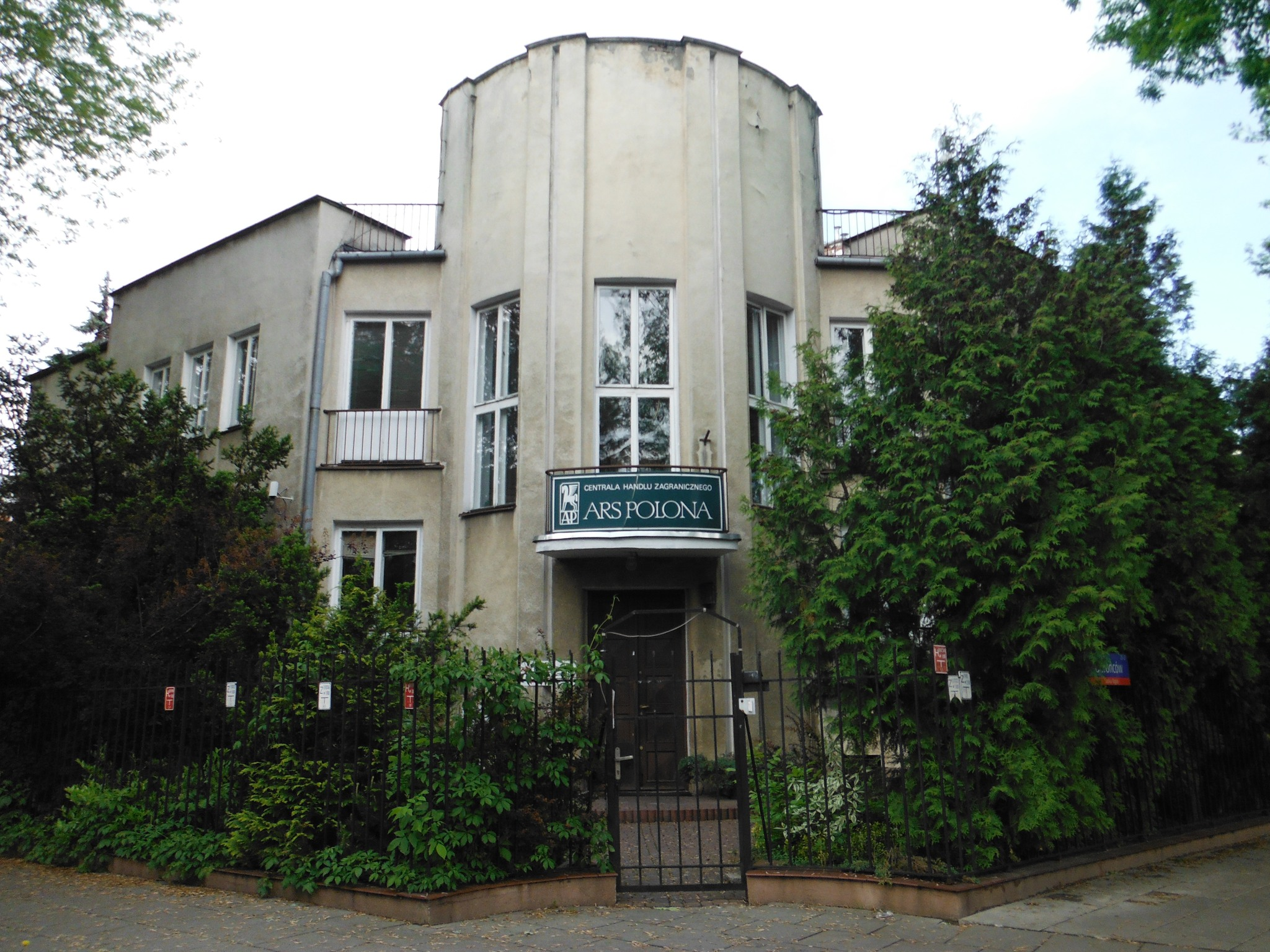
House at 25 Obrońców Street

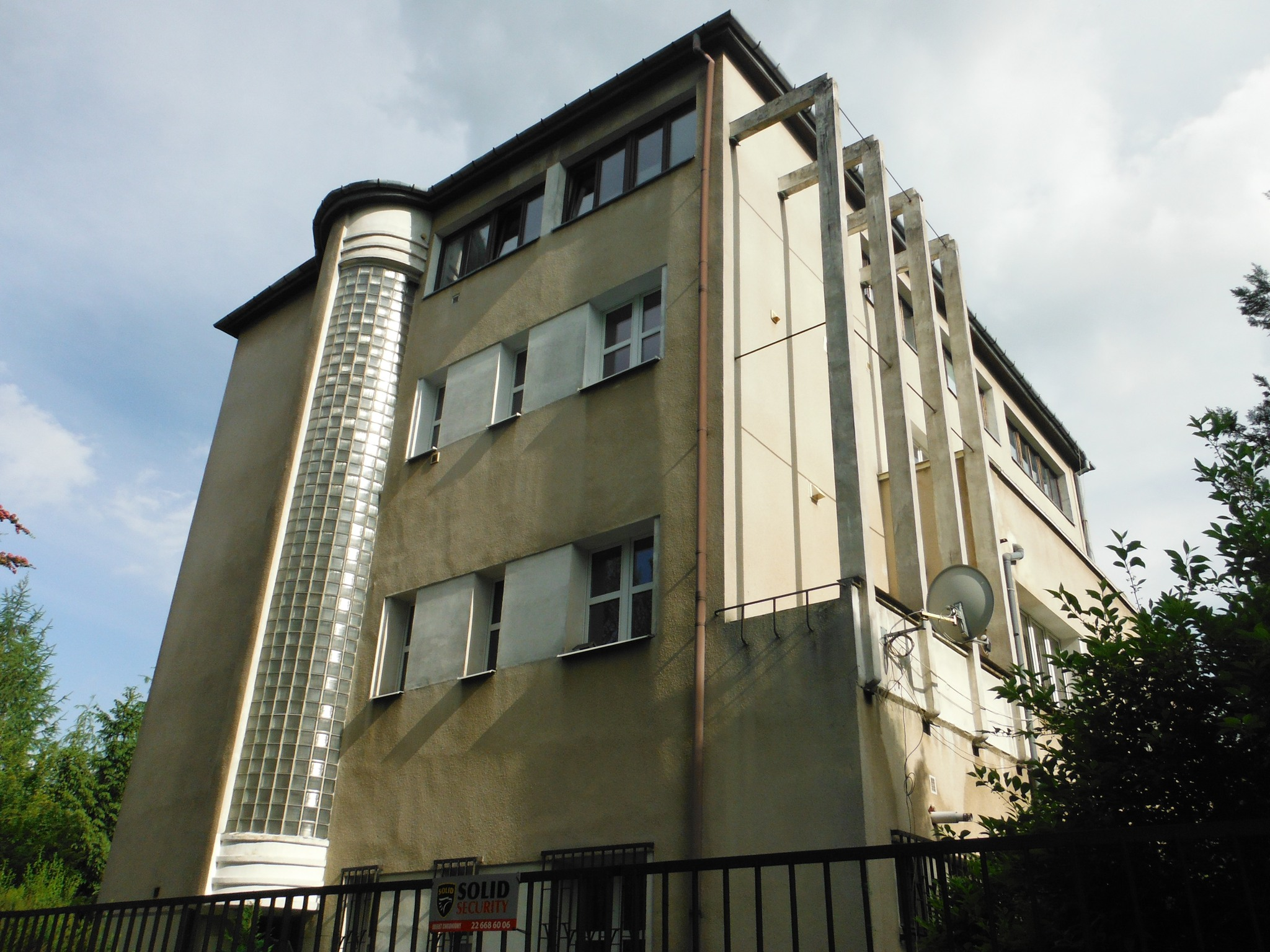
House at 26 Obrońców Street

- No. 1 – Łepkowski family house, built before 1932, designed by Stanisław Kolendo. Formerly the Economic School and French Embassy, it features distinctive pilasters on its facade.
- No. 1a – Villa from c. 1934, designed by Romuald Gutt.
- No. 2 – Ołdakowski family villa, built in 1928, designed by Bohdan Pniewski. Its original surroundings and furnishings are preserved in pre-war photographs.
- Nos. 3/5 – Row houses from 1937, designed by Julian Ambroziewicz.
- Nos. 5–23 – Part of the Łaski Colony, built in 1926 by Włodzimierz Gall. These row houses share load-bearing walls, forming a cohesive street frontage. Each features a pediment, small porch, and garden, with corner houses having balconies with balustrades. Some sources suggest materials from the demolished St. Alexander Nevsky Cathedral were used. A 1930 Kurier Warszawski article noted: "The Łaski Colony looks attractive and picturesque, especially Obrońców Street, offering a straight perspective toward Wawer, illuminated by arc lamps, creating a positive impression as a preview of a future villa district akin to Poznań's Sołacz".
  - No. 5 – House from c. 1930, listed in the register of monuments.
  - No. 7 – House from c. 1930, listed in the register of monuments.
  - No. 9 – House from c. 1930, listed in the register of monuments. Artist Kazimierz Szemioth created works there.
  - No. 11 – House from c. 1930, listed in the register of monuments.
  - No. 13 – House from c. 1930, listed in the register of monuments.
  - No. 15 – House from c. 1930, listed in the register of monuments. Home of Teresa Roszkowska.
  - No. 17 – House from c. 1930, listed in the register of monuments.
  - No. 19 – House from c. 1930, listed in the register of monuments.
  - No. 21 – House from c. 1930, listed in the register of monuments.
  - No. 23 – House from c. 1930, listed in the register of monuments.
- No. 10 – Brzeziński family villa, built after 1935 by Piotr Kwiek. Described as one of Saska Kępa's most extravagant villas, it features a rooftop terrace with a circular-opening canopy, porthole windows, slender columns, and a wavy facade.
- No. 14 – Wolski family villa, built in 1927 by Aleksander Więckowski. It features an arcaded porch at the main entrance and a garden-side conservatory. Listed in the register of monuments.
- No. 24 – Blind Children's Home, operated by the Society for the Care of the Blind. Funded by former property owner Kazimierz Sztajer, commemorated by a plaque.
- No. 25 – Felicja Trębicka villa, designed by Stanisław Nowicki, completed in 1934. An example of Art Deco with defensive architecture elements like a tower. It served as a Polish Red Cross sanitary point (No. 307) from September to November 1939 and a military hospital for five days during the Warsaw Uprising. Now used as office space.
- No. 26 – Julian Ambroziewicz's own house, built in 1938. Known as the "house with a thermometer" for its vertical glass brick slit and notable for its tall reinforced concrete pergola. In July 1949, following the owner's arrest, it was temporarily converted into a Security Service "trap" where suspects were detained for several days. Listed in the register of monuments.
- No. 27 – Ludwik Hirszfeld villa, built c. 1938 by Józef Łowiński.
- Nos. 28/30 – Building hosting the Association of Polish Artists and Designers during Pablo Picasso's 1948 visit. From 1946 to 2000, it housed Stanisław Sikora's sculpture studio. It now contains the Experimental Lithography Workshop, a branch of the Culture Promotion Centre.
- No. 31 – Former Maria Skłodowska-Curie Girls' High School, now the College of Social Service Workers. Residents included Count Ludgard Grocholski, industrialist Karol Meyerhoff, and engineer Anatol Minkowski.
- No. 33 – Filarewicz family villa, built c. 1930, likely designed by Józef Vogtman. Notable for a heraldic cartouche above the entrance, semicircular window, and pilasters. Listed in the register of monuments.
- Nos. 36/38 – A pedunculate oak designated a natural monument in 2019.
- No. 45 – Multi-family house from c. 1936, designed by Borys von Zinserling.

== Gallery ==
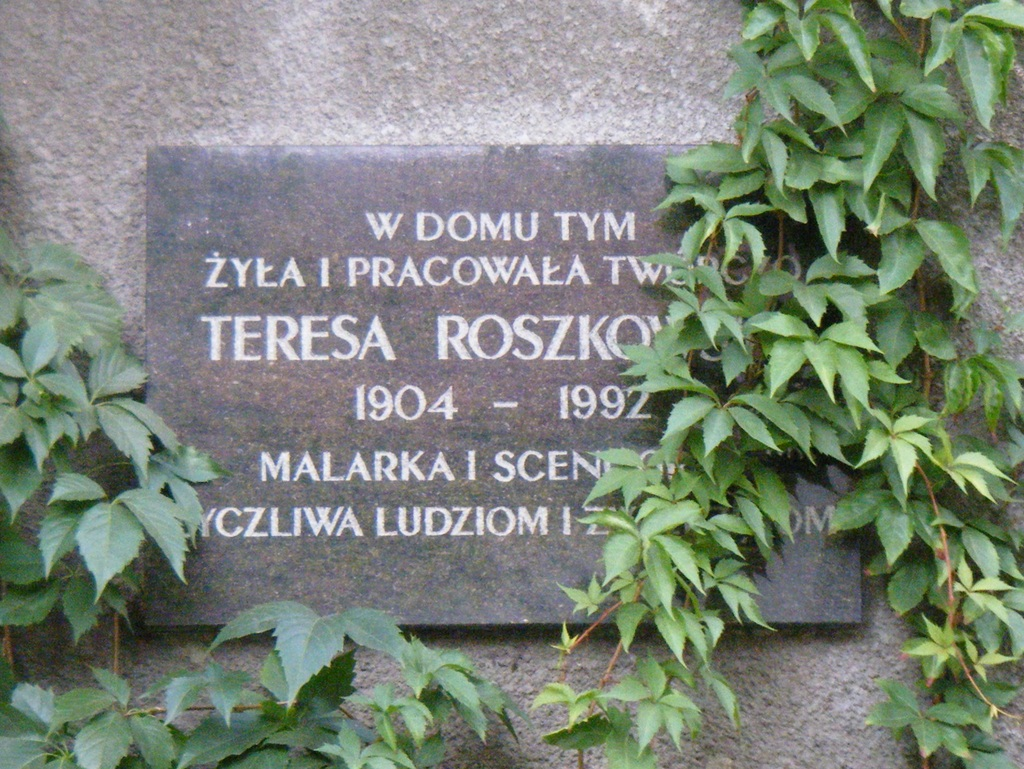
15 Obrońców Street: Commemorative plaque for Teresa Roszkowska

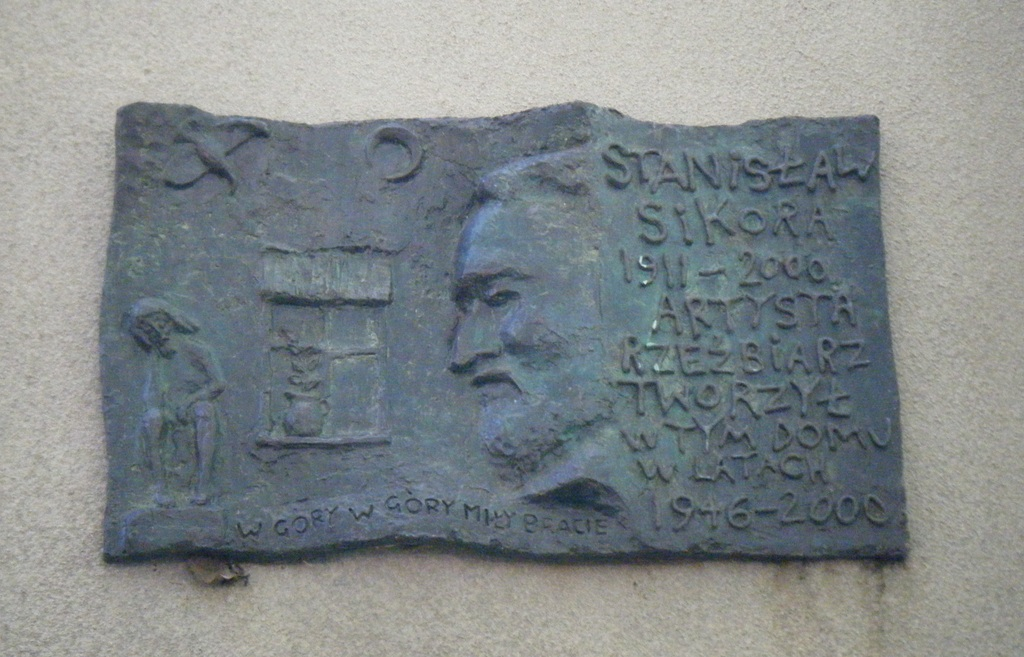
28/30 Obrońców Street: Commemorative plaque for Stanisław Sikora

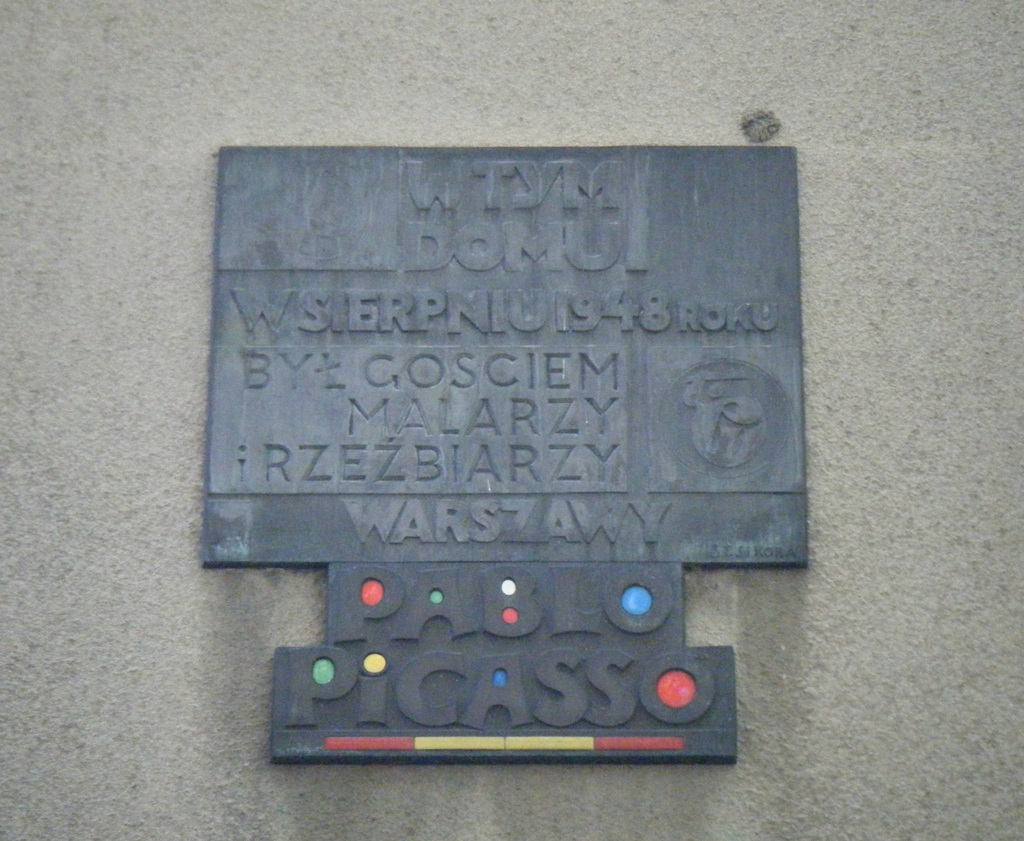
28/30 Obrońców Street: Commemorative plaque for Pablo Picasso

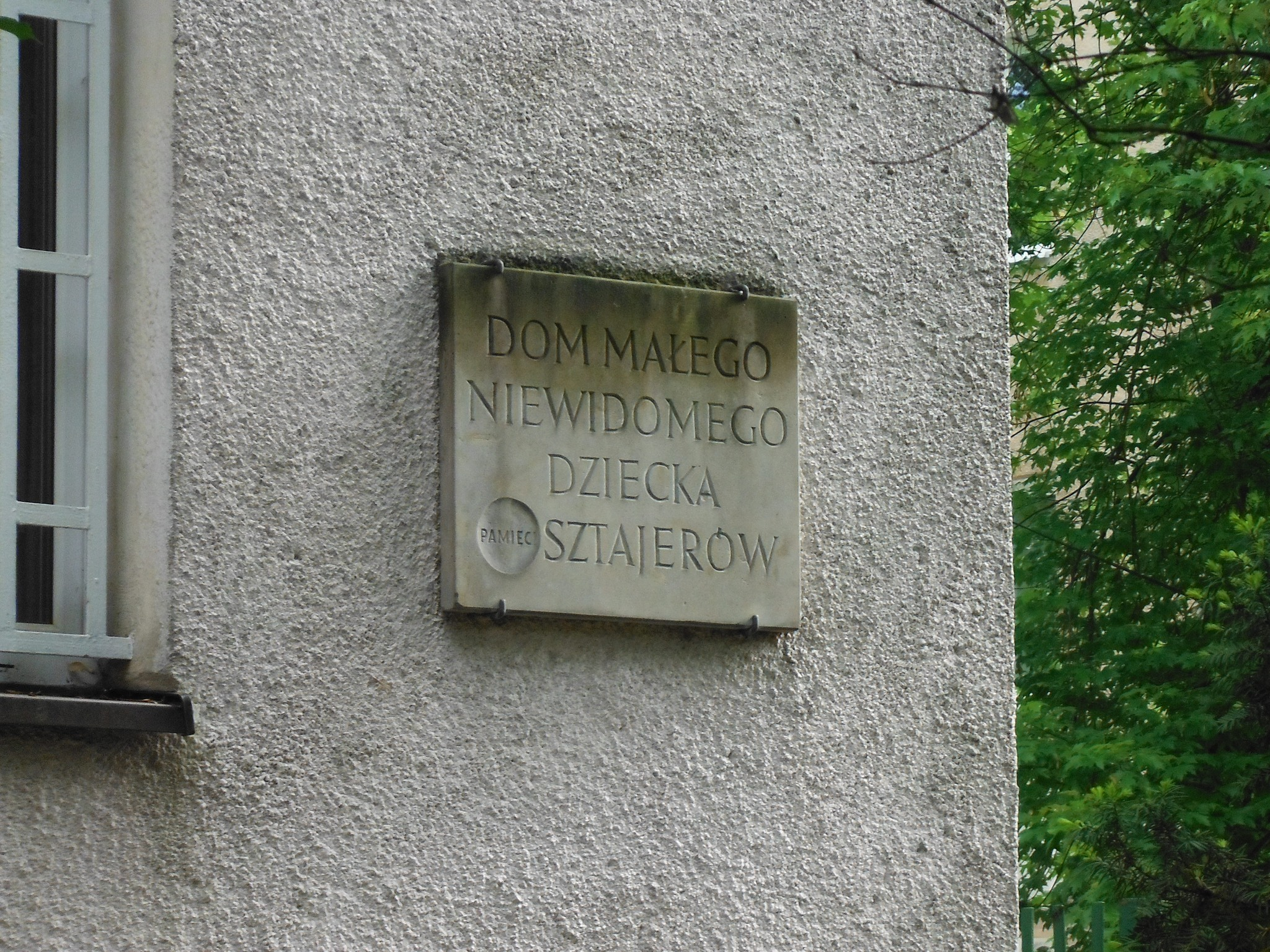
24 Obrońców Street: Commemorative plaque for Kazimierz Sztajer

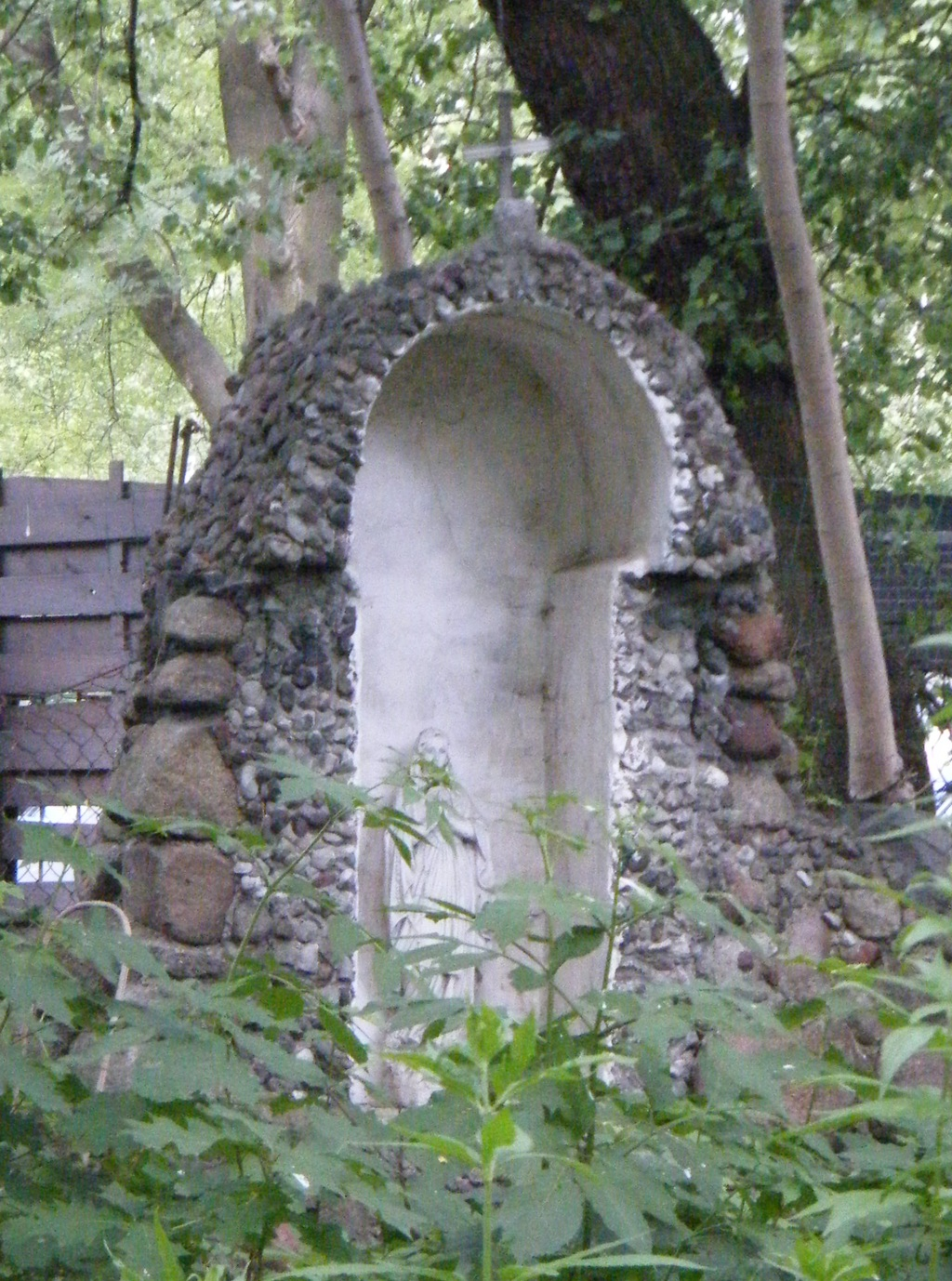
47/47A Obrońców Street: Statue of the Virgin Mary

== Bibliography ==
- Faryna-Paszkiewicz, Hanna (2001). Saska Kępa (in Polish). Warsaw: Murator. ISBN 83-915407-0-7.
