= Jerzy Jarnuszkiewicz =

Polish sculptor (1919–2005)

Jerzy Jarnuszkiewicz (27 February 1919 – 14 July 2005) was a Polish sculptor. His work was part of the painting event in the art competition at the 1948 Summer Olympics. Jarnuszkiewicz died in Warsaw on 14 July 2005, at the age of 86.
