= The Bather (Niewska) =

1929 sculpture by Olga Niewska

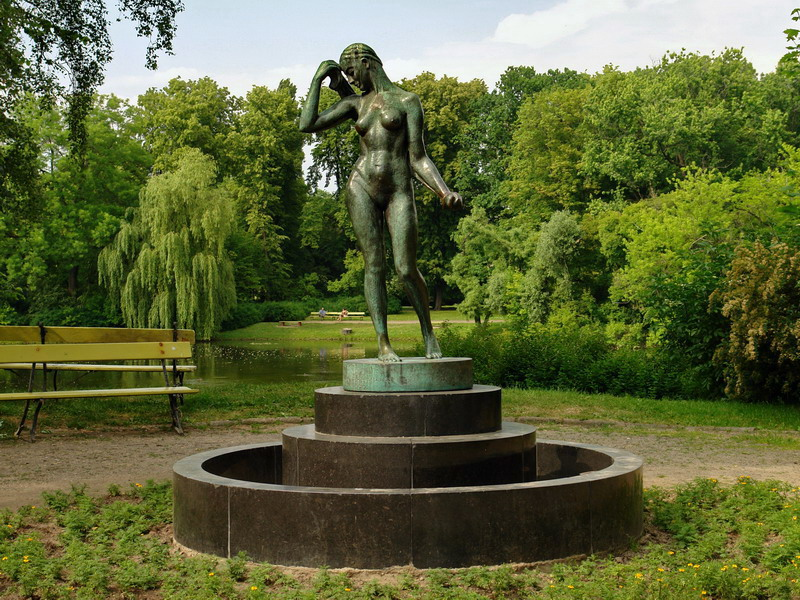
- The statue in 2006.
- Interactive map of The Bather
- Location: Skaryszew Park, Praga-South, Warsaw, Poland
- Coordinates: 52.242991°N 21.052446°E
- Designer: Olga Niewska
- Type: Statue
- Material: Bronze
- Height: 178 cm (70 in)
- Opening date: 28 September 1929

The Bather (Polish: Kąpiąca się) is a 1929 bronze statue by Olga Niewska, located in Warsaw, Poland. It is placed in the Skaryszew Park, within the neighbourhood of Saska Kępa in the district of Praga-South. It was unveiled on 28 September 1929. The sculpture depicts a nude bathing woman.

== History ==
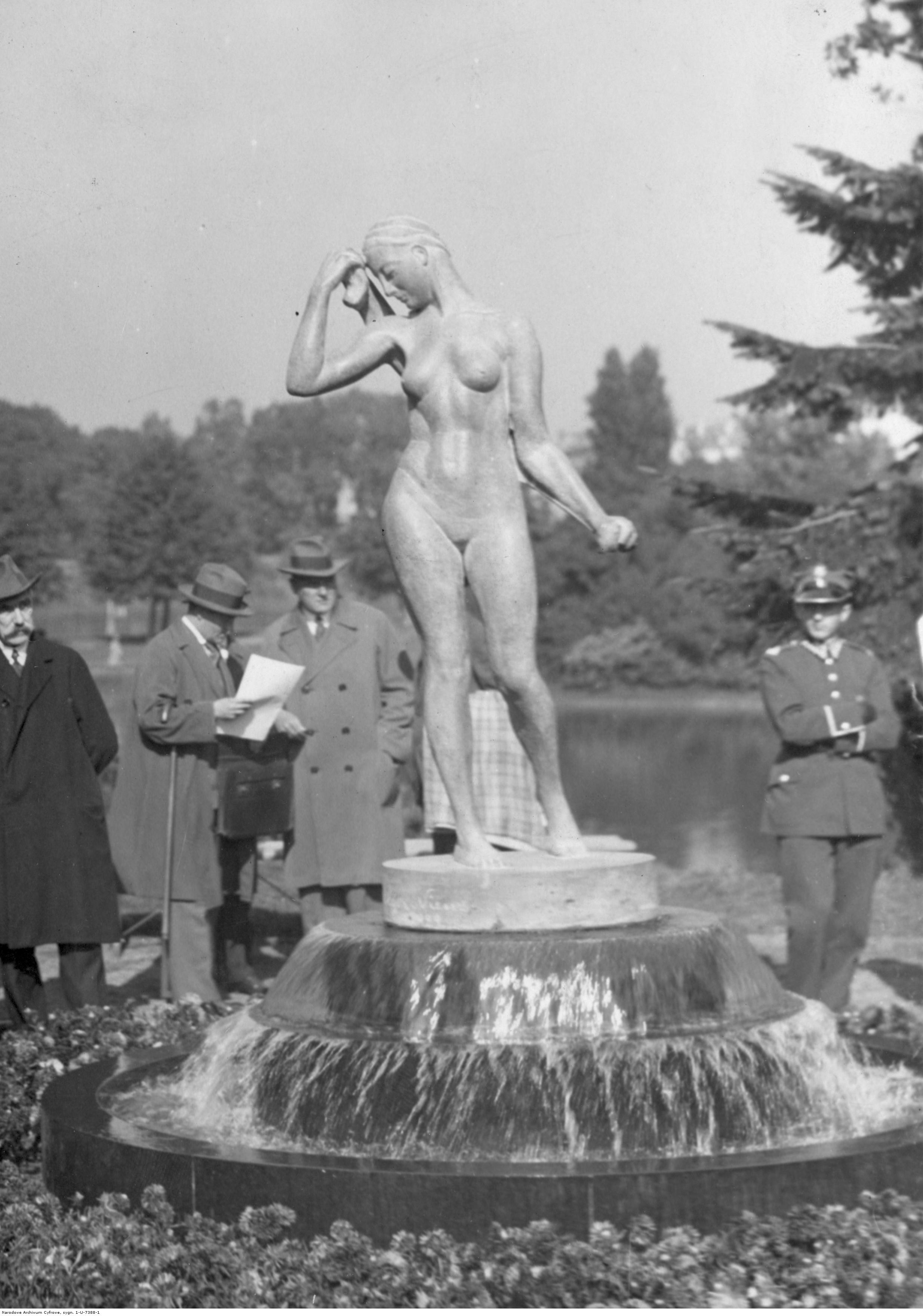
The sculpture in 1929 upon unveiling.

The sculpture was designed by Olga Niewska. Its prototype made out of gypsum was presented in November 1928 at the art exhibition of the Professional Polish Visual Artists Association, where it received the Award of the Capital City of Warsaw.

The statue was cast in bronze in the Bracia Łopieńscy metal works in Warsaw. It was unveiled in the Skaryszew Park on 28 September 1929, by the city mayor Zygmunt Słomiński.

On 30 January 1997, there was a failed attempt at stealing the sculpture during which it was damaged.

== Characteristics ==
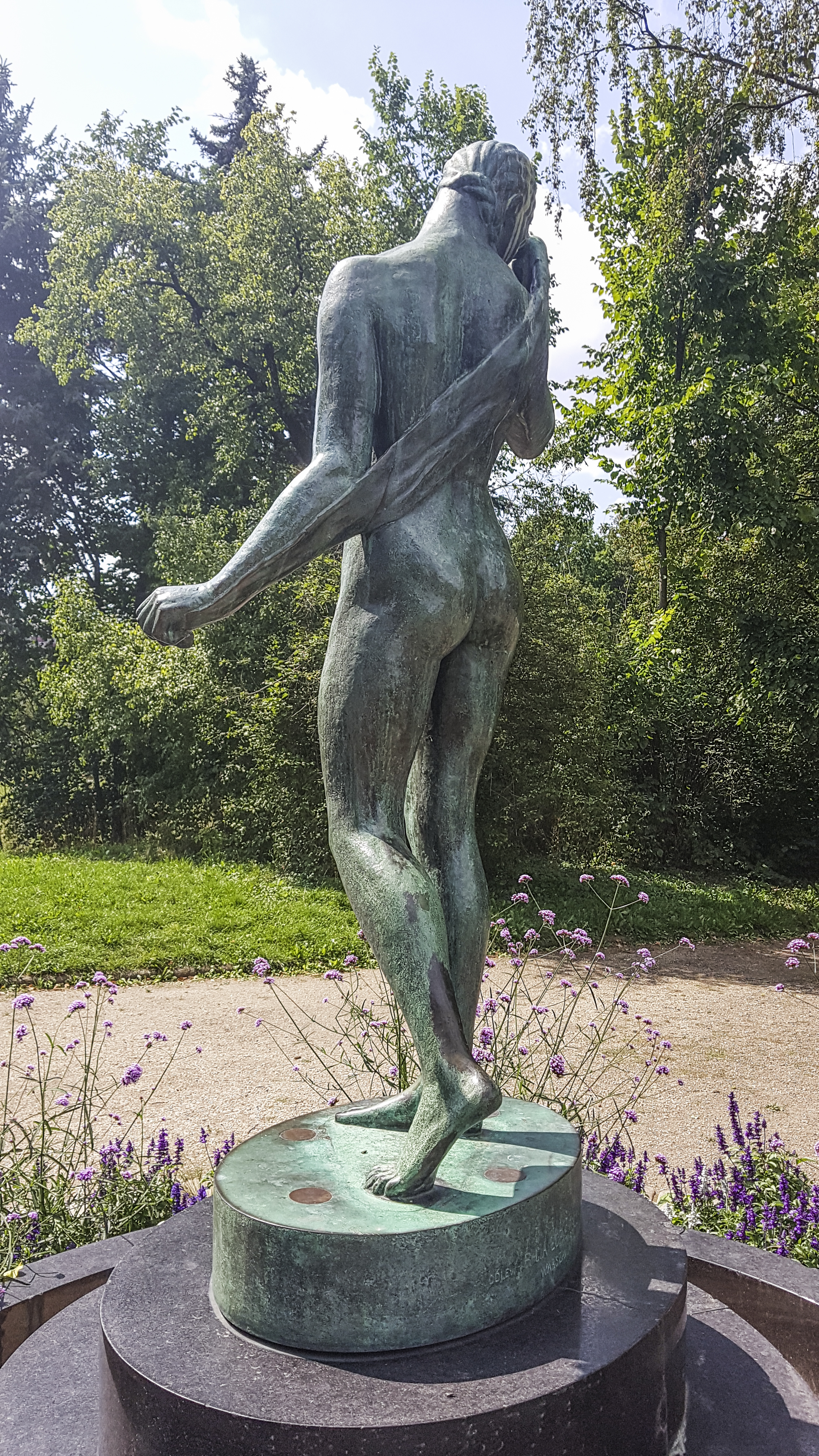
The back of the sculpture.

The sculpture is placed in the Skaryszew Park, on a small hill next to the Western Pond. It is located within the neighbourhood of Saska Kępa in the district of Praga-South. It is a bronze statue of a bathing woman. She is depicted nude in a standing position, with her head tilted to the right and slightly back, and using a towel, held in two hands, to dry her back. The statue is 1.78-metre-tall, and weights 500 kg. It is placed on top of a small fountain with circular base.
