= The Dancing Girl (sculpture in Warsaw) =

1927 sculpture by Stanisław Jackowski

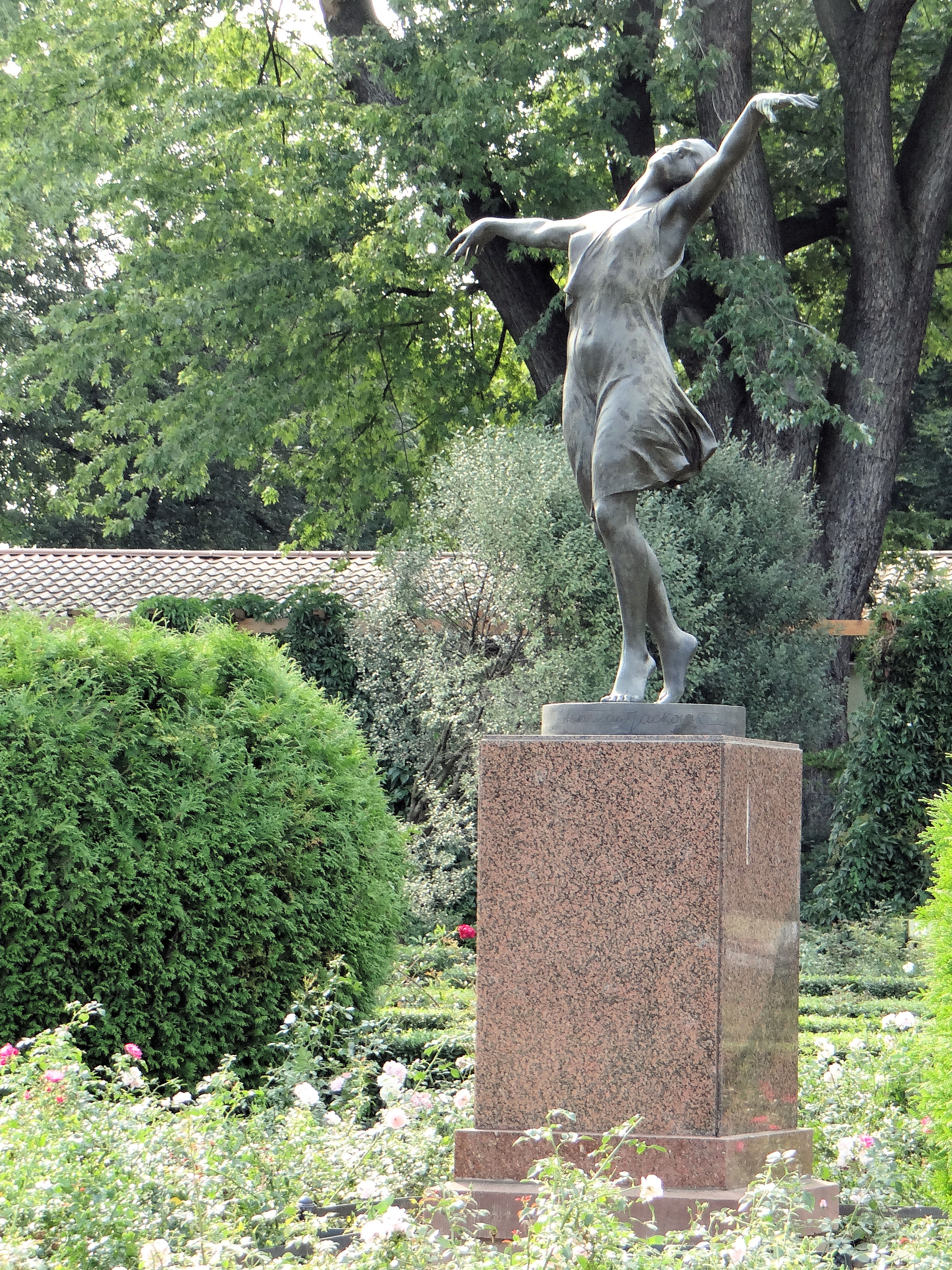
- The statue in 2014.
- Interactive map of The Dancing Girl
- Location: Skaryszew Park, Praga-South, Warsaw, Poland
- Coordinates: 52.244031°N 21.050529°E
- Designer: Stanisław Jackowski
- Type: Statue
- Material: Bronze
- Height: 165 cm (65 in)
- Opening date: 6 August 1927

The Dancing Girl (Polish: Tancerka) is a 1927 bronze statue by Stanisław Jackowski, located in Warsaw, Poland. It is placed in the Skaryszew Park, within the neighbourhood of Saska Kępa in the district of Praga-South. It was unveiled on 6 August 1927. The sculpture depicts a female dancer.

== History ==
The sculpture was designed by Stanisław Jackowski. It was cast from bronze in the Bracia Łopieńscy metal workshops in Warsaw, Poland. The artist based it on the dancer Halina Schmolz who posed for him. The Dancing Girl was unveiled on 6 August 1927 in the Skaryszew Park in Warsaw, by the city mayor Zygmunt Słomiński. It was the first sculpture in the park. It was renovated in 2006 and 2017.

== Characteristics ==
The sculpture is placed in the centre of a rose garden in Skaryszew Park, within the neighbourhood of Saska Kępa in the district of Praga-South. It is a bronze statue depicting a female dancer in an extatic dance pose. She stands on her toes, have her arms raised above the torso, with relaxed hands, and her head is tilted to the back and upwards, and is facing to the left. She is wearing a light dress with her left breast exposed. Her likeness was based on dancer Halina Szmolcówna who posed for the work. The statue has the height of 165 cm, and weights 235 kg. It is placed on a tall stone pedestal.
