= Statue of Edward Mandell House =

Monument in Warsaw, Poland

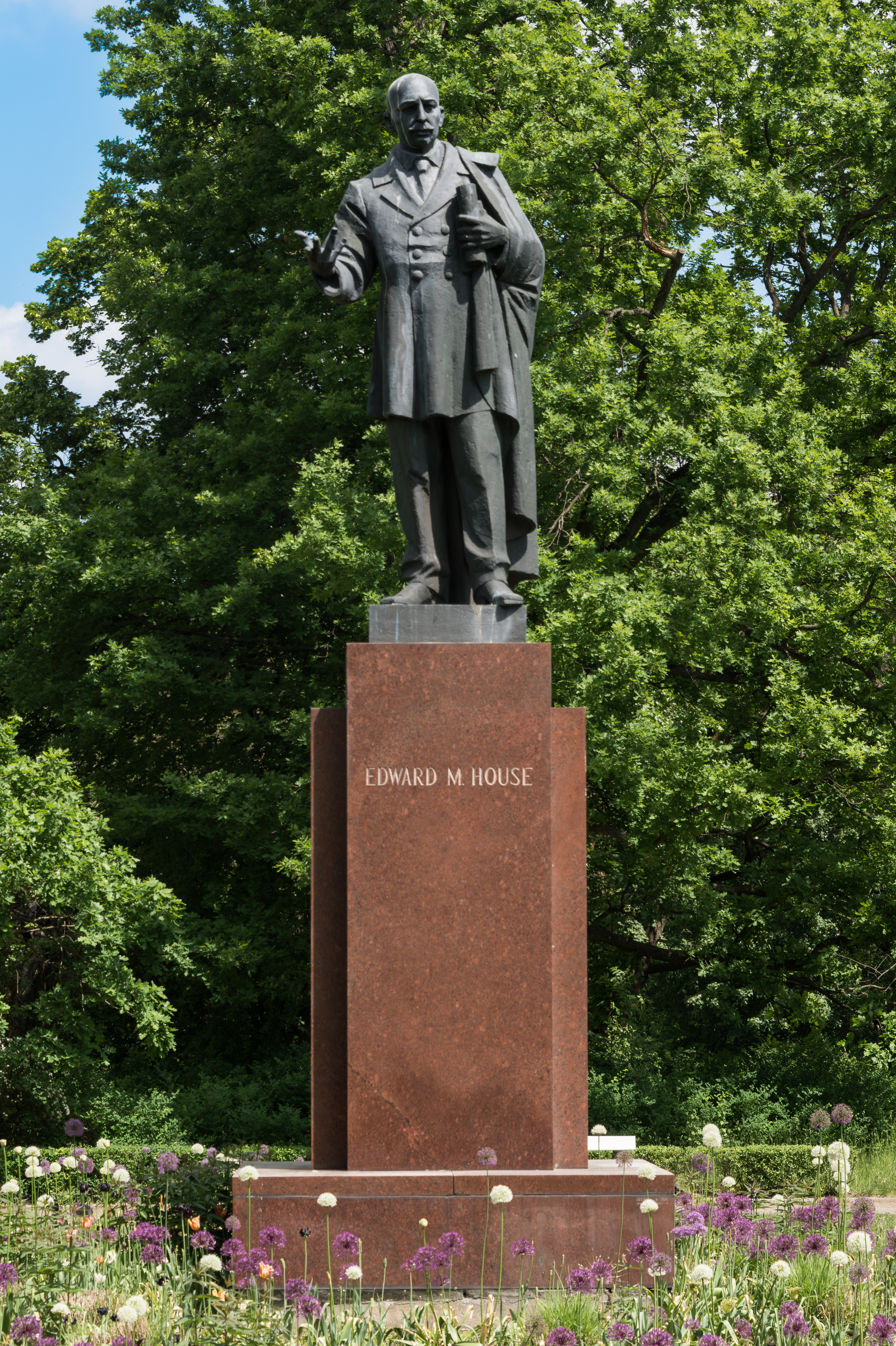
- The monument in 2026.
- Interactive map of Statue of Edward Mandell House
- Location: Skaryszew Park, Praga-South, Warsaw, Poland
- Coordinates: 52°14′31.35″N 21°03′08.66″E
- Designer: François Black (original); Marian Konieczny (replica)
- Type: Statue
- Material: Gunmetal (original); Bronze, granite (replica)
- Height: 10 m (original); 8 m (replica)
- Opening date: 4 July 1932
- Restored date: 11 November 1991
- Dedicated to: Edward M. House
- Dismantled date: c. 1951

The statue of Edward Mandell House (Polish: Pomnik Edwarda Mandella House’a) is a bronze statue in Warsaw, Poland, in the district of Praga-South placed in the Skaryszew Park. It depicts Edward M. House, a 20th-century diplomat, and advisor to the President of the United States, Woodrow Wilson, who helped in outlining his Fourteen Points. The monument was originally made by François Black, and unveiled on 4 July 1932. It was destroyed around 1951, and its replica, made by Marian Konieczny, was unveiled on 11 November 1991.

== History ==
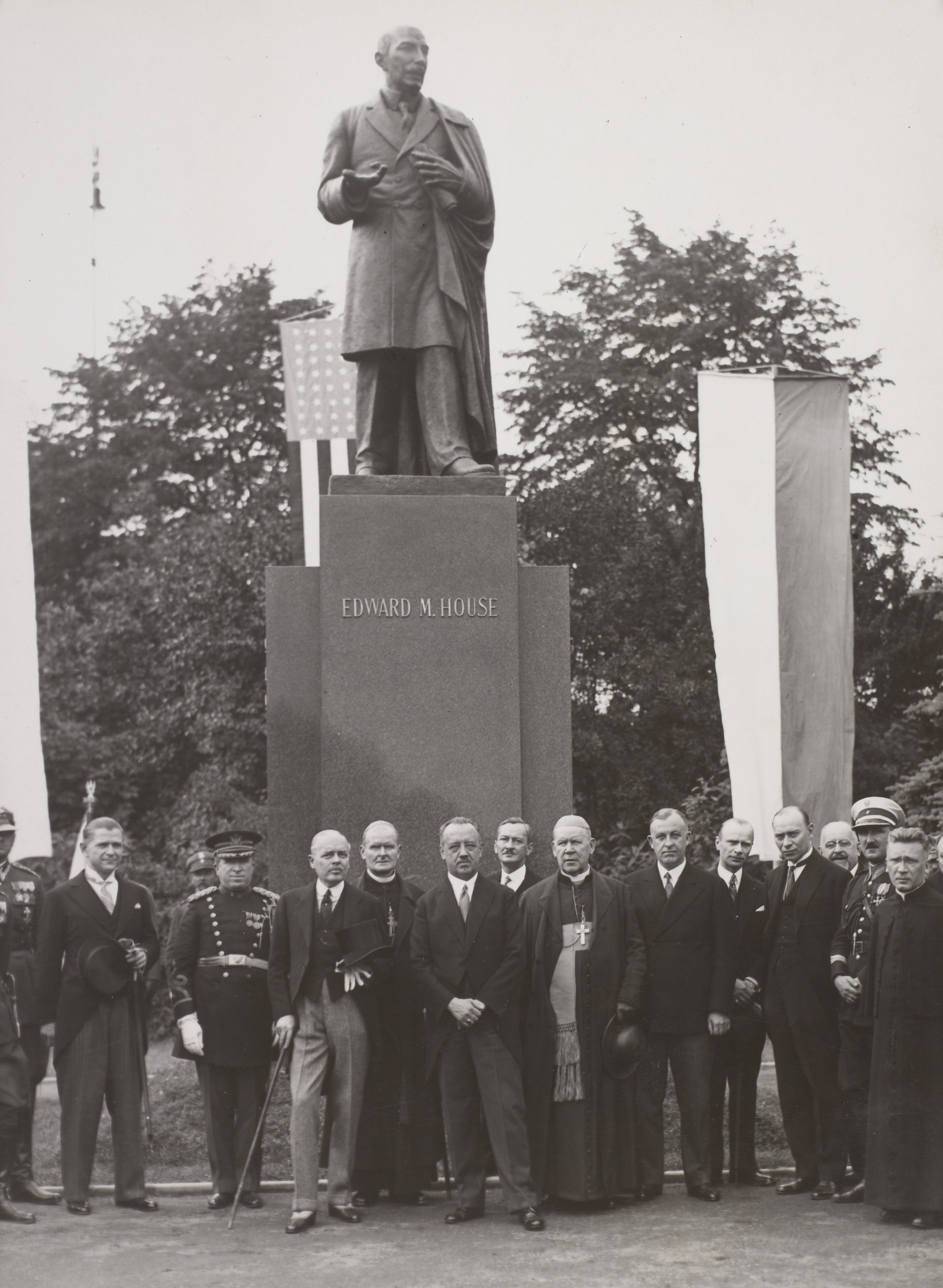
The unveiling of the monument, 1932

The monument was financed by Ignacy Jan Paderewski, and dedicated to Edward M. House, a 20th-century diplomat, and advisor to the President of the United States, Woodrow Wilson. He helped Wilson outline his Fourteen Points, including provisions about reinstatement of Poland as an independent country. The monument was designed by François Black, made out of gunmetal, and was 10-metre-tall. It was unveiled on 4 July 1932, Independence Day in the United States. The monument was originally placed in the Skaryszew Park, next to Zieleniecka Avenue.

The monument was demolished around 1951 as a result of political controversy. Reconstruction was proposed by architect Feliks Ptaszyński, the conservator-restorer of Warsaw. The replica was made by sculptor Marian Konieczny, basing on archival photographies. Unlike original, it was made out of bronze and was 8-metres-tall. The monument was unveiled at a different location within the park, on 11 November 1991, on the National Independence Day of Poland.

== Characteristics ==
The monument is placed in the Skaryszew Park, located within the district of Praga-South. It consists of a bronze statue depending Edward M. House, with his left hand holding a scroll near his chest, and his right hand reaching out. It is placed on a pedestal made out of red granite. The total height of the monument is 8 m. The pedestal has the following inscriptions on it:

Front

Edward M. House

Left side

Pułkownik Edward M. House
1858 – 1938
Mąż stanu USA
Przyjaciel Polski
Pomnik ufundowany przez Ignacego Jana Padarewskiego w 1932 r.
Zniszczony około 1951 r.
Odbudowany w 1991 r. wspólnym wysiłkiem Polaków w kraju i U.S.A.

[Colonel Edward M. House
1858–1938
United States statesman, friend of Poland. The monument was financed by Ignacy Jan Paderewski in 1932. It was destroyed around 1951, and rebuild in 1991, in a joined effort of Poles in the country and in the United States]

Right side

Szlachetnemu rzecznikowi sprawy polskiej

[To a noble spokesman of the Polish cause]
