= The Bather =

The Bather may refer to:

- The Bather (Etty), or Musidora: The Bather 'At the Doubtful Breeze Alarmed', four separate oil paintings, completed 1843–1846, by William Etty
- The Bather (Niewska), a 1929 bronze statue by Olga Niewska in Warsaw, Poland
- The Bather (Mauro), a 1997 bronze statue by Gary Mauro on the campus of Saint Louis University, Missouri, U.S.

== See also ==
- The Bathers (disambiguation)
