= Edward M. House =

American diplomat (1858–1938)

Colonel Edward M. House
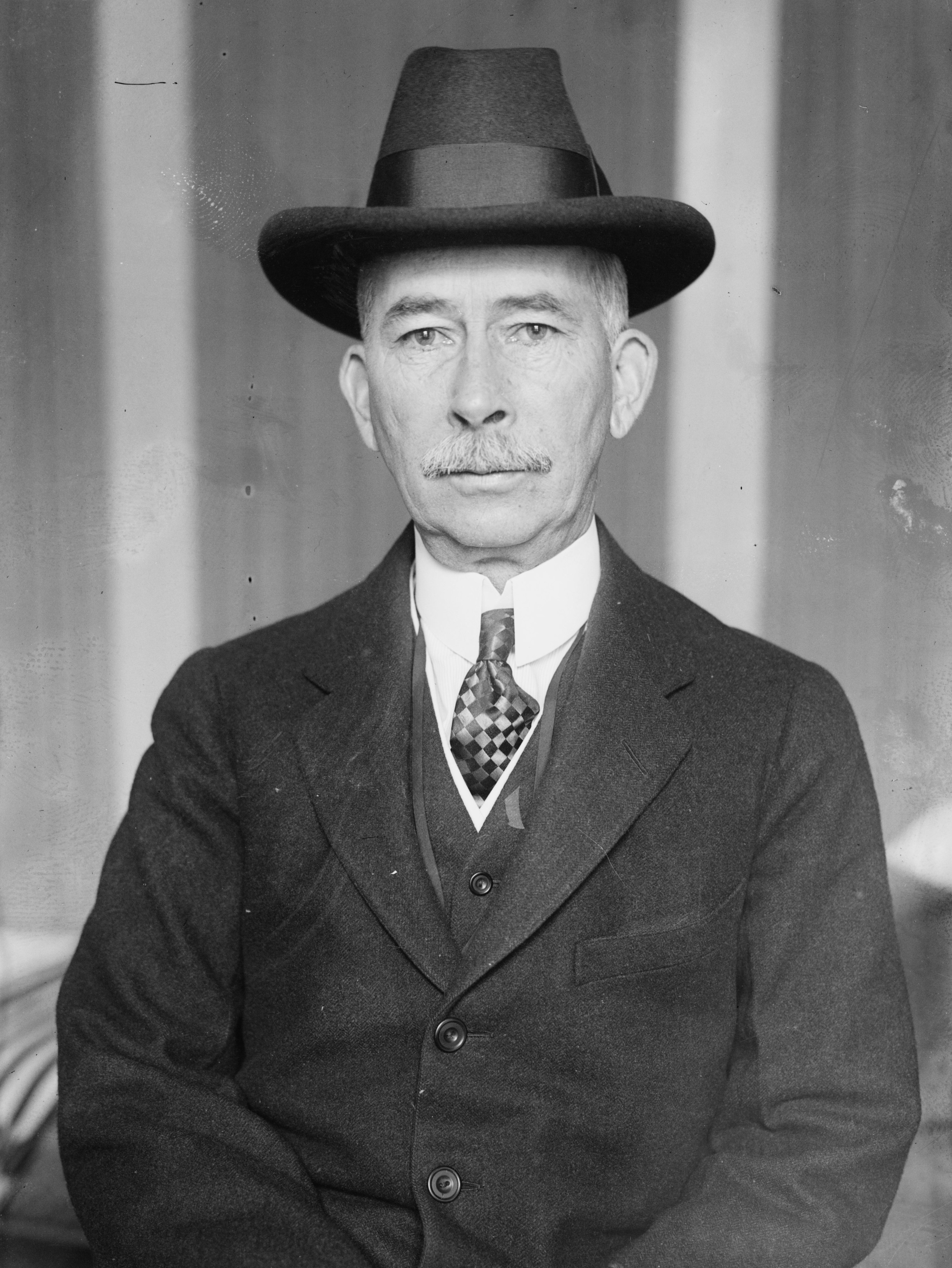
- House in 1915
- Born: Edward Mandell House; July 26, 1858; Houston, Texas, U.S.
- Died: March 28, 1938 (aged 79); Manhattan, New York City, U.S.
- Resting place: Glenwood Cemetery in Houston, Texas
- Education: Cornell University
- Political party: Democratic
- Spouse: Loulie Hunter (m. 1881)
- Children: 2
- Parents: Mary Elizabeth (Shearn) House; Thomas William House Sr.

Edward Mandell House (July 26, 1858 – March 28, 1938) was an American diplomat, and an adviser to President Woodrow Wilson. He was known as Colonel House, although his title was honorary and he had performed no military service. He was a highly influential backroom politician in Texas before becoming a key supporter of the presidential bid of Wilson in 1912 by managing his campaign, beginning in July 1911. Having a self-effacing manner, he did not hold office but was an "executive agent", Wilson's chief adviser on European politics and diplomacy during World War I (1914–1918). He became a government official as one of the five American commissioners to the Paris Peace Conference of 1919. In 1919, Wilson broke with House and many other top advisers, believing they had deceived him at Paris. Despite his influence, House remains a controversial figure, criticized for operating behind the scenes without accountability, for his role in the flawed postwar settlement, and for promoting a technocratic, anti-democratic vision of governance.

== Early years ==
He was born July 26, 1858, in Houston, Texas, the last of seven children of Mary Elizabeth (Shearn) and Thomas William House Sr. His father was an emigrant from England by way of New Orleans, who became a prominent Houston businessman, with a large role in developing the city and served a term as its mayor. His father sent ships laden with cotton to evade the Union blockade in the Gulf of Mexico during the American Civil War. He traded Texas cotton through Matamoros, Mexico, in exchange for equipment and ammunition.

As a young man, House and his companions harassed recently freed slaves verbally and with slingshots. His diary entries "consistently reveal a deeply felt racism" and a belief in white supremacy.

House attended Houston Academy, a school in Bath, England, a prep school in Virginia, and Hopkins Grammar School, New Haven, Connecticut. He went on to study at Cornell University in Ithaca, New York, in 1877 where he was a member of the Alpha Delta Phi fraternity. He left at the beginning of his third year to care for his sick father, who died in 1880.

He married Loulie Hunter on August 4, 1881.

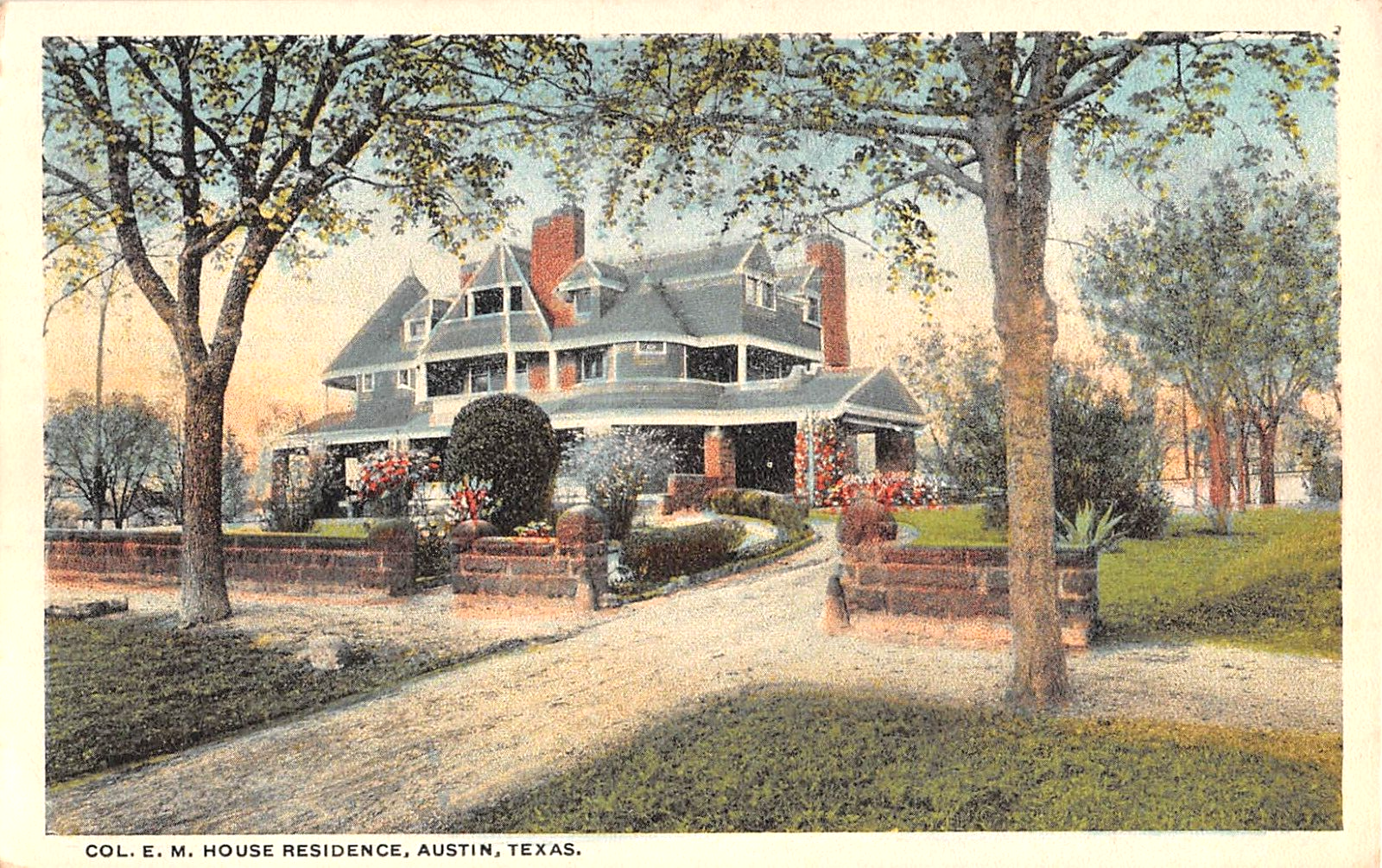
Edward Mandell House Mansion, on an Abe Frank postcard, postmarked in April 1920

In 1892, he built a residence in Austin, designed by the architect Frank Freeman, that came to be known as Edward Mandell House Mansion. After being used by the University of Texas, it was demolished in 1967.

== Texas business and politics ==
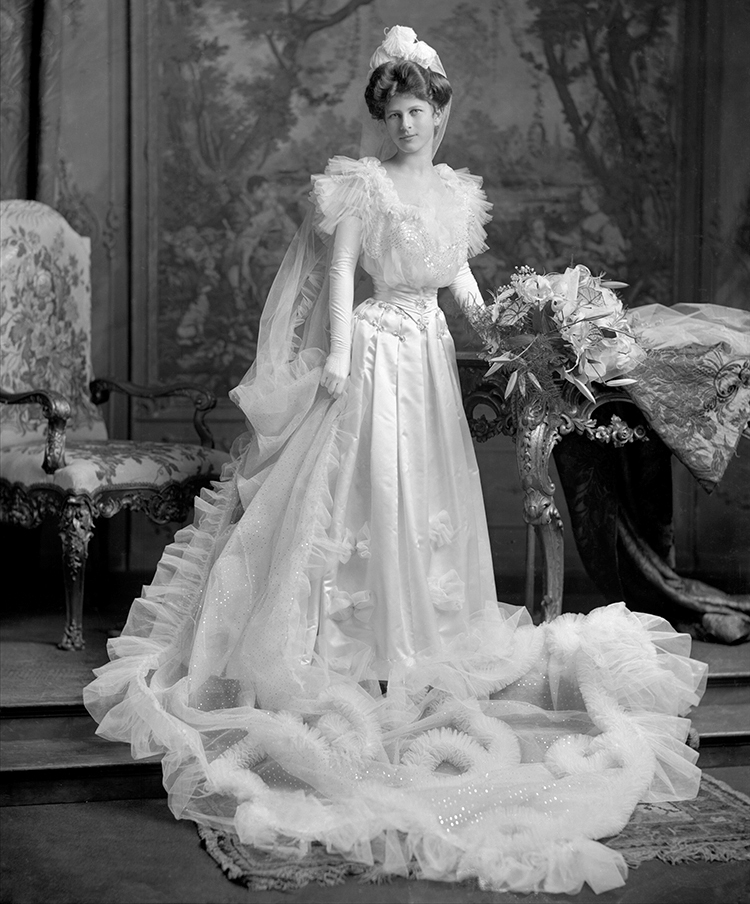
Photograph of his daughter, Mona House, later Mrs. Randolph F. Tucker, on 22 June 1904 when she was presented to Court by Mrs. Choate, wife of the United States Ambassador

On his return to Texas, House ran his family's business. He eventually sold the cotton plantations, and invested in banking. He was a founder of the Trinity and Brazos Valley Railway.

House helped to make four men governor of Texas: James S. Hogg (1892), Charles A. Culberson (1894), Joseph D. Sayers (1898), and S. W. T. Lanham (1902). After their elections, House acted as unofficial adviser to each. In 1893, Hogg appointed House to his military staff with the rank of lieutenant colonel, a position which came with a title but no actual military responsibilities. He was reappointed by Culberson, Sayers, and Lanham, and was soon known as "Colonel House", the title which he used for the rest of his career.

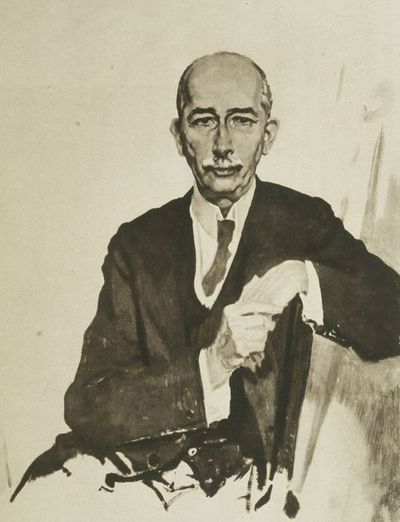
Edward M. House, from An Onlooker in France 1917–1919 by William Orpen, 1921. Plate LXXXV

House moved to New York City about 1902. A "cosmopolitan progressive" who examined political developments in Europe, House was an admirer of the British Liberal welfare reforms instigated between 1906 and 1914, noting to a friend in June 1911 that David Lloyd George

is working out the problems which are nearest my heart and that is the equalization of opportunity ... . The income tax, the employers' liability act, the old age pension measure, the budget of last year and this insurance bill puts England well to the fore. We have touched these problems in America but lightly as yet but the soil is fallow.

House's friend David F. Houston shared his interests in England and the continent, concluding in August 1911 that “England and Germany are doing many interesting things in a desirable socialistic direction. We shall follow slowly because of the newness of conditions here and the lack of pressure.”

In 1912, House anonymously published a novel called Philip Dru: Administrator, in which the title character leads the democratic western U.S. states in a civil war against plutocratic eastern U.S. states. Becoming a dictator, through gradual amelioration of social ills, through progressive taxation, universal suffrage, and reform of the country's laws and its national constitution, he moves the U.S. toward a “socialism as dreamed of by Karl Marx”. Dru's reforms resemble the "Bull Moose" policy platform of 1912.

== Adviser to Wilson ==
After House withdrew from Texas politics and moved to New York, he became an adviser, close friend and supporter of New Jersey governor Woodrow Wilson in 1911, and helped him win the Democratic presidential nomination and the presidential election in 1912. He became an intimate of Wilson and helped set up his administration.

House was offered the cabinet position of his choice (except for Secretary of State, which was already pledged to William Jennings Bryan) but declined, choosing instead "to serve wherever and whenever possible". House was even provided living quarters within the White House.

He continued as an adviser to Wilson particularly in the area of foreign affairs. House functioned as Wilson's chief negotiator in Europe during the negotiations for peace (1917–1919) and as chief deputy for Wilson at the Paris Peace Conference.

In the 1916 presidential election, House declined any public role but was Wilson's top campaign adviser: "he planned its structure; set its tone; guided its finance; chose speakers, tactics, and strategy; and, not least, handled the campaign's greatest asset and greatest potential liability: its brilliant but temperamental candidate."

After Wilson's first wife died in 1914, the President was even closer to House. However, Wilson's second wife, Edith, disliked House, and his position weakened. It is believed that her personal animosity was significantly responsible for Wilson's eventual decision to break with House.

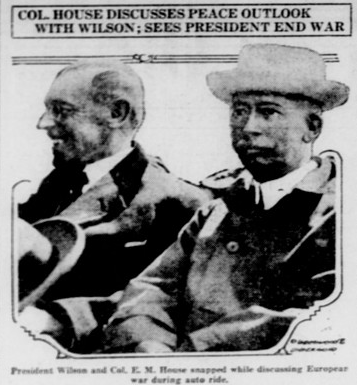
Col. House and President Wilson in 1915.

== Diplomacy ==
House threw himself into world affairs, promoting Wilson's goal of brokering a peace to end World War I. He spent much of 1915 and 1916 in Europe, trying to negotiate peace through diplomacy. He was enthusiastic but lacked deep insight into European affairs and relied on the information received from British diplomats, especially the British foreign secretary Edward Grey, to shape his outlook. Nicholas Ferns argues that Grey's ideas meshed with House's. Grey's diplomatic goal was to establish close Anglo-American relations; he deliberately built a close connection to further that aim. Thereby Grey re-enforced House's pro-Allied proclivities so that Wilson's chief adviser promoted the British position.

After a German U-boat sank the British passenger liner Lusitania on May 7, 1915, with 128 Americans among the 1198 dead, many Americans called for war. Prior to departure from New York, the Imperial German Embassy had announced that ships sailing into warzone waters in order to aim for Germany's enemies would be targeted as enemy supply. The ship was carrying war munitions, although this was not publicly revealed at the time. Wilson demanded that Germany respect American neutral rights, and especially not sink merchant ships or passenger liners without giving the passengers and crew the opportunity to get into lifeboats, as required by international law. Tension escalated with Germany, until Germany agreed to Wilson's terms. House felt that the war was an epic battle between democracy and autocracy; he argued the United States ought to help Britain and France win a limited Allied victory. However, Wilson still insisted on neutrality.

House played a major role in shaping wartime diplomacy. He supported as well Thomas Garrigue Masaryk’s Czechoslovak legions, especially in Russia. Wilson had House assemble "The Inquiry", a team of academic experts to devise efficient postwar solutions to all the world's problems. In September 1918, Wilson gave House the responsibility for preparing a constitution for a League of Nations. In October 1918, when Germany petitioned for peace based on the Fourteen Points, Wilson charged House with working out details of an armistice with the Allies.

Diplomat and historian Philip Zelikow argues that House's actions and advice to Wilson in the 1916-1917 period significantly extended World War I. At a time when both the Allies and Central Powers were anxious to begin peace talks, House often misread and misled Wilson, as well as his contacts in Britain and Germany, about each others' intentions and conditions for peace. This led Wilson to crucially delay offers to initiate a peace conference, and eventually fumble the diplomatic procedures necessary to make such an offer. While it is unclear if these mistakes were caused simply by House's lack of diplomatic experience or were instead intentional misdirects intended to protect House's own social standing, Zelikow argues that this failure of diplomacy was a primary reason for Wilson's eventual break with House following the end of the war.

House's perspective, as reflected in his personal papers, differs. House traveled in Europe to explore the possibility of peace as Wilson's unofficial agent. House was dismayed by German militarism, which he believed the main cause of the war, but also by the hardened self-interest of each of the warring nations which included territorial aspirations, as well as Britain's fear of Germany's challenge to their military power, in particular naval primacy. The belligerents in the grip of war fever considered even discussing a peace conference a show of weakness; rejected automatically any proposal their enemy favored. Wilson's hopeful call for a reasonable, practical "peace without victory" backfired; angered the French and English fighting for Germany's utter and decisive defeat. Soldiers started calling dud shells "Wilsons." The efforts to offer American mediation foundered not for lack of trying, but because the intransigent warring nations were not ready for peace—this, according to House's contemporaneous correspondence. Then Germany's decision to resume unrestrained submarine attacks against vessels of neutral nations, together with the Zimmermann telegram offering a German-Mexican alliance on the understanding Mexico would be assisted to reconquer New Mexico, Texas, and Arizona—precipitated Wilson's decision to ask Congress to declare that a state of war existed between Germany and the United States. But both Wilson and House viewed entering the war to end it not just as a necessity of national interest, but as a Progressive project for a better future. Mankind would reject militarism after the horrors of this war; out of it would come a League of Nations to team against any single nation that waged aggressive war. It was to be (they thought) the War to End All Wars.

Despite these idealistic goals, House's legacy remains controversial. His lack of formal office or public accountability, combined with the perception that he worked behind-the scenes, has led some historians to view him as an unelected power broker who operated through secrecy and manipulation. Critics have also argued that his mishandling of diplomatic initiatives-particularly at the Paris Peace Conference- contributed to a flawed postwar settlement that failed to ensure long-term peace in Europe. Furthermore, his vision of elite-driven global governance, as expressed in his novel Philip Dru: Administrator, has drawn criticism for its technocratic and anti-democratic content.

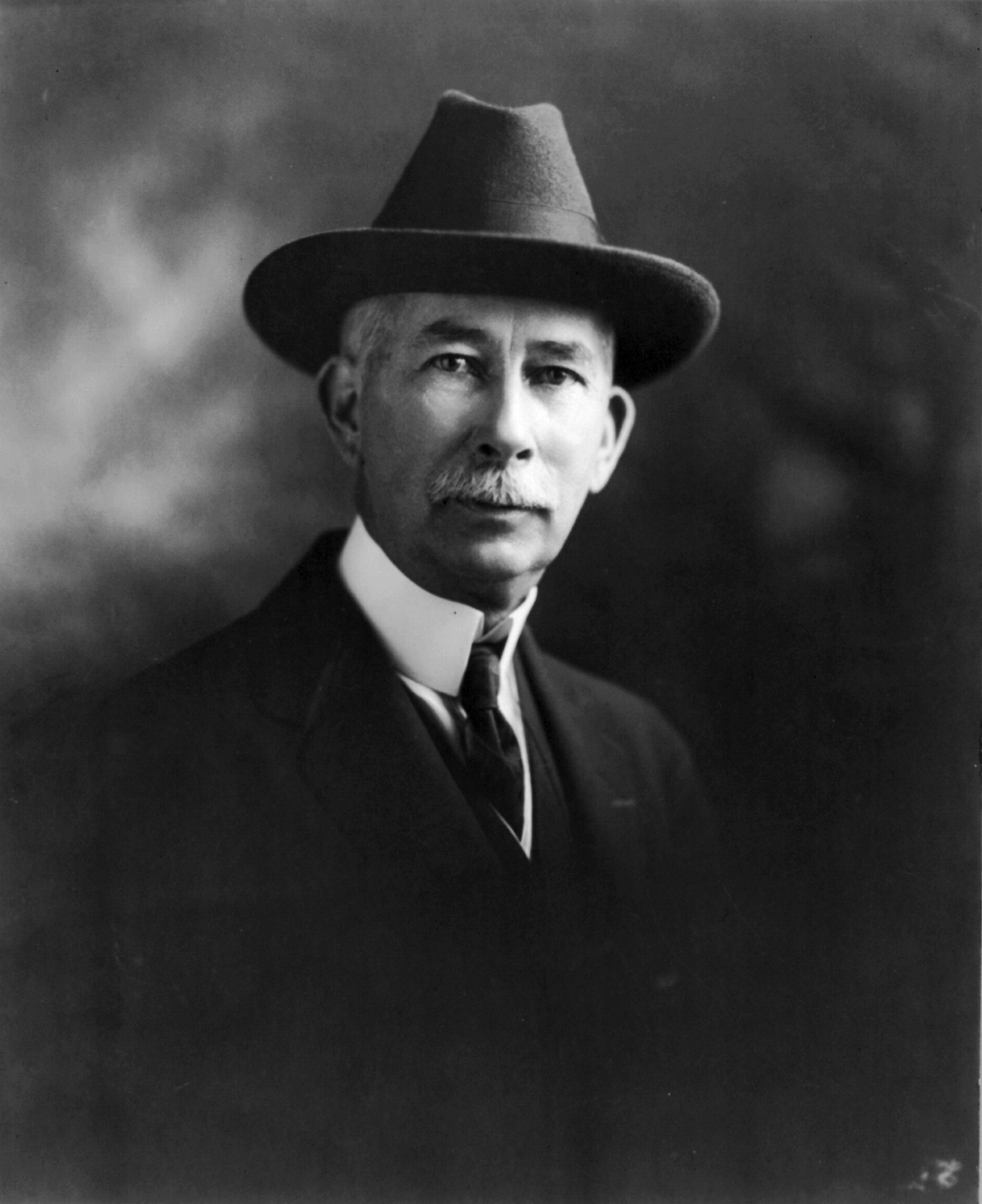
Edward M. House in 1920

== Paris conference ==
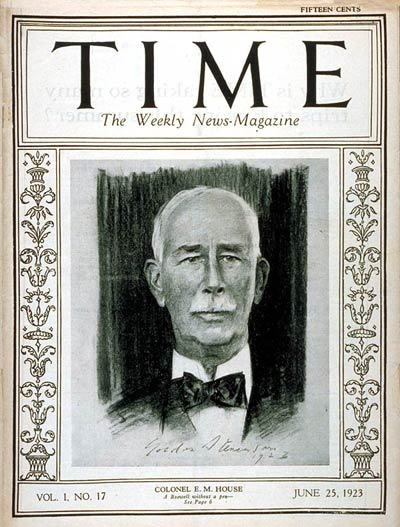
Time cover, June 25, 1923

House helped Wilson outline his Fourteen Points and worked with the president on the drafting of the Treaty of Versailles and the Covenant of the League of Nations. House served on the League of Nations Commission on Mandates with Lord Milner and Lord Robert Cecil of Great Britain, Henri Simon of France, Viscount Chinda of Japan, Guglielmo Marconi of Italy, and George Louis Beer as adviser. On May 30, 1919, House participated in a meeting in Paris which laid the groundwork for establishment of the Council on Foreign Relations (CFR), a private organization based in New York. Throughout 1919, House urged Wilson to work with Senator Henry Cabot Lodge to achieve ratification of the Versailles Treaty, but Wilson refused to deal with Lodge or any other senior Republican.

The conference revealed serious policy disagreements and personality conflicts between Wilson and House. Wilson became less tolerant and broke with his closest advisers, one after another. Later, he dismissed House's son-in-law, Gordon Auchincloss, from the American peace commission when it became known the young man was making derogatory comments about him.

In February 1919, House took his place on the Council of Ten, where he negotiated compromises unacceptable to Wilson. The following month, Wilson returned to Paris. He decided that House had taken too many liberties in negotiations, and relegated him to the sidelines. After they returned to the US later that year, the two men never saw or spoke to each other again. Shortly after returning to Washington, Wilson suffered a debilitating stroke, the extent of which was concealed from the public and the press. Other than his doctors, direct access to the president was now limited to and controlled by Wilson's wife and Chief of Staff. Though House continued to send memos and reports to the president during this time, Wilson's wife made sure he did not see any of them.

== Later years ==
In the 1920s, House strongly supported membership of both the League of Nations and the Permanent Court of International Justice.

In 1932, House supported Franklin D. Roosevelt for the presidency without joining his inner circle. Although he became disillusioned with the course of the New Deal after Roosevelt's election, he expressed his reservations only privately. House was a confidant of William E. Dodd, Roosevelt's first Ambassador to Nazi Germany, acting at times as Dodd's intermediary with the White House and the State Department.

== Death and legacy ==
House died on March 28, 1938, in Manhattan, New York City, following a bout of pleurisy. As a (one time) novelist, House had much more influence with the book Philip Dru: Administrator than has been appreciated. Historian Maxwell Bloomfield notes the impact of the character Dru, as written by Wilson's Secretary of the Interior. In his diary, Franklin K. Lane wrote the following:

Colonel House's book, Philip Dru, favors it, and all that book has said should be, comes about slowly, even woman suffrage. The President comes to Philip Dru in the end. And yet they say that House has no power....

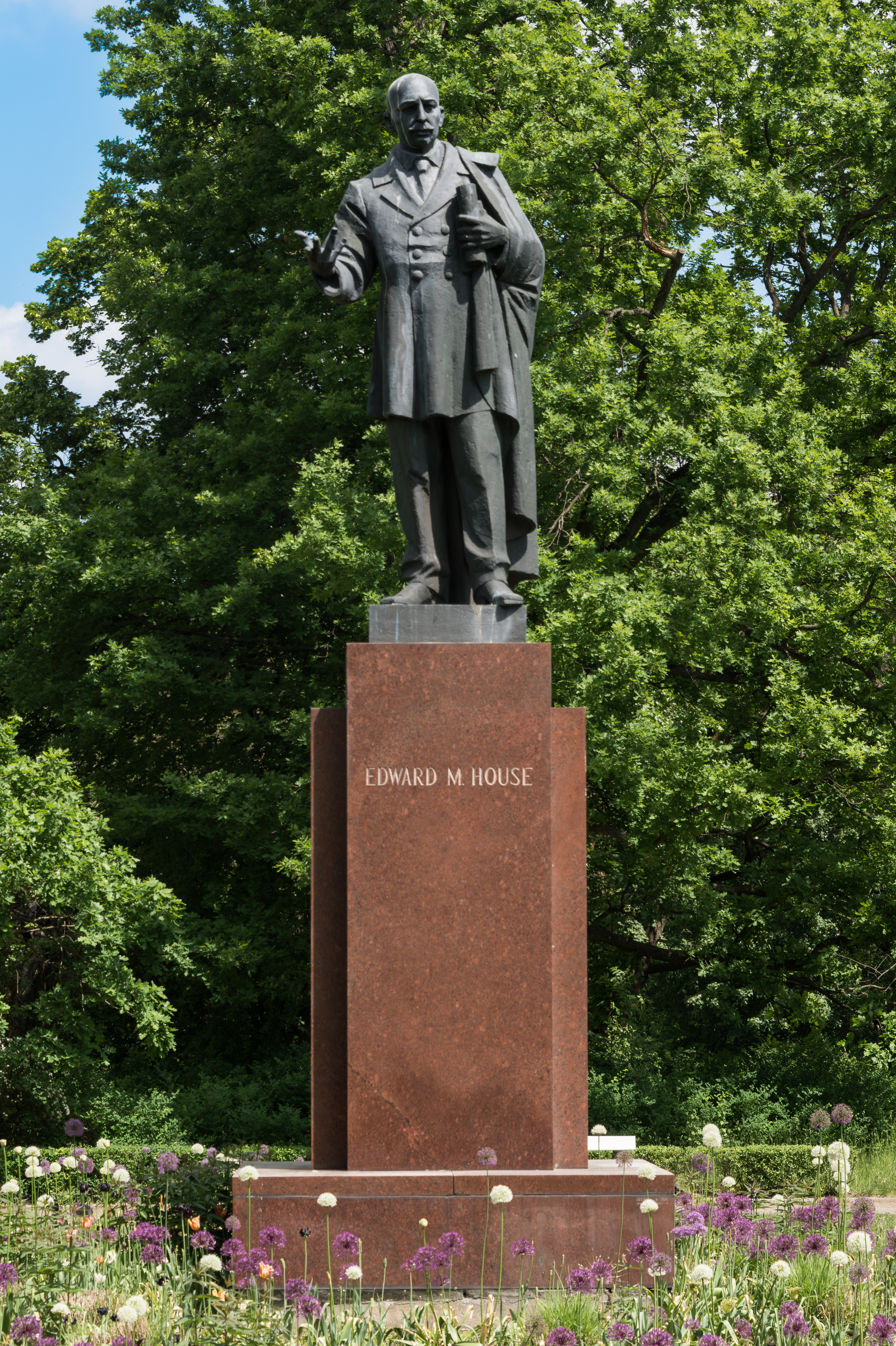
Edward Mandell House Monument in Warsaw

House was buried at Glenwood Cemetery in Houston. After his death, politicians, diplomats and statesman from around the United States, Canada and the United Kingdom expressed their admiration for House and regrets about his death, including President Franklin Delano Roosevelt, Cordell Hull, Fiorello LaGuardia, Al Smith, Mackenzie King, David Lloyd George, Lord Tyrrell, and Lord Robert Cecil.

House Park, a high school football stadium in Austin, Texas, stands on House's former horse pasture. The small farming community of Emhouse in north-central Navarro County, Texas, was renamed from Lyford in his honor, as he had served as the superintendent of the railroad company that operated in the community.

A statue of House, financed by Ignacy Jan Paderewski in 1932, is located at Skaryszewski Park in Warsaw. House is considered a hero in Poland for his advocacy of Polish independence after World War I, which was incorporated into the Fourteen Points and resulted in the reestablishment of the Polish state.

The World War II Liberty Ship SS Edward M. House was named in his honor.

== In popular culture ==
- In Darryl F. Zanuck's 1944 film Wilson, Charles Halton portrayed Colonel House.
- Colonel House was a major supporting character in Robert H. Pilpel's 1979 novel To the Honor of the Fleet which included the sinking of ocean liner Lusitania as an important plot point concerning the adventures of two U.S. Navy intelligence officers, each attached to either the British Royal Navy or the Imperial German Navy, prior to the Battle of Jutland and the American entry into the war.
- In rapper Ab-Soul's album, Control System, the outro to the song "Bohemian Grove" features a private meeting by House with President Wilson.

== Works ==
=== Articles ===
- "The Running Sands." Foreign Affairs, vol. 1, no. 4 (Jun. 15, 1923), pp. 1–8.
- "America in World Affairs: a Democratic View." Foreign Affairs, vol. 2, no. 4 (Jun. 15, 1924), pp. 530–551.
- "Some Foreign Problems of the Next Administration." Foreign Affairs, vol. 11, no. 2 (Jan. 1933), pp. 211–219.

=== Books ===
- Philip Dru: Administrator: A Story of Tomorrow, 1920-1935. New York: B.W. Huebsch, 1912.
- What Really Happened at Paris: The Story of the Peace Conference, 1918–1919, with Charles Seymour. New York: Charles Scribner's Sons, 1921.
- Charles Seymour (ed.), The Intimate Papers of Colonel House. In 4 volumes. Boston: Houghton Mifflin Co., 1928.

== See also ==
- American Commission to Negotiate Peace
- Federal Reserve

Awards and achievements
Preceded by Burton K. Wheeler	Cover of Time magazine June 25, 1923	Succeeded by Andrew Mellon
