= Statue of Jan Kiliński =

Monument in Warsaw, Poland

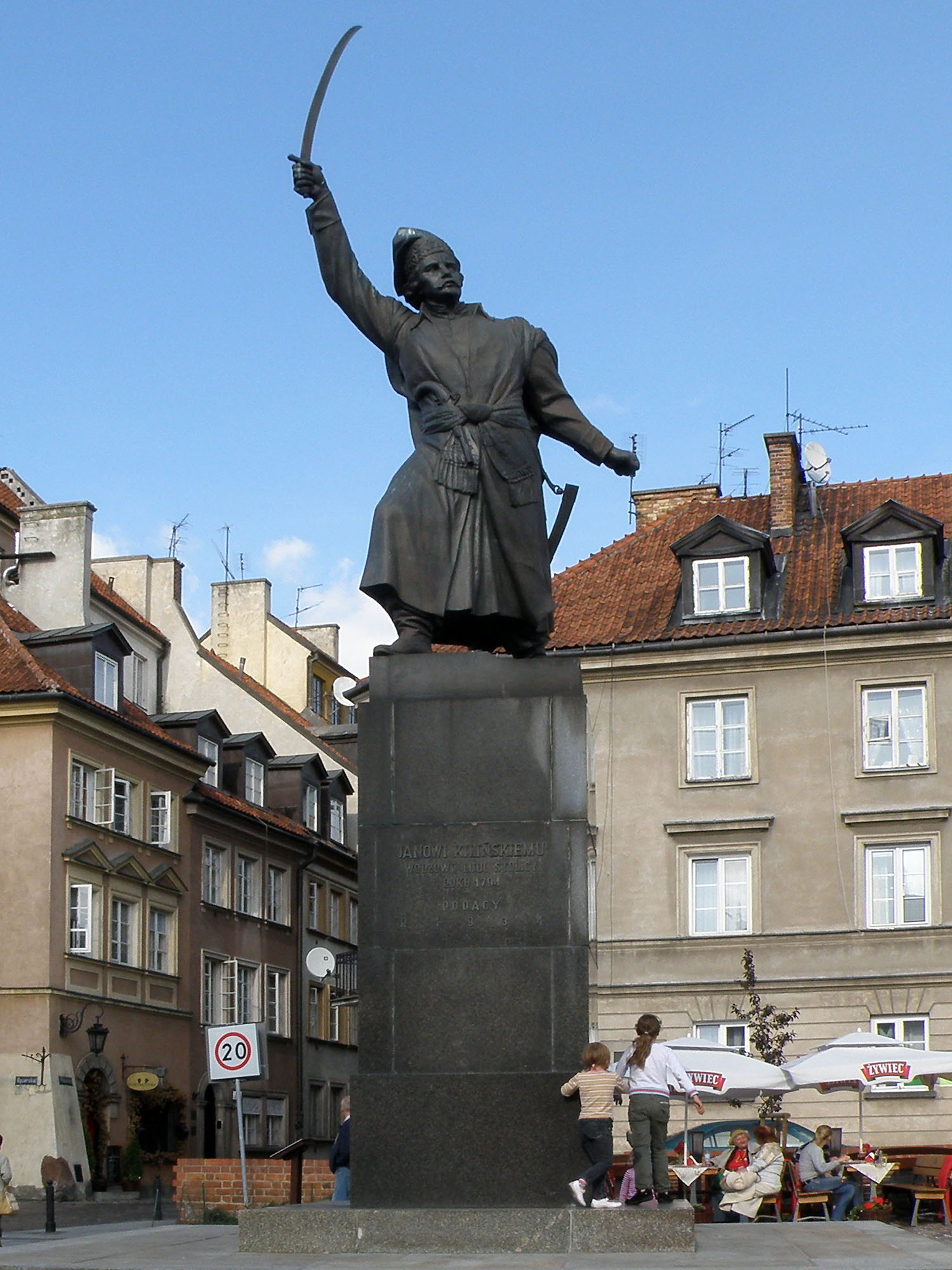
- The monument in 2009
- Interactive map of Statue of Jan Kiliński
- Location: Podwale Street, Downtown, Warsaw, Poland
- Coordinates: 52°14′53.6″N 21°00′39.1″E
- Designer: Stanisław Jackowski
- Type: Sculpture
- Material: Bronze
- Height: 8 m (total); 4 m (statue)
- Completion date: 1935
- Opening date: 19 April 1936
- Restored date: 1946
- Dedicated to: Jan Kiliński
- Dismantled date: March 1942

The statue of Jan Kiliński (Polish: Pomnik Jana Kilińskiego) is a monument in Warsaw, Poland, located on Podwale Street, next to the intersection with Piekarska Street, in the Old Town neighbourhood of the Downtown district. The 8-metre-tall monument consists of a 4-metre-tall bronze statue of Jan Kiliński, a 19th-century artisan, politician, and rebel, who was a colonel in the insurgents forces during the Kościuszko Uprising, placed on a granite pedestal. It was designed by Stanisław Jackowski, and unveiled on 19 April 1936 at the Krasiński Square. It was removed from there in 1942, during the German occupation, and reinstalled in 1946. The monument was moved to its current location in 1959.

== History ==
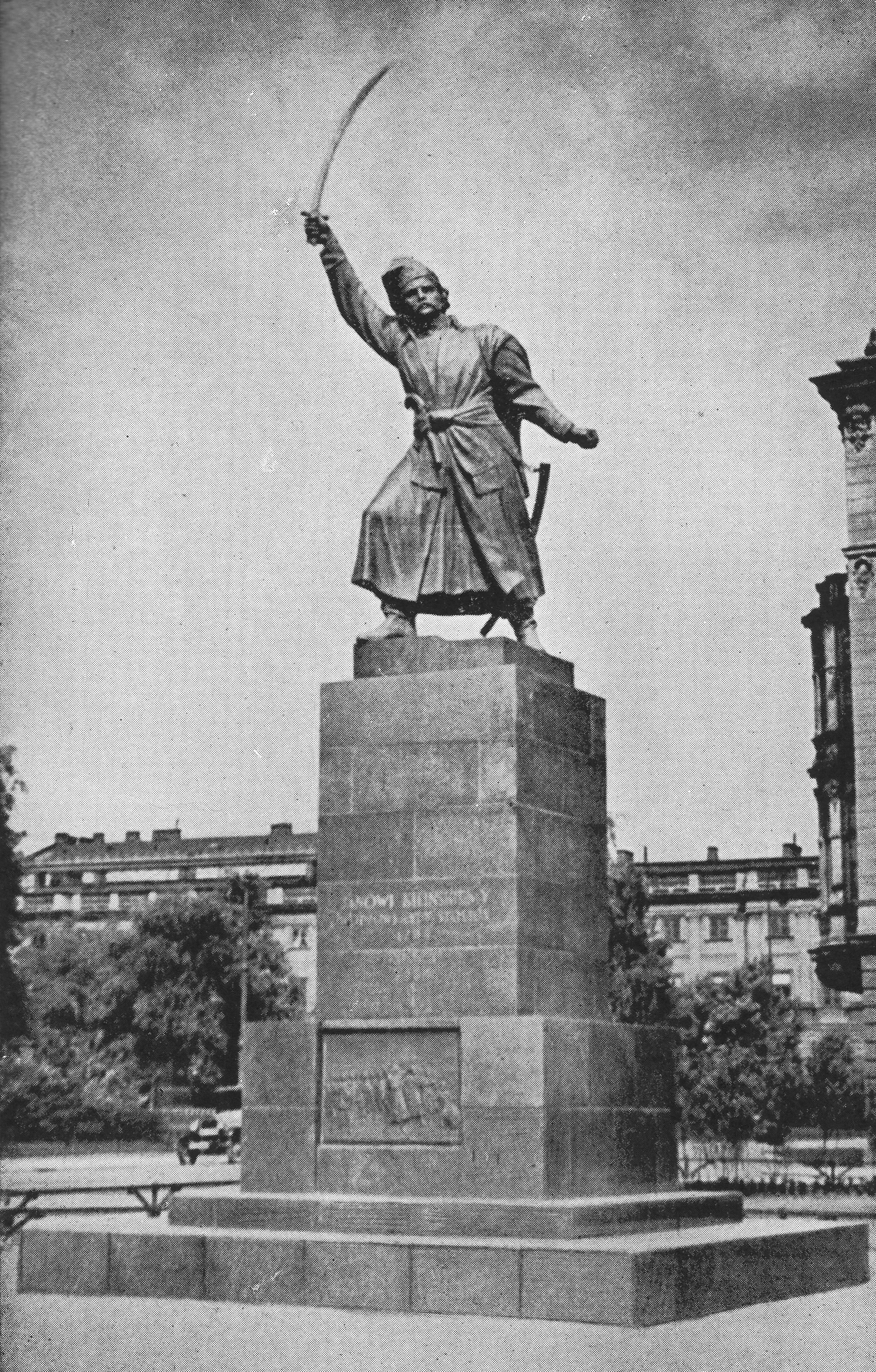
The monument in the 1930s.

The monument was dedicated to Jan Kiliński, a 19th-century artisan, politician, and rebel, who was a colonel in the insurgents forces during the Kościuszko Uprising. It was designed by Stanisław Jackowski, and cast in bronze in 1935 in the Bracia Łopieńscy metal workshops.

The sculpture was a 4-metre-tall statue of Kiliński in a longcoat, with a sable risen high above his head, and a pistol on his belt. It was placed on a tall pedestal made from Finish granite, sourced from the then-recently deconstructed St. Alexander Nevsky Cathedral at Piłsudski Square. On it was placed a Polish inscription which read "Janowi Kilińskiemu, wodzowi ludu roku 1794. Rodacy r. 1934", which translates to "To Jan Kiliński, the leader of the people of the capital of the year 1794. The Countrymen of the year 1934". Underneath it, there was also embedded a metal relief by Walenty Smyczyński, titled Kiliński leading insurgents through the Castle Square (Polish: Kiliński prowadzący powstańców przez plac Zamkowy). It depicted Kiliński leading group of insurgents during the Kościuszko Uprising at the Castle Square. The monument was placed at the Krasiński Square, next to the Krasiński Palace.

The monument was unveiled on 19 April 1936, in the 30th anniversary of the foundation of the Warsaw Artisan Office, in the presence of the president of Poland, Ignacy Mościcki. The ceremony was followed by a parade across the city, featuring representatives of all the artisan trades.

The monument was removed in March 1942, while the city was under the German occupation during the Second World War. It was ordered by the authorities, in the retaliation to Polish resistance movement removing a German propagandist plaque from the Nicolaus Copernicus Monument on 11 February. Originally it was planned for it to be destroyed, however thanks to efforts of historian Stanisław Lorentz, the monument was spared by the authorities. It was instead placed in a warehouse of the National Museum in Warsaw. Soon after, on the building walls the resistance movement wrote "Jam tu ludu W-wy. [Warszawy] – Kiliński Jan", which translates to "People of Warsaw, I am here – Kiliński Jan". There were also circulated pamphlets, credited to Copernicus himself, which read "In retaliation for destruction of the Kiliński Monument, I declare the winter will be prolonged to another 6 weeks". Coincidentally, harsh winter weather indeed lasted unusually long.

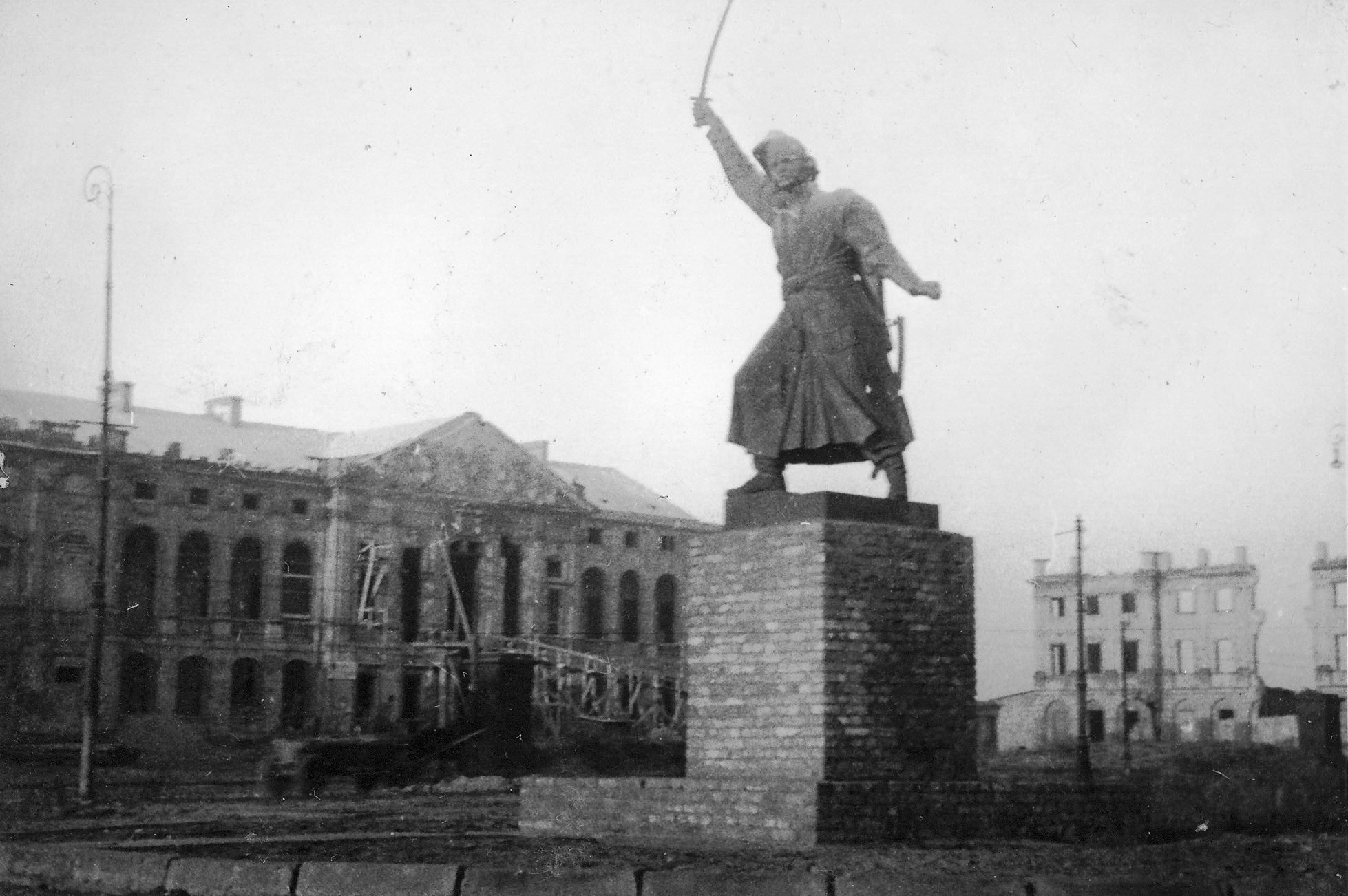
The monument at the Krasiński Square in 1946.

It was one of a few moments in Warsaw that survived the war. The statue however suffered minor damages such as breakage of a right elbow and both arms. It was renovated in 1946 in Bracia Łopieńscy workshop. It was unveiled the same year at the Third of May Avenue in front of the Warsaw National Museum, as one of the first monuments following the end of the war. On 1 September 1946, it was relocated to its original location at the Krasiński Square. It was moved again on 15 November 1959, to Podwale Street, next to the intersection with Piekarska Street. The location was chosen, as it was near what used to be Russian embassy in the 18th century. Kiliński lead an attack on it during the Kościuszko Uprising on 17 April 1794. The statue was placed on a new granite pedestal, which was founded by the local artisans. The relief by Walenty Smyczyński was not embedded again into the structure, and remains in the collection of the Museum of Warsaw instead.

The monument went through a thorough renovation process between 1993 and 1994.

== Characteristics ==
The monument is placed on Podwale Street, next to the intersection with Piekarska Street, in the Old Town neighbourhood of the Downtown district. It consists of a 4-metre-tall bronze statue of Jan Kiliński, a 19th-century artisan, politician, and rebel, who was a colonel in the insurgents forces during the Kościuszko Uprising. He is depicted wearing a hat, long coat tied with a large belt. There is a flintlock pistol behind the belt, near his stomach, and an empty for a sabre, attached next to his left hip. He stands with his right arm raised high above his head, holding a sabre, with his other arm lowered down, and his right foot put at the front. The statue stands on top of a 4-metre-tall granite pedestal, with a square base. It features the following two Polish-language inscriptions. At the front, it says: "Janowi Kilińskiemu, wodzowi ludu roku 1794. Rodacy r. 1934", which translates to "To Jan Kiliński, the leader of the people of the capital of the year 1794. The Countrymen of the year 1934", while on the back, "Cokół pomnika zniszczony przez hitlerowskiego okupanta w roku 1942, odbudowany przez rzemiosło warszawskie w roku 1959", which translates to "The monument's plinth was destroyed by the Nazi occupants in the year of 1942, and rebuilt by the Warsaw artisans in the year of 1959".
