= Jan Kiliński =

Polish soldier

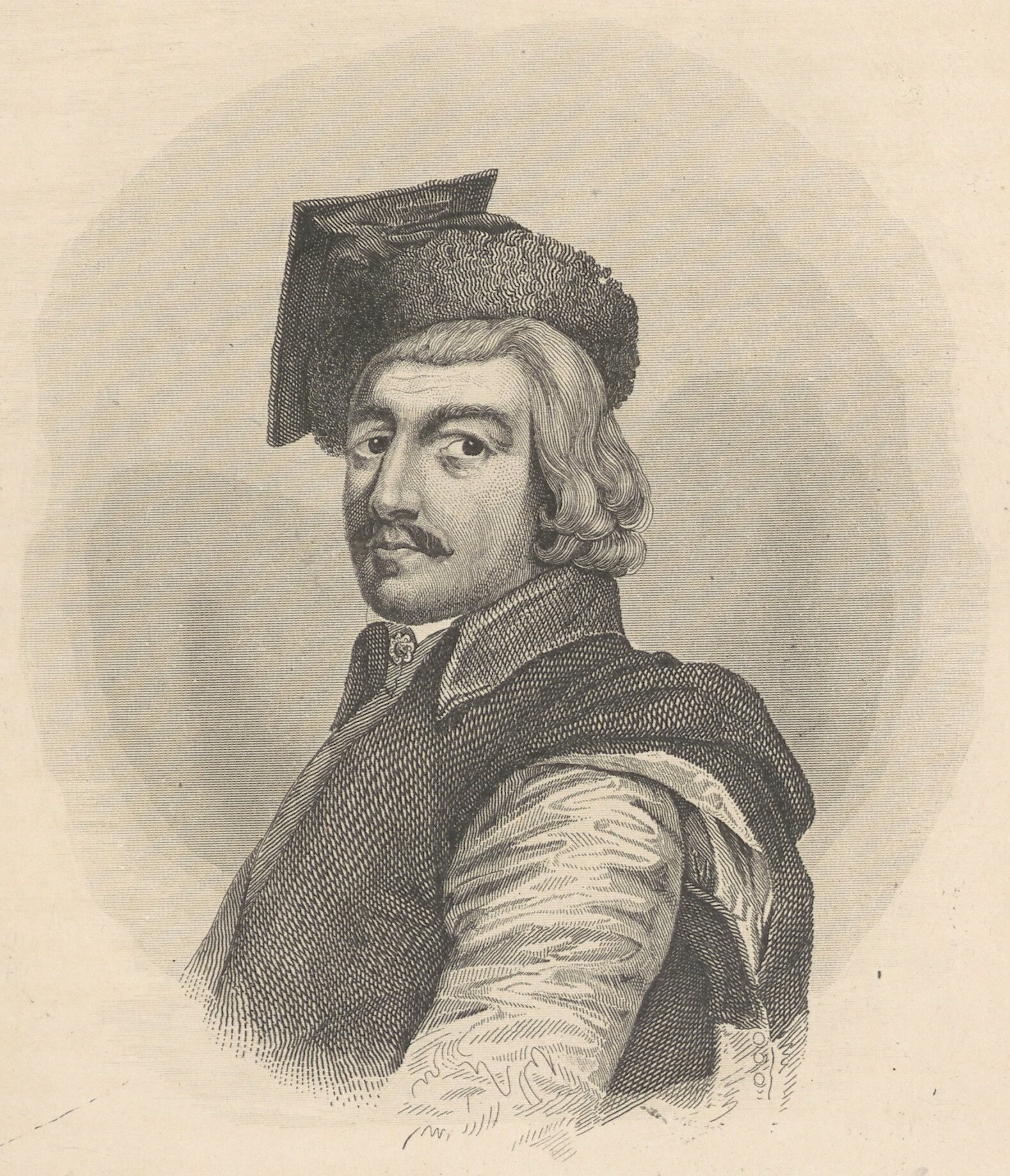
- Jan Kiliński
- Born: 1760; Trzemeszno, Polish–Lithuanian Commonwealth
- Died: 28 January 1819 (aged 59); Warsaw, Congress Poland
- Military career
- Rank: Colonel
- Conflicts: Warsaw Uprising (1794)

Jan Kiliński (1760 in Trzemeszno - 28 January 1819 in Warsaw) was a Polish soldier and one of the commanders of the Kościuszko Uprising. A shoemaker by trade, he commanded the Warsaw Uprising of 1794 against the Russian garrison stationed in Warsaw. He also became a member of Polish provisional government.

== Biography ==
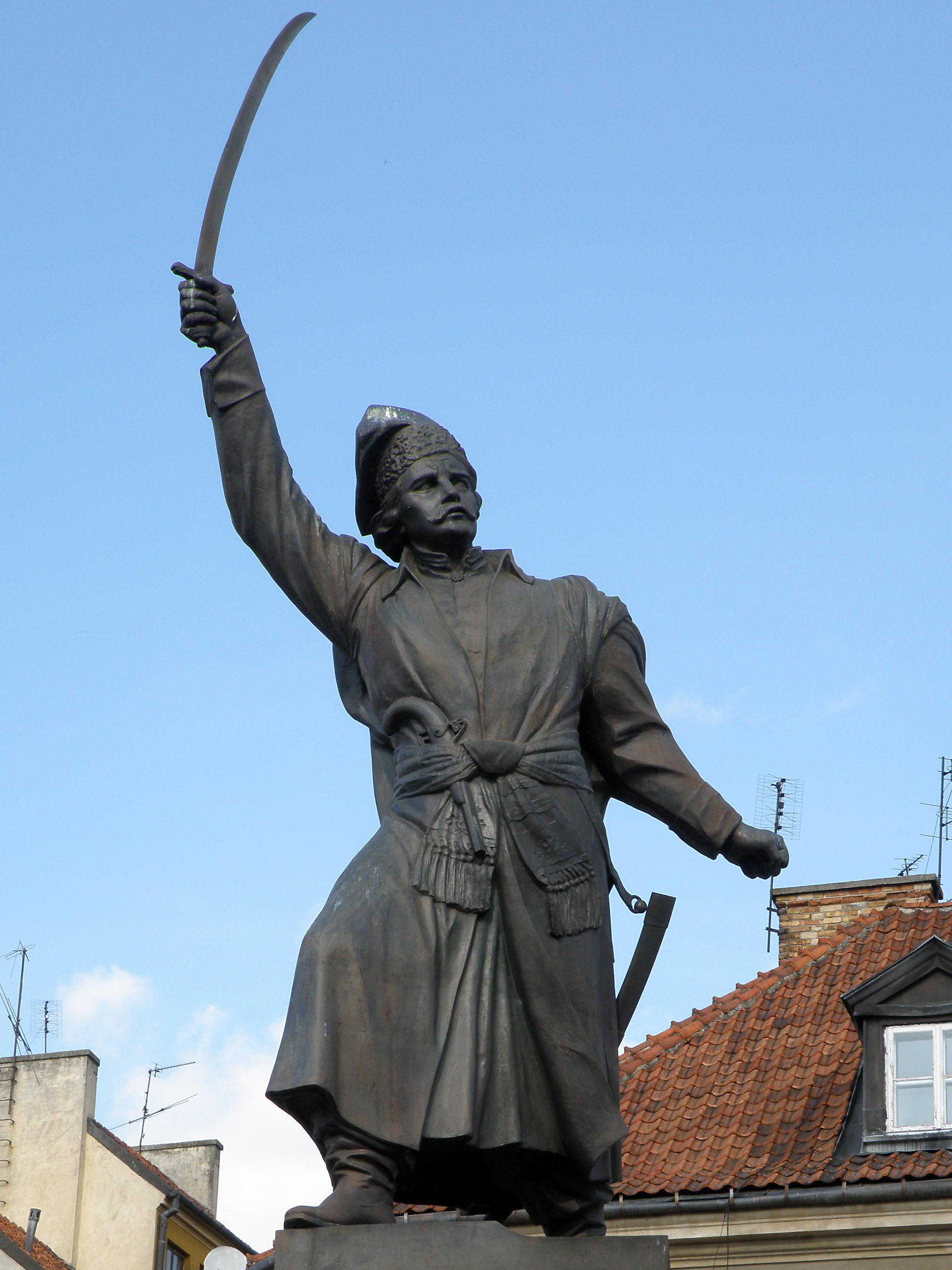
Jan Kiliński Monument in Warsaw by Stanisław Jackowski

Jan Kiliński was born in Trzemeszno, a minor town in the Greater Poland voivodeship. In 1780 he settled in Warsaw, where he became a shoemaking master in 1788. One of the most prominent burghers of the time, he was elected member of the city council three times in a row between 1791 and 1793. During the Warsaw Uprising of 1794, Kiliński formed a unit of National Militia and led his forces, along with the forces of the regular army, against the Russian occupation forces. On April 19 of that year, following the Russian withdrawal, he signed the Access of the city of Warsaw to the Kościuszko's Uprising and entered the Provisional Temporary Council, a temporary ruling body of the city.

The council was soon disbanded and passed its powers to Tadeusz Kościuszko, and Kiliński focused on strengthening his militias. His forces grew to over 20,000 men at arms and on 28 June 1794 were dispatched to the front to link up with the regular Polish Army. On 2 July the same year Kościuszko promoted Kiliński to the rank of Colonel. After the failure of the uprising, Kiliński was arrested by the Prussian authorities and handed over to the Russians, who then imprisoned him in the Peter and Paul Fortress, in St. Petersburg. Upon his release in 1796, he lived in Vilna for a short time. However, he was yet again arrested for conspiracy against the tsarist authorities and forcibly resettled in Russia. Upon his return he settled in Warsaw, where he died on 28 January 1819. Kiliński was buried in a crypt at the Powązki Cemetery Church. His memoirs were posthumously published in 1830 and 1899 (1st and 2nd volumes, respectively).

== Tributes ==
Kiliński Park, in Lwów, was named after him.
