= Stanisław Jackowski =

Polish sculptor (1887-1951)

- Born: 1887; Warsaw, Poland
- Died: 1951 (aged 63–64); Katowice, Poland
- Education: Jagiellonian University; Jan Matejko Academy of Fine Arts; Académie Colarossi
- Notable work: The Dancing Girl; Statue of Jan Kiliński
- Relatives: Bolesław Prus (uncle)

Stanisław Jackowski (1887–1951) was a Polish sculptor. He was the nephew of novelist Bolesław Prus.

== Biography ==
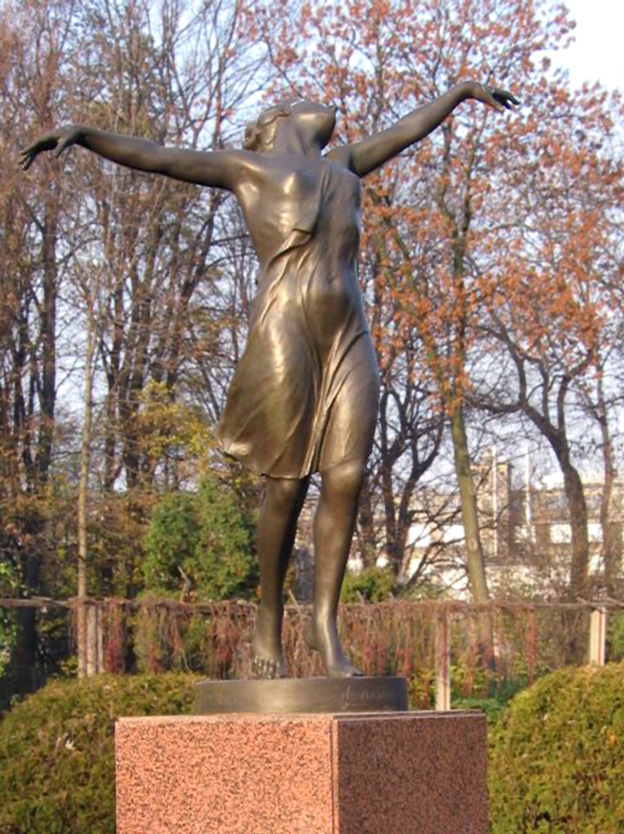
Dancer, Skaryszewski Park (1927), Warsaw

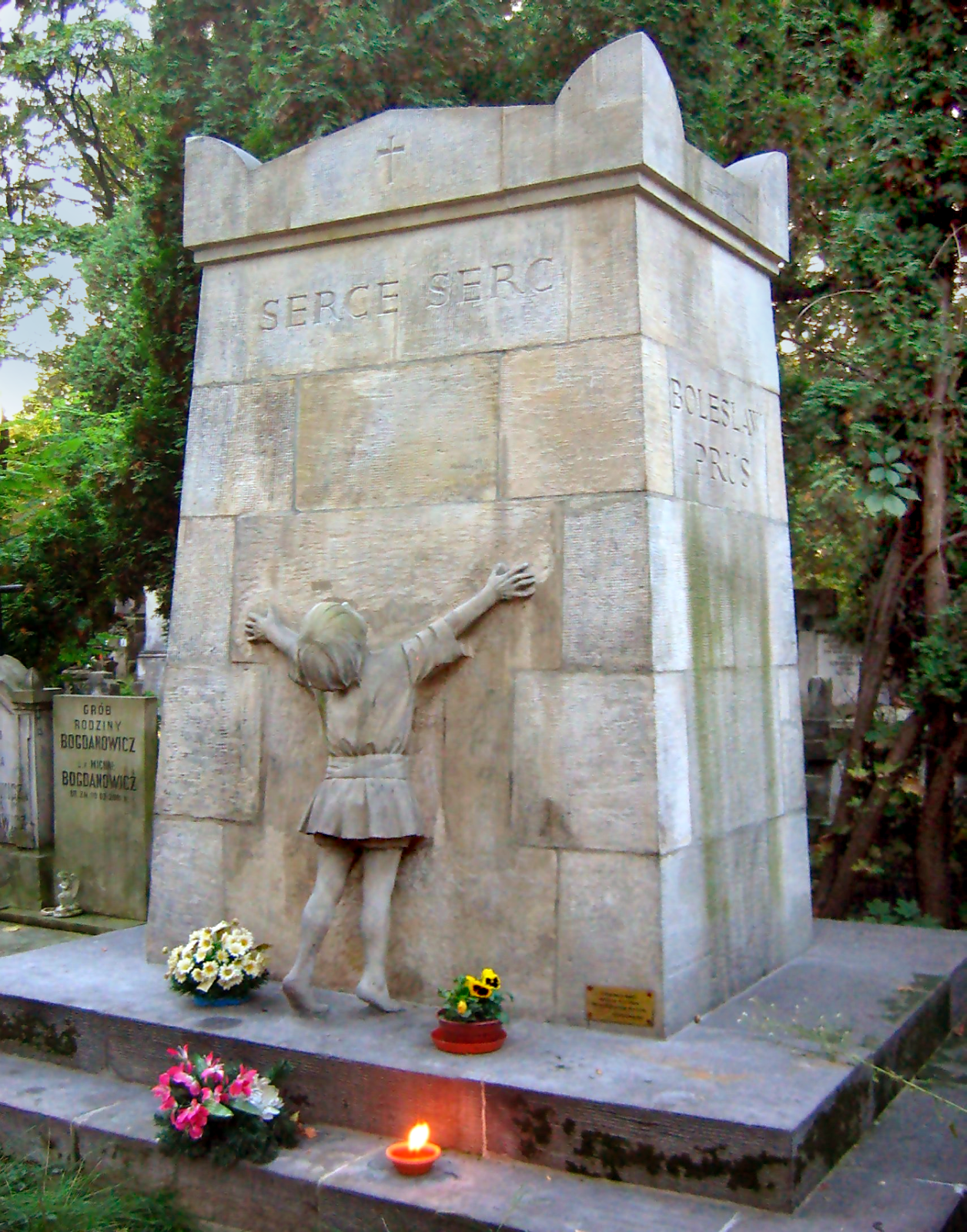
Prus' tomb by Jackowski (1912)

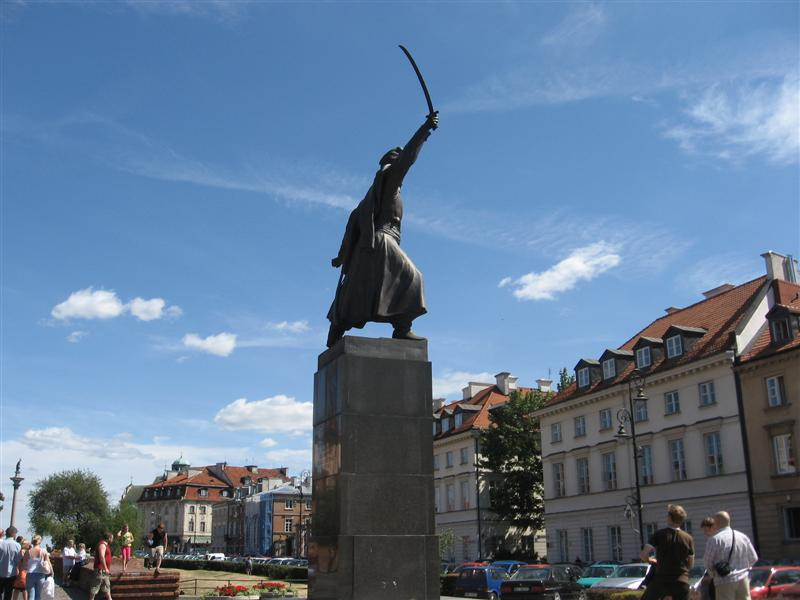
Statue of Jan Kiliński, Warsaw

Stanisław Jackowski was born in 1887 to Polish parents in Warsaw, in the part of Poland then ruled by the Russian Empire following the Partitions of Poland.

From 1909 to 1911, Jackowski studied sculpture at the Academy of Fine Arts in Kraków under Konstanty Laszczka, as well as the history of art at Kraków University. From 1911 to 112 he attended the Académie Colarossi in Paris, France.

Jackowski completed his art studies before the First World War in Kraków, the Austrian-ruled part of Poland, and throughout the Interwar period lived and worked in Warsaw. He was a member, and for many years president, of the Rzeźba (Sculpture) Society.

Jackowski died in 1951 in Katowice, Poland.

== Works ==
In 1912 Jackowski designed the Powązki Cemetery tomb of his uncle, novelist Bolesław Prus. The monument bears on three sides, respectively, the writer's actual name Aleksander Głowacki, his dates of birth and death, and his pen name Bolesław Prus. On the fourth side is the inscription "Serce serc" ("Heart of hearts"), borrowed from the Latin inscription "Cor cordium" on the tomb of English Romantic poet Percy Bysshe Shelley in Rome's Protestant Cemetery; and below this inscription is the figure of a little girl embracing Prus' tomb — a figure emblematic of Prus' well-known empathy and affection for children.

Jackowski created over a dozen monuments, including those of Tadeusz Kościuszko and Jan Kiliński in Warsaw.

He also designed many portraits in marble and bronze, including the 1936 memorial to Bolesław Prus in Warsaw's Holy Cross Church. Set into the marble plaque is a bronze bas-relief profile of Prus, his actual and pen names, dates of birth and death, and the inscription, "great writer and teacher of the nation."

Jackowski also produced a series of sculptures, Tańcerka (Dancer), one of which, created in 1927, stands in Warsaw's Skaryszewski Park.

== See also ==
- List of Polish artists

== Notes and references ==
- Katalog rzeźb Stanisława Jackowskiego (Catalog of Sculptures by Stanisław Jackowski), Towarzystwo Przyjaciół Sztuk Pięknych w Krakowie (Society of Friends of the Fine Arts in Kraków), Kraków, 1951.
- Dariusz Kaczmarczyk, Rzeźba polska od XVI do początku XX wieku: Katalog zbiorów Muzeum Narodowego w Warszawie (Polish Sculpture from the 16th to the Beginning of the 20th Century: Catalog of Collections of the National Museum in Warsaw), Warsaw, 1973.
- Hanna Kubaszewska, Słownik artystów polskich i obcych w Polsce działających: Malarze, rzeżbiarze, graficy (Dictionary of Polish and Foreign Artists Active in Poland: Painters, Sculptors, Graphic Artists), vol. 3, Wrocław, 1979.
- Miłosz Kotarbiński, "Kilka luźnych wspomnień o Bolesławie Prusie" ("Several Loose Reminiscences about Bolesław Prus"), in Stanisław Fita, ed., Wspomnienia o Bolesławie Prusie (Reminiscences about Bolesław Prus), Warsaw, Państwowy Instytut Wydawniczy, 1962, pp. 147–48, 151.
- Tadeusz Hiż, "Godzina u pani Oktawii" ("An Hour at Oktawia Głowacka's"), in Stanisław Fita, ed., Wspomnienia o Bolesławie Prusie (Reminiscences about Bolesław Prus), Warsaw, Państwowy Instytut Wydawniczy, 1962, p. 279.
- Gabriela Pauszer-Klonowska, Ostatnia miłość w życiu Bolesława Prusa (The Last Love in the Life of Bolesław Prus), Warsaw, Państwowy Instytut Wydawniczy, 1962.
