= The Bathers =

"The Bathers", or in French "Les Baigneuses", may refer to:

== Paintings ==
- Bathers at Asnières, a painting by Georges Seurat in 1883
- Les Grandes Baigneuses (Renoir), by Pierre-Auguste Renoir in 1887
- The Bathers (Renoir), another painting by Pierre-Auguste Renoir in 1918–1919
- A painting by Paul Gauguin in 1898
- The Bathers (Cézanne), by Paul Cézanne, who has a number of paintings with this title
- The Bathers (Gleizes), a 1912 painting by Albert Gleizes
- The Bathers (Metzinger), a c. 1908 painting by Jean Metzinger
- The Bathers, a painting by Australian artist Lionel Jago in 1950

== Other uses ==
- The Bathers (band), a Scottish band

== See also ==
- The Bather (disambiguation)
