= Philip Dru: Administrator =

1912 novel by Edward House

Philip Dru: Administrator: A Story of Tomorrow, 1920-1935
- Title page, 1912
- Author: Edward Mandell House
- Language: English
- Genre: Political novel
- Publisher: B. W. Huebsch
- Publication date: 1912
- Publication place: United States
- Pages: 312
- OCLC: 1533564

Philip Dru: Administrator: A Story of Tomorrow, 1920-1935 is a futuristic political novel published in 1912 by Edward Mandell House, an American diplomat, politician, and presidential foreign policy advisor. The book's author was originally unknown with an anonymous publication, however House's identity was revealed in a speech on the Senate floor by Republican Senator Lawrence Sherman. According to historians, House highly prized his work and gave a copy of Dru to his closest political ally, Woodrow Wilson, to read while on a trip to Bermuda.

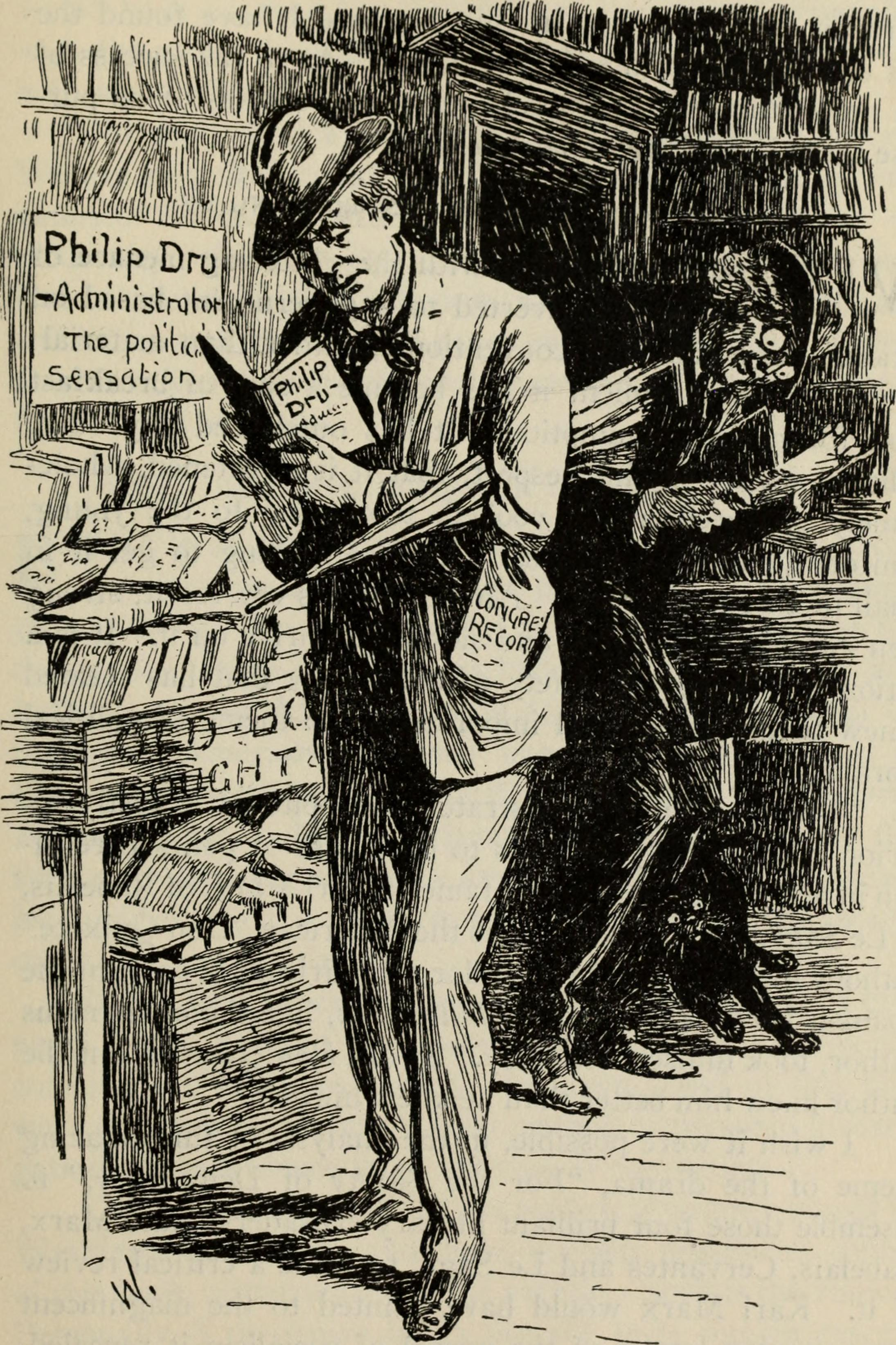
Senator Sherman Discovers the Basis of Political Morality, cartoon published in The Forum (1919)

== Book reviews ==
Dru has been the subject of significant historical review and commentary, partly due to its popularity at the time. John Milton Cooper Jr. writes in his biography of Woodrow Wilson that this political novel is largely ghostwritten. House biographer Charles E. Neu disagrees with this, noting that within the House Papers there is an original manuscript in House's own writing, with another typed draft that has correcting notes.

Historian Paul Johnson wrote: "Oddly enough, in 1911 he [House] had published a political novel, Philip Dru: Administrator, in which a benevolent dictator imposed a corporate income tax, abolished the protective tariff, and broke up the 'credit trust'—a remarkable adumbration of Woodrow Wilson and his first term."

Billie Jensen, a historian from the University of Kansas noted:

Philip Dru was obviously an expression both of House's ambition and his political dreams and it was an expression of the ideas of the man who had an impressive amount of influence on Woodrow Wilson. Seldom have the elements of a utopia been implemented so soon as the reforms of Philip Dru were; seldom has a utopian reformer been as influential as House was. For these reasons, Philip Dru is a significant political document.

In a book review for The New York Times, Walter Lippmann wrote of the novel and its anonymous author:

if the author is really a man of affairs, this is an extraordinarily interesting book. It shows how utterly juvenile a great man can be. If he is really an "insider" then we on the outside have very little to learn. ... The imagination is that of a romantic boy of 14 who dreams of what he would do if he had supreme power and nobody objected.

In a mostly positive commentary on the book, Philip Bobbitt argued that it is unlikely Lippmann had so little to learn from the Colonel, noting how eight major reforms from the book, some of them initially opposed by both President Wilson and his Home Secretary Bryan, were passed into law only 4 years after House became advisor to the President.

Wilson's Secretary of the Interior Franklin K. Lane noted, according to historian Arthur M. Schlesinger Jr., that there were similarities between Wilson's governing style and the writings contained in the novel: "All that book has said should be, comes about slowly, even woman suffrage. The President comes to Philip Dru in the end."

Senator Lawrence Y. Sherman talked about the book in congress, noting its substantial influence. He said:

Here is exhibited the Colonel's whole mental viscera. If there be twilight zones in the biography of 1918, the Colonel's 312 pages of fiction flashed from the watchtowers of 1912 a searchlight athwart the gloaming so any wayfarer can see everything. Suffice it to know Philip Dru is an autobiography of the Colonel himself and solves the Conundrum how to get rid of the Constitution.

Historian Walter A. McDougall compared Philip Dru to the 1933 dystopian film Gabriel Over the White House.

== Synopsis ==
Set in 1920–1935, House's hero, Philip Dru, leads the democratic western United States in a civil war against the plutocratic eastern United States states. His forces win the war, and he becomes the acclaimed leader of the country, under the title "Administrator of the Republic." He establishes justice and democracy, bringing in progressive taxation, universal adult suffrage, a new national constitution, and peace-based foreign relations. He breaks up corporate monopolies and ends price-fixing, and in other ways makes a government "of the people, by the people, for the people." (p. 157) while rejecting "state ownership and the levelling of wealth”. In the course of the book, House outlines many political advances such as:

- Federal Incorporation Act, with government and labor representation on the board of every corporation
- Public service corporations must share their net earnings with government
- Government ownership of all telegraphs
- Government ownership of all telephones
- Government representation in railroad management
- Single term presidency
- Old age pension law reform
- Workmen's insurance law
- Co-operative marketing and land banks
- Free employment bureaus
- 8 hour work day, six days a week
- Labor not to be a commodity
- Government arbitration of industrial disputes
- Government ownership of all healthcare

Although he and his supporters carry the day and reign triumphantly, his reign does not go on forever.

=== Cast of characters ===
The book has several characters. Philip Dru is the main protagonist of the story. Other characters include Gloria Strawn (Dru's love interest) and her brother Jack Strawn, John Thor, and Senator Selwyn.
