= Olga Niewska =

Polish sculptor

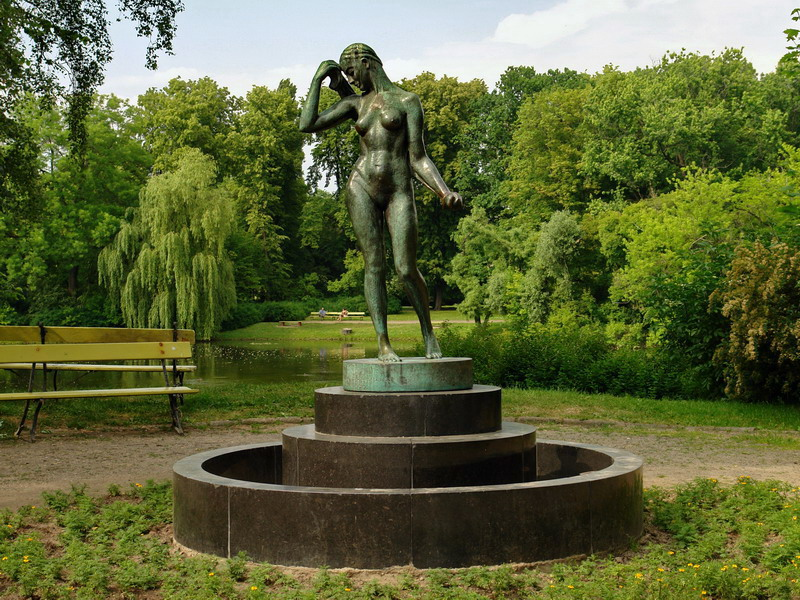
Niewska's sculpture "Kąpiąca się (Bathing)" in Skaryszewski Park, Warsaw

Olga Niewska (28 May 1898 – 25 May 1943) was a Polish sculptor who competed in the art competitions at the 1928, 1932 and 1936 Summer Olympics.

== Life ==
Niewska was born in Kharkiv in Ukraine in 1898 and after completing school she then studied at the Kiev School of Painting in 1919. She studied under Konstanty Laszczka when she created busts of the socialist politician Ignacy Daszyński and the painter Feliks Stanisław Jasiński. In 1923, she moved to Warsaw before moving on to Paris where she studied with the sculptor Antoine Bourdelle from 1926 to 1928. She also produced a statue of Stanisława Walasiewicz (also known as Stella Walsh),

In 1928 she married, and at the annual exhibition at the Salon of the Polish Artists Union in Warsaw, her sculpture was awarded the "Warsaw Prize for the Year 1928". In September 1929 her bathing sculpture was unveiled in Paderewski's park. During the next decade, she was productive and successful. She created both medallions and sculptures. Shortly before the war, she created a portrait of the actor Stefan Jaracz which is considered one of her best.

She died in 1943.
