= Skaryszew Park =

Urban park in Warsaw, Poland

Coordinates: 52.2428°N 21.0567°E

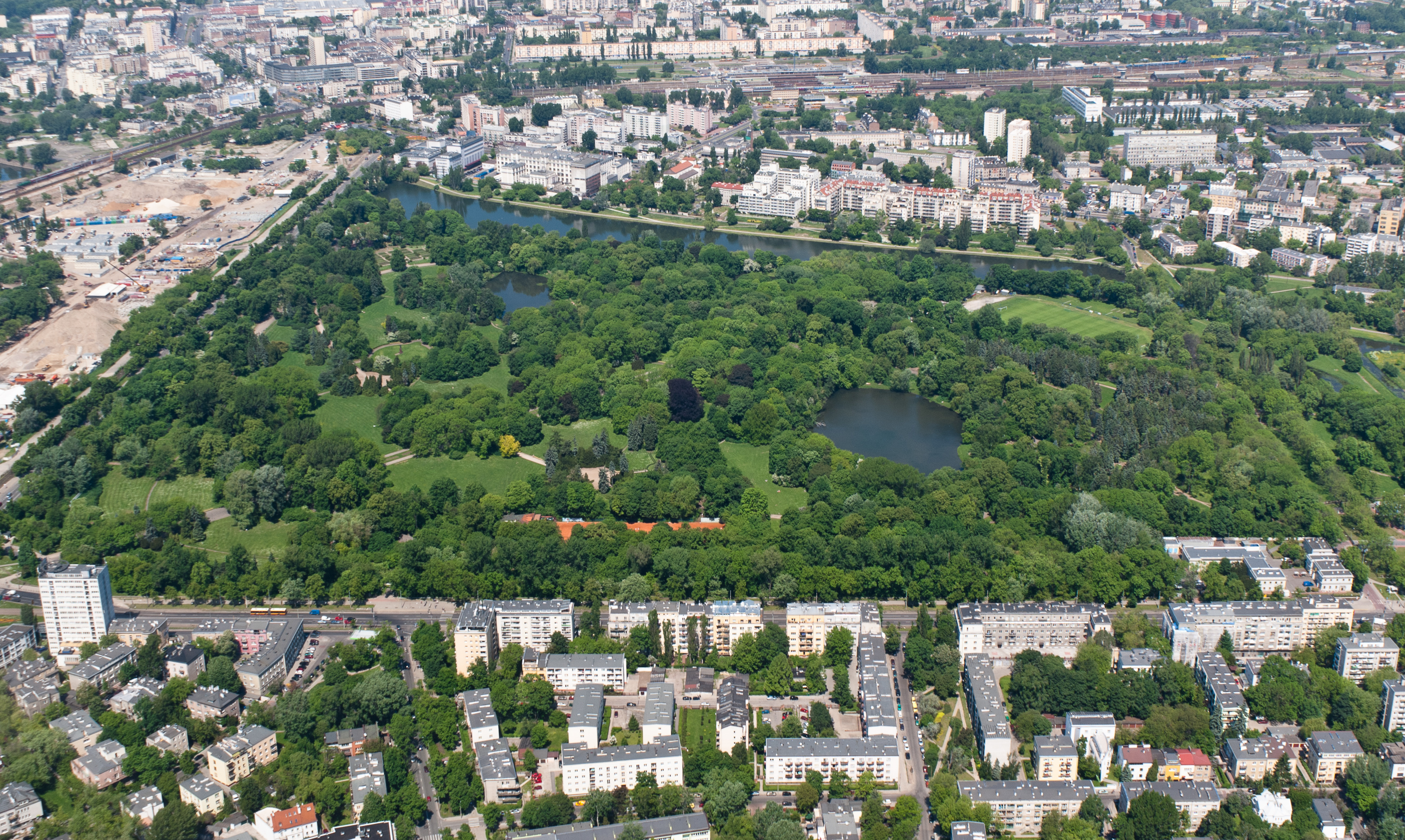
Skaryszew Park seen from above

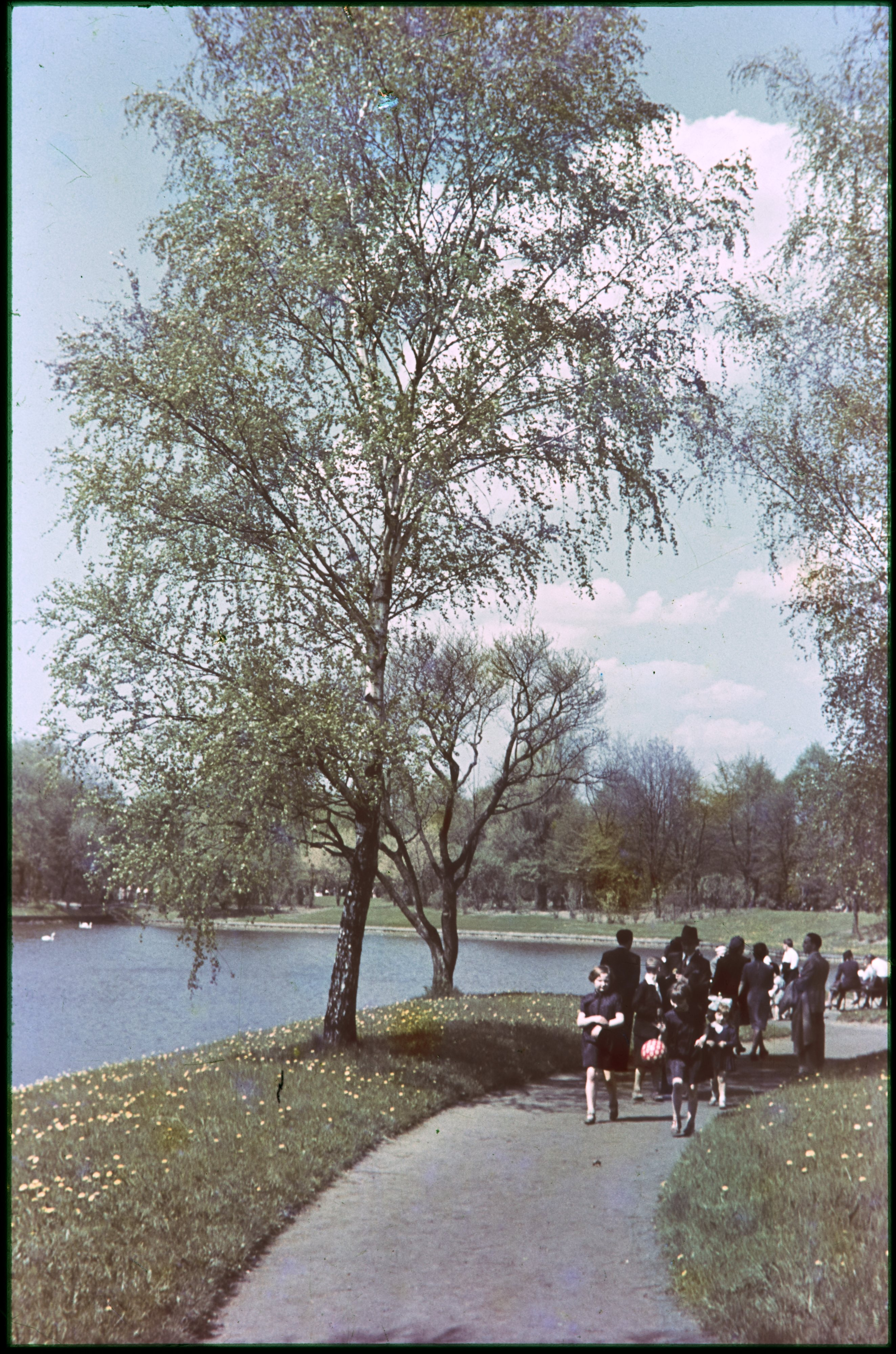
Skaryszew Park in 1939 (an alley by the pond Staw Kaczy).

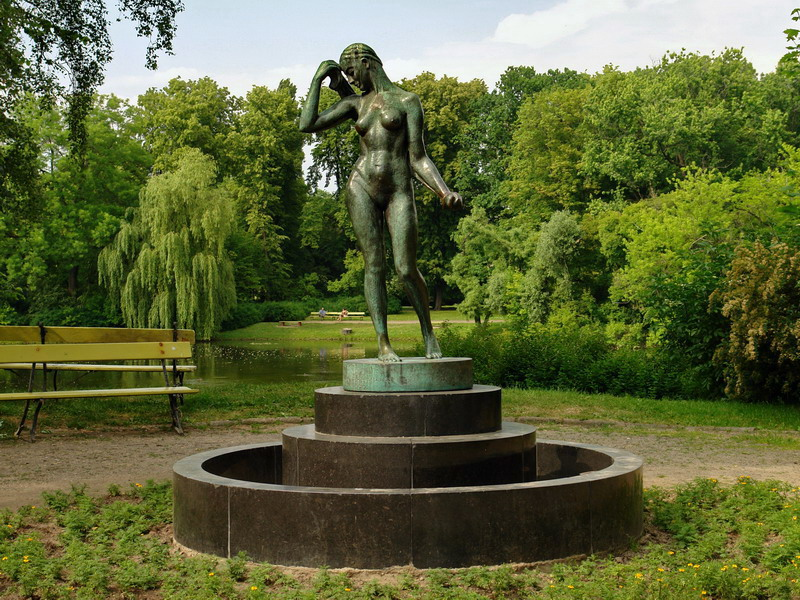
Olga Niewska's sculpture

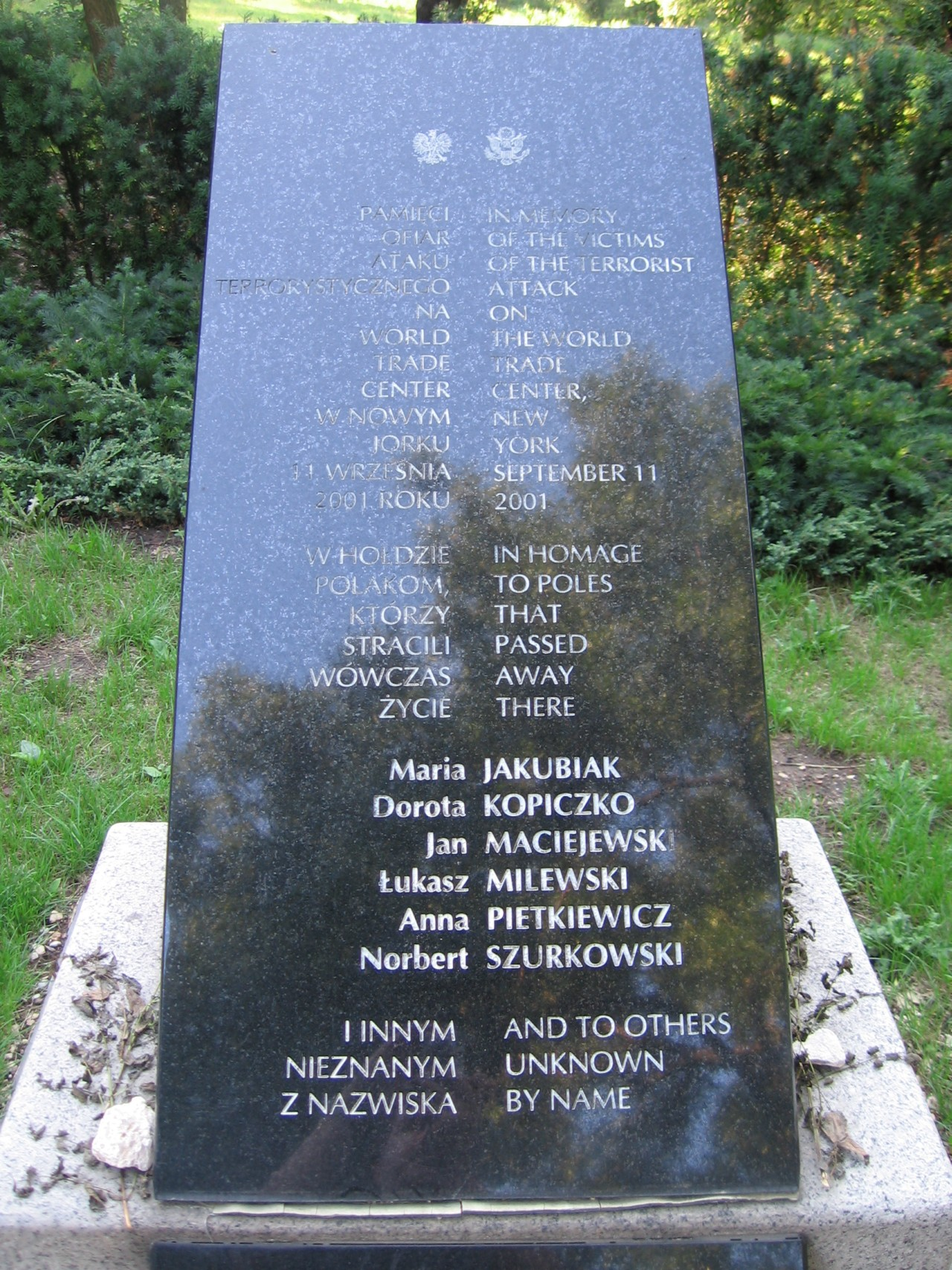
Monument for Polish victims on the September 11 attacks, 2001.

Skaryszew Park (pronounced Sca-ri-chef) is an urban, monumental park located in the Praga-Południe (South Praga) district of Warsaw, Poland. The park was designed and created by Franciszek Szanior in 1906.

== Location and name ==
Skaryszew Park is situated on the right bank of Vistula River. It occupies 58 ha, an area formerly made of meadows and pastures which previously belonged to the village of Skaryszew in the 17th and 18th centuries. In 1929, during the interwar period, the park was named after Ignacy Jan Paderewski, a famous Polish pianist, composer, and politician who contributed significantly to Poland's independence. Paderewski's name, removed after World War II for political reasons, was finally restored in 1980. Varsovians, especially the young ones, usually call the park "Skaryszak".

== Monuments ==
- Bust of Ignacy Jan Paderewski (1988). Stands at the entrance to the park. Founded by Janina and Zbigniew Porczyńscy.
- Dancer (1926, by Stanisław Jackowski). Situated in the rose garden. Sculpture of a young women dancing in ecstasy.
- Bathing woman (1929, by Olga Nieniewska). Situated on a small hill by the lake. Sculpture of a bathing woman.
- Monument to Edward Mandell House (1932, by Franciszek Black, Reconstructed by Marian Konieczny). House, the most trusted advisor of the American President Thomas Woodrow Wilson, advocated Poland's independence after World War I. The original sculpture was founded by Ignacy Jan Paderewski. The monument survived the World War II, yet was destroyed in 1951.
- Monument to the Red Army Soldiers (15 September 1946). Originally built over a grave of twenty six Soviet soldiers, killed between 10 and 15 September 1944 during the heavy fighting in the area. In 1968, the bodies were buried in a cemetery and the monument relocated to its present location. After 1989, it was devastated and restored on multiple occasions. Despite Russia's protests, the monument was demolished in October, 2018.
- Monument to British pilots (1988). Situated in the rose garden near the dancer's sculpture. It commemorates the death of British pilots whose Consolidated B-24 Liberator was shot down by the Germans on 13 August 1944 during the Warsaw Uprising, and crashed on this site. It was unveiled in 1988 by Margaret Thatcher in the presence of Sergeant Henry Lloyd Lane, the only survivor of the crash.
- Monument for Polish - Victims of the September 11 attacks (2002). The monument is established for the Polish victims during the attack on New York City, and was unveiled by Polish President Aleksander Kwaśniewski in 2002, on the 1st anniversary of the attacks.

== Other interesting objects ==
- Kamionkowskie Lake. Vistula's old river bed, now a centre of recreation. Canoe and pedalos are available for rental.
- Amphitheatre. A place where numerous cultural events, concerts and movie shows are held.
- Shrine (1937, designed by Janusz Alchimowicz). Constructed in white concrete.
