= Kielce =

City in Świętokrzyskie Voivodeship, Poland

- City county
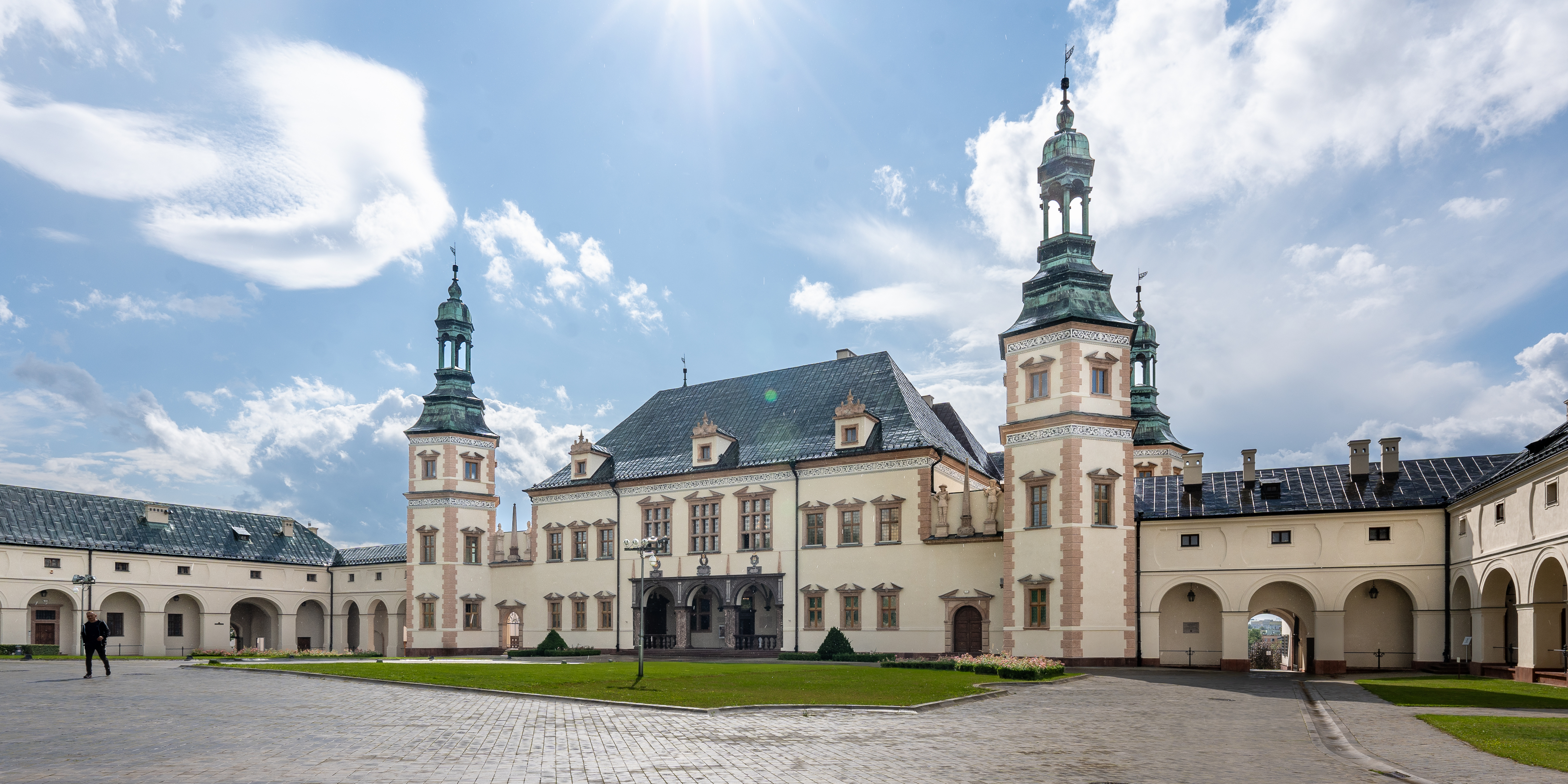
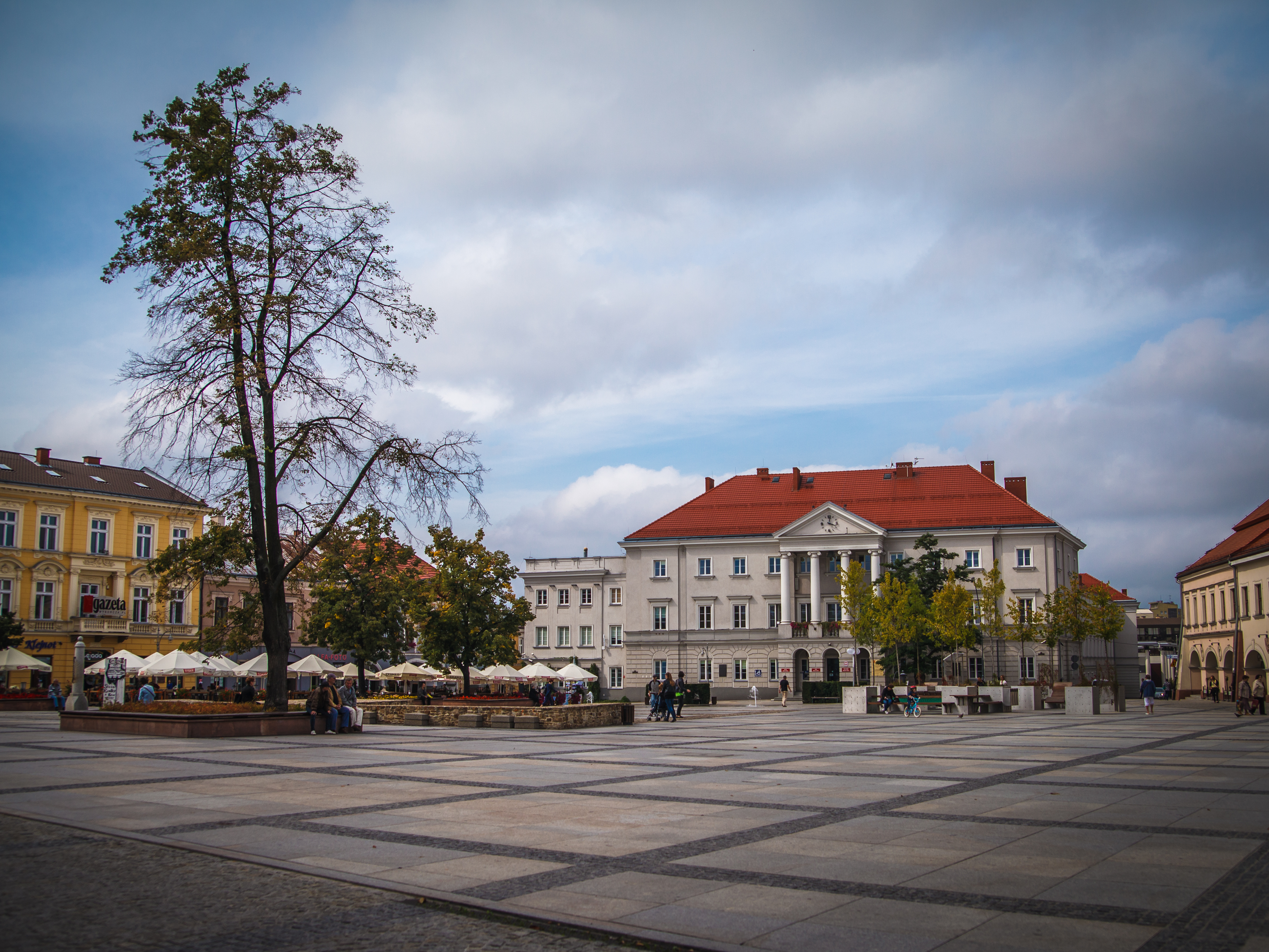
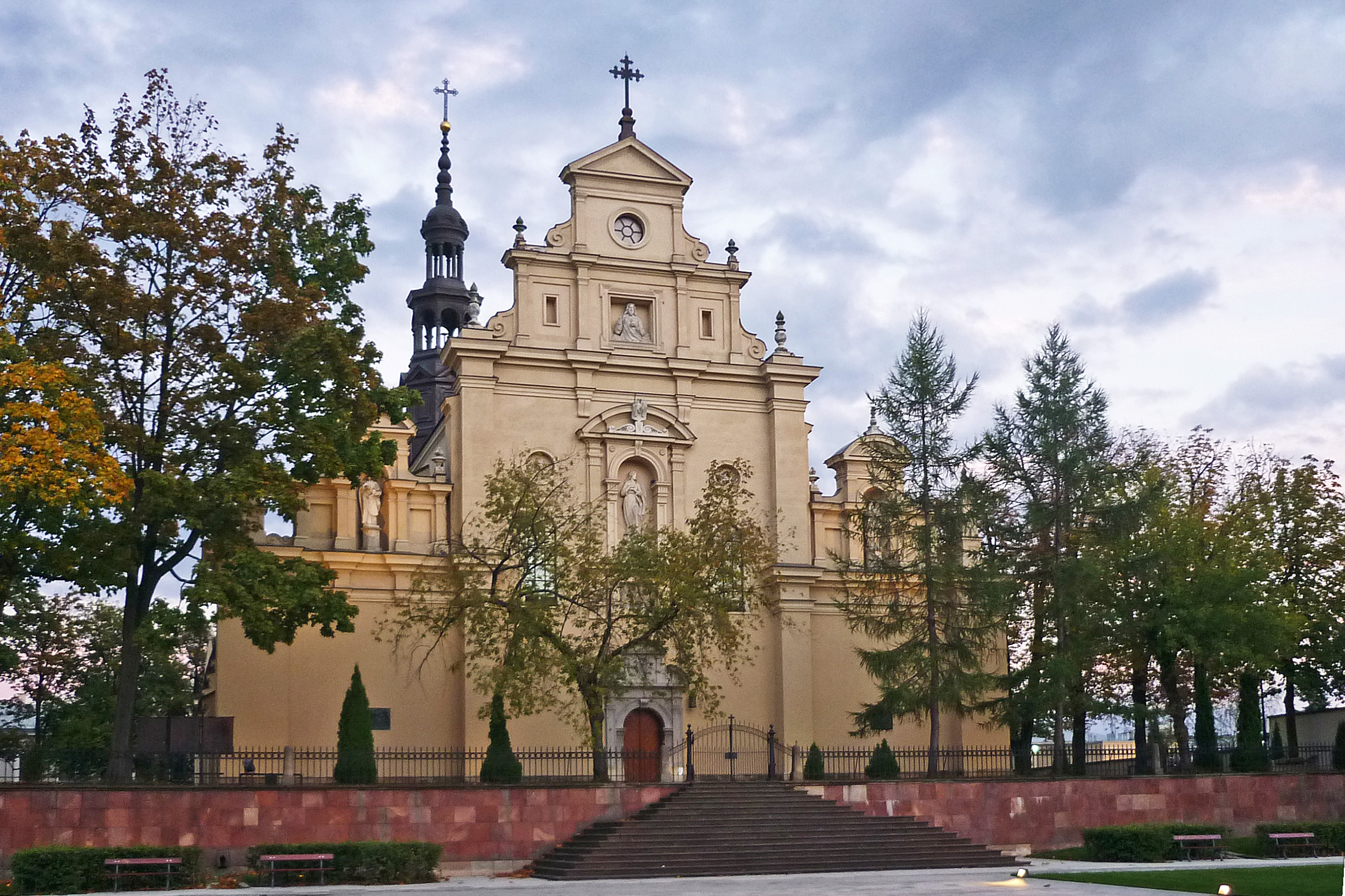
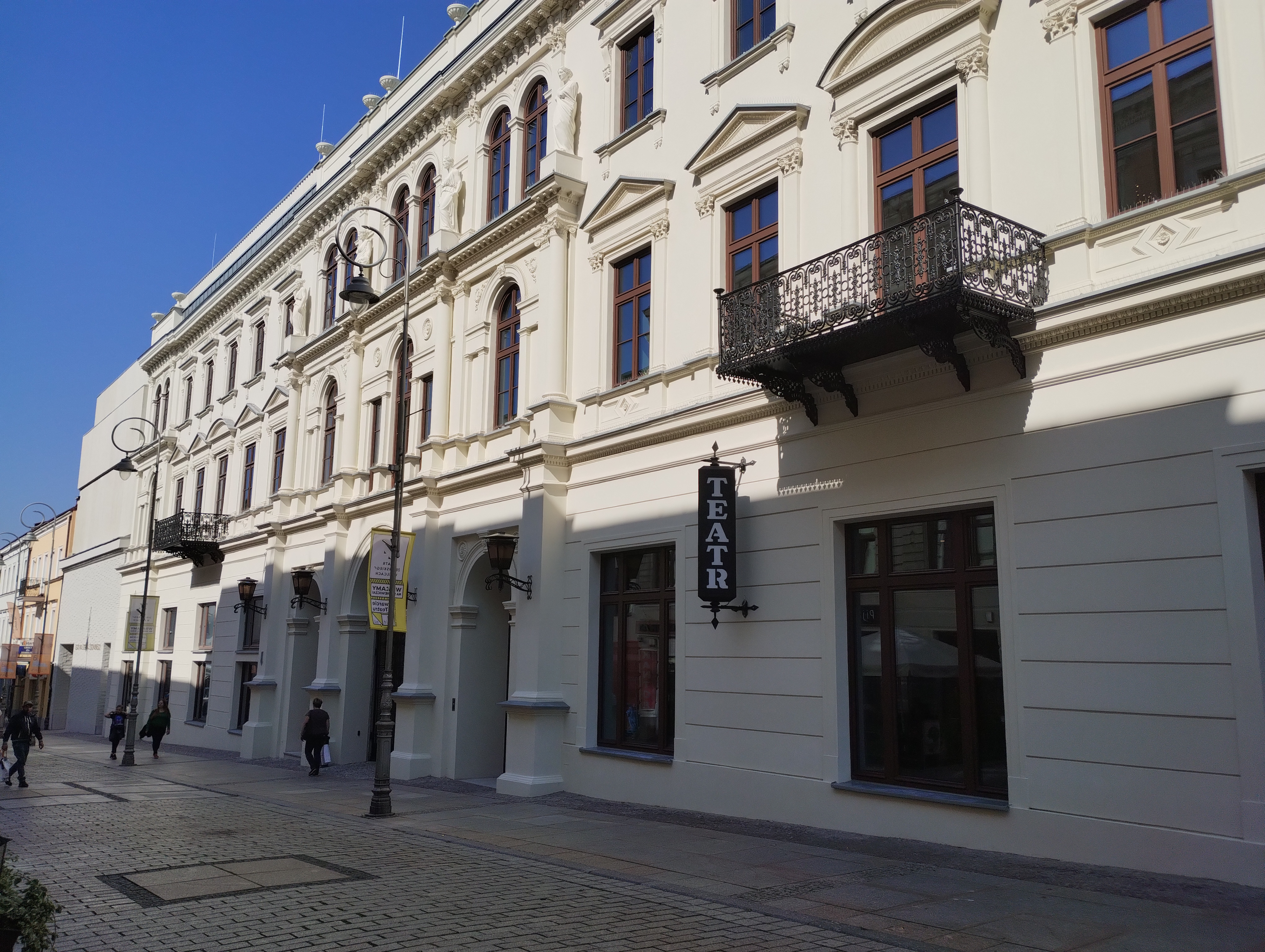
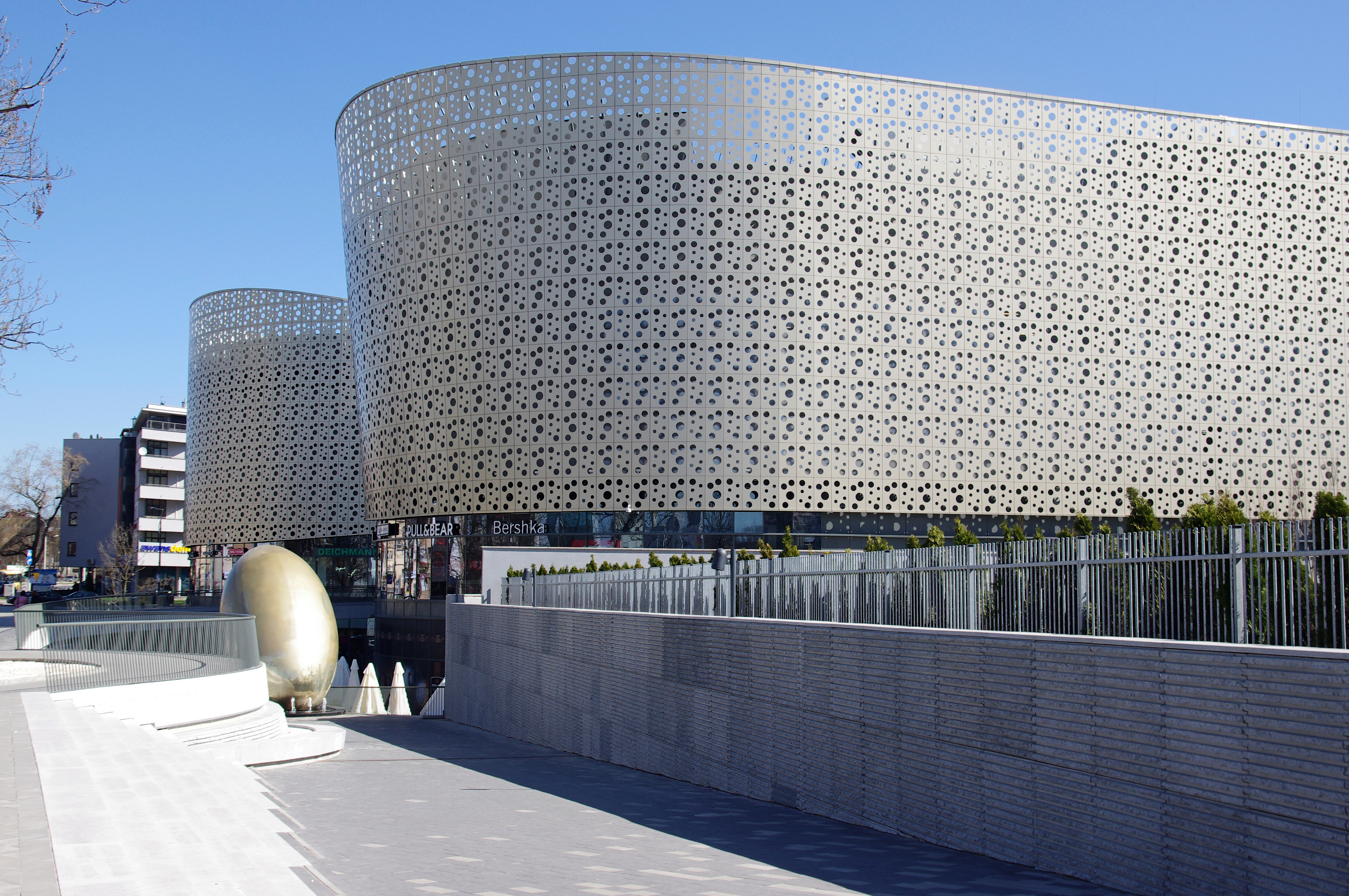
- Bishops' Palace Market Square Kielce Cathedral Żeromski Theatre Galeria Korona

- Flag Coat of arms

- Location within Poland
- Coordinates: 50°52′27″N 20°38′00″E
- Country: Poland
- Voivodeship: Świętokrzyskie
- County: city county
- Established: 11th century
- Town rights: before 1259

Government
  - Mayor: Agata Wojda (PO)

Area
  - Total: 109.65 km^{2} (42.34 sq mi)
- Highest elevation: 408 m (1,339 ft)
- Lowest elevation: 260 m (850 ft)

Population (31 December 2021)
  - Total: 192,468 ▼ (18th)
  - Density: 1,780/km^{2} (4,600/sq mi)
- Demonym(s): kielczanin (male) kielczanka (female) (pl)
- Time zone: UTC+1 (CET)
  - Summer (DST): UTC+2 (CEST)
- Postal code: 25-001 to 25-900
- Area code: +48 41
- ISO 3166 code: PL-KI
- Car plates: TK
- Website: http://www.kielce.eu

Kielce (Polish: [ˈkʲɛlt͡sɛ]; Yiddish: קעלץ, romanized: Keltz) is a city in south-central Poland. It is the capital of the Świętokrzyskie Voivodeship. In 2021, it had 192,468 inhabitants. The city is in the middle of the Świętokrzyskie Mountains (Holy Cross Mountains), on the banks of the Silnica River, in the northern part of the historical Polish province of Lesser Poland.

Kielce has a history back over 900 years, and the exact date that it was founded remains unknown. Kielce was once an important centre of limestone mining, and the vicinity is famous for its natural resources like copper, lead, uranium, and iron, which, over the centuries, were exploited on a large scale.

There are several fairs and exhibitions held in Kielce throughout the year. One of the city's most famous food products is Kielecki Mayonnaise, a type of mayonnaise.

The city and its surroundings are also known for their historic architecture, green spaces, and recreational areas like the Świętokrzyski National Park. In sports, the city is known as the home of the top-tier handball club, multiple Polish Champion, and one-time EHF Champions League winner Iskra Kielce.

== Etymology ==
According to a local legend, Mieszko II Lambert, son of Boleslaus I of Poland, while hunting, stopped to rest and refresh, and fell asleep. During his sleep, he had a dream he was attacked by a band of brigands in a forest. In the dream he saw a vision of Saint Adalbert who drew a winding line which turned into a stream. When Mieszko woke up, he found the Silnica River whose waters helped him regain strength. He also discovered white tusks of an animal, perhaps wild boar. Mieszko announced he would build a town and a church to St. Adalbert at that site. According to this legend, the town's name Kielce commemorates the mysterious tusks (kieł in Polish). Various other legends exist to explain the name's origin. One states that the town was named after its founder who belonged to the noble family of Kiełcz, while another claims that it stems from the Celts who may have lived in the area in previous centuries. Other theories connect the town's name to occupational names relating to mud huts, iron tips for arrows and spears, or the production of tar (pkielce, a settlement of tar makers).

The most probable etymology traces the origins of the name to an Old Polish noun kielce (plural form of kielec 'sprout') and refers to plants sprouting in the wetlands where the settlement was located. The earliest extant document referring to the settlement by the name of Kielce dates to 1213.

== History ==
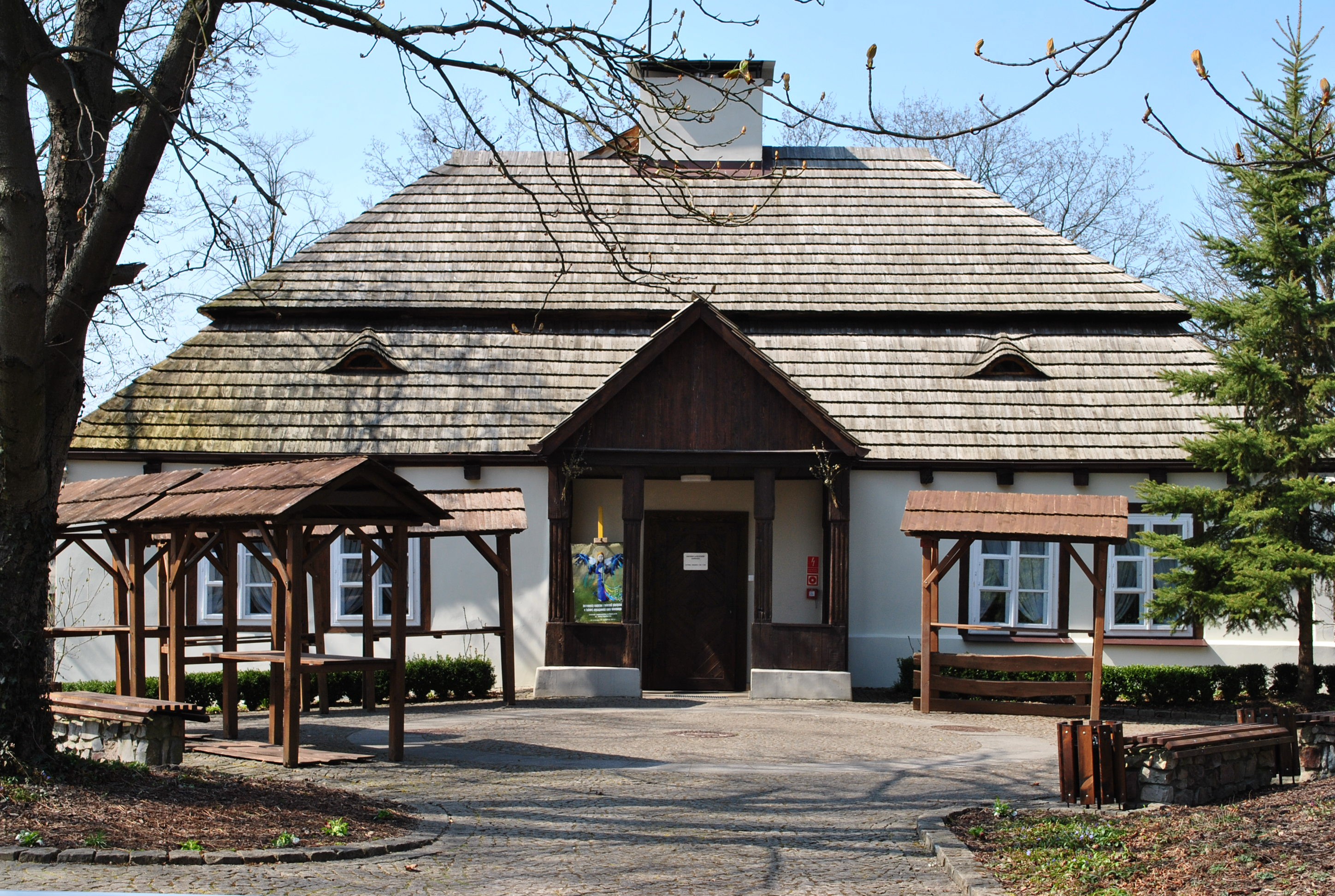
A typical Polish manor house called dworek, dating back to the Polish–Lithuanian Commonwealth. The pictured house is one of the city's most precious buildings

The area of Kielce has been inhabited since at least the 5th century BC. Until the 6th or 7th century, the banks of the Silnica were inhabited by Celts. They were driven out by a Lechitic tribe of Vistulans who started hunting in the nearby huge forests and had settled most of the area now known as Lesser Poland and present-day Świętokrzyskie Voivodeship. The lands of Wiślanie were at first subdued by Bohemia, however they soon came under the control of the Piast dynasty and became a part of the emerging Polish state.

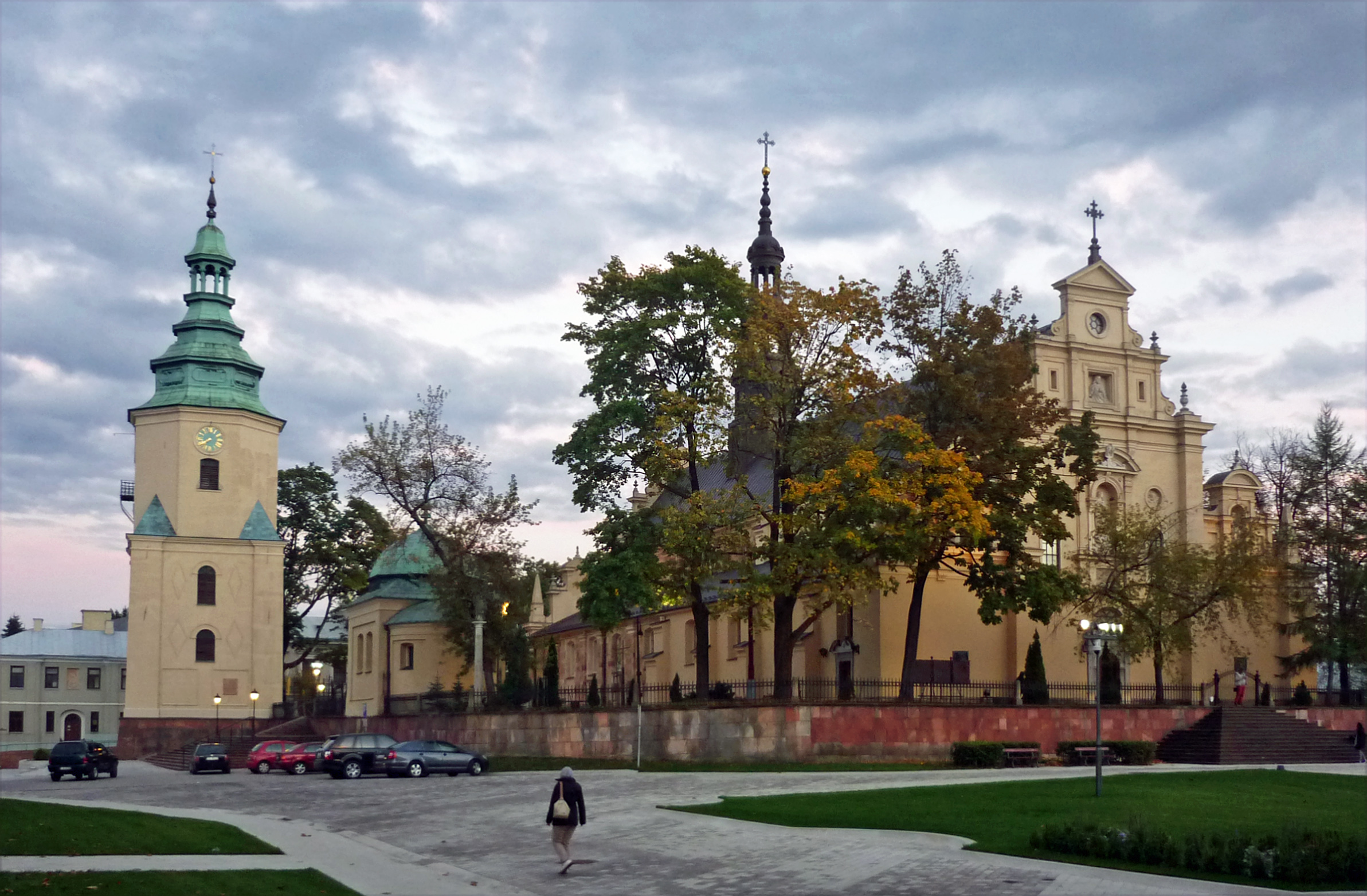
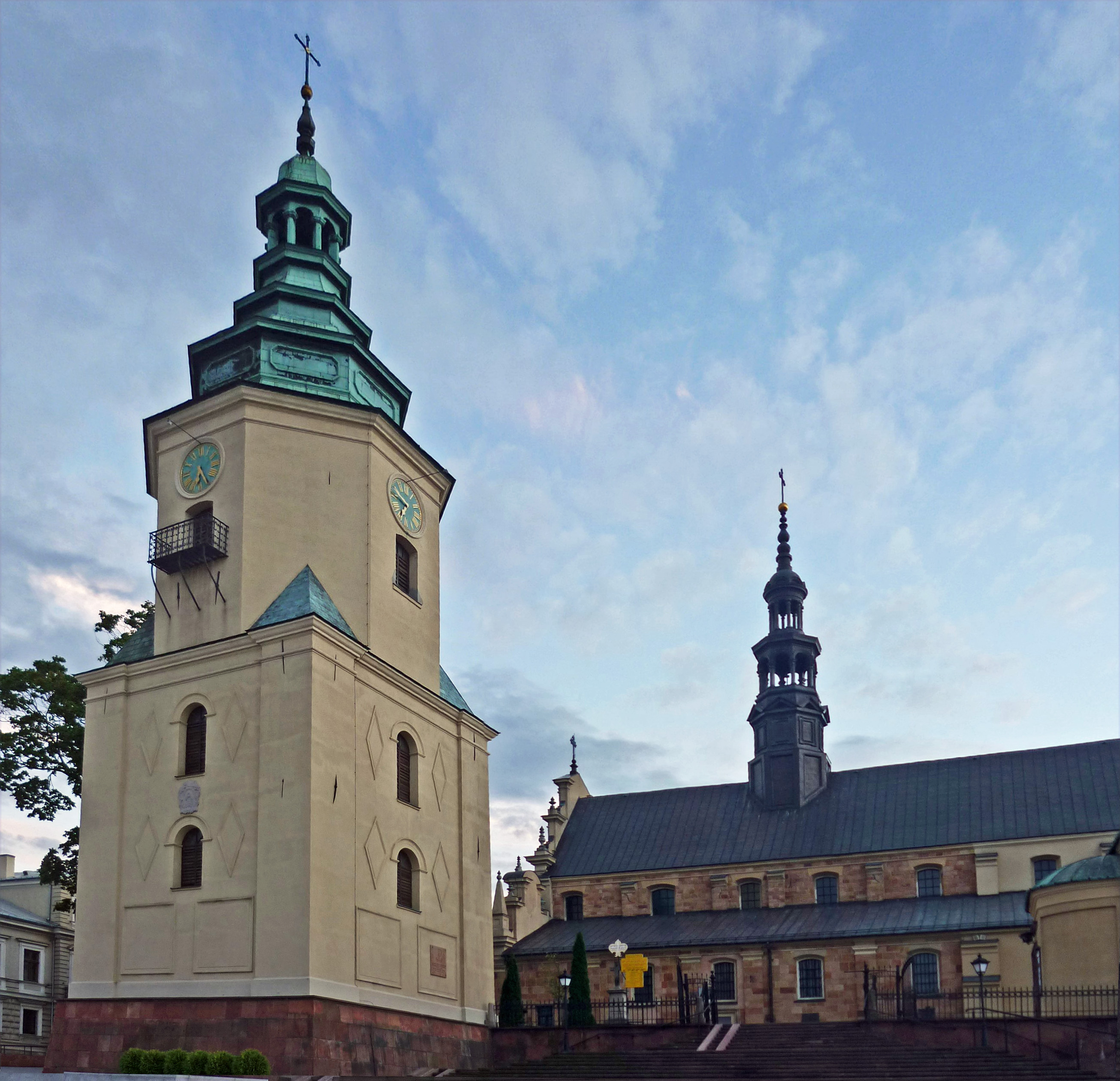
Kielce Cathedral is the city's landmark. A carillon was installed within the cathedral's bell tower

The area of the Holy Cross Mountains was almost unpopulated until the 11th century when the first hunters established permanent settlements at the outskirts of the mountains. They needed a place to trade furs and meat for grain and other necessary products, and so the market of Kielce was formed. In the early 12th century the new settlement became a property of the Bishops of Kraków, who built a wooden church and a manor. In 1171 a stone church was erected by bishop Gedeon Gryf. During the times of Wincenty Kadłubek a parochial school in Kielce was opened in 1229. By 1295 the town was granted city rights. In the mid-13th century the town was destroyed by the Mongol invasion of Ögedei Khan, but it quickly recovered.

Within the Polish Kingdom, Kielce was administratively located in the Sandomierz Voivodeship in the Lesser Poland Province. The area around Kielce was rich in minerals such as copper ore, lead ore, and iron, as well as limestone. In the 15th century Kielce became a significant centre of metallurgy. There were also several glass factories and armourer shops in the town. In 1527 bishop Piotr Tomicki founded a bell for the church and between 1637 and 1642 Mannerist palace was erected near the market place by Bishop Jakub Zadzik. It is one of the very few examples of French Renaissance architecture in Poland and the only example of a magnate's manor from the times of Vasa dynasty to survive World War II.

During the Deluge the town was pillaged and burnt by the Swedes. Only the palace and the church survived, but the town managed to recover under the rule of bishop Andrzej Załuski. During the Great Northern War it was the site of a battle between Swedish forces under Charles XII and Polish and Saxon forces under the Polish-Lithuanian king Augustus II. By 1761 Kielce had more than 4,000 inhabitants. In 1789 Kielce were nationalized and the burgers were granted the right to elect their own representatives in Sejm. The 3rd Infantry Regiment of the Polish Crown Army was stationed in Kielce in 1789. Until the end of the century the city's economy entered a period of fast growth. A brewery was founded as well as several brick factories, a horse breeder, hospital.

=== Foreign partitions of Poland ===
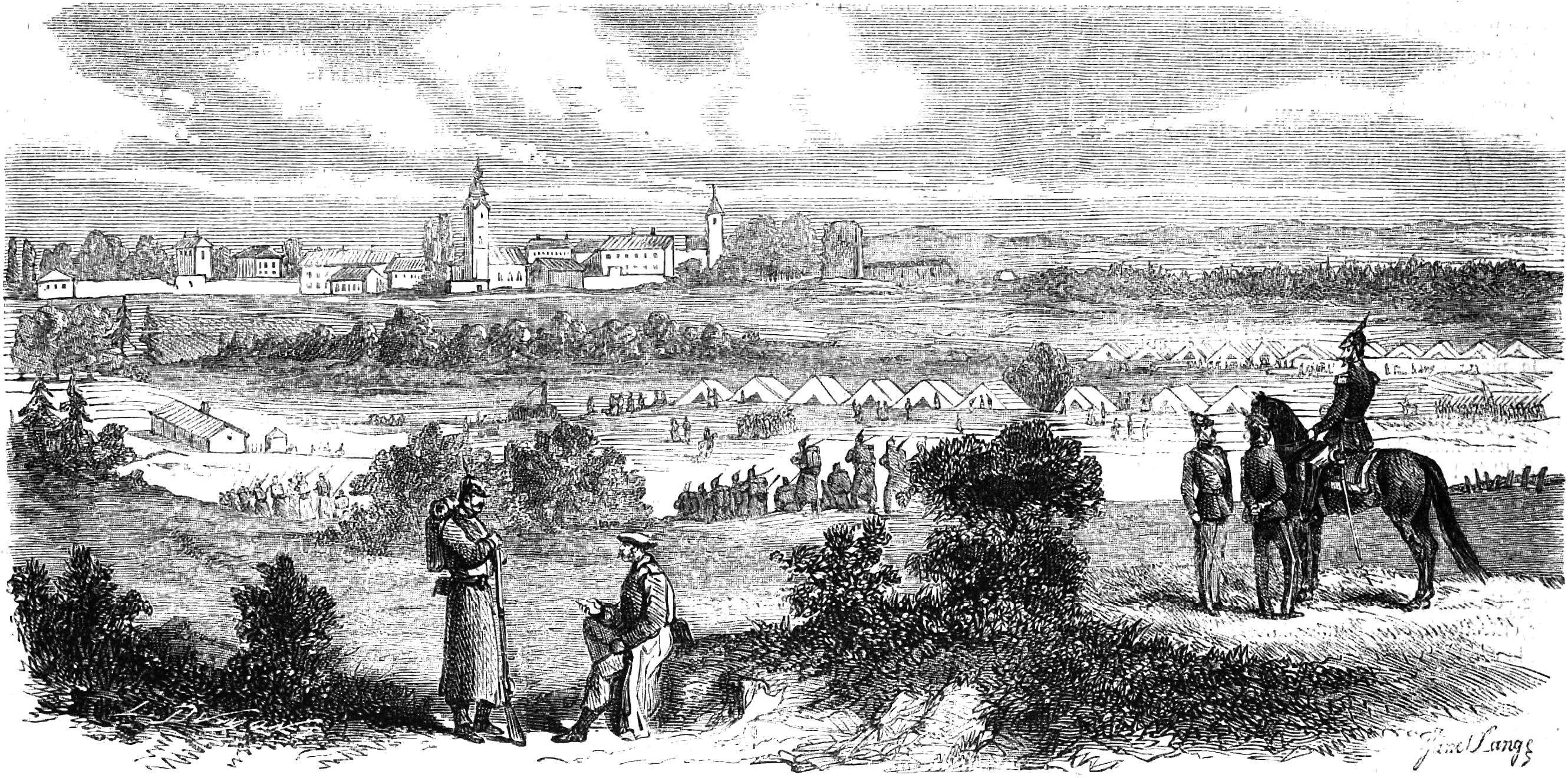
Camp of the Russian Imperial Army near Kielce during the January Uprising, 1863

As a result of the Third Partition of Poland the city was annexed by Austria. During the Austro-Polish War of 1809 it was captured by prince Józef Poniatowski and joined with the Napoleon controlled Duchy of Warsaw, but after the fall of Napoleon Bonaparte in 1815 it was joined with Russian-controlled Congress Poland. For a brief period when Kraków was an independent city-state (Republic of Kraków), Kielce became the capital of the Kraków Voivodeship. Thanks to the efforts by Stanisław Staszic Kielce became the centre of the newly established Old-Polish Industrial Zone (Staropolski Okręg Przemysłowy). The town grew quickly as new mines, quarries and factories were constructed. In 1816 the first Polish technical university was founded in Kielce. However, after Staszic's death the Industrial Zone declined and in 1826 the school was moved to Warsaw and became the Warsaw University of Technology.

In 1830 many of the inhabitants of Kielce took part in the November Uprising against Russia. In 1844, priest Piotr Ściegienny began organising a local revolt to liberate Kielce from the Russian yoke, for which he was sent to Siberia. In 1863 Kielce took part in the January Uprising. As a reprisal for insubordination the tsarist authorities closed all Polish schools and turned Kielce into a military garrison city. The Polish language was banned. Because of these actions many gymnasium students took part in the 1905 Revolution and were joined by factory workers.

=== Sovereign Poland ===
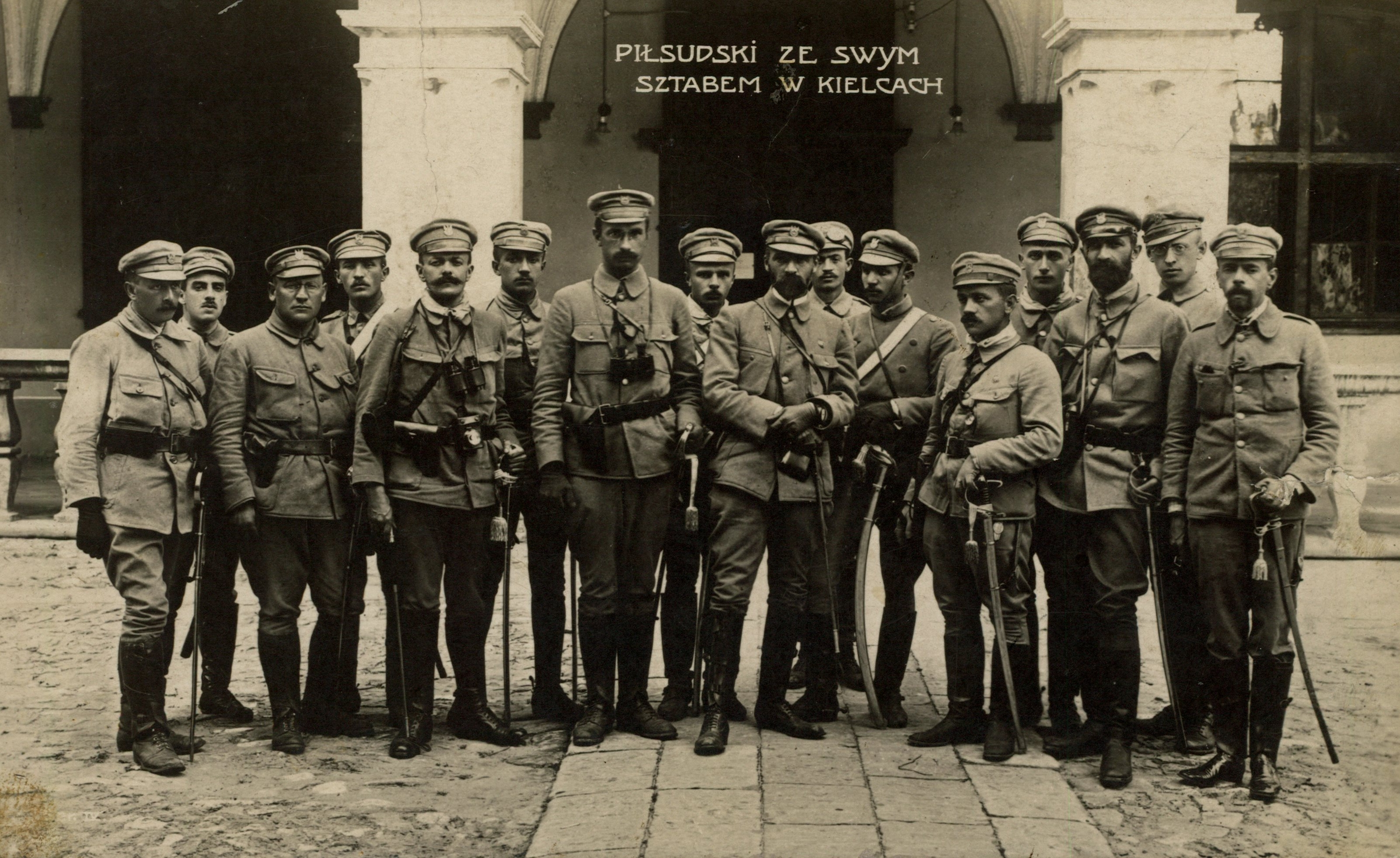
Józef Piłsudski with the Polish Legions in Kielce, in front of the Palace, 1914

After the outbreak of World War I, Kielce was the first Polish city to be liberated from Russian rule by the Polish Legions under Józef Piłsudski. After the war when Poland regained its independence after 123 years of Partitions, Kielce became the capital of Kielce Voivodeship. The plans to strengthen Polish heavy and war industries resulted in Kielce becoming one of the main nodes of the Central Industrial Area (Centralny Okręg Przemysłowy). The town housed several big factories, among them the munitions factory "Granat" and the food processing plant "Społem".

=== Second World War ===
During the Polish Defensive War of 1939, the main portion of the defenders of Westerplatte as well as the armoured brigade of General Stanisław Maczek were either from Kielce or from its close suburbs. During the German occupation that lasted for most of the Second World War, the city was an important centre of resistance. There were several resistance groups active in the town, including Armia Krajowa (AK) and Gwardia Ludowa (GL).

Following the invasion, the German Einsatzgruppe II entered the city to commit various atrocities against the population, and the occupiers established a special court in Kielce. In September–November 1939, the Germans also operated a temporary Dulag transit camp for some 3,000 Polish prisoners of war. The POWs were held in poor conditions, there were cases of dysentery and typhoid fever, and 18 POWs were executed by the Germans. Local Poles provided food and medicine to the POWs.

In January and March 1940, the Germans carried out mass arrests of local Poles as part of the AB-Aktion. Among the victims were teachers, priests, and local political and social activists, including women. Arrested Poles were either imprisoned in the local prison, deported to concentration camps or massacred, with a notable massacre of 63 people committed by the Germans on 12 June 1940 at a local stadium. Many Poles from the prison in Kielce were also murdered in the Brzask forest near Skarżysko-Kamienna on 29 June 1940. At least five local Polish boy scouts were killed by the Germans during the war.

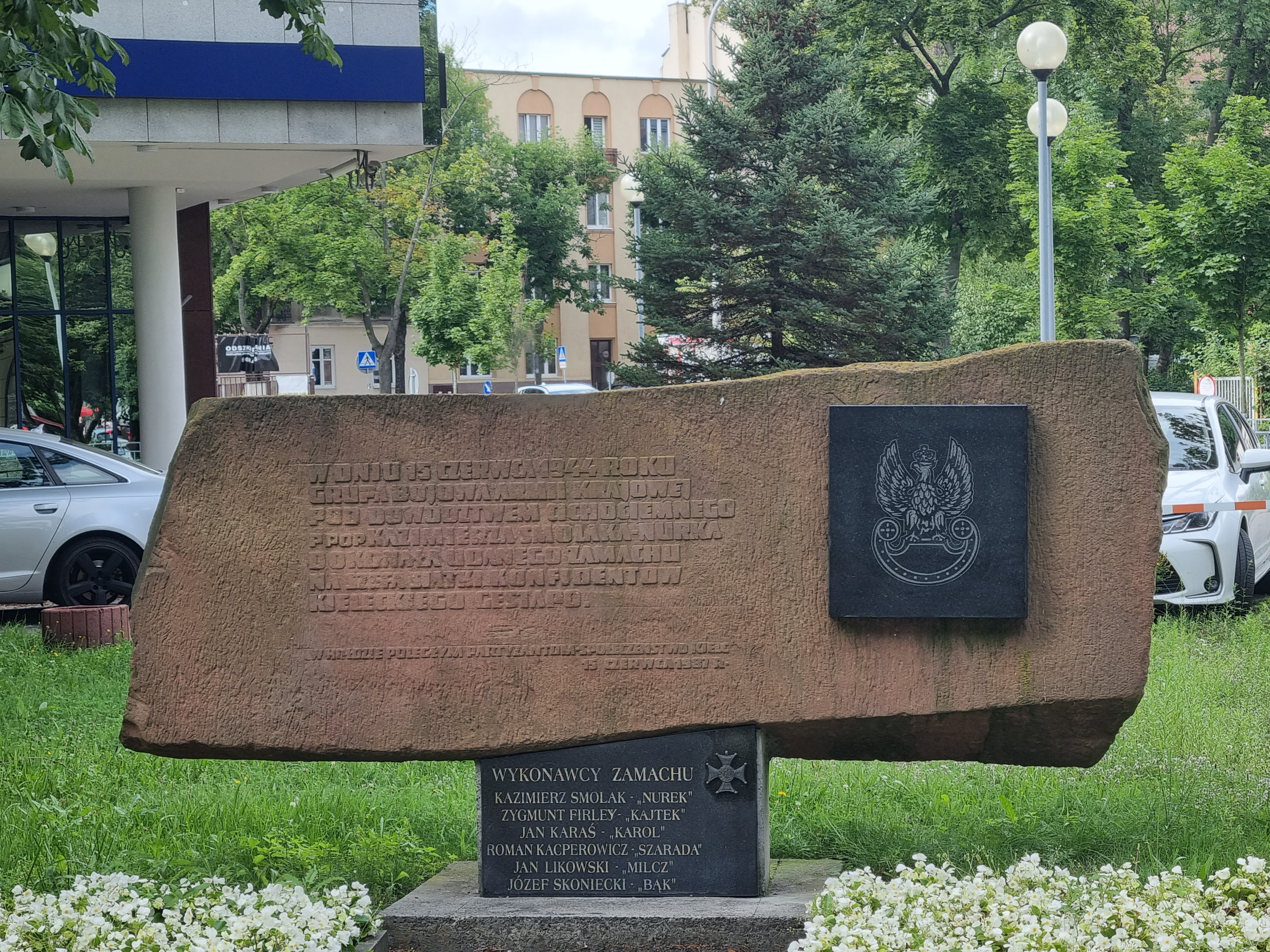
Monument to Polish partisans of World War II

Notable acts of resistance included theft of 2 tons of TNT from the "Społem" factory run by the Nazis, which were then used by the partisans to make hand grenades. Also, the daring escape from jail in Kielce of a dozen or so AK members, organized in November 1942 by Stanisław Depczyński. Not to mention, a grenade attack by a unit of the GL on the Smoleński coffee shop, killing 6 Germans including a major in the SS (February 1943), as well as the assassination of the noted Gestapo informant Franz Wittek on 15 June 1944, by a unit under Second Lt. Kazimierz Smolak on the corner of Solna and Paderewski Streets. One of the attackers died during the attack and a further four lost their lives not long afterwards. This was not the first assassination attempt against Wittek. In 1942, Henryk Pawelec fired at him in the market square, but his pistol misfired. In February 1943, a unit under the command of Stanisław Fąfar shot at Wittek by the Seminarium building. Wittek, though wounded by 14 bullets, survived. Successful assassinations of local collaborators, including the shooting of Jan Bocian took place in broad daylight at a shop in Bodzentyńska Street. Similar was the attack on the factory of C. Wawrzyniak in March 1943, terrorizing and disarming the volksdeutscher workers and destroying the machinery, as well as the attack on the HASAG factory in May 1943 and the takeover of the Kielce Herbskie railway station. The underground University of the Western Lands gave secret lectures in Kielce.

From 1942 to 1944, the Germans operated a collection camp for Soviet POWs, seen as potential collaborators.

In 1944, during and following the Warsaw Uprising, the Germans deported thousands of Varsovians from the Dulag 121 camp in Pruszków, where they were initially imprisoned, to Kielce. Those Poles were mainly old people, ill people and women with children. 9,000 Poles expelled from Warsaw stayed in Kielce, as of 1 November 1944.

Moreover, the hills and forests of Holy Cross Mountains became a scene of heavy partisan activity. A small town of Pińczów located some 30 kilometres (19 miles) from Kielce became the capital of the so-called Pinczów Republic, a piece of Polish land controlled by the partisans. The "Jodla" Świętokrzyskie Mountains Home Army fought against the Germans long before Operation Tempest inflicted heavy casualties on the occupying forces and later took part in the final liberation of their towns and cities in January 1945. During the war, many of inhabitants of Kielce lost their lives. Following the war, Kielce was restored to Poland, although with a Soviet-installed communist regime, which stayed in power until the 1980s. In August 1945, the Polish resistance led by Antoni Heda and Stefan Bembiński carried out the Raid on Kielce Prison and liberated some 350 prisoners.

=== Jewish history ===
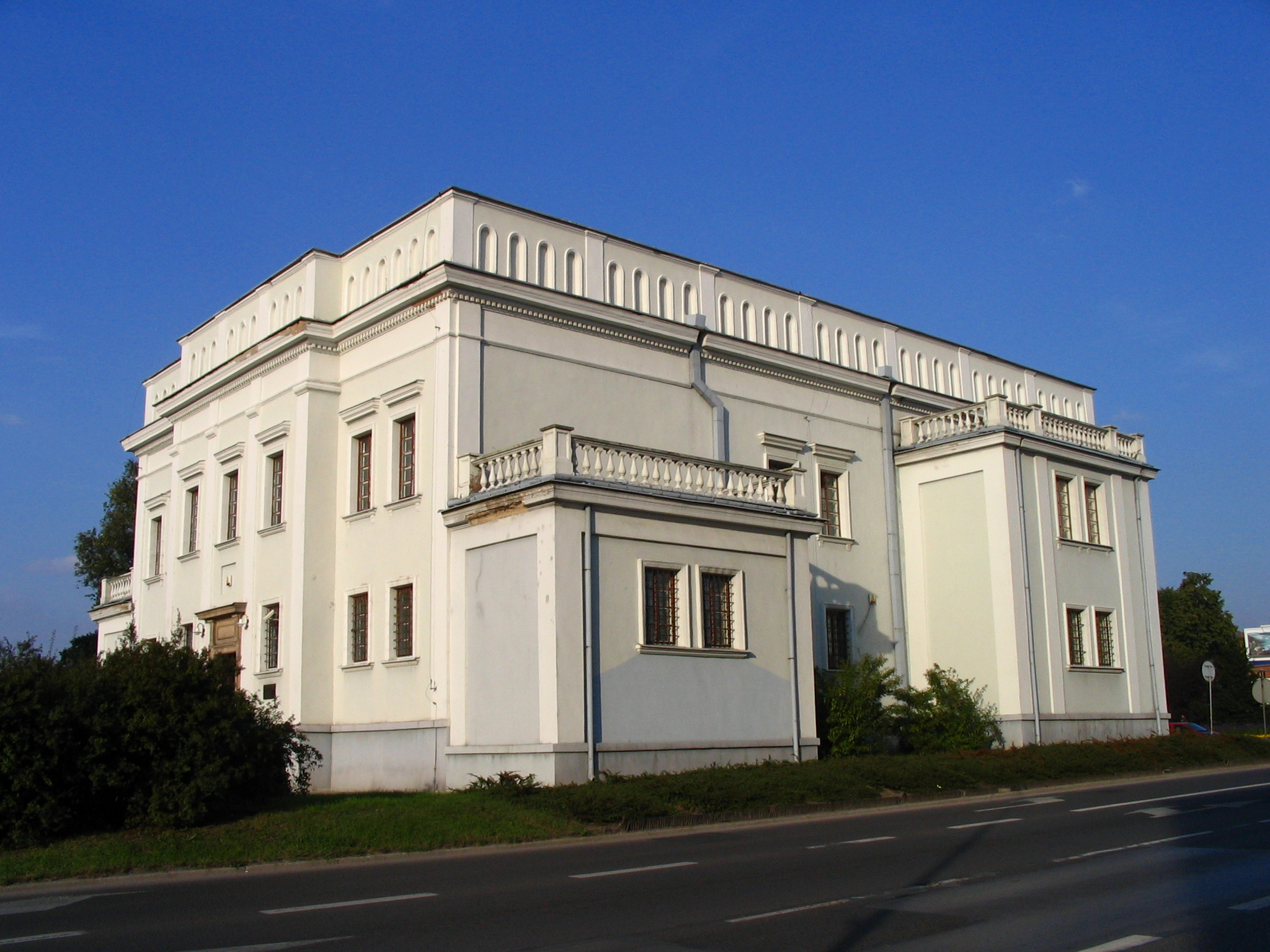
Kielce Synagogue, built 1903-1909

Prior to the 1939 Invasion of Poland, like many other cities across the Second Polish Republic, Kielce had a significant Jewish population. According to the Russian census of 1897, among the total population of 23,200 inhabitants, there were 6,400 Jews in Kielce (around 27 percent). On the eve of the Second World War there were about 18,000 Jews in the city. Between the onset of war and March 1940, the Jewish population of Kielce expanded to 25,400 (35% of all residents), with trains of dispossessed Jews arriving under the escort of German Order Police battalions from the Polish areas annexed by Nazi Germany.

Immediately after the German occupation of Poland in September 1939, all Jews were ordered to wear a Star of David on their outer garments. Jewish–owned factories in Kielce were confiscated by the Gestapo, stores and shops along the main thoroughfares liquidated, and ransom fines introduced. The forced labour and deportations to concentration camps culminated in mass extermination of Jews of Kielce during the Holocaust in occupied Poland.

In April 1941, the Kielce Ghetto was formed, surrounded by high fences, barbed wire, and guards. The gentile Poles were ordered to vacate the area and the Jews were given one week to relocate. The ghetto was split in two, along Warszawska Street (Nowowarszawska) with the Silnica River (pl) running through it. The so-called large ghetto was set up between the streets of Orla, Piotrkowska, Pocieszka, and Warszawska to the east, and the smaller ghetto between Warszawska on the west, and the streets of Bodzentyńska, St. Wojciech, and the St. Wojciech square. The ghetto gates were closed on 5 April 1941; the Jewish Ghetto Police was formed with 85 members and ordered to guard it. Meanwhile, expulsions elsewhere and deportations to Kielce continued until August 1942 at which time there were 27,000 prisoners crammed in the ghetto. Trains with Jewish families arrived from the entire Kielce Voivodeship, and also from Vienna, Poznań, and Łódź.

The severe overcrowding, rampant hunger, and outbreaks of epidemic typhus took the lives of 4,000 people before mid-1942. During this time, many of them were forced to work at a nearby German munition plant run by Hasag. In August 1942, the Kielce Ghetto was liquidated in the course of only five days. During roundups, all Jews unable to move were shot on the spot including the sick, the elderly, and the disabled; 20,000–21,000 Jews were led into waiting Holocaust trains, and murdered in the gas chambers of Treblinka. After the extermination action only 2,000 Jews were left in Kielce, lodged in the labour camp at Stolarska and Jasna Streets (pl) within the small ghetto. Those who survived were sent to other forced labour camps. On 23 May 1943 the Kielce cemetery massacre was perpetrated by the German police; 45 Jewish children who had survived the Kielce Ghetto liquidation, were murdered by Order Police battalions.

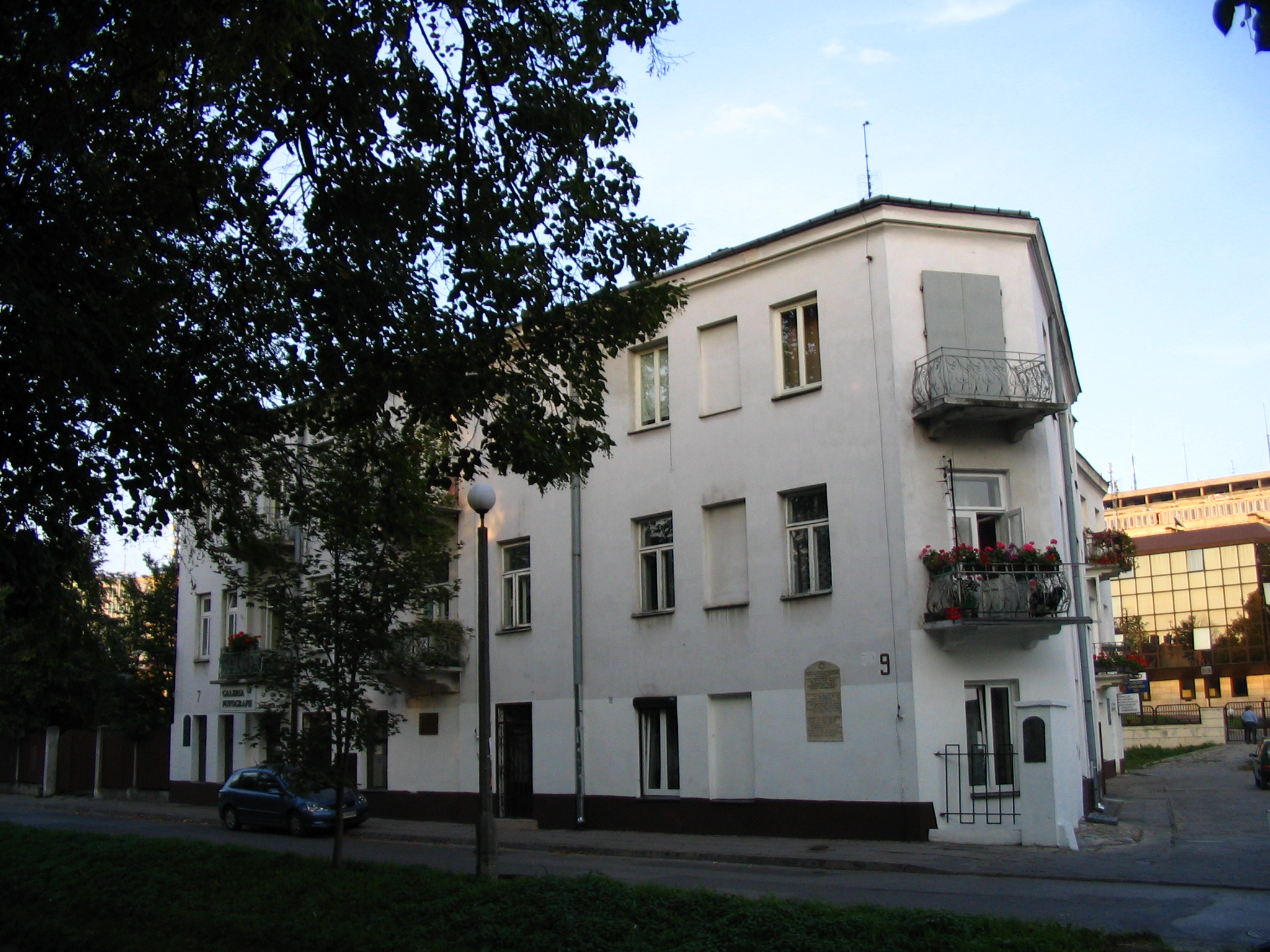
Building of the Kielce Jewish Committee and refugee centre on Planty Street

On 4 July 1946 the local Jewish gathering of some 200 Holocaust survivors from the Planty 7 Street refugee centre of the Zionist Union became the target of the Kielce pogrom in which 37 (40) Jews (17–21 of whom remain unidentified) and 2 ethnic Poles were killed, including 11 fatally shot with military rifles and 11 more stabbed with bayonets, indicating direct involvement of loyal to Moscow Polish communist troops.

During the Cold War, many Jewish historians theorized that the pogrom became the cause of outward Jewish emigration from Poland immediately following the opening of the borders in 1947. Nevertheless, the true reasons behind the dramatic increase of Jewish emigration from Poland were far more complex. The new government of the Communist Poland signed a repatriation agreement with the Soviet Union helping over 150,000 Holocaust survivors leave the Soviet Union legally. Poland was the only Eastern Bloc country to allow free and unrestricted Jewish Aliyah to the nascent State of Israel, upon the conclusion of World War II. After the Kielce pogrom Gen. Spychalski of PWP signed a legislative decree allowing the remaining survivors to leave Poland without visas or exit permits. Poland was the only Eastern Bloc country to do so, at war's end. Britain demanded from Poland (among others) to halt the Jewish exodus, but their pressure was largely unsuccessful.

== Geography ==
=== Climate ===
Kielce

Climate chart (precipitation, max. and min. temperature)
J	F	M	A	M	J	J	A	S	O	N	D
34 0 −5	29 1 −5	35 6 −2	39 14 3	53 19 8	71 21 11	81 24 13	77 23 12	56 19 8	42 13 4	40 6 0	44 1 −3
- █ Average max. and min. temperatures in °C
- █ Precipitation totals in mm
Imperial conversion
J	F	M	A	M	J	J	A	S	O	N	D
1.3 32 23	1.1 34 23	1.4 43 28	1.5 57 37	2.1 66 46	2.8 70 52	3.2 75 55	3 73 54	2.2 66 46	1.7 55 39	1.6 43 32	1.7 34 27
- █ Average max. and min. temperatures in °F
- █ Precipitation totals in inches

Kielce is one of the relatively cooler cities in Poland. It experiences four distinct seasons and has a warm summer subtype humid continental climate (Dfb), typical of this part of Europe. It has cool, cloudy winters with almost daily light snowfall and generally moderate temperatures within a few degrees of the freezing point, and moderately warm and sunny summers, with frequent but brief hot spells and abundant rainfall falling mostly during numerous and occasionally severe thunderstorms. Surrounded by the Holy Cross Mountains, however, the summer night time temperatures are somewhat cooler and the thunderstorms somewhat more frequent and severe than in surrounding areas of Poland.

Both continental and maritime air masses can enter the area undergoing little modification, resulting in striking differences in the seasons from year to year, particularly in winter when the contrast between maritime and continental air is at its greatest. Maritime influences from the Atlantic typically bring cool, cloudy, damp and often foggy weather both in summer and in winter, whereas continental air masses often result in long periods of sunny and dry weather, hot in summer and on occasion, extremely cold in winter.

The highest temperature recorded in Kielce since 1971 is 36.4 °C (98 °F) and the lowest is −33.9 °C (−29 °F), giving the city a temperature range of 70.3 °C (126.5 °F), the second highest in Poland. The city receives 1720 to 1829 hours of sunshine annually, depending on the source, with a notably sunny spring and summer, and a cloudy late autumn and winter. Winds are generally very light throughout the year, with an abundance of calm days, and as a result, cool temperatures often feel much milder than expected due to a relative lack of windchill, especially during sunny spells in early spring, as well as during severe winter cold snaps, which are typically dominated by calm, anticyclonic weather. Föhn winds from the Carpathian mountains do occasionally reach the city, resulting in unusually mild temperatures for a semi-continental location at this latitude, on rare occasions reaching approximately 15 °C (59 °F) in the winter months.

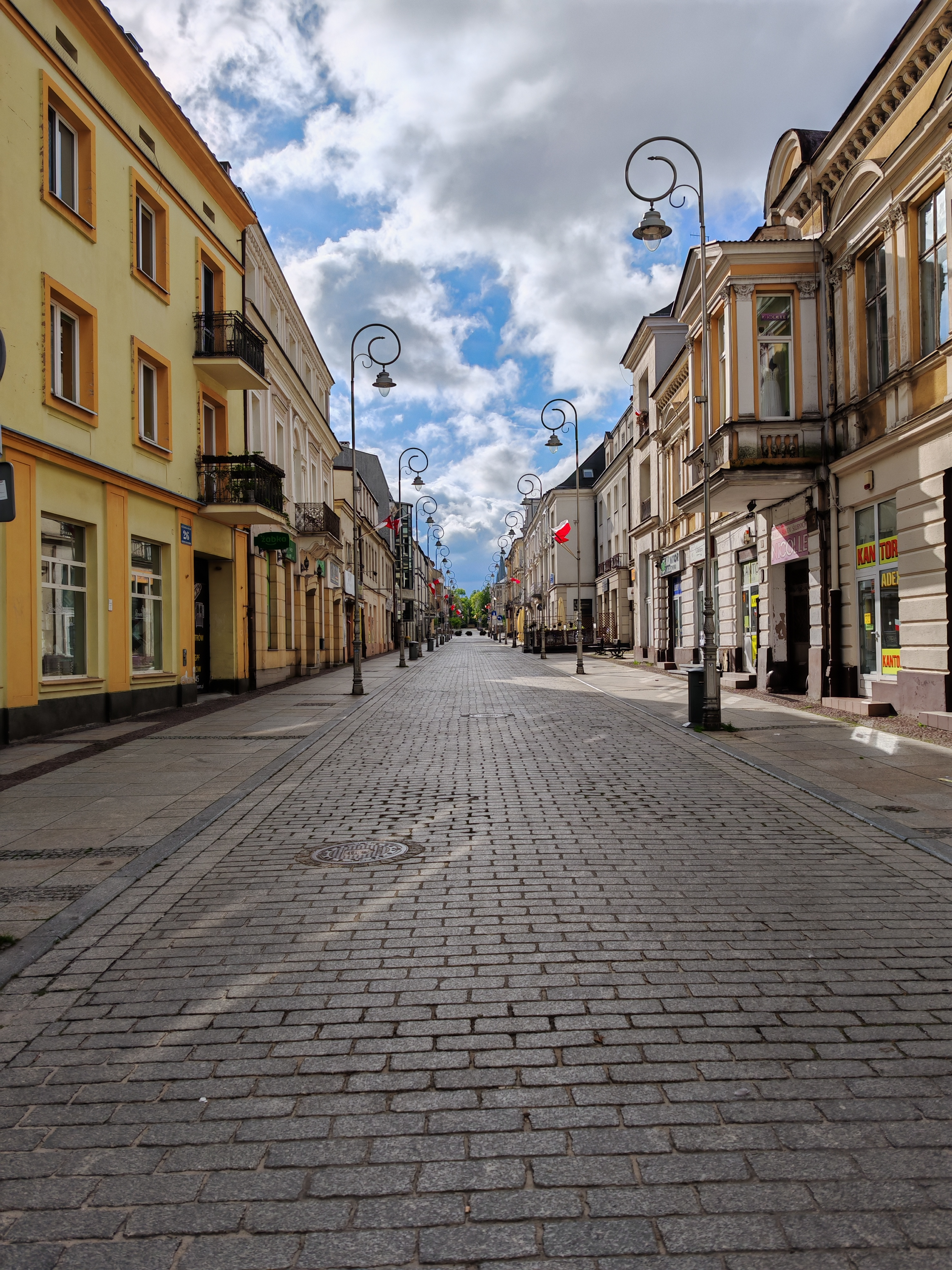
Sienkiewicza Street, summer 2025

Winter conditions are highly dependent on the source region of the air mass that dominates during a particular month, resulting in tremendous variability from one year to the next. For example, in January 2006, the city experienced typically continental winter weather, resulting in an average daytime high of −3.7 °C (25 °F), recording a nighttime low of −30 °C (−22 °F) on the 24th. The very next year, in January 2007, the weather was predominantly of the Atlantic type, resulting in an average high of 5.7 °C (42 °F) and occasional days above 10 °C (50 °F), more typical of coastal locations in Western Europe. As a result of this variability, severe cold with temperatures below −20 °C (−4 °F) can be completely absent during some winters, and in others, it can occur with regularity, even as late as March. Heavy snowfall is rare, and significant snow accumulations typically occur gradually, a few centimeters at a time over a protracted cold spell.

Summer is warm and lasts from June to early September, and is characterized by abundant sunshine, but also severe weather, particularly early in the season. Though temperatures average in the low-to-mid 20s (70s Fahrenheit), they are rather variable with frequent hot spells reaching approximately 30 °C (86 °F) interrupted by cold fronts, which frequently bring violent thunderstorms and several days of cool and sometimes chilly weather. Although hot weather is frequent and many summers experience a few oppressively hot days of around 35 °C (95 °F), summer temperatures in the city are never extreme and have not exceeded 36.4 °C (98 °F) in recent decades.

The transitional seasons of spring and autumn are highly unpredictable and experience large temperature swings with periods of fine weather and temperatures around 20 °C (68 °F) as early as March and late into October, alternating with much colder periods. Sharp nighttime frosts can occur as early as September and as late as May, though on calm, clear days, it often warms up rapidly to approximately 20 °C (68 °F), especially in April. Occasionally, significant, accumulating snow can occur in October and April, though mild weather rapidly returns.

Climate data for Kielce (Suków) 1991–2020 normals, extremes 1951–present
Month	Jan	Feb	Mar	Apr	May	Jun	Jul	Aug	Sep	Oct	Nov	Dec	Year
Record high °C (°F)	13.4 (56.1)	18.4 (65.1)	23.7 (74.7)	29.7 (85.5)	33.4 (92.1)	34.6 (94.3)	36.6 (97.9)	36.4 (97.5)	35.0 (95.0)	26.3 (79.3)	20.0 (68.0)	16.5 (61.7)	36.6 (97.9)
Mean daily maximum °C (°F)	0.8 (33.4)	2.6 (36.7)	7.4 (45.3)	14.4 (57.9)	19.4 (66.9)	22.7 (72.9)	24.9 (76.8)	24.6 (76.3)	19.0 (66.2)	13.1 (55.6)	6.6 (43.9)	1.9 (35.4)	13.1 (55.6)
Daily mean °C (°F)	−2.2 (28.0)	−1.1 (30.0)	2.5 (36.5)	8.4 (47.1)	13.4 (56.1)	16.9 (62.4)	18.7 (65.7)	18.2 (64.8)	13.2 (55.8)	8.1 (46.6)	3.3 (37.9)	−0.9 (30.4)	8.2 (46.8)
Mean daily minimum °C (°F)	−5.1 (22.8)	−4.4 (24.1)	−1.7 (28.9)	2.7 (36.9)	7.5 (45.5)	11.0 (51.8)	12.9 (55.2)	12.3 (54.1)	8.2 (46.8)	4.0 (39.2)	0.3 (32.5)	−3.6 (25.5)	3.7 (38.7)
Record low °C (°F)	−33.9 (−29.0)	−31.0 (−23.8)	−27.5 (−17.5)	−9.4 (15.1)	−4.6 (23.7)	−1.3 (29.7)	2.9 (37.2)	0.3 (32.5)	−4.5 (23.9)	−8.7 (16.3)	−18.0 (−0.4)	−26.9 (−16.4)	−33.9 (−29.0)
Average precipitation mm (inches)	37.3 (1.47)	34.0 (1.34)	40.2 (1.58)	39.5 (1.56)	70.1 (2.76)	70.2 (2.76)	94.3 (3.71)	67.6 (2.66)	55.1 (2.17)	45.2 (1.78)	40.2 (1.58)	37.4 (1.47)	631.0 (24.84)
Average extreme snow depth cm (inches)	8.1 (3.2)	8.2 (3.2)	5.2 (2.0)	1.4 (0.6)	0.0 (0.0)	0.0 (0.0)	0.0 (0.0)	0.0 (0.0)	0.0 (0.0)	0.7 (0.3)	2.6 (1.0)	4.3 (1.7)	8.2 (3.2)
Average precipitation days (≥ 0.1 mm)	17.13	15.43	14.73	12.13	14.03	13.83	14.73	11.77	12.23	14.30	15.03	16.17	171.53
Average snowy days (≥ 0 cm)	17.8	16.2	7.0	1.1	0.0	0.0	0.0	0.0	0.0	0.4	4.6	11.3	58.4
Average relative humidity (%)	87.4	84.4	78.4	71.6	73.2	73.7	74.2	74.8	80.7	84.9	89.2	89.4	80.2
Mean monthly sunshine hours	55.8	71.3	126.2	181.4	228.2	232.4	241.3	238.9	162.2	112.8	56.1	45.2	1,751.8
Source 1: Institute of Meteorology and Water Management
Source 2: Meteomodel.pl (records, relative humidity 1991–2020)

Sources: http://www.kzgw.gov.pl/ ClimateBase.ru, Tutiempo

== Tourist attractions ==
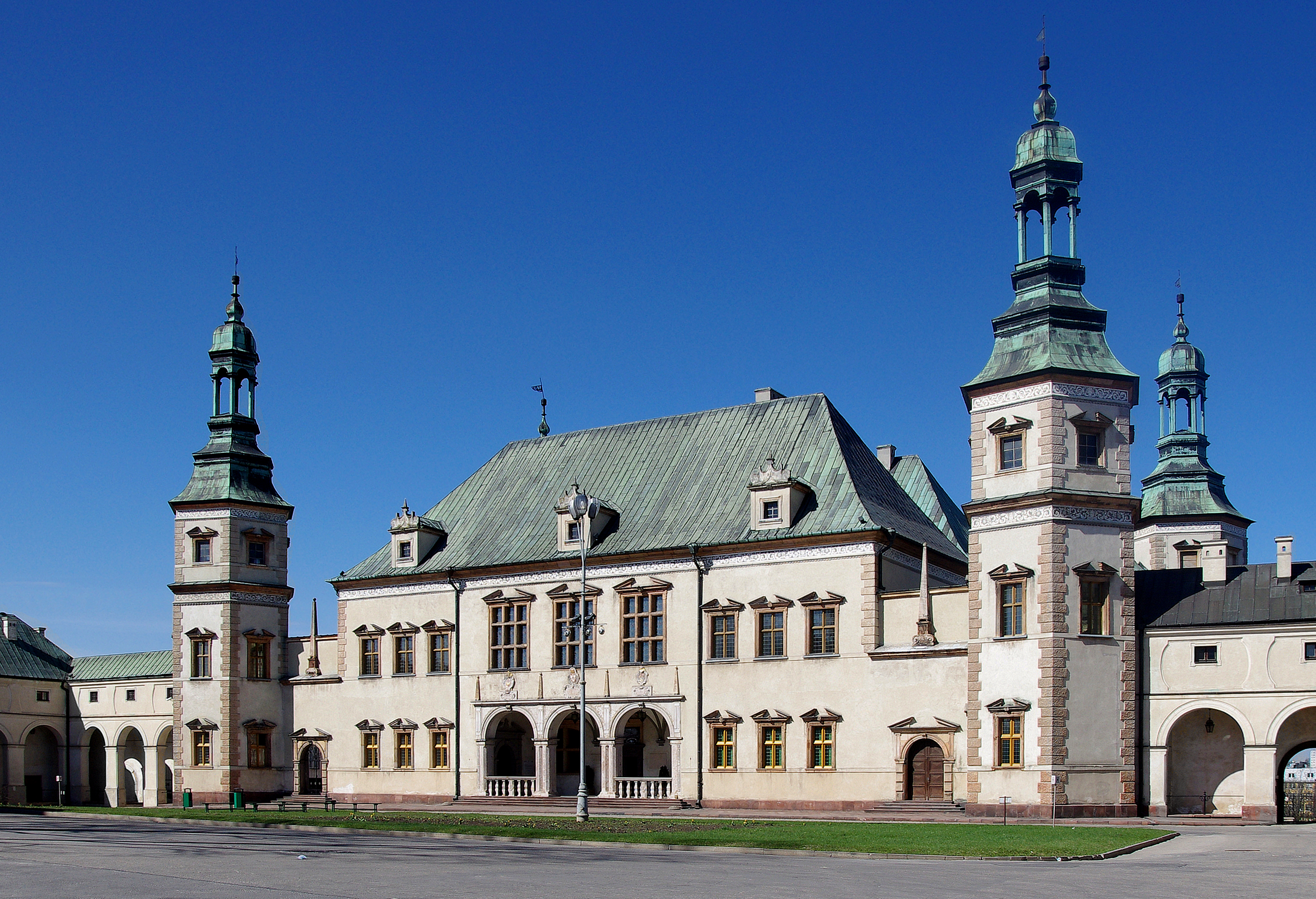
Palace of the Kraków Bishops in Kielce, front facade

- Palace of the Kraków Bishops in Kielce (1637–1641): summer residence of Bishops of Kraków, built in early baroque style by Giovanni Battista Trevano and Tomasz Poncino; houses a museum with an important gallery of Polish paintings
- Baroque Cathedral (12th century, rebuilt 1632–1635 and again in the 19th century)
- Old Town market (18th century) with the neoclassicist town hall
- Sienkiewicza Street
- Holy Trinity Church (1640–1644)
- St. Adalbert Church, dating back to 10th century, rebuilt in 1763 and 1885
- Tomasz Zieliński romantic manor (1846–1858)
- Former synagogue, built in 1902
- Garrison Catholic Church of Our Lady Queen of Poland, former Orthodox Church, built 1902–1904
- Exaltation of the Holy Cross church, built 1903–1913 in Gothic Revival style
- Bank building at 47 Sienkiewicza Street, built in 1911–1912 in Art Nouveau style
- Socialist realist building of the Jan Kochanowski University (former regional headquarters of the Polish United Workers' Party)
- Modernist bus station, built 1975–1984
- Monuments to Henryk Sienkiewicz, Józef Piłsudski, Tadeusz Kościuszko, Stefan Żeromski, Jan Karski, Stanisław Staszic, Jerzy Popiełuszko, Pope John Paul II, Miles Davis etc.
- Homo Homini monument, first monument in Europe to commemorate the victims of the September 11 attacks in New York City
- Geopark Kielce with the Center of Geoeducation
- 5 geological nature reserves in town area
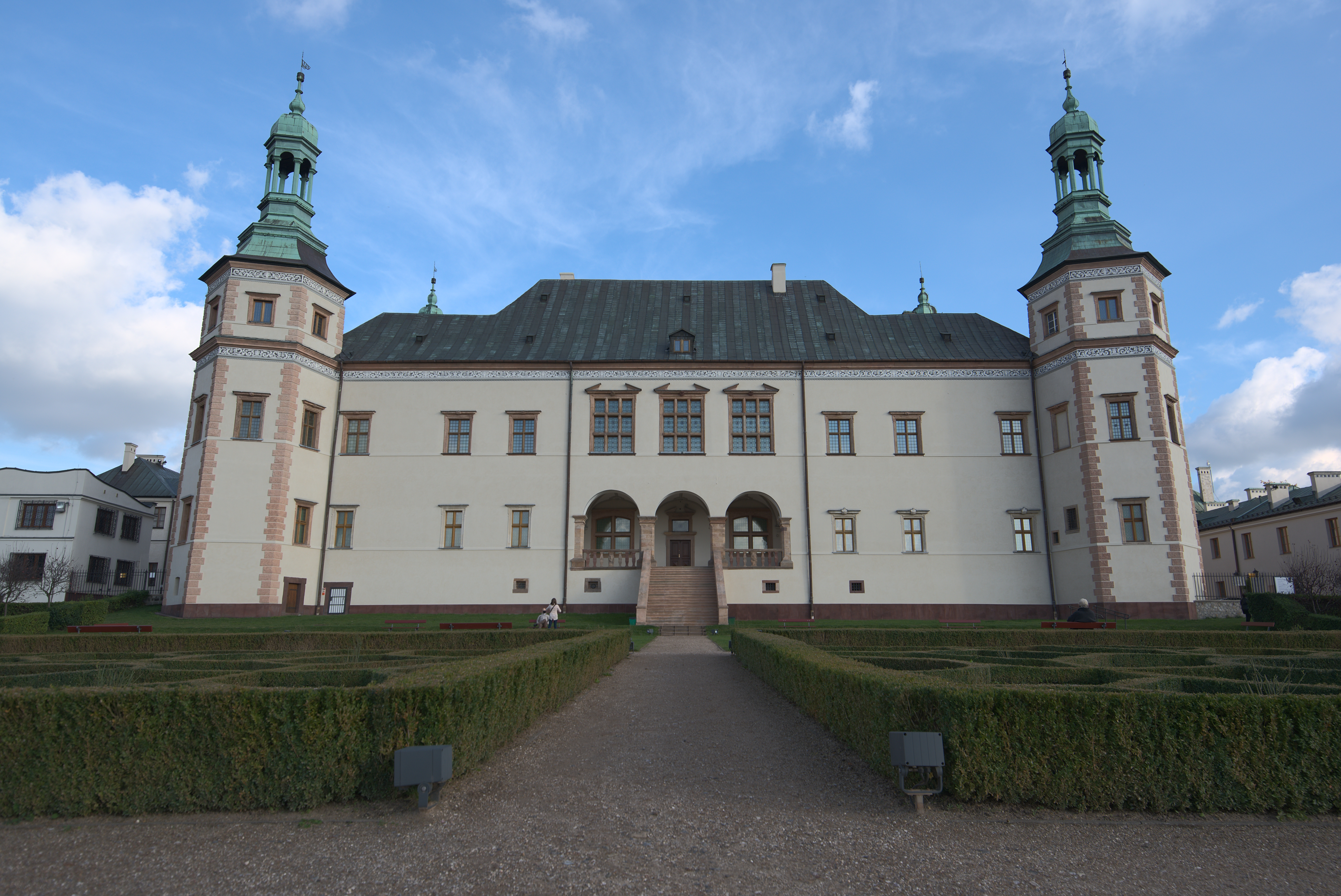
Palace of the Kraków Bishops in Kielce, garden facade

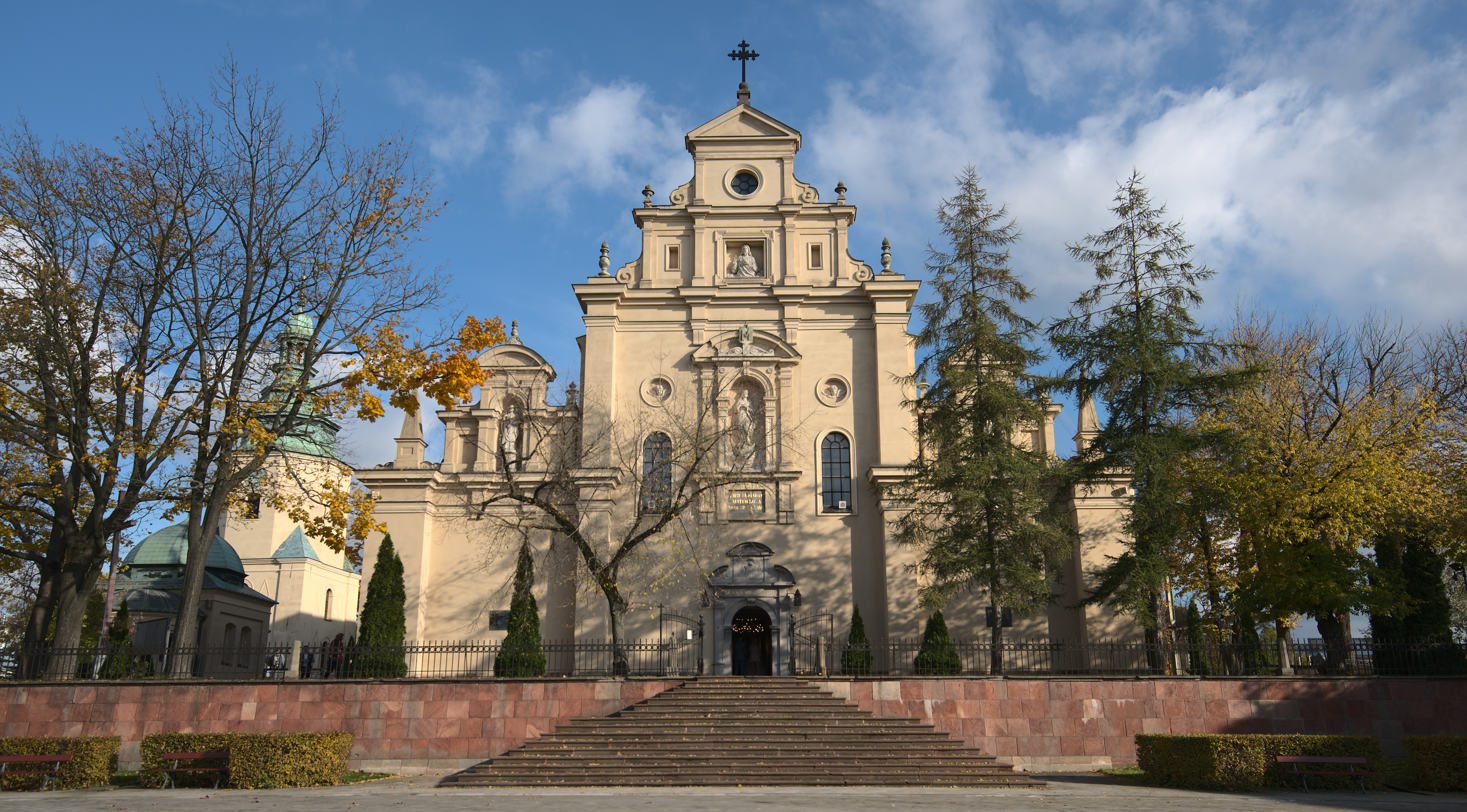
Kielce Cathedral

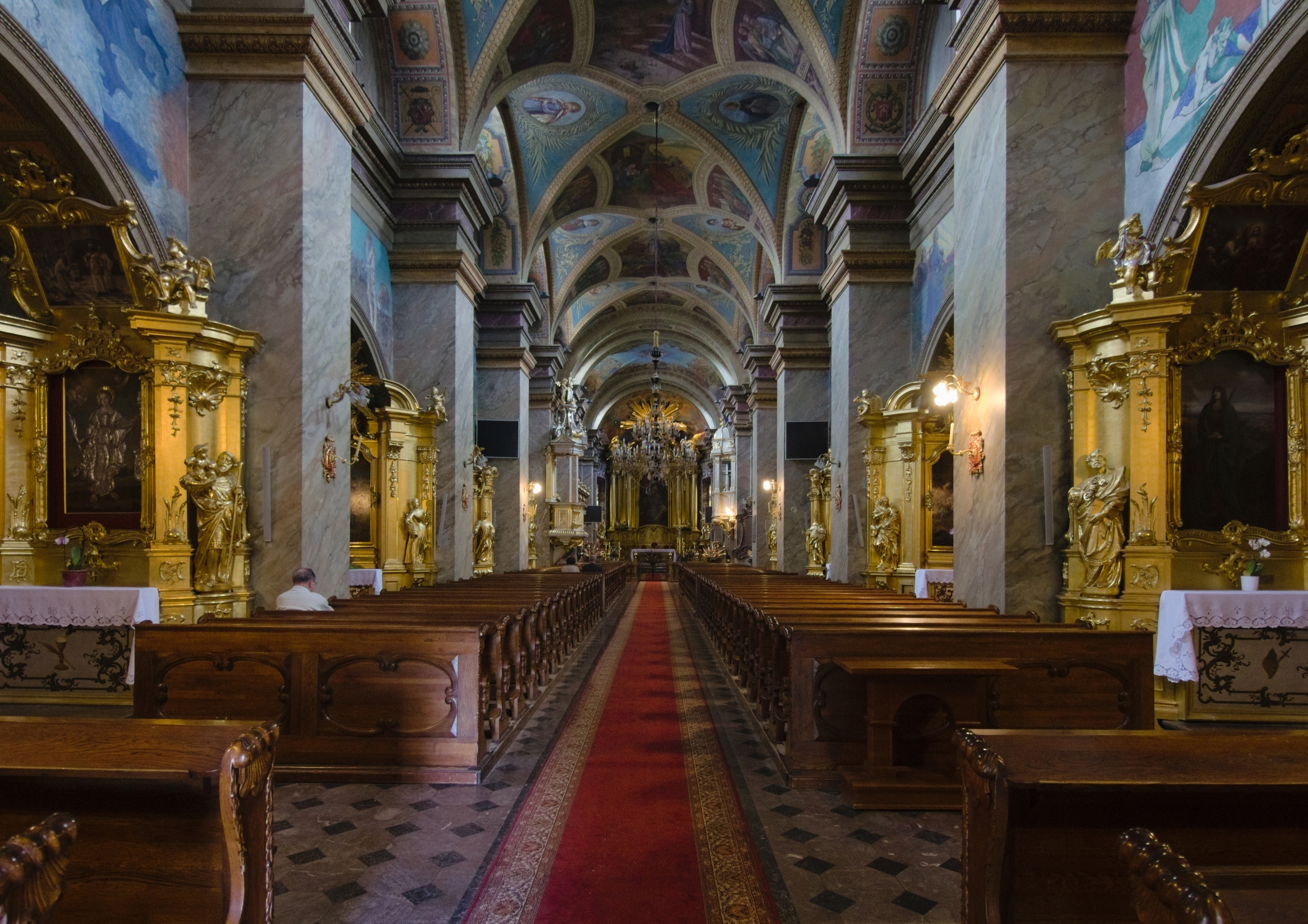
Cathedral interior

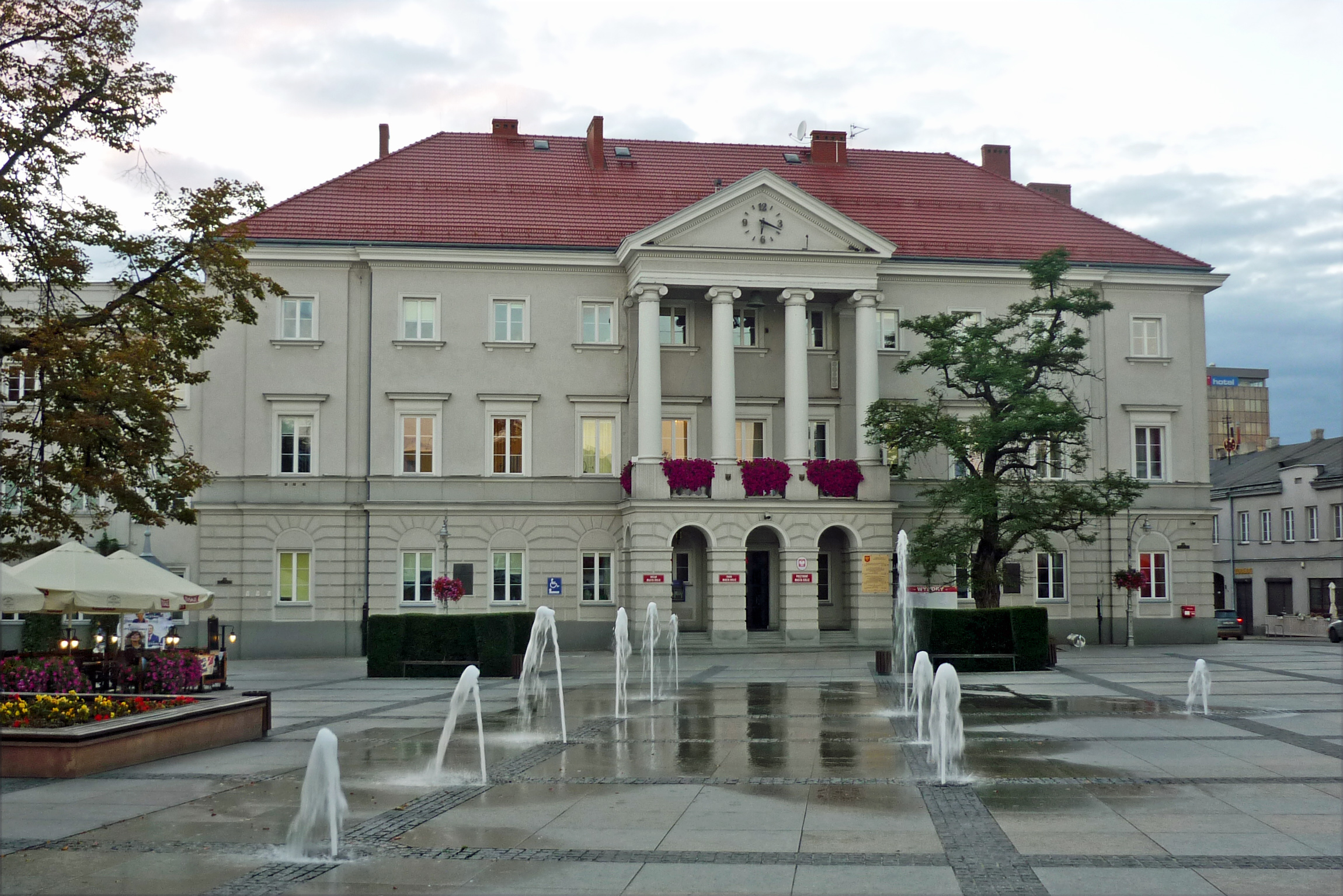
City hall on the Old Town Market Square

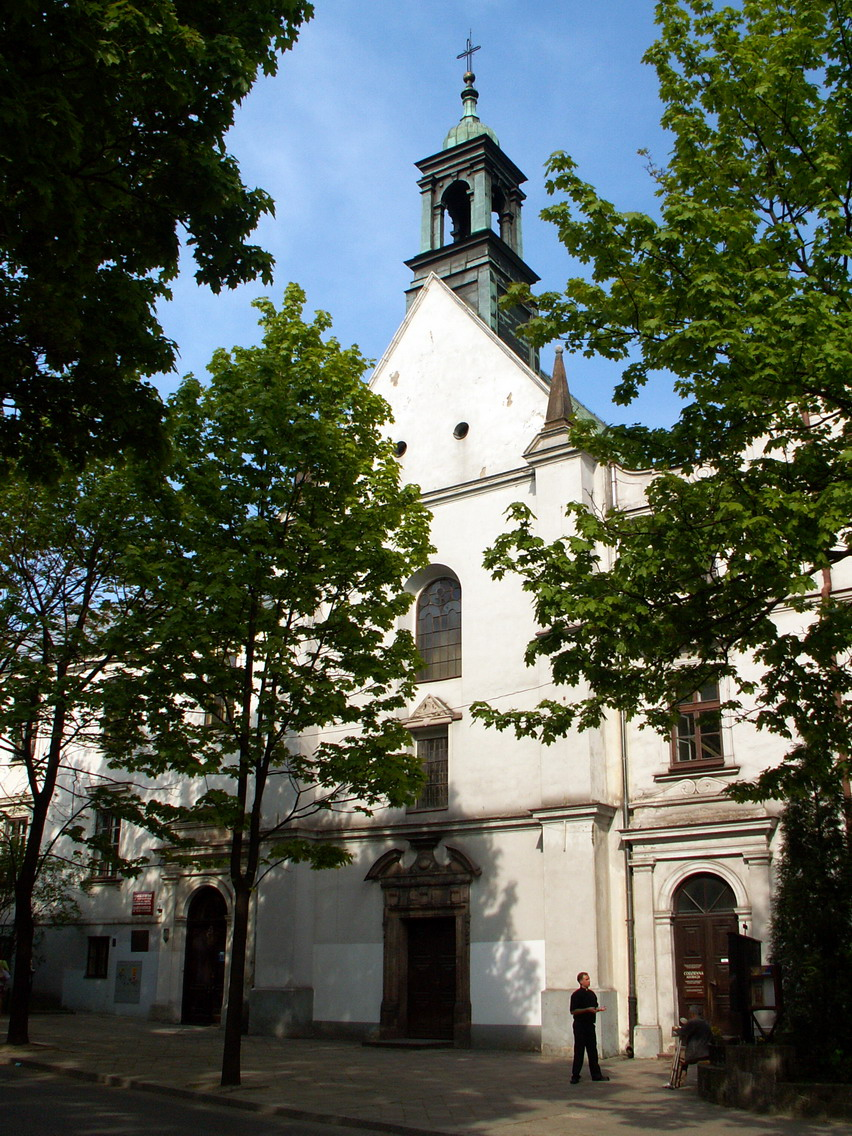
Holy Trinity Church

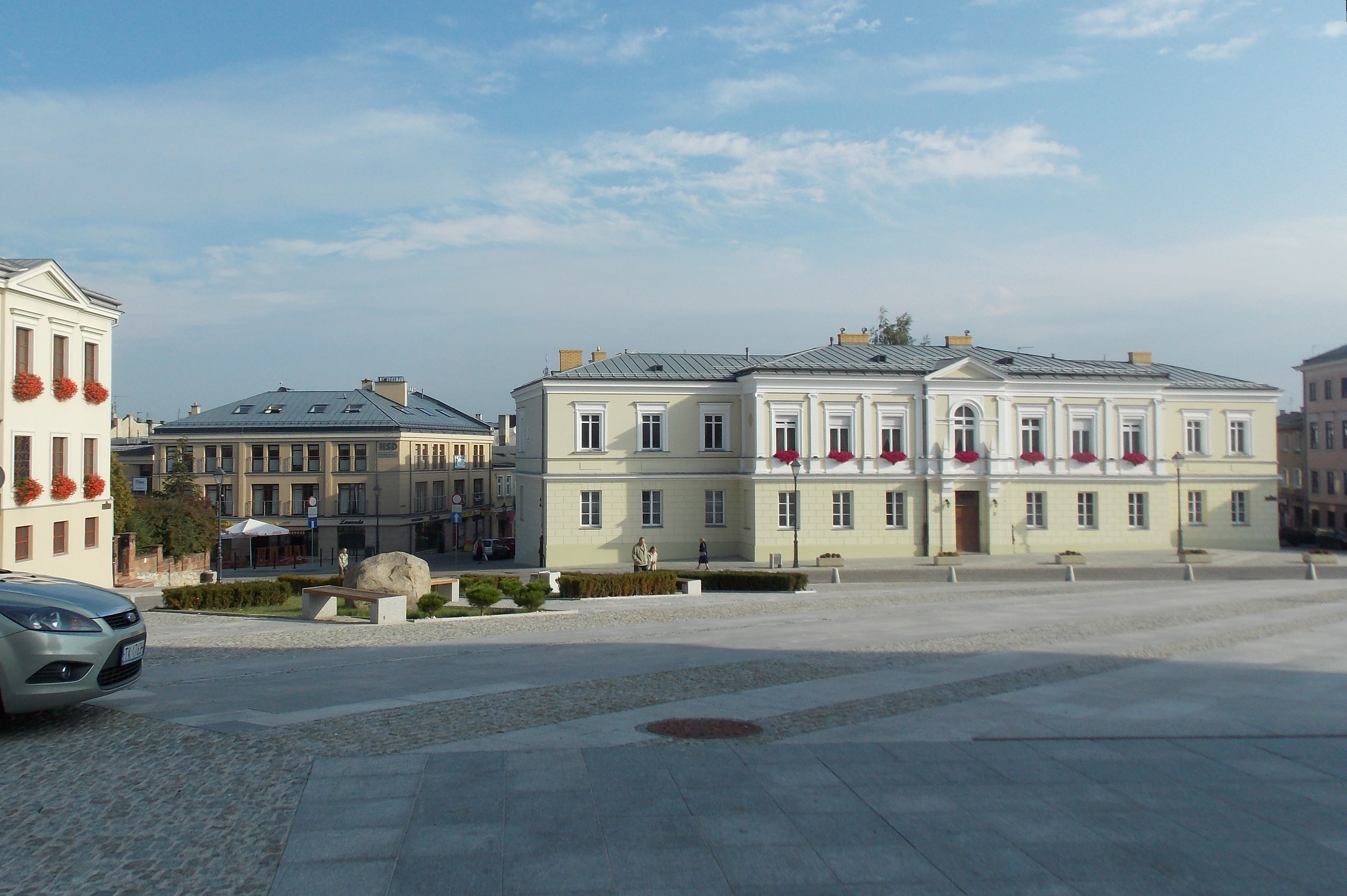
Square of the Blessed Virgin Mary

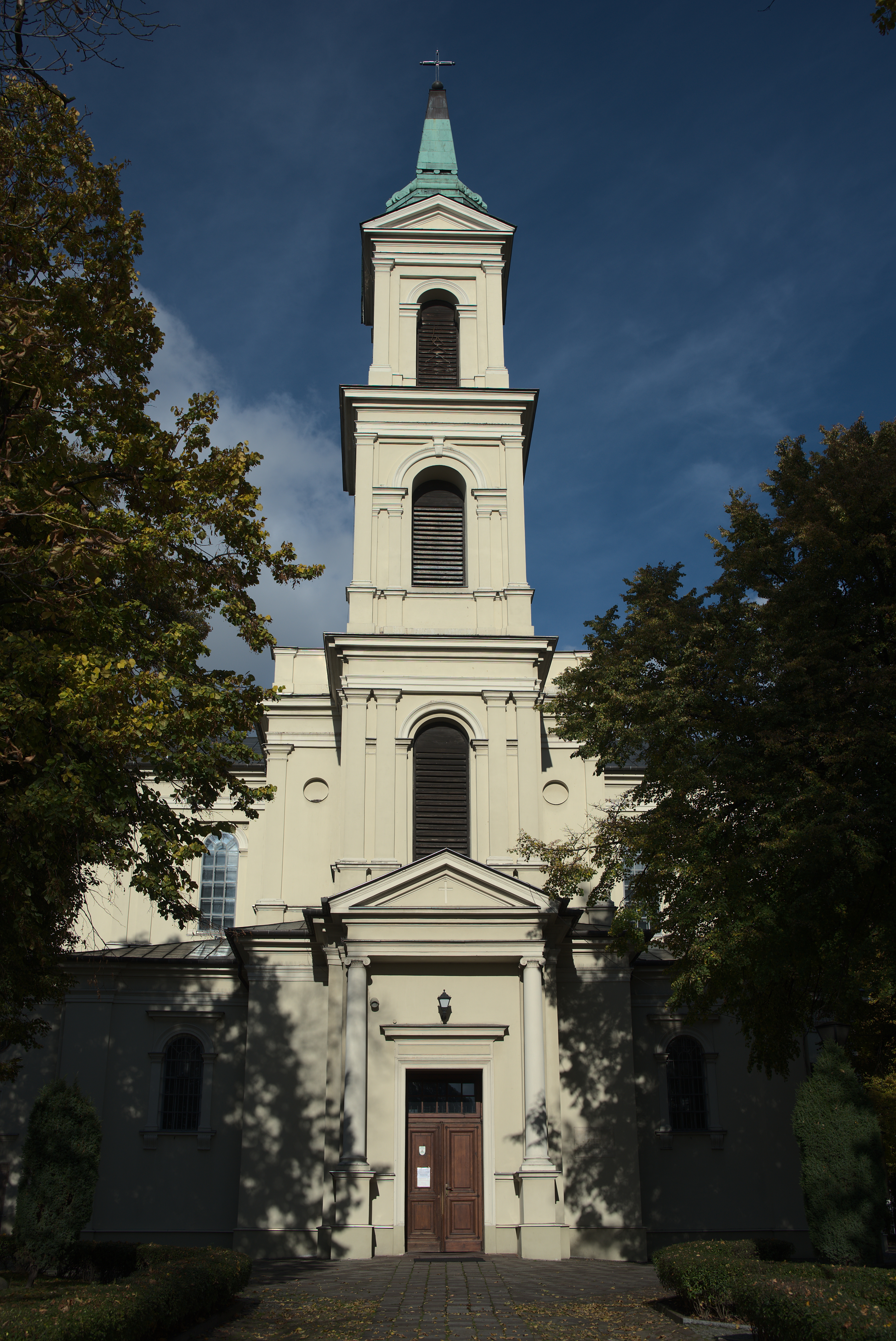
St. Adalbert Church

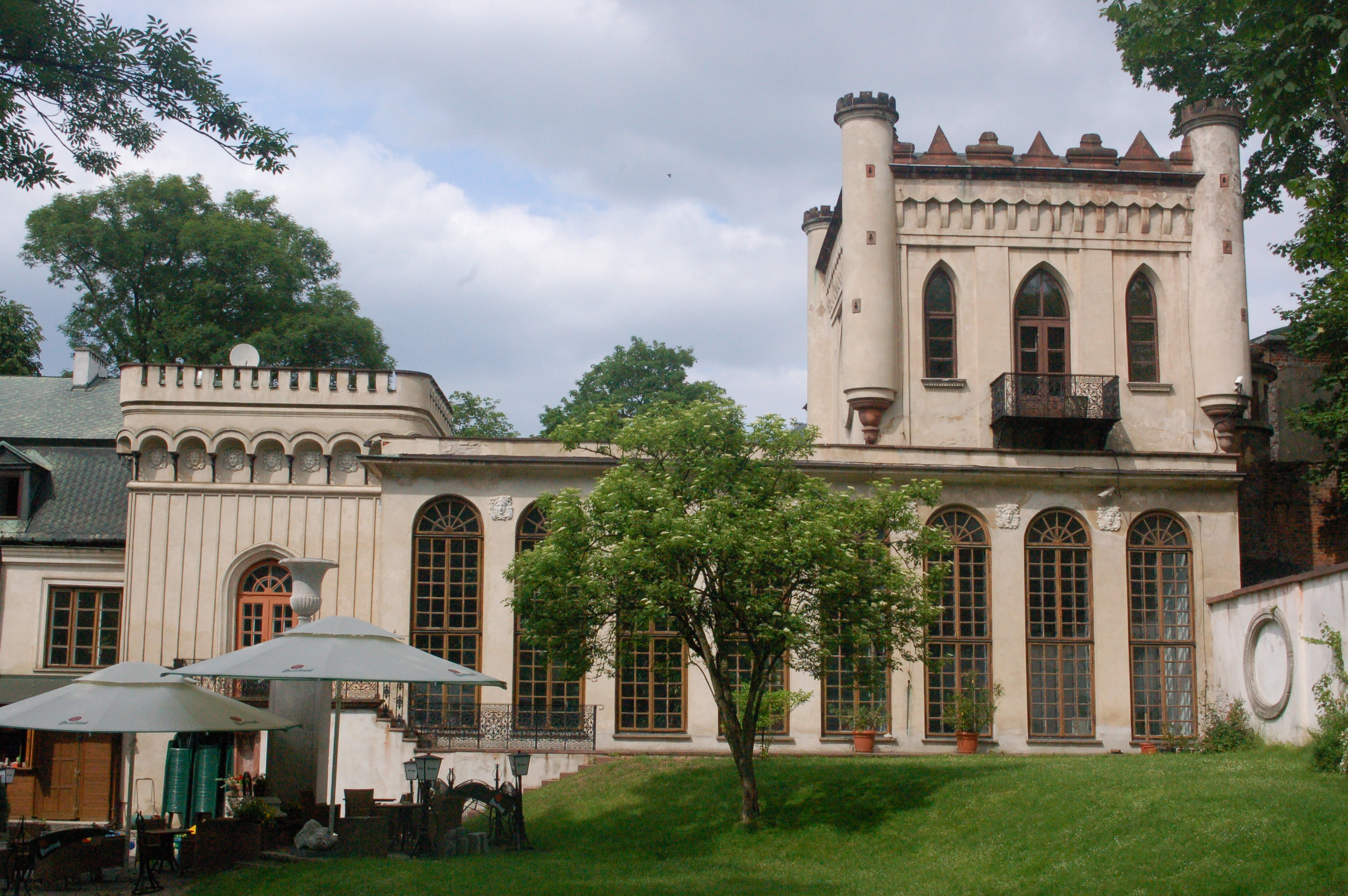
Tomasz Zieliński manor

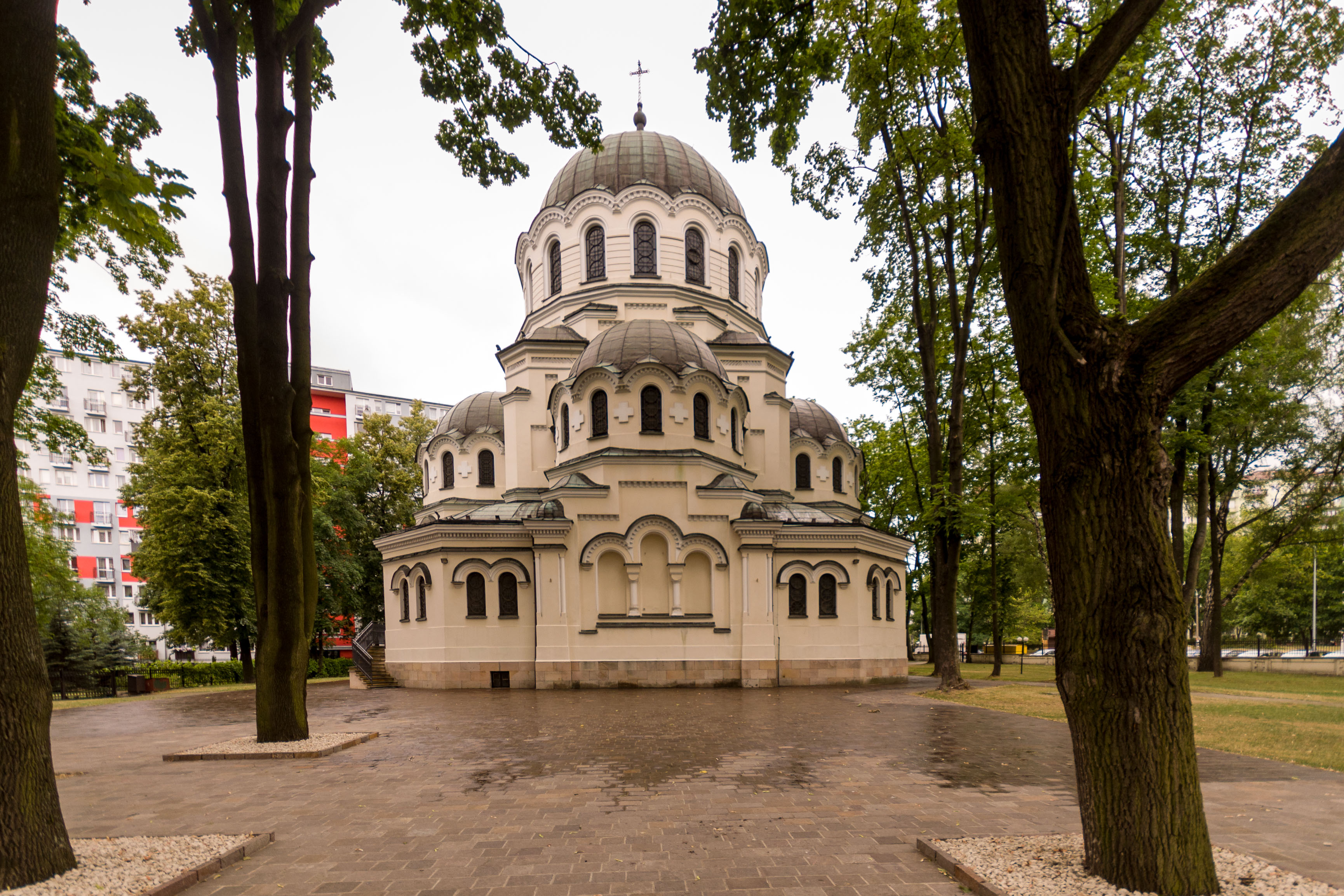
Church of Our Lady Queen of Poland

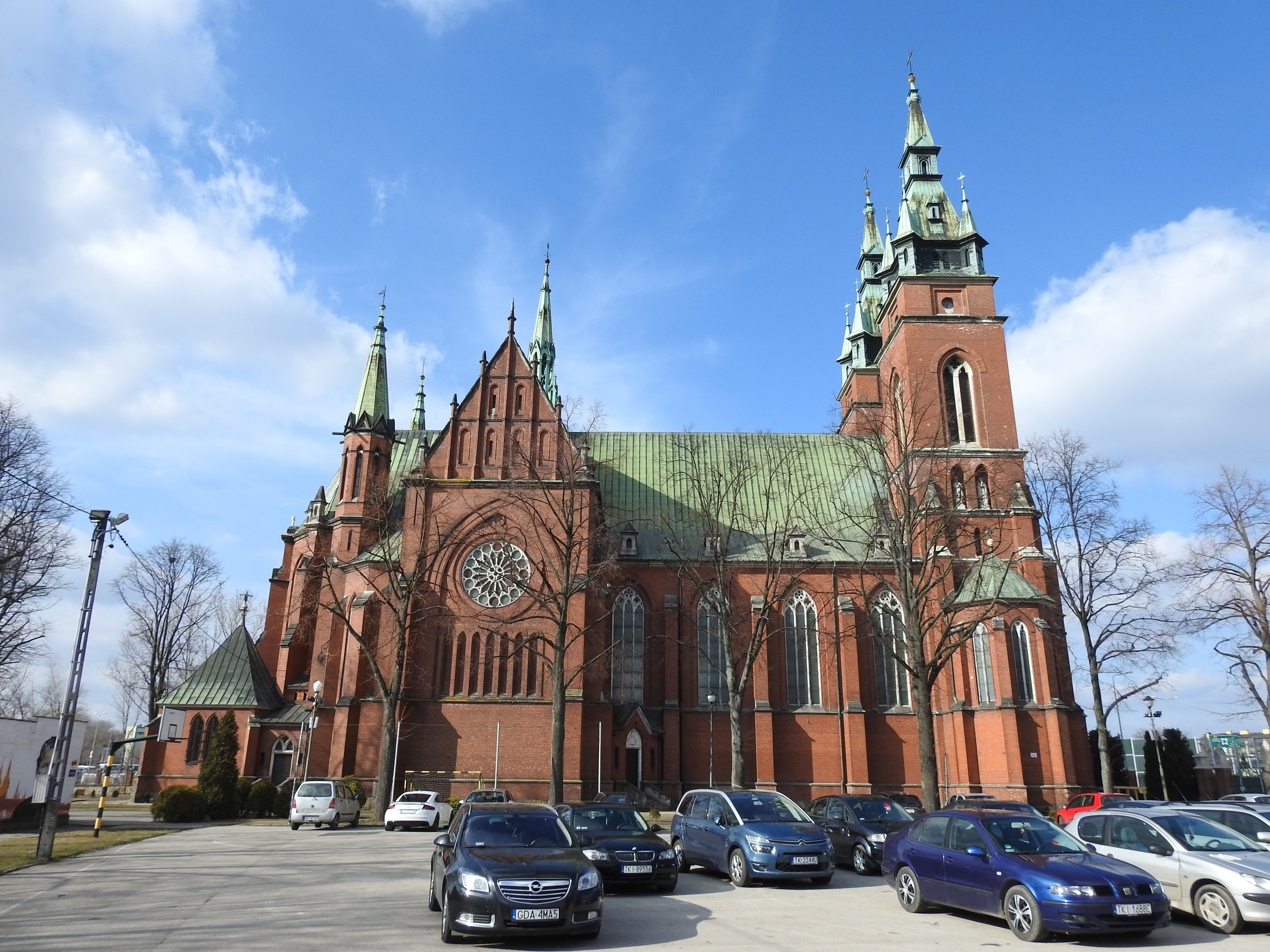
Exaltation of the Holy Cross church

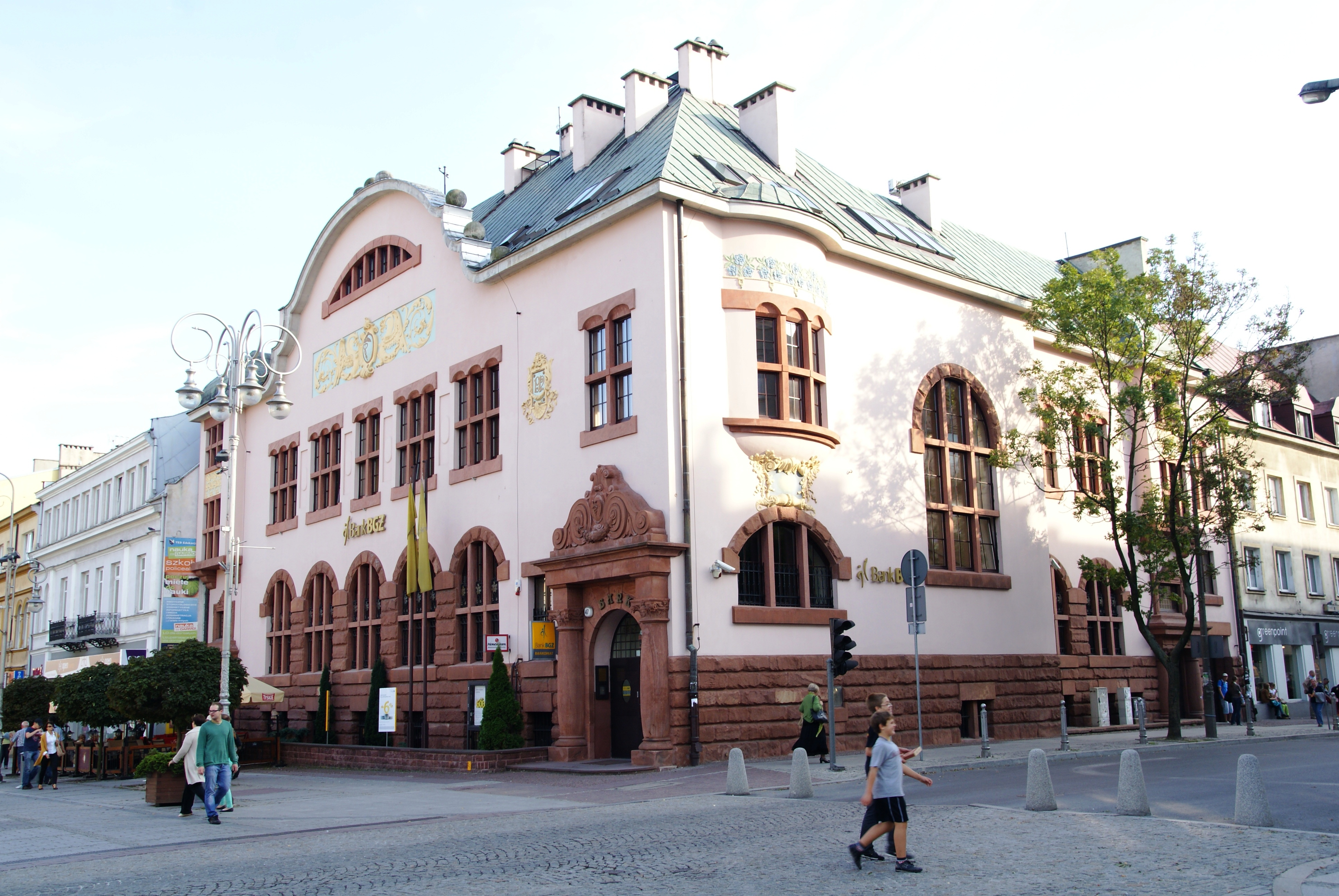
Bank building at 47 Sienkiewicza Street

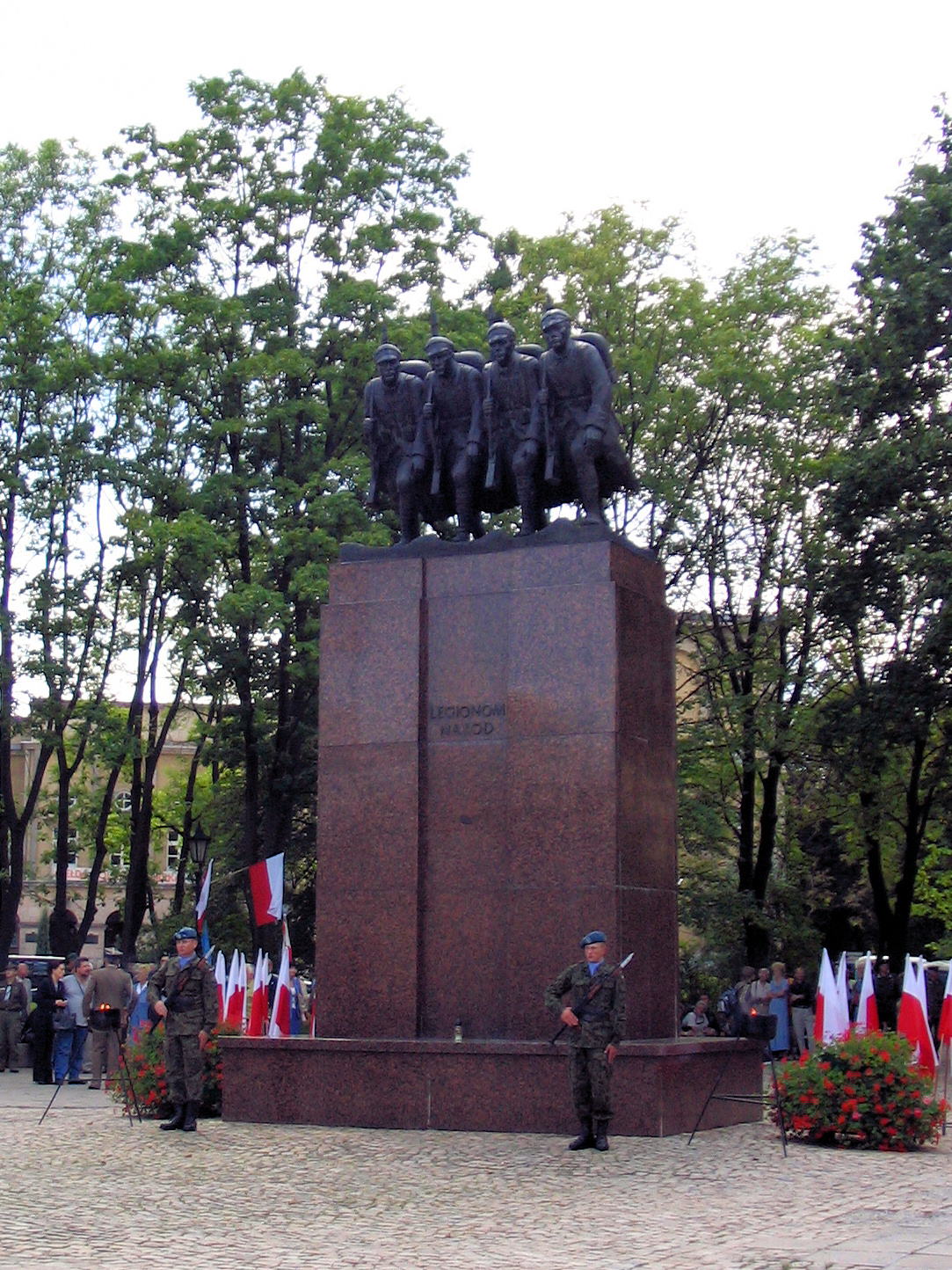
The Monument of The Legion Four

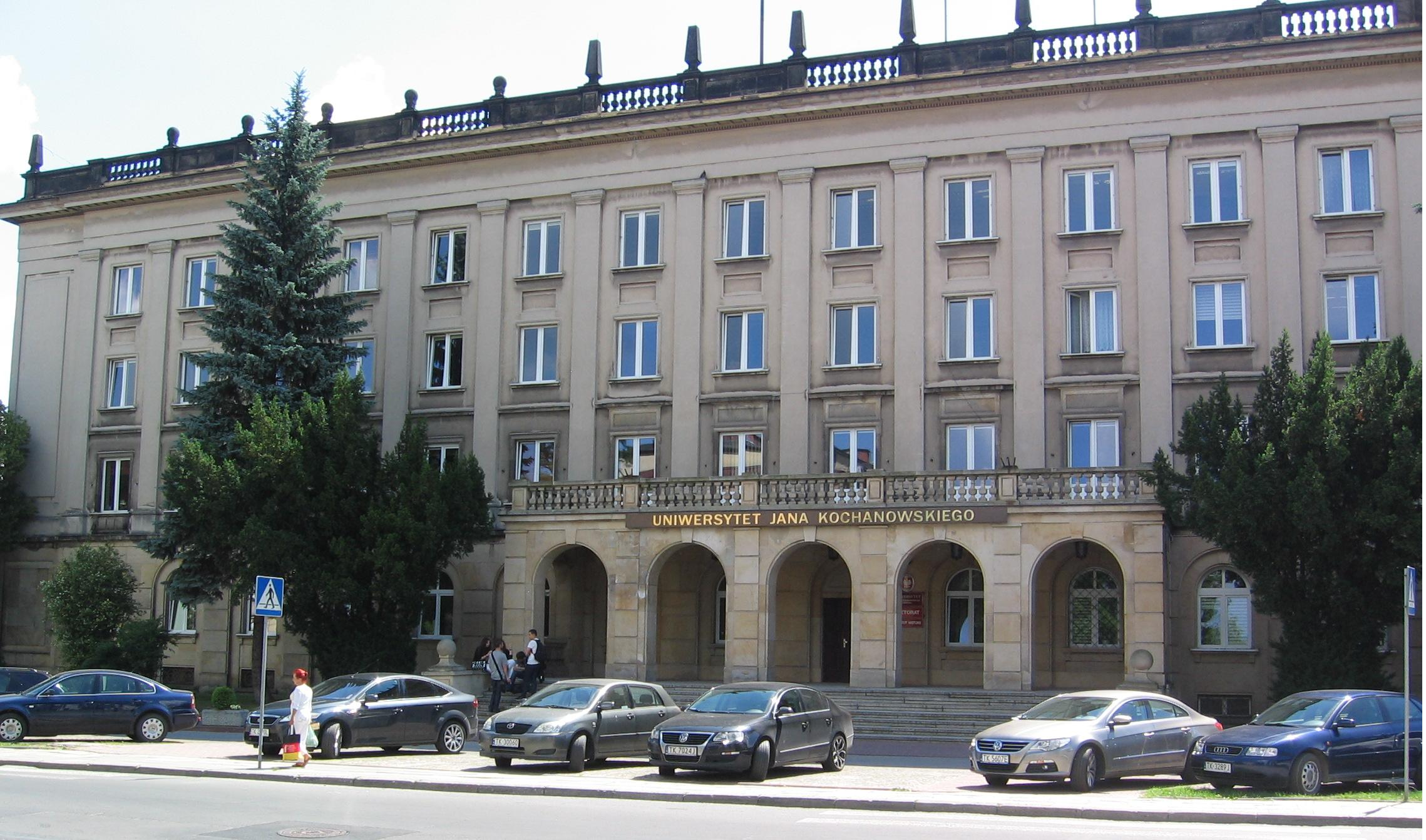
Jan Kochanowski University

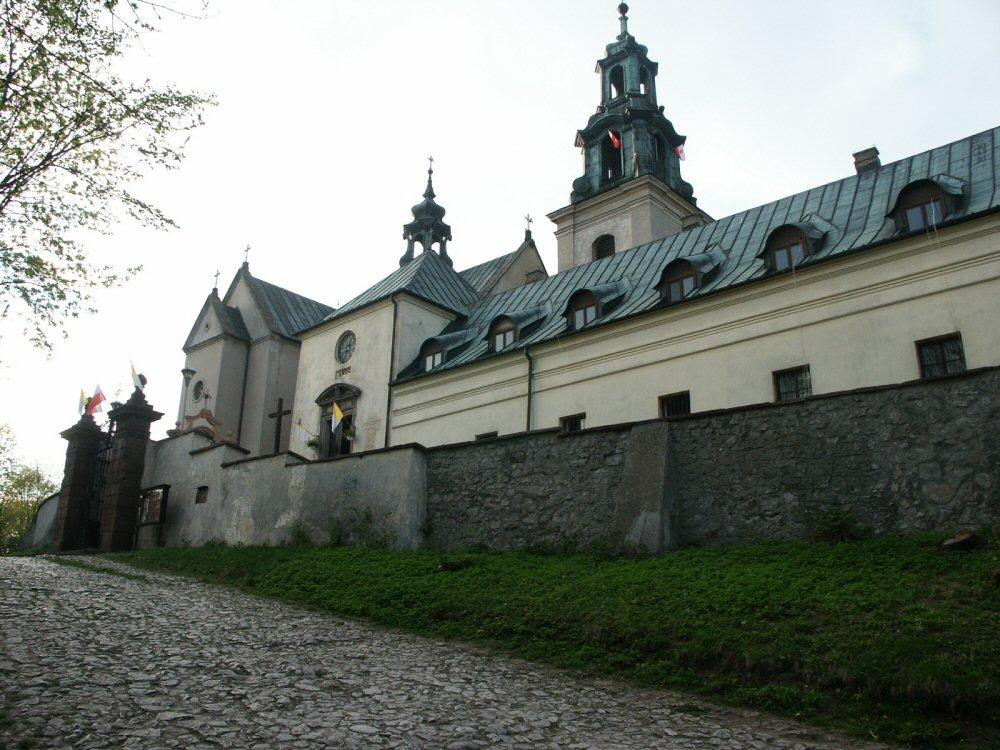
Karczówka Monastery, built 1624–1631

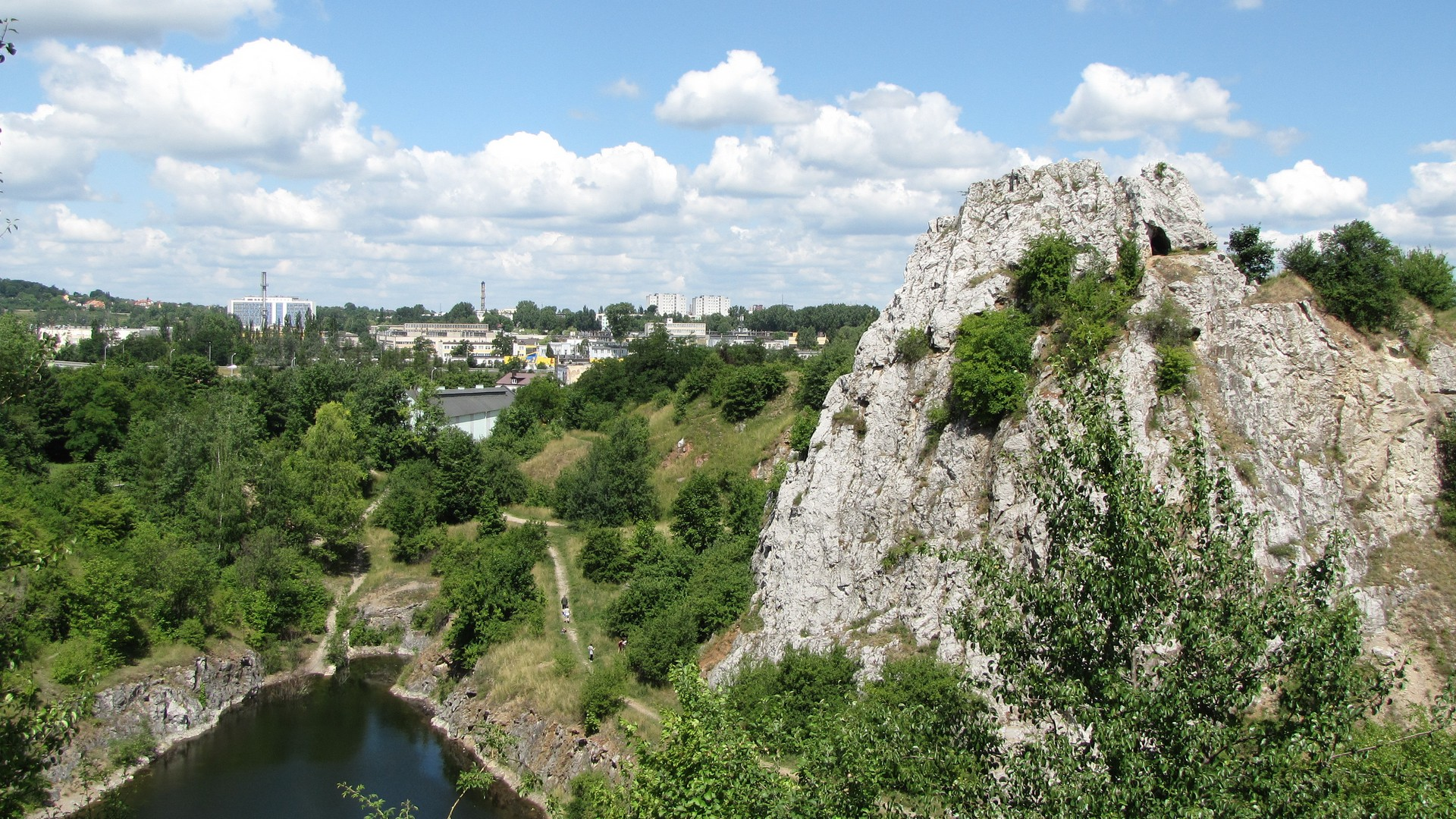
Kadzielnia natural reserve

== Education ==
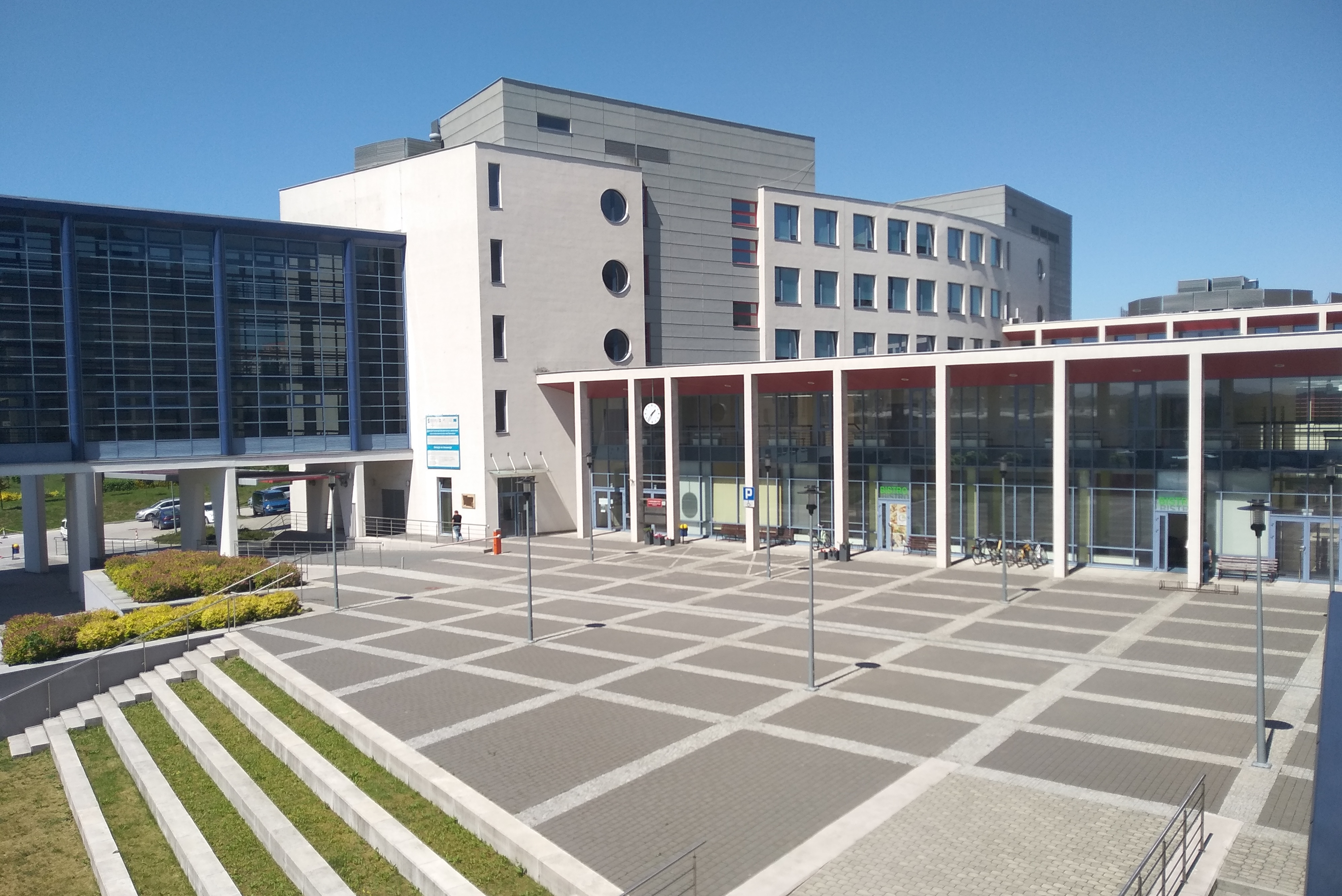
Jan Kochanowski University

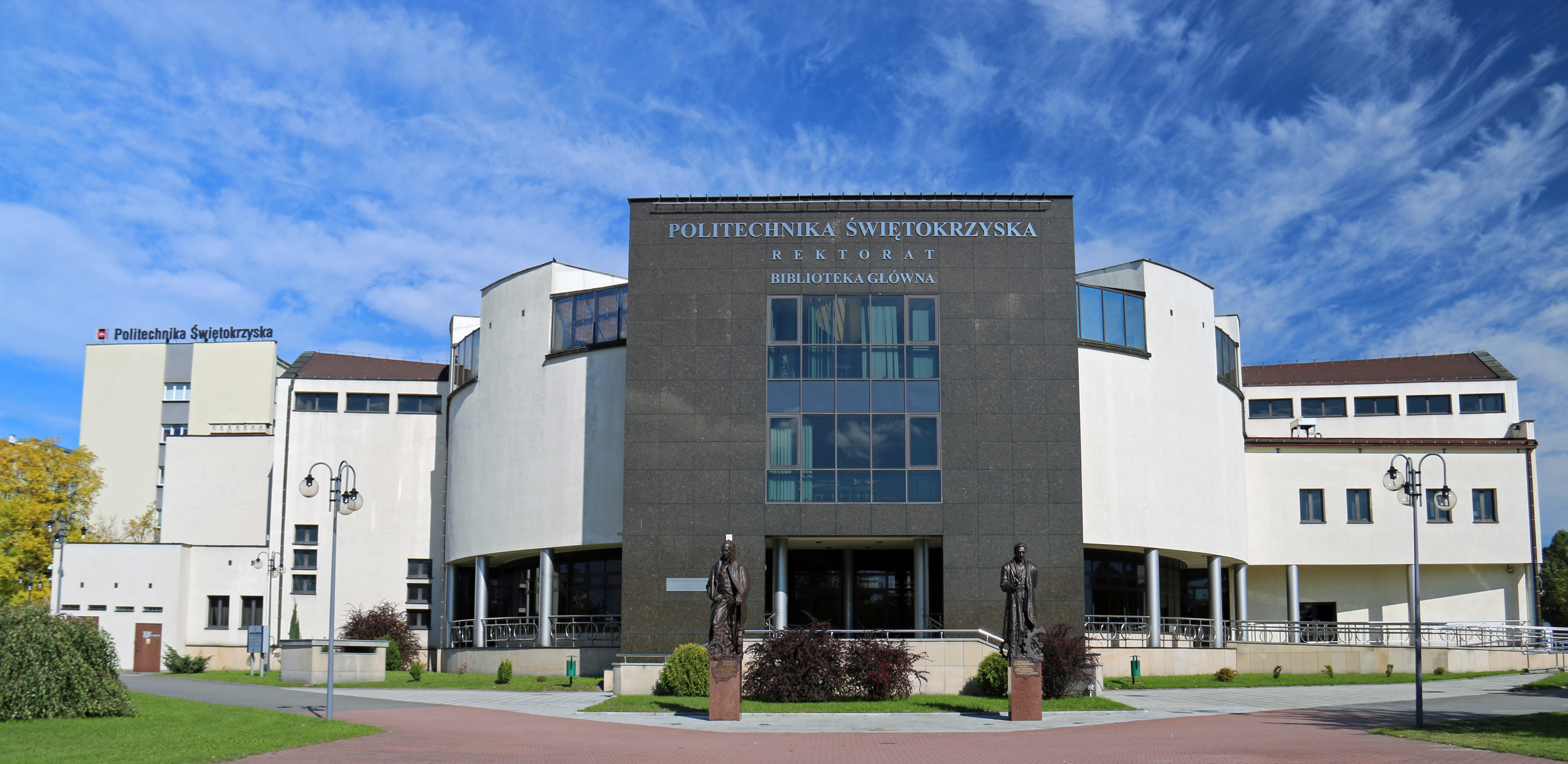
Kielce University of Technology

- Kielce University of Technology (Politechnika Świętokrzyska)
- Jan Kochanowski University (Uniwersytet Jana Kochanowskiego)
- Świętokrzyska Szkoła Wyższa
- Wszechnica Świętokrzyska
- Wyzsza Szkola Administracji Publicznej
- Wyzsza Szkola Ekonomii i Prawa im. prof. Edwarda Lipinskiego
- Wyzsza Szkola Handlowa im. Boleslawa Markowskiego
- Wyzsza Szkola Umiejetnosci
- Wyzsza Szkola Technik Komputerowych i Telekomunikacji
- Wyzsza Szkola Zarzadzania Gospodarka Regionalna i Turystyka
- Wyzsza Szkola Telekomunikacji i Informatyki
- Towarzystwo Wiedzy Powszechnej OR, Kielce
- High schools, among others:
  - Juliusz Słowacki High School No. 6
  - Stefan Żeromski High School No. 1
  - Jan Śniadecki High School No. 2

== Demographics ==
Historical population
Year	Pop.	±%
1950	61,332	—
1960	89,500	+45.9%
1970	126,950	+41.8%
1980	185,307	+46.0%
1990	214,202	+15.6%
2000	213,469	−0.3%
2010	203,804	−4.5%
2020	193,415	−5.1%

As of 31 December 2020 there were 193,415 people living in Kielce.

At the end of June 2021, the unemployment rate was 5.0%.

As of the end of June 2021, the average per capita income was PLN 4798.67 gross.

- A graph of Kielce's population over the past 4 centuries:

== Culture ==
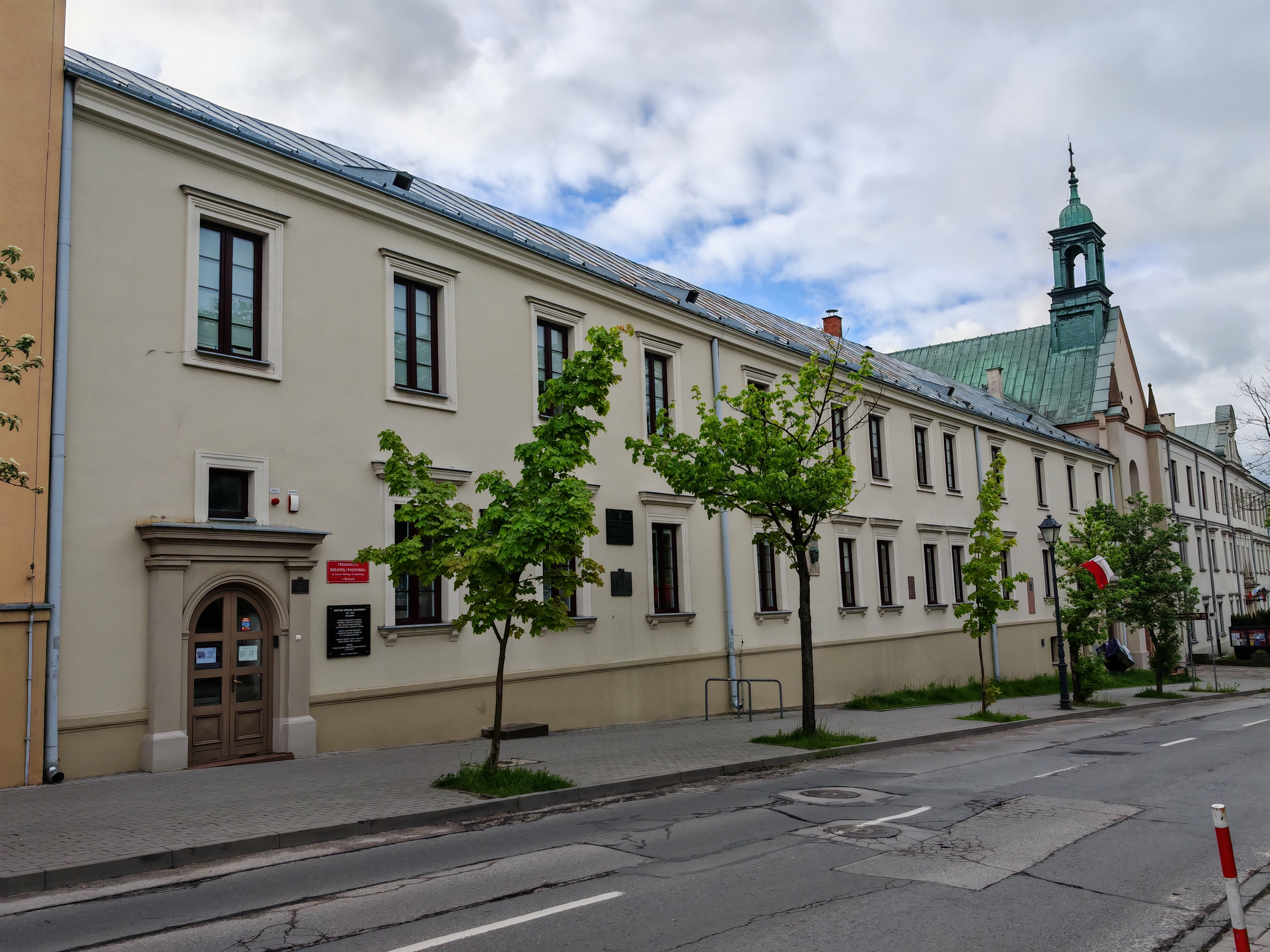
Stefan Żeromski Museum

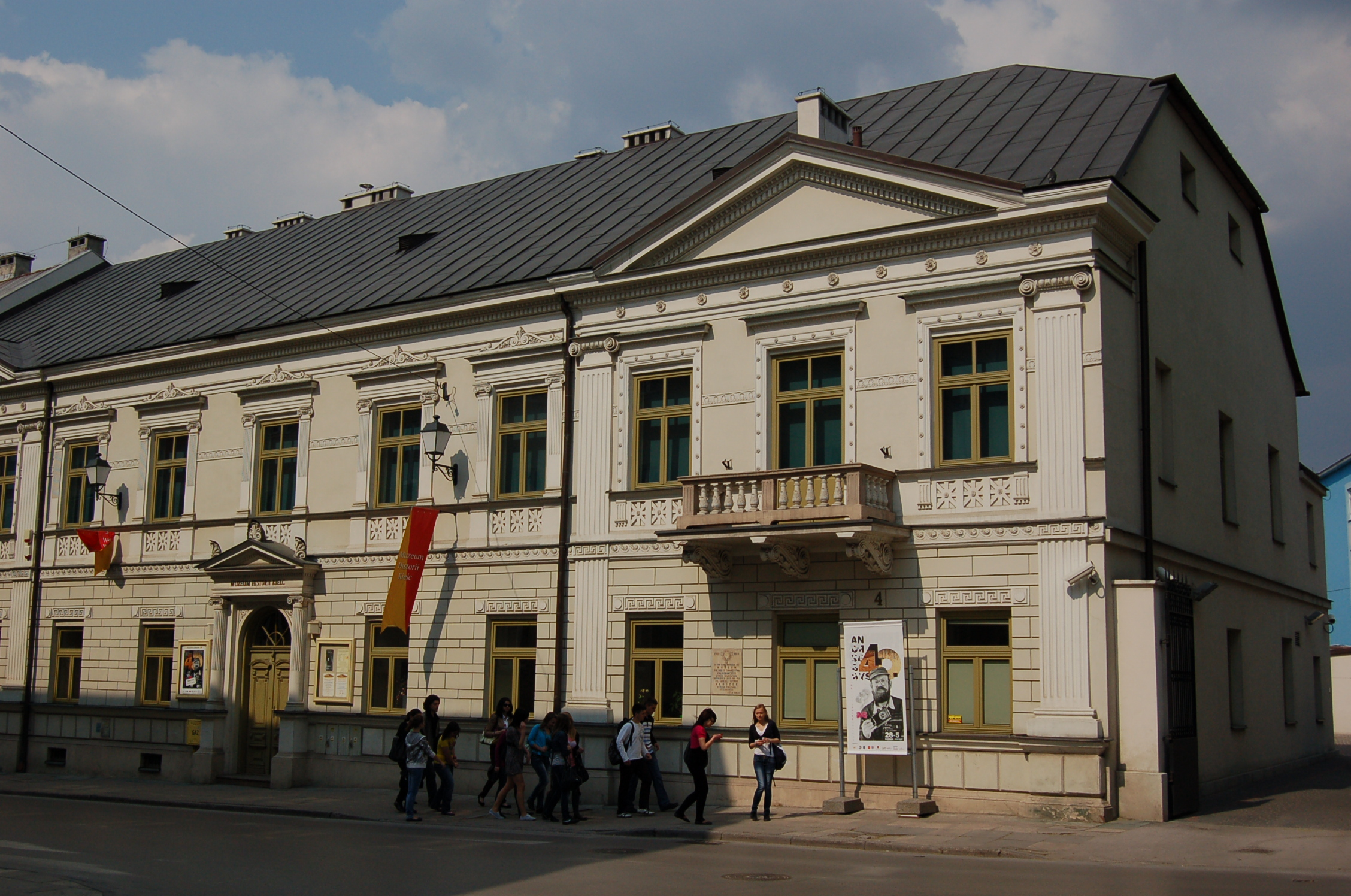
Kielce History Museum

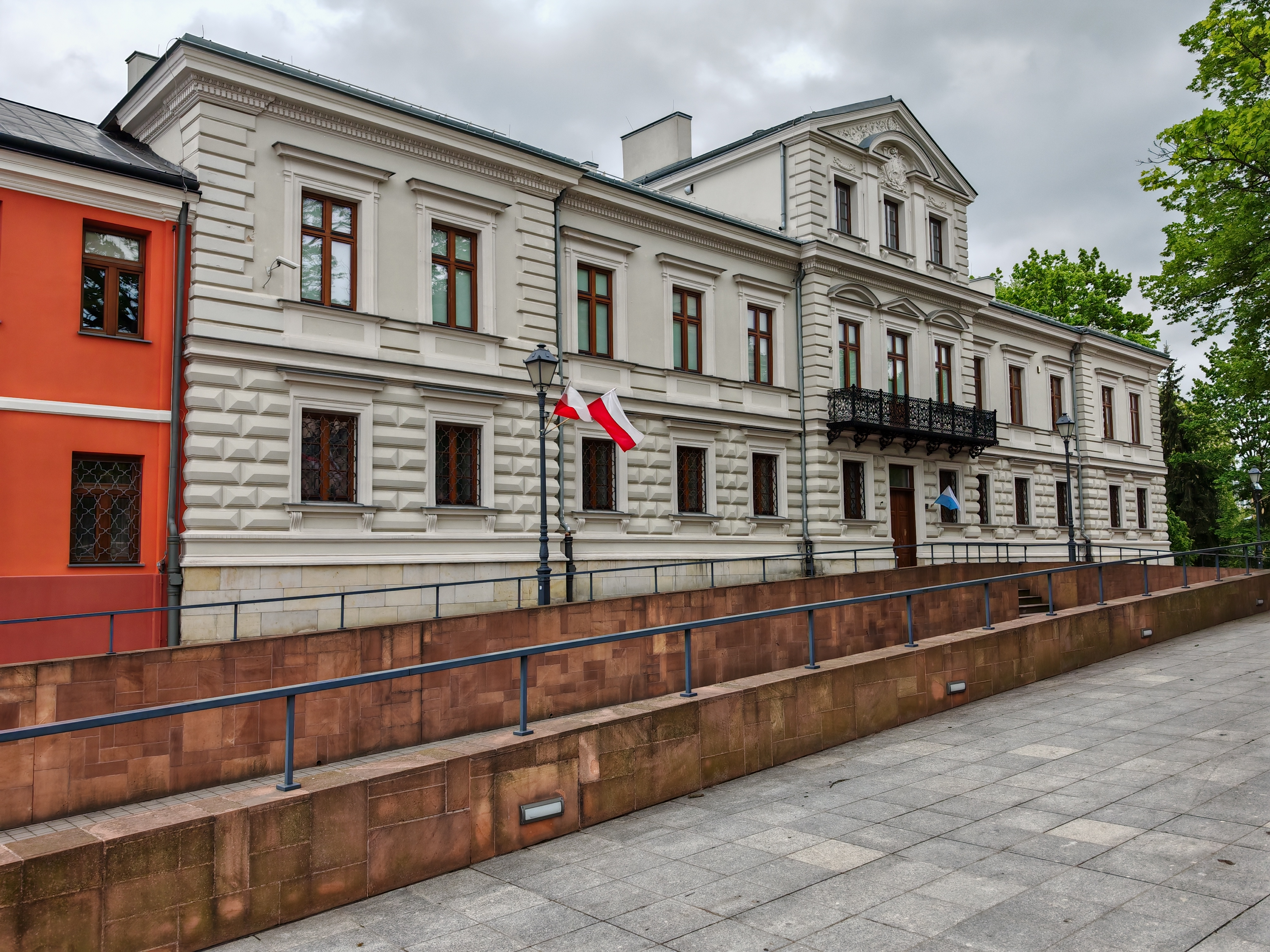
Diocesan Museum

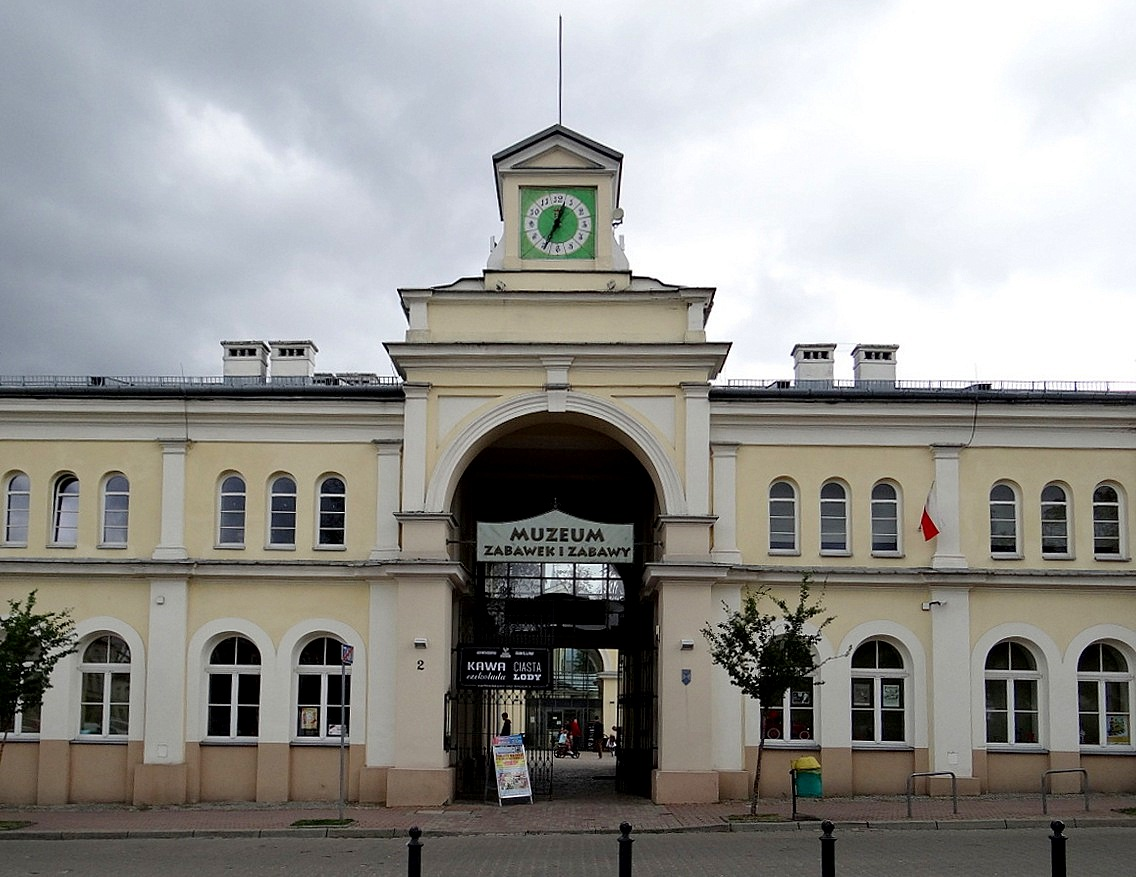
Museum of Toys and Play

=== The arts ===
==== Museums ====
- National Museum in Kielce – a collection of fine arts
- Kielce History Museum
- Museum of Toys and Play
- Laurens Hammond Museum
- Stefan Żeromski museum
- Diocesan Museum

==== Theatres ====
- Stefan Żeromski Theatre
- Kieleckie Centrum Kultury - KCK
- Teatr Lalki i Aktora "Kubuś" - Puppet and Actor Theatre "Kubuś"
- Kielecki Teatr Tańca - Kielce Dance Theatre

=== Sports ===
Professional sports teams
Club	Sport	League	Trophies
Industria Kielce	Men's handball	Superliga	21 Polish Championships; 18 Polish Cups; 1 EHF Champions League (2016)
Korona Kielce	Men's football	Ekstraklasa	0
Korona Handball Kielce	Women's handball	Liga Centralna Kobiet	0

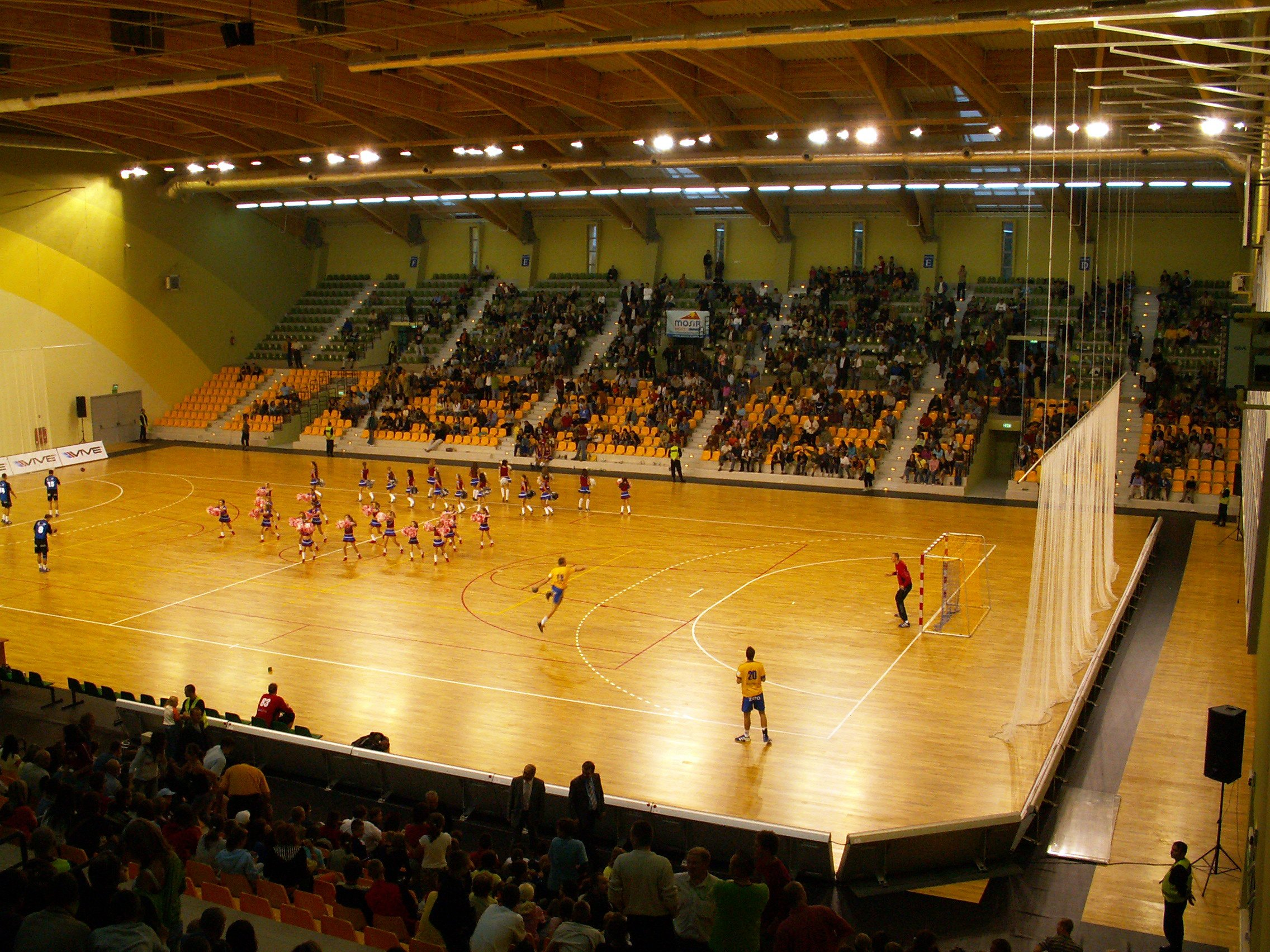
Sports hall

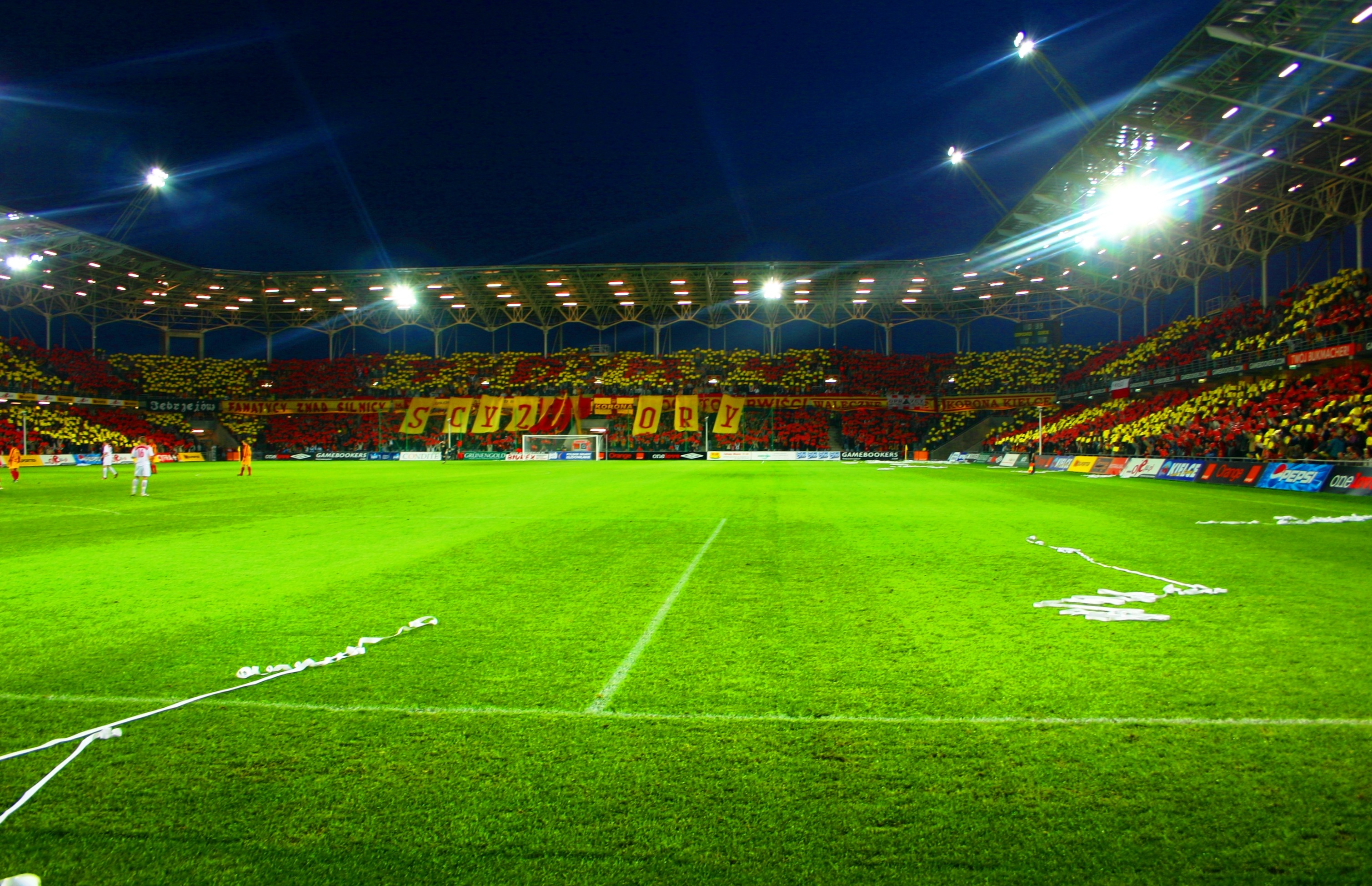
Football stadium

Other clubs:

- KKL Kielce (athletics) - Official website of KKL Kielce
- Oficina da Capoeira Kielce - Capoeira Club in Kielce
- Muay Thai Kielce
- Żak Kielce (judo club)
- Kielecki Klub Karate Kyokushin
- Rushh Kielce (boxing club)
- Gwardia Kielce (boxing club)
- Orlęta Kielce (football club, IV league)
- Jokers Kielce (American football)
- Tęcza Kielce
- Tor Kielce circuit in Miedziana Góra
- Mountain biking in Kielce
- Contact Kielce billiards club from Kielce, Champion of Poland and medalist of Polish League

== Economy ==
Since the establishment of Targi Kielce in 1992, trade fairs and congress activity has become an important part of Kielce's economy, with the company hosting numerous international exhibitions and events.

== Transport ==
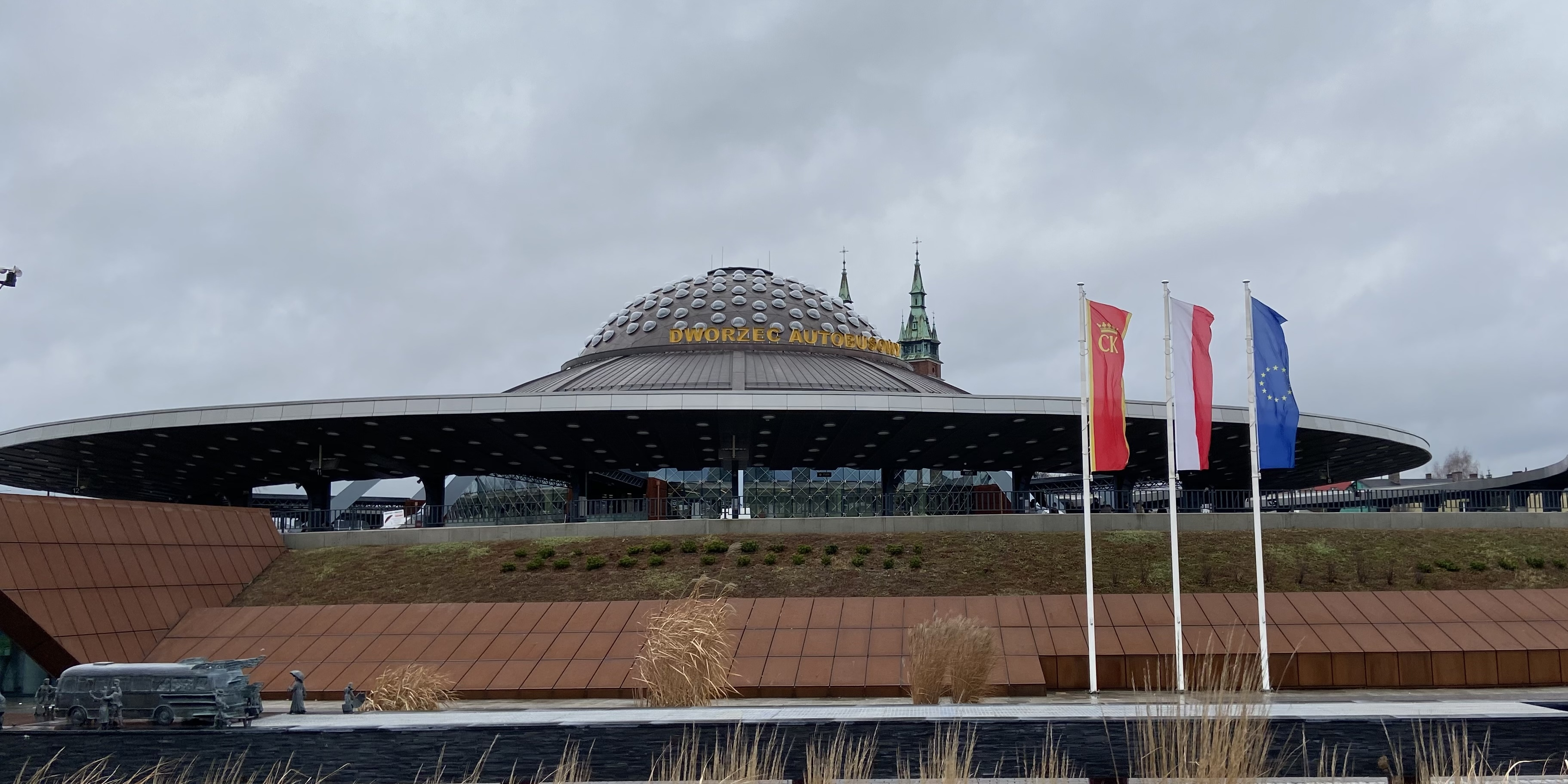
Kielce bus station

Kielce is an important transport hub, and is on international and domestic routes:

- DK 7 S 7 Gdańsk – Elbląg – Warsaw – Radom – Kielce – Kraków – Chyżne
- DK 73 Wiśniówka – Kielce – Tarnów – Pilzno – Jasło
- DK 74 S 74 Sulejów – Kielce – Opatów – Szczebrzeszyn – Zamość – and from there to Ukraine

Provincial roads:

- DW 745 Dąbrowa – Masłów – Radlin
- DW 761 Kielce – Piekoszów
- DW 762 Kielce – Chęciny – Małogoszcz
- DW 764 Kielce – Suków – Raków – Staszów – Połaniec
- DW 786 Kielce – Ruda Strawczyńska – Łopuszno – Włoszczowa – Koniecpol – Święta Anna – Częstochowa

In addition, Kielce has a network of district roads, covering 109 streets with a total length of 114.9 km (71.4 mi) and a network of roads covering 446 streets with a total length of 220.9 km (137.3 mi). 57.5% of roads in the city has an improved hard surface, 8.4% of hard surface is not improved, while 34.1% are dirt.

=== Railways ===
Rail transport came to Kielce in 1885, when the construction of the line linking Iwanogród (Dęblin) and Dąbrowa Górnicza was completed. Currently, Kielce is an important intersection of railway lines, running to Częstochowa and Lubliniec, Warsaw, Kraków and Sandomierz. Within the administrative boundaries of the city there are the following railway stations: Kielce, Kielce Piaski, Kielce Białogon, Kielce Herbskie, Kielce Ślichowice.

=== Air travel ===
At present, air services are only available to the residents of Kielce at Kielce-Masłów Airport, a civilian airport located in nearby Masłów. It is not able to accommodate large passenger planes, because its runway is only 1,200 m. Its reconstruction is seen as not viable and in June 2006 the decision was made about the location of a new airport near the village of the Obice Morawica, able to handle regular airlines. At present, land has been purchased for the investment. The nearest international airports are located in Kraków-Balice, Warsaw-Okecie and Rzeszów-Jasionka.

=== Local transport ===
Official transport services were first established on 22 July 1951, when the local transport department was created.

After many changes today, the city operates 46 regular bus lines (1-53 without 3, 6, 15–17, 20, 22, 37, 39–40, 42, 46, 48–49, 52), 7 "EU" lines (102-114 without 105–106, 109–111, 113), 5 hybrid bus lines (34, 46, 50, 51, 54), two free circle lines (0W and 0Z) two lines of special constants (F, Z) and two night lines (N1, N2). Most of the regular lines are operated by the Municipal Transport Company (MPK Kielce) and Kielce Bus Company Workers (KASP), and the "EU", the free circle lines and some normal lines (13, 23, 24) are operated by BP Tour Regio under an agreement signed with the Management of Urban Transport (ZTM Kielce). In Kielce, there are two depots, one used by MPK and the other used by BP Tour Regio. The rolling stock is composed of about 165 buses.

In 2009/10 the Transport Authority in Kielce released the Polish Operational Programme Development of Eastern 2007 - 2013 project "Development of public transport system in Kielce Metropolitan Area." They bought 40 new buses -Solaris Urbino 12s, and another 20 were bought in 2010. These buses will support new lines. Part of the project, envisages installation of 24 electronic boards for bus departure times and 20 stationary ticket vending machines.

=== Long-distance travel ===
The history of communication dates back to coaches from Kielce in 1945, when the District was set up. Already in 1946, there were regular routes to Kraków, Warsaw, Jelenia Góra, Teplice and neighbouring towns.

After 1990, the Kielce Bus Station was renamed the PKS Station in Kielce, and has maintained regular passenger long-distance routes.

== Kielce constituency ==
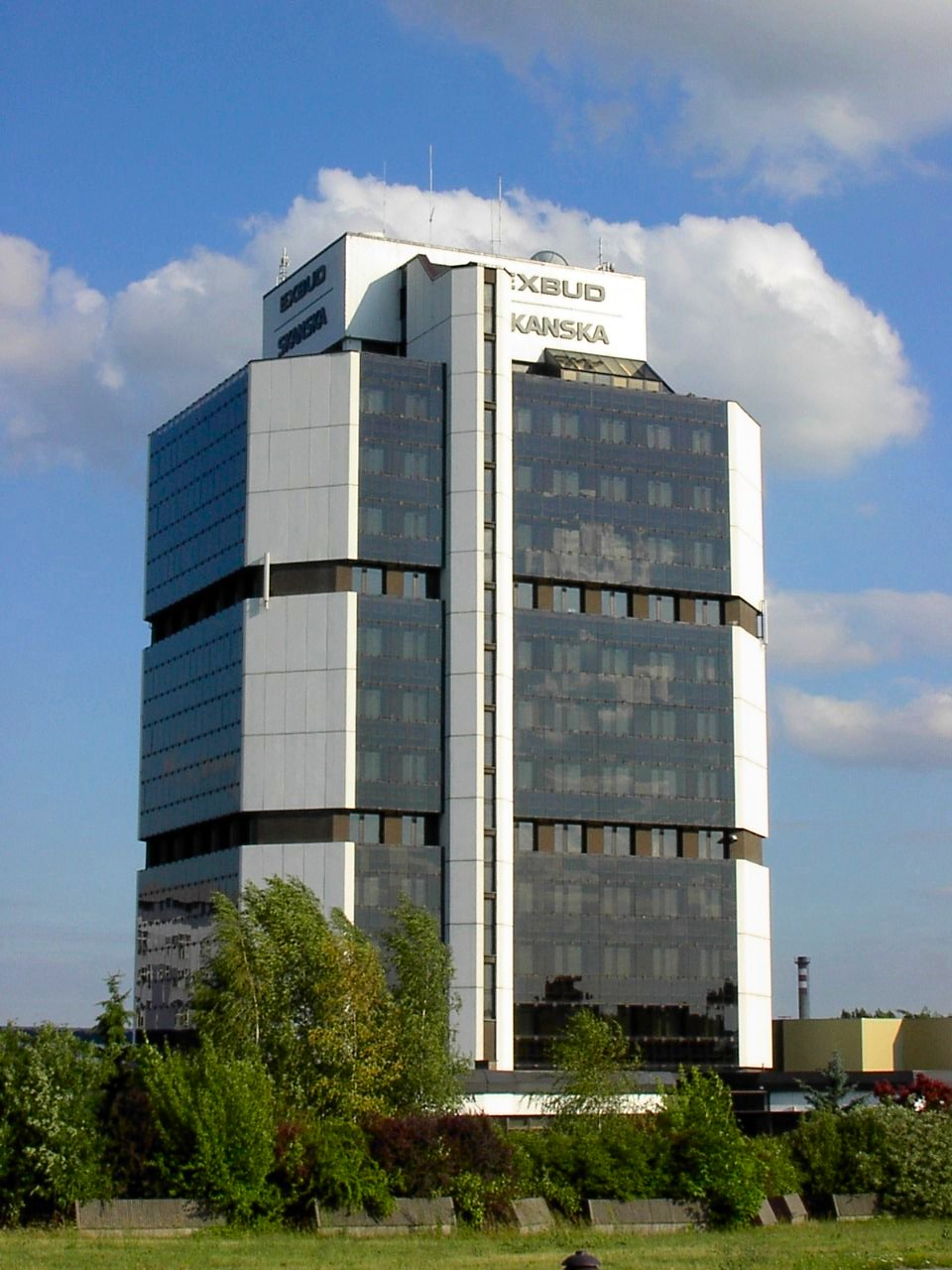
Kielce Business Center - the headquarters of Exbud-Skanska, a symbol of modern Kielce

The current Members of Parliament (Sejm) elected from Kielce constituency in 2019 Polish parliamentary election are:

- Krzysztof Bosak (Confederation Liberty and Independence)
- Michał Cieślak (Law and Justice)
- Adam Cyrański (Civic Coalition)
- Bartłomiej Dorywalski (Law and Justice)
- Anna Krupka (Law and Justice)
- Andrzej Kryj (Law and Justice)
- Marek Kwitek (Law and Justice)
- Krzysztof Lipiec (Law and Justice)
- Marzena Okła-Drewnowicz (Civic Coalition)
- Adam Siekierski (Polish People's Party)
- Bartłomiej Sienkiewicz (Civic Coalition)
- Andrzej Szejna (Democratic Left Alliance)
- Dominik Tarczyński (Law and Justice)
- Sylwester Wawrzyk (Law and Justice)
- Katarzyna Wojtyszek (Law and Justice)
- Zbigniew Ziobro (Law and Justice)

The current senator elected from Kielce constituency is Krzysztof Słoń (Law and Justice).

== Notable people ==
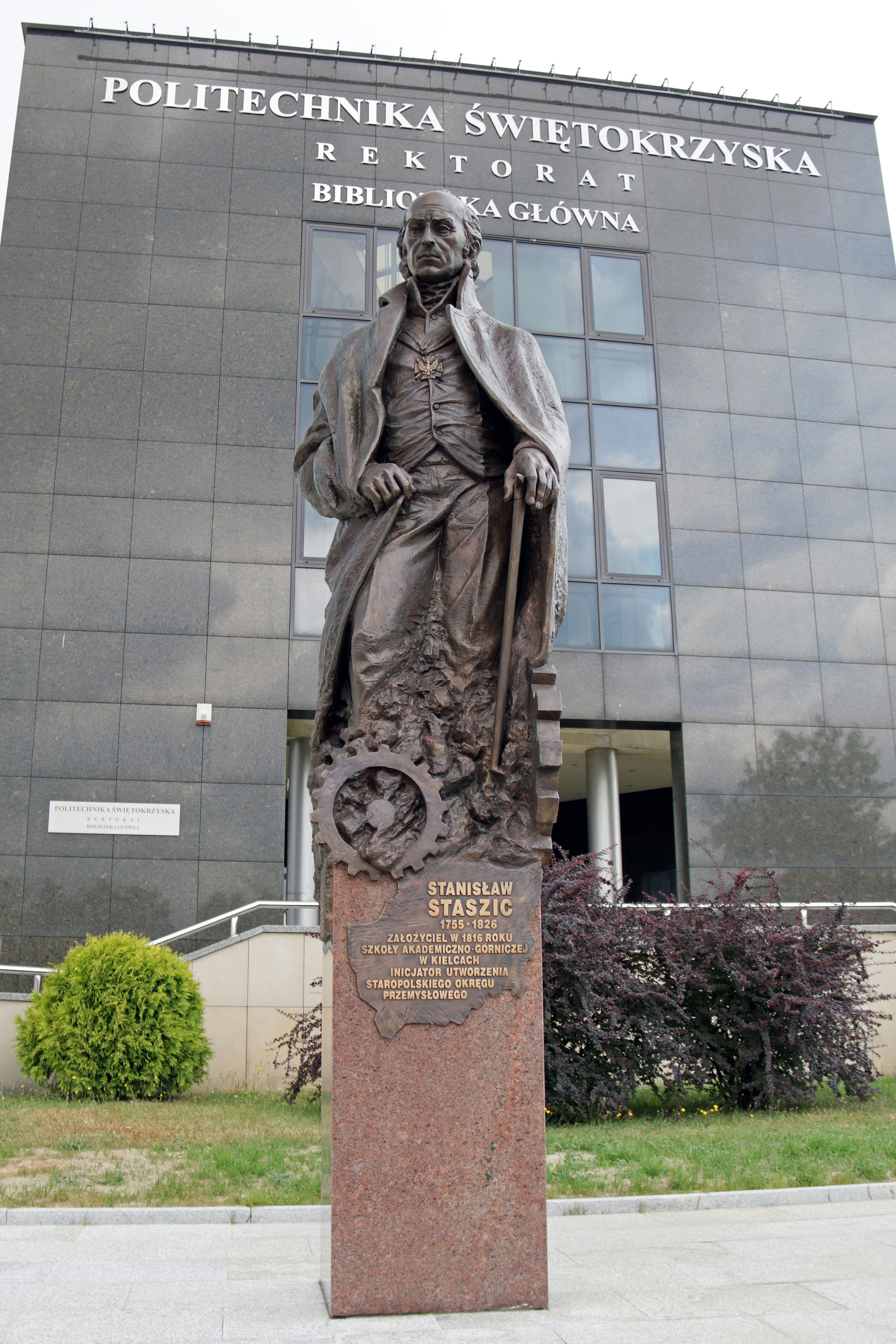
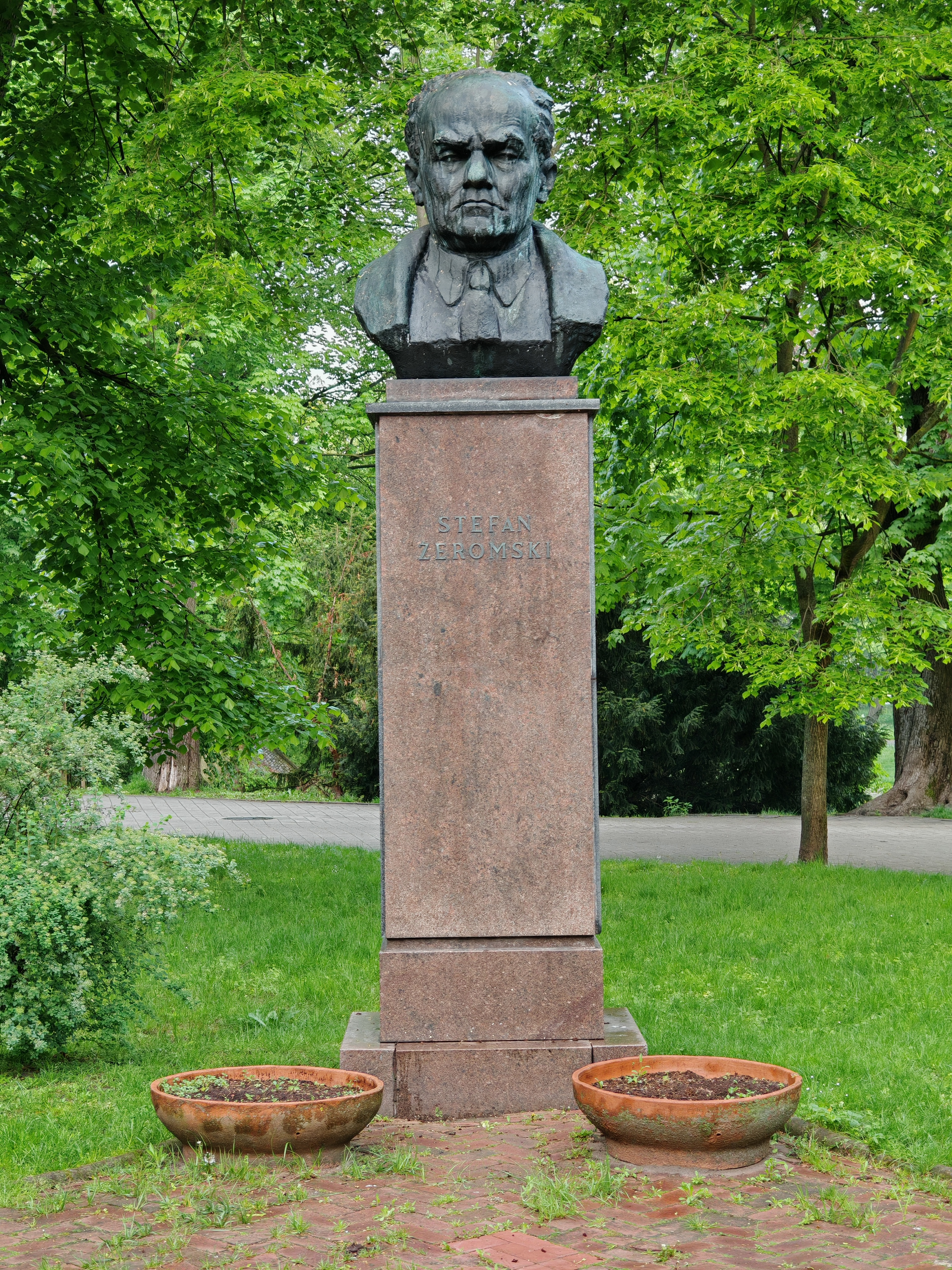
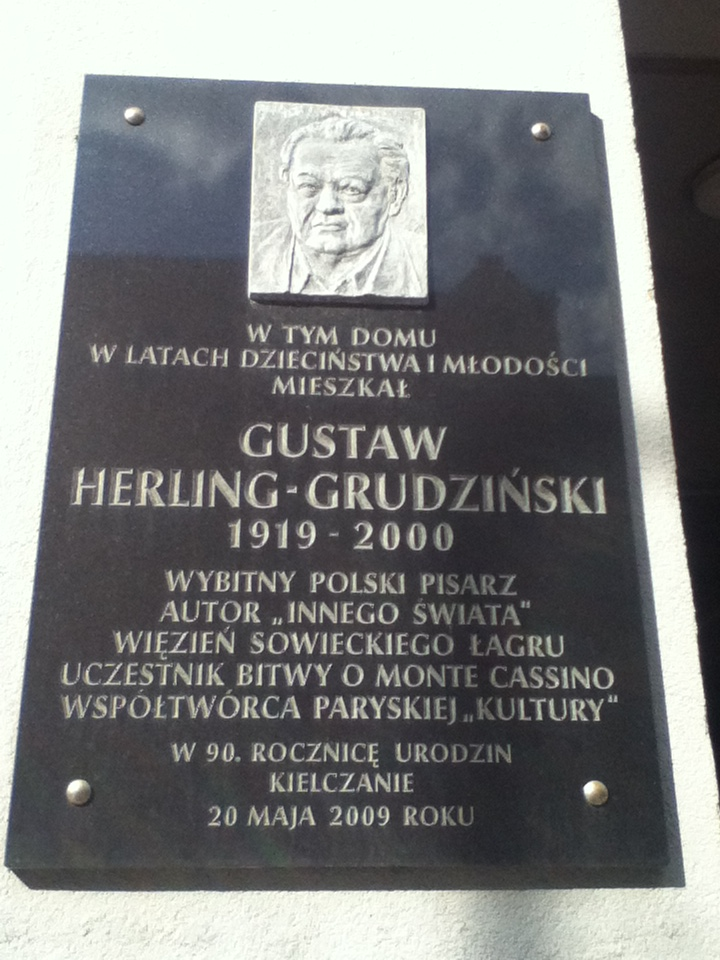
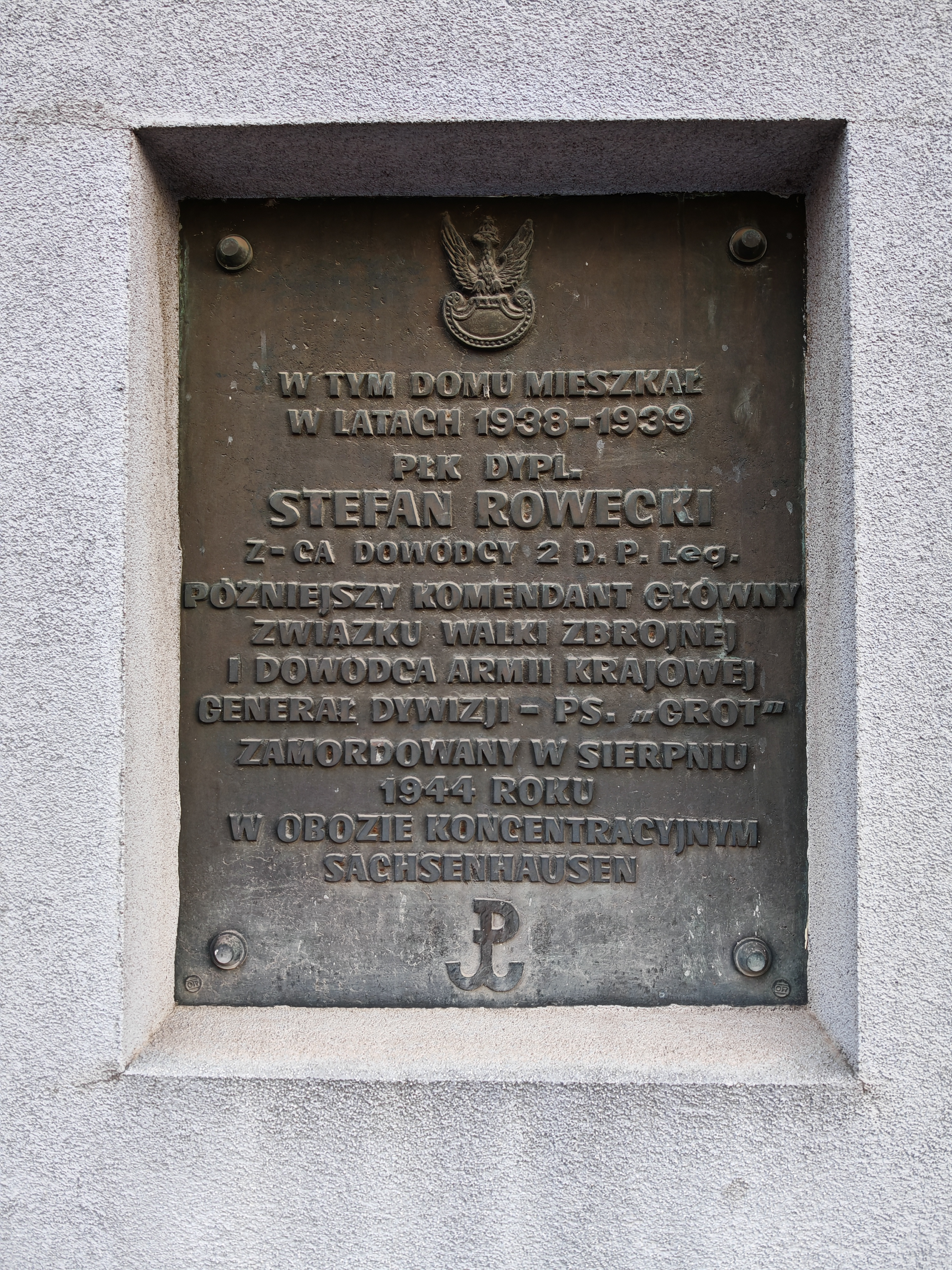
Monuments and memorials to prominent figures associated with Kielce: Stanisław Staszic, Stefan Żeromski, Gustaw Herling-Grudziński, Stefan Rowecki
- Stanisław Staszic (1755–1826), priest, philosopher, statesman, poet and writer, a leader of the Polish Enlightenment, one of principal authors of Constitution of 3 May 1791 – Europe's oldest written constitution
- Adolf Dygasiński (1839–1902), novelist
- Mieczysław Jaroński (1862–1922), violin virtuoso and teacher
- Stefan Żeromski (1864–1925), novelist and dramatist, known as the "conscience of Polish literature"
- Czesław Bieżanko (1895–1986), entomologist
- Gustaw Herling-Grudziński (1919–2000), writer, journalist and essayist; World War II underground fighter, and political dissident abroad during the communist system in Poland
- Gershon Iskowitz (1921–1988), Canadian artist
- Edmund Niziurski (1925–2013), writer
- Wiesław Gołas (1930–2021), actor
- Thomas Buergenthal (1934–2023), American judge, lived in Kielce Ghetto, an author of A Lucky Child
- Rafał Olbiński (born 1943), graphic artist, stage designer and surrealist painter
- Włodzimierz Pawlik (born 1958), Grammy Award-winning jazz pianist and composer
- Krzysztof Klicki (born 1962), president of Kolporter Holding, former owner of Korona Kielce
- Michał Sołowow (born 1962), businessman, billionaire and rally driver, shareholder of Cersanit S.A., Echo Investment, Barlinek, Życie Warszawy, one of the richest Poles
- Piotr Marzec better known as Liroy (born 1971), rapper
- Andrzej Piaseczny (born 1971), vocalist
- Mateusz Polit (born 1975), choreographer
- Dagmara Domińczyk (born 1976), Polish-American actress and author (Succession, The Lost Daughter, Priscilla)
- Marika Domińczyk (born 1980), Polish-American actress (The 40-Year-Old Virgin, Grey's Anatomy)
- Rafał Zawierucha (born 1986), actor, grew up in Kielce
- Marcin Patrzałek (born 2000), musician, guitarist, arranger and composer

=== Sportsmen ===
- Leszek Drogosz (1933–2012), boxer, three-time European Champion, Olympic medalist
- Zbigniew Piątek (born 1966), cyclist
- Piotr Stokowiec (born 1972), football manager
- Paweł Brożek (born 1983), footballer (Polonia Białogon, GKS Katowice, Wisła Kraków, Trabzonspor, Celtic F.C.)
- Piotr Brożek (born 1983), footballer (Górnik Zabrze, Wisła Kraków, Trabzonspor)

== International relations ==
=== Consulates ===
There are honorary consulates of Finland, Germany and Hungary in Kielce.

=== Twin towns – sister cities ===
Kielce is twinned with:

- Csepel (Budapest), Hungary
- Gotha, Germany
- Orange, France
- Ramla, Israel
- Vinnytsia, Ukraine
- Kamianske, Ukraine

=== Friendly relations ===
In addition to the twin towns, Kielce also has friendly relations with:

- Bacău, Romania
- Flensburg, Germany
- Sandviken, Sweden
- Taizhou, China
- Třebíč, Czech Republic
- Yuyao, China
