= Organization of Special Combat Actions =

Unit of the Home Army tasked with special operations

The Organization of Special Combat Actions (Osa–Kosa 30) (Note: The full name of the unit is given according to Strzembosz (1983, p. 57). In some sources, the name Special Actions Organization is also encountered (Chmielarz (2014, p. 563); Wilamowski & Kopczuk (1990, p. 168)) or Special Combat Actions Unit (Czarnecka (2014, p. 94)).) was a unit of the Polish Home Army tasked with special operations, active from May 1942 to July 1943.

Osa was a deeply clandestine unit under the direct command of the Home Army's Chief Commander, carrying out combat missions on his orders. Initially, its operations were confined to the General Government area. In December 1942, its operational range was extended to the territory of the Third Reich. The unit's tasks included the elimination of high-ranking Nazi officials and conducting major sabotage activities. In February 1943, Osa was incorporated into the structures of Kedyw, and its name was changed to Kosa 30. However, it retained its structure, almost unchanged personnel, and a high degree of autonomy.

The soldiers of Osa–Kosa 30 carried out several combat operations, including an unsuccessful attempt to assassinate the Higher SS and Police Leader in the General Government, Friedrich-Wilhelm Krüger, and bombing attacks in Berlin and Wrocław. The unit was dismantled after the Gestapo arrested several dozen of its soldiers on 5 June 1943, who were attending a comrade's wedding at St. Alexander's Church in Warsaw.

== Character and tasks of the unit ==
The Organization of Special Combat Actions (Osa) was established in May 1942. It was directly subordinated to the Commander-in-Chief of the Home Army and carried out combat missions on his orders. The nature of the tasks assigned to the unit necessitated special measures of secrecy. Tomasz Strzembosz emphasized that Osa was not a typical detached unit, but rather an autonomous organization, separated from other Home Army structures (Note: Officially, Osa was part of Branch V of the Home Army Headquarters. However, this was a purely formal subordination (Strzembosz (1983, p. 208)).) and operating independently of the Union of Retaliation and other units responsible for ongoing combat.

The unit's operational range covered the entire General Government, and from December 1942, also included pre-war German territory and Polish lands annexed by the Reich. Osa was entrusted with tasks of special significance, such as the elimination of high-ranking Nazi dignitaries and particularly cruel representatives of the occupation apparatus, as well as conducting major sabotage.

On 22 January 1943, the Home Army Commander-in-Chief, General Stefan Rowecki, codenamed Grot, issued Order No. 84, which mandated the reorganization of active combat operations. One of the effects of this order was the incorporation of Osa into the structures of Kedyw. This formally took place on 1 March 1943, although Tomasz Strzembosz suspected that the actual transfer occurred as early as February of that year. From then on, Osa became one of the three main discretionary units of Kedyw (alongside the units Motor 30 and Liga 30). Shortly afterward, it also changed its name to Kosa 30. However, the unit retained its previous structure, almost unchanged personnel composition, and the same high degree of autonomy. The role of the commander of Kedyw's discretionary units, formally the superior of Kosa 30, in practice, was reduced to that of a coordinator.

In Polish historiography, the Organization of Special Combat Actions is usually referred to by the double name Osa–Kosa 30. This unit should be distinguished from the so-called Kosa Group, one of the three discretionary units of Kedyw of the Home Army's Warsaw District, commanded by Lieutenant Ludwik Witkowski, codenamed Kosa (from May 1944 – discretionary unit B).

== Personnel and organizational structure ==
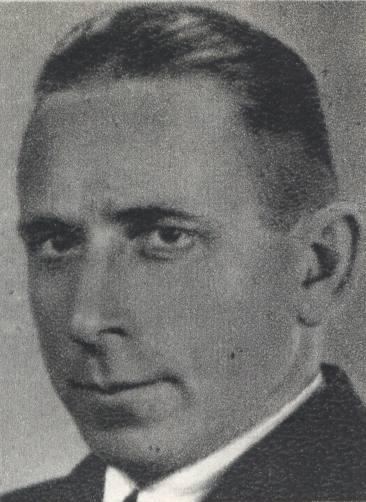
Mieczysław Kudelski, codenamed Wiktor – Chief of Staff of Osa–Kosa 30

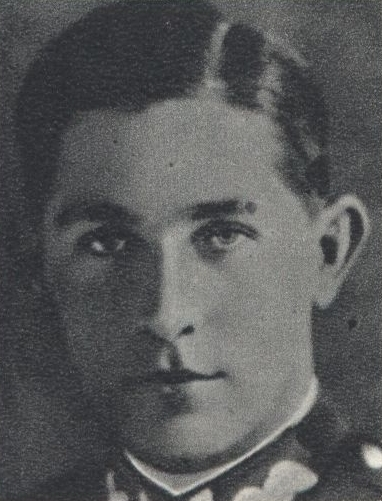
Jerzy Kleczkowski, codenamed Jurek – commander of the Warsaw team

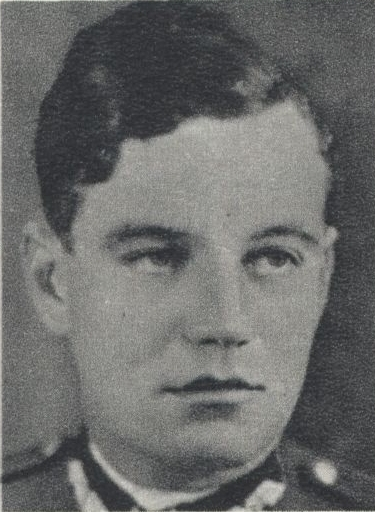
Edward Madej, codenamed Felek – commander of the Kraków team

The creator and commander of Osa–Kosa 30 was Lieutenant Colonel Józef Szajewski, codenamed Philips. The first deputy commander (operational chief) was Lieutenant Zdzisław Pacak-Kuźmirski, codenamed Andrzej, later replaced (Note: November 1942 or February 1943 is usually indicated as the date until which Lieutenant Andrzej served as deputy commander of the unit (Strzembosz (1983, pp. 57–58, 209)).) by Lieutenant Jan Papieski, codenamed Jerzy. The position of the second deputy commander, who also served as the chief of staff of the unit, was held by Lieutenant Mieczysław Kudelski, codenamed Wiktor. In the first months of 1943, three more officers joined the core staff of Osa–Kosa 30: Second Lieutenant Aleksander Kunicki, codenamed Rayski (head of the intelligence cell), Reserve Lieutenant Ewaryst Jakubowski, codenamed Brat (technical officer, Silent Unseen), and Reserve Lieutenant Roman (reference officer of the Study Bureau). The staff liaison officers were Irena Klimesz, codenamed Bogna, and Aleksandra Sokal, codenamed Władka.

Until about the end of November 1942, the Organization of Special Combat Actions was divided into two combat centers (teams): Warsaw and Kraków. In December 1942, a third team (codenamed Zagra-Lin) was created, tasked with conducting sabotage in the territory of the Third Reich. (Note: Wilamowski & Kopczuk (1990, p. 169), disputing the findings of Tomasz Strzembosz, argued that this division seems overly formalized. According to them, the Kraków and Warsaw teams evolved gradually, and the practical sabotage actions undertaken by the Home Army in the territory of the Third Reich preceded the formal establishment of Zagra-Lin.) All three teams continued to function in largely unchanged form even after the unit was incorporated into Kedyw.

The Kraków team (codenamed Kosa Kra w Gobelinie) (Note: Kra in this case means that the team operated in the General Government, while Gobelin was the code name for Kraków (Strzembosz (1983, pp. 210–211)).) was commanded by Lieutenant Edward Madej, codenames Felek, Bolek, Bogusław Bolesław. According to Aleksander Kunicki, the Kraków team consisted of six soldiers. After the failed assassination attempt on SS-Obergruppenführer Friedrich-Wilhelm Krüger, most were evacuated to Warsaw, resulting in the team ceasing to exist.

The Warsaw team (codenamed Kosa Kra w Linie) (Note: Kra in this case means that the team operated in the General Government, while Lin was the code name for Warsaw (Strzembosz (1983, pp. 210–211)).) was commanded by Second Lieutenant Jerzy Kleczkowski, codenames Jurek, Ryś, Bogusław Jan. In 1942, the team had about 30 soldiers divided into small patrols led by Second Lieutenant Jurek (also the center commander), Lieutenant Junior Grade Mieczysław Uniejewski, codenames Marynarz, Bogusław Marynarz, Second Lieutenant Kazimierz Nowosławski, codenamed Chomik I, and others. By spring 1943, the Warsaw team had about 20 soldiers, mostly cadets, divided into three patrols led by the mentioned Second Lieutenant Jurek, Lieutenant Marynarz, and Second Lieutenant Władysław Welwet, codenames Miś, Bogusław Miś.

The Zagra-Lin team (short for Kosa Zagra w Linie) (Note: Zagra in this case means that it was the foreign (Polish: zagraniczny) team of Osa–Kosa 30, while Lin was the code name for Warsaw (Strzembosz (1983, p. 210)).) was commanded by Lieutenant Bernard Drzyzga, codenames Jarosław, Bogusław Jarosław, Kazimierz 30. He commanded 18 soldiers, typically fluent in German and familiar with conditions in the Third Reich. The Zagra-Lin headquarters was in Warsaw, with cells in Bydgoszcz, Kalisz, and temporarily in Riga.

According to Przemysław Wywiał, sections of Osa–Kosa 30 also operated in Lublin and Lviv.

Kedyw's preserved financial documents allow an approximate estimate of Osa–Kosa 30's size. They indicate that in April 1943, the unit had 44 soldiers, and by June that year, its numbers grew to about 51–55 soldiers. Six were part of the core staff (commander, deputy commander, chief of staff, and commanders of the three teams), leaving from 45 to 49 soldiers in the combat units. Of these, probably six served in the Kraków team, and the remaining 39–43 soldiers in Zagra-Lin and the Warsaw team.

The unit primarily consisted of older youth and middle-aged individuals, usually professional soldiers. A distinctive feature of Osa–Kosa 30 was the presence of numerous escapees from German captivity. Key command positions were held by escapees from Oflag II-C in Woldenberg: Zdzisław Pacak-Kuźmirski, Bernard Drzyzga, Jerzy Kleczkowski, Edward Madej, Kazimierz Nowosławski, and Mieczysław Uniejewski. The unit also included Auschwitz-Birkenau escapee Stanisław Jaster, codenamed Hel.

All team and patrol commanders operated under the common codename Bogusław, likely symbolizing the unit's executive officer collective.

== Important operations ==
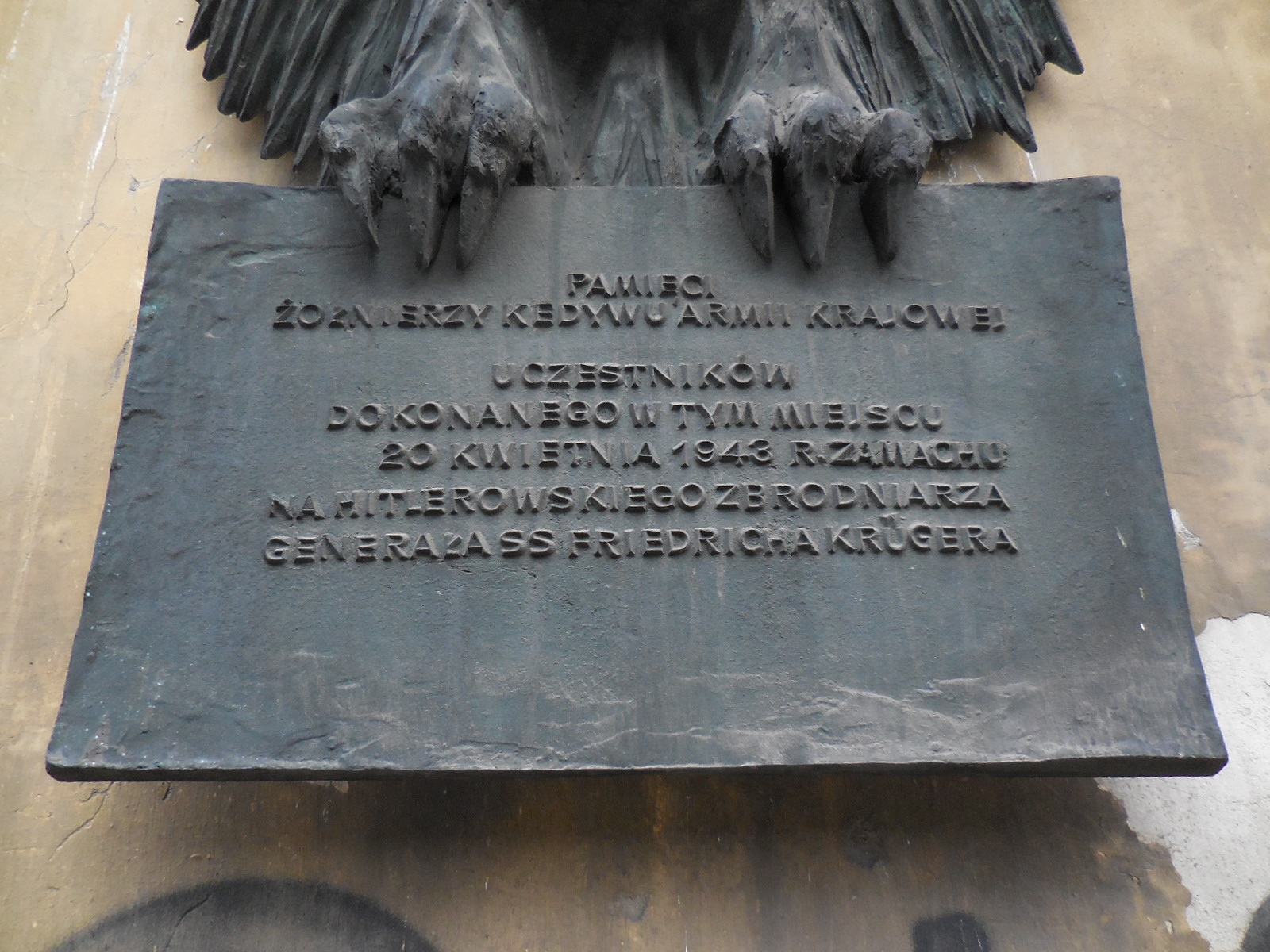
Plaque at 13 Krasiński Avenue in Kraków, commemorating the participants of the assassination attempt on Friedrich-Wilhelm Krüger

The Organization of Special Combat Actions existed for over a year and during this period carried out a series of combat operations in the General Government, the Third Reich, and the Reichskommissariat Ostland. Among them are (in chronological order):

- Bomb attack on the platform of the underground S-Bahn station at Friedrichstraße in Berlin, carried out by Zagra-Lin soldiers (24 February 1943). (Note: Kunicki (1969, pp. 32–33) reports that the attack took place on 13 February 1943, adding that four people were killed and 60 injured as a result.) Home Army informants reported that 36 people were killed and 78 were wounded in the explosion. German press, on the other hand, reported five dead.
- Bomb attack at Berlin Friedrichstraße station (10 April 1943). The bomb, planted by Zagra-Lin soldiers, exploded as two trains carrying Wehrmacht soldiers on leave were stopped at the platform. 14 people were killed and 60 were wounded.
- Elimination of Hugo Dietz, head of group D in the Warsaw Labor Office (Arbeitsamt) and head of the Otwock Labor Office, organizing the deportation of Poles for forced labor to Germany. Conducted in Warsaw on 13 April1943.
- Operation Krüger – the assassination attempt on the Higher SS and Police Leader in the General Government, SS-Obergruppenführer Friedrich-Wilhelm Krüger, carried out in Kraków (20 April 1943). Krüger survived the attempt, likely sustaining only minor injuries. The operation was conducted jointly by soldiers from the Warsaw and Kraków teams.
- Bomb attack at the Wrocław Główny railway station (23 April 1943). The bomb, planted by Zagra-Lin soldiers, exploded as a train carrying Wehrmacht soldiers on leave stopped at the platform. According to Polish sources, 4 soldiers were killed and several were injured. The Germans admitted to only 4 seriously wounded and several lightly injured.
- Blowing up a train carrying ammunition and military equipment near Riga (12 May 1943). The operation was carried out by Zagra-Lin soldiers.
- Blowing up a train carrying food and fodder on the Bydgoszcz–Gdańsk line (24 May 1943). The operation was carried out by Zagra-Lin soldiers.
- Assassination attempt on Gestapo officer Karl Schulz, conducted in Warsaw in May 1943. The action failed as Schulz was only wounded.
- Blowing up three German trains in Lithuania and two more in Latvia (June–July 1943). The attacks were carried out by Zagra-Lin soldiers.
- Attack on a restaurant in Riga, designated as Nur für Deutsche (beginning of July 1943). Up to 100 Germans were killed or wounded in the venue, which was attacked with grenades by Zagra-Lin soldiers.

In 1943, Zagra-Lin planned to blow up Adolf Hitler's special train, which was to pass through Bydgoszcz. Explosives were planted under the tracks about 8 km from the city. Ultimately, the attempt did not take place as the train did not appear on the expected route.

Unlike the Union of Retaliation, which often attributed its actions to communists or other underground organizations to prevent retaliatory repression against civilians, Osa–Kosa 30, on the orders of the Home Army Commander-in-Chief, operated openly under the banner of the Polish Underground State.

== Disbanding of the unit ==
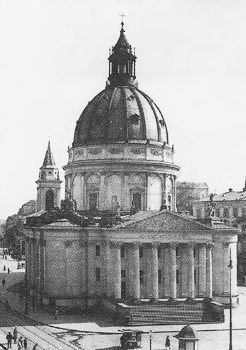
St. Alexander's Church in Warsaw (pre-war appearance), the place of arrest of the unit's soldiers

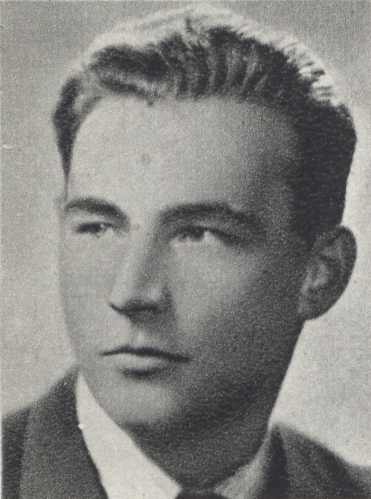
Mieczysław Uniejewski, codenamed Marynarz

On Saturday, 5 June 1943, the Gestapo unexpectedly surrounded St. Alexander's Church at Three Crosses Square in Warsaw, where the wedding of Lieutenant Mieczysław Uniejewski, codenamed Marynarz, commander of one of the patrols of the Warsaw team Osa–Kosa 30, and Teofila Suchanek, sister of a soldier from this unit, was taking place. The Germans arrested almost everyone in the church, including nearly 25 soldiers of the unit, who, against all principles of conspiracy, attended the ceremony in such a large group. Among those arrested were, among others, Lieutenant Jan Papieski, codenamed Jerzy (the first deputy commander), Aleksandra Sokal, codenamed Władka (staff liaison), Andrzej Jankowski, codenamed Jędrek, and Tadeusz Battek, codenamed Góral (soldiers of the Kraków team, participants in the assassination attempt on SS-Obergruppenführer Krüger). A preserved German report indicates that the action was not accidental, as the Gestapo had already obtained information that a wedding involving important figures of the Polish underground would take place that day at St. Alexander's Church. The report also indicates that the Germans' goal was not so much to eliminate Osa–Kosa 30, but to capture those responsible for the attacks on Krüger and the Berlin train station.

89 arrested people were taken to Pawiak, where, after a quick selection, 33 people (mainly elderly and mothers with small children) were released. A much more detailed selection was conducted a few days later. Leon Wanat – a prisoner and chronicler of Pawiak – recalled that some prisoners arrested at St. Alexander's Church were then led to the prison yard, while a man hidden in the interrogation room pointed out to the Germans people associated with the underground. The mentioned German report states that he was associated with the detainees and was secretly brought to Pawiak, where during the confrontation he identified three people: Mieczysław Uniejewski, Aleksandra Sokal, and Krystyna Milli. During further investigations, including based on interrogations and entries from Krystyna Milli's notebook, other soldiers of Osa–Kosa 30 were identified. Most of them were soon executed. The rest were deported to concentration camps or disappeared.

The "bust" at St. Alexander's Church meant the disbandment of the Warsaw team Osa–Kosa 30. Lieutenant Mieczysław Kudelski, codenamed Wiktor, however, attempted to reconstruct it based on soldiers who managed to avoid arrest. On 12 July 1943, Wiktor arranged a meeting with one of them, Stanisław Jaster, codenamed Hel. The meeting took place around 6:00 PM near the intersection of Nowogrodzka and Krucza streets. At some point, a German police car drove up to the conversing Wiktor and Hel. Both soldiers were pulled into the vehicle, which immediately drove off towards the Gestapo headquarters on Szuch Avenue. Shortly afterward, Wiktor died there under torture.

In the face of exposure and disbandment of the unit, the Home Army command decided to dissolve it, which occurred at the end of July 1943. Ten surviving soldiers were incorporated into the Motor 30 unit, into Lieutenant Pola's combat team. They participated in Operation Góral, and later some were transferred to partisan units.

Most of the tasks of the disbanded unit were taken over by the newly formed Agat unit. Based, among other things, on the experiences of Osa–Kosa 30, the Home Army command decided that it would be organized based on scouting youth who had previously served in the Warsaw Assault Groups. Among the former soldiers of Osa–Kosa 30, only the head of the intelligence cell, Second Lieutenant Aleksander Kunicki, codenamed Rayski, his liaison Irena Klimesz, codenamed Bogna, and intelligence officer Ludwik Żurek, codenamed Żak, were assigned to Agat.

=== Case of Stanisław Jaster ===
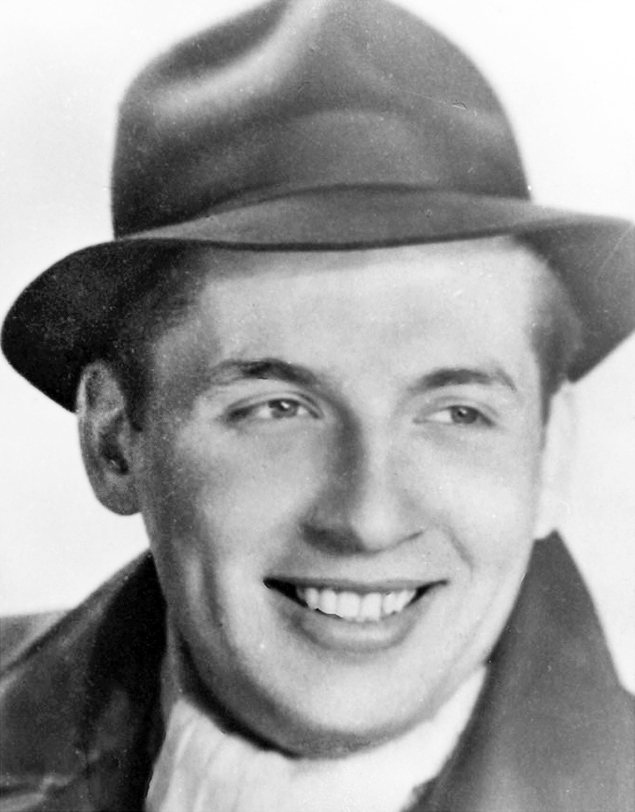
Stanisław Jaster, codenamed Hel

After the war, the disbandment of the unit became the subject of historical research and investigations by the veterans' community. In his memoirs published in 1968, Aleksander Kunicki blamed Stanisław Jaster, codenamed Hel, an Auschwitz-Birkenau escapee and a soldier of the unit, for the exposure of Osa–Kosa 30. Kunicki claimed, citing alleged findings from an investigation by the Home Army counterintelligence, that Jaster's escape from the camp was staged by the Germans to infiltrate the underground. Hel supposedly later betrayed the participants of the wedding at St. Alexander's Church, identified detainees at Pawiak, and finally set a trap for Lieutenant Wiktor. After the latter's arrest, the Gestapo allegedly faked Jaster's escape from a police car; he was supposedly later exposed by the counterintelligence and executed by order of the Polish Underground. A similar account appeared in the 1969 memoirs of Lieutenant Colonel Emil Kumor, codenamed Krzyś, head of the special department of the Home Army General Staff.

Kunicki and Kumor's accusations sparked a long-standing and emotional debate, as many historians and veterans believed Jaster was innocent and that his death was a tragic mistake. Based on the current state of research (2016), especially available archival sources, it can be assumed with a high degree of probability that the accusations against Stanisław Jaster are unfounded. Therefore, the identity of the informant who enabled the Germans to break up the unit remains unresolved. (Note: Irena Klimesz, codenamed Bogna suspected that the "bust" at St. Alexander's Church might have been caused by a tip-off from a jealous friend of the groom. On the other hand, Janusz Kwiatkowski, codenamed Zaruta, was convinced that the German operation at the church, as well as the later arrest of Lieutenant Wiktor, were due to the activities of informants Ludwik Kalkstein, Blanka Kaczorowska, and Eugeniusz Świerczewski (responsible, among other things, for the arrest of General Stefan Rowecki). He also speculated that another Auschwitz escapee, Bolesław Kuczbara, might have additionally contributed to the exposure of Osa–Kosa 30 (Cyra (1986, p. 9)).)

Tomasz Strzembosz, in his monograph Storm Units of Conspiratorial Warsaw, indicated that the leadership of Kosa can be largely blamed for the tragedy of its soldiers, as it did not prevent the massive participation of unit members in the wedding ceremony, and the counterintelligence cell for not detecting the informant.

== Bibliography ==
- Chmielarz, Andrzej (2014). ""Osa"-"Kosa"". In Komorowski, Krzysztof (ed.). Warszawa walczy 1939–1945. Leksykon (in Polish). Warsaw: Fundacja Warszawa Walczy 1939–1945; Bellona SA. ISBN 978-83-1113474-4.
- Cyra, Adam (1986-10-12). "Tragiczna pomyłka". Kierunki. Tygodnik społeczno-kulturalny katolików (in Polish). 41 (1566).
- Czarnecka, Daria (2016). Największa zagadka Polskiego Państwa Podziemnego. Stanisław Gustaw Jaster – człowiek, który zniknął (in Polish). Warsaw: Wydawnictwo Naukowe PWN. ISBN 978-83-01-18809-2.
- Czarnecka, Daria (2014). Sprawa Stanisława Gustawa Jastera ps. "Hel" w historiografii. Kreacja obrazu zdrajcy i obrona (in Polish). Warsaw: Instytut Pamięci Narodowej. ISBN 978-83-7629-721-7.
- Drzyzga, Bernard (2014). Zagra-Lin: oddział sabotażowo-dywersyjny Organizacji Specjalnych Akcji ("Osa", "Kosa") utworzony do realizacji zamachów na terenie Niemiec (in Polish). Kraków: Oficyna Wydawnicza Mireki. ISBN 978-83-64452-35-2.
- Kumor, Emil (1969). Wycinek z historii jednego życia (in Polish). Warsaw: Instytut Wydawniczy PAX.
- Kunicki, Aleksander (1969). Cichy front (in Polish). Warsaw: Instytut Wydawniczy PAX.
- Strzembosz, Tomasz (1983). Oddziały szturmowe konspiracyjnej Warszawy 1939–1944 (in Polish). Warsaw: Państwowe Wydawnictwo Naukowe. ISBN 83-01-04203-6.
- Wanat, Leon (1958). Za murami Pawiaka (in Polish). Warsaw: Książka i Wiedza.
- Wilamowski, Jacek; Kopczuk, Włodzimierz (1990). Tajemnicze wsypy. Polsko-niemiecka wojna na tajnym froncie (in Polish). Warsaw: Instytut Wydawniczy Związków Zawodowych. ISBN 83-202-0856-4.
- Wywiał, Przemysław (2013). "W biały dzień". Pamięć.pl (in Polish). 4 (13). ISSN 2084-7319.
