= Disbandment of Osa–Kosa 30 =

Arrest of soldiers from the Osa–Kosa 30 unit

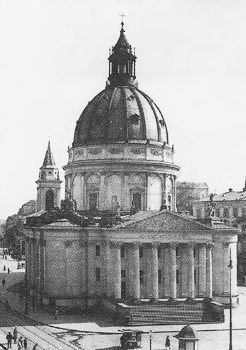
St. Alexander's Church in Warsaw (pre-war appearance) was the location where soldiers of the Osa–Kosa 30 unit were arrested

The disbandment of Osa–Kosa 30 refers to the arrest by the Gestapo of dozens of soldiers from the Organization of Special Combat Actions (Osa–Kosa 30), who had gathered on 5 June 1943 for the wedding of a comrade in Warsaw's St. Alexander's Church. On 12 July 1943, the chief of staff of Osa–Kosa 30, Lieutenant Mieczysław Kudelski, codenamed Wiktor, who had attempted to reconstruct the unit, was also arrested. These events forced the command of the Home Army to dissolve the unit.

The arrested soldiers were either killed or disappeared without a trace. The breakup of Osa–Kosa 30 was one of the most devastating blows dealt to the Polish Underground State by the German security apparatus. The identity of the informant who enabled the Gestapo to infiltrate the unit remains unresolved to this day.

== Origins ==
Established in May 1942, the Organization of Special Combat Actions (Osa) was a task force under the command of the Chief Commander of the Home Army, executing combat operations on his direct orders. Its area of operation encompassed the entire General Government and, since December 1942, also included pre-war German territories and Polish lands annexed to the Reich. Osa was entrusted with tasks of special significance, such as the elimination of high-ranking Nazi dignitaries and particularly cruel representatives of the occupying apparatus, as well as conducting "major diversion" operations. For this reason, the unit employed extensive means of secrecy and remained separate from other structures of the Home Army.

At the beginning of 1943, Osa was incorporated into the structures of Kedyw, and its name was simultaneously changed to Kosa 30. (Note: In Polish historiography, the unit is usually referred to by the dual name Osa–Kosa 30 (Czarnecka (2014, p. 97)).) However, the unit retained its existing structure, nearly unchanged personnel composition, and a high degree of autonomy.

Osa–Kosa 30 existed for over a year. During this period, its soldiers conducted a series of combat actions in the areas of the General Government and the Third Reich. One of these was an unsuccessful attempt to assassinate on 20 April 1943 in Kraków the Higher SS and Police Leader, SS-Obergruppenführer Friedrich-Wilhelm Krüger, as well as bomb attacks in Berlin and Wrocław.

== "Bust" in St. Alexander's Church ==
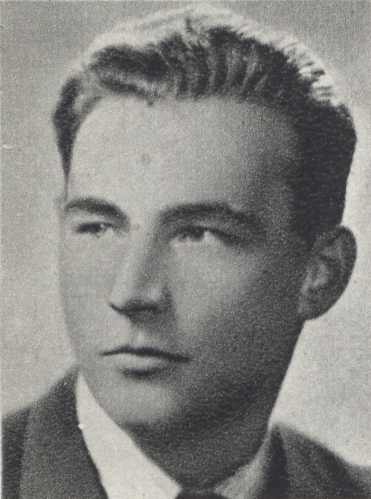
Mieczysław Uniejewski, codenamed Marynarz

On Saturday, 5 June 1943, at 12:00 PM, a wedding took place at St. Alexander's Church in Warsaw's Three Crosses Square for Lieutenant Mieczysław Uniejewski, codenamed Marynarz, an officer of Osa–Kosa 30, using the cover name Ludwik Raczyński, (Note: Lieutenant of the Polish Navy Mieczysław Uniejewski, codenames Matros, Marynarz, Bogusław Marynarz, fought in the September campaign, after which he ended up in German captivity. In May 1942, he escaped from Oflag II-C. He then joined the ranks of Osa–Kosa 30, taking command of one of the three patrols in its Warsaw unit (Strzembosz (1983, pp. 58, 212)).) and Teofila Suchanek, the sister of a soldier from this unit (daughter of the painter Antoni Suchanek). Approximately 25 soldiers from the unit attended the ceremony, including Lieutenant Jan Papieski, codenamed Jerzy (first deputy commander), Aleksandra Sokal, codenamed Władka (staff liaison), as well as Andrzej Jankowski, codenamed Jędrek, and Tadeusz Battek, codenamed Góral (soldiers from the Kraków center, (Note: The Organization of Special Combat Actions was divided into three centers/combat teams: the Warsaw team, the Kraków team, and the Zagra-Lin team, which conducted sabotage operations in the territory of the Third Reich (Strzembosz (1983, pp. 57, 209–211)).) participants in the assassination attempt on Krüger). Relatives of the couple, civilian wedding guests, and a large group of onlookers were also present.

The participation of so many soldiers in the ceremony represented a severe violation of basic conspiracy principles. Many years after the war, it emerged that even the boys from the church choir were aware that an "important person from the underground" would be at the wedding. Nevertheless, the commander of Osa–Kosa 30, Colonel Józef Szajewski, codenamed Philips, approved the organization of the event. As a result, on June 5, only a few members of the unit were absent from the church. (Note: Among those absent were: Lieutenant Colonel Józef Szajewski, codenamed Philips (commander), Lieutenant Mieczysław Kudelski, codenamed Wiktor (chief of staff, second deputy commander), Second Lieutenant Jerzy Kleczkowski, codenamed Jurek (commander of the Warsaw center), Lieutenant Edward Madej, codenamed Felek (commander of the Kraków center), Lieutenant Aleksander Kunicki, codenamed Rayski (head of the intelligence unit) along with his liaison Irena Klimesz, codenamed Bogna, and Stanisław Gustaw Jaster, codenamed Hel. All members of the Zagra-Lin team also avoided arrest (Czarnecka (2014, p. 105); Drzyzga (2014, p. 174)).)

At the end of the ceremony, after the couple had moved away from the altar, the Germans surrounded the church with significant forces, and according to some sources, they also surrounded Three Crosses Square and the entrances to nearby streets. The newlyweds were detained in the sacristy, and the other guests were called to exit the temple, where waiting trucks had already been prepared. The surprised soldiers of Osa–Kosa 30 did not resist. The enemy's advantage was too great, and moreover, it could not be ruled out that the wedding guests were victims of a random roundup, which had become a daily occurrence in occupied Warsaw and did not spare churches either. Many conspirators had well-forged documents, so they might have hoped to escape from the Germans.

A total of 89 people were detained. Two members of the unit, Stefan Smarzyński, codenamed Balon, and Antoni Suchanek, codenamed Andrzejek (the bride's brother), avoided arrest by leaving the church just before the ceremony began to buy photographic film. According to some sources, several unidentified individuals reportedly hid in the church's basement and near the coffin and catafalque in the corner after the Germans burst in.

The detained newlyweds and the entire wedding party were taken directly to Pawiak. There, the Germans conducted a quick selection, after which 33 individuals were released, deemed not to be connected to the underground (mainly older individuals and mothers with small children). The remaining 56 detainees were placed in cells.

Shortly afterward, events occurred that revealed the Gestapo's operation was not random. Leon Wanat – a prisoner and chronicler of Pawiak – recalled that after a few days, some of the prisoners arrested at St. Alexander's Church were successively taken to the prison yard. At the same time, a man hiding behind a window frame was waiting in the interrogation room. This man, "of average height, slim, with dark skin and dark hair", pointed out to the Germans individuals connected to the underground. (Note: One of the arrested soldiers of Osa–Kosa 30, Andrzej Komierowski, codenamed Andrzej, described these events somewhat differently. In a message sent from Pawiak, he informed that during the confrontation, the informant was in one of the side rooms and remained hidden behind a frosted glass door. Andrzej had no doubts that the traitor knew the members of the unit well (Smarzyński & Stachiewicz (1971, p. 5)). In a letter sent in 1971 to the magazine Polityka, Leon Wanat, however, questioned the information contained in the message, pointing out, among other things, that the interrogation room was isolated from other prison spaces and that there were no glass doors at Pawiak (Czarnecka (2014, pp. 33–34)).) Following this identification, another group of detainees was released.

Additional information about the events was provided in a report dated 9 June 1943 prepared for SS-Obergruppenführer Krüger. It revealed that the aim of the German operation was not so much to eliminate Osa–Kosa 30 as to capture those responsible for the assassination attempts on Krüger and the Berlin Friedrichstraße station. German intelligence had previously obtained information that on June 5 at 12:00 PM, a wedding would take place at St. Alexander's Church involving important figures from the Polish underground, including the perpetrators of the mentioned actions. (Note: Wilamowski & Kopczuk (1990, p. 177), who did not have access to this report, hypothesized that the encirclement of the St. Alexander's Church by the Germans was improvised, possibly initiated by an informant who recognized one or more persons sought by the security police among the wedding guests.) The report did not disclose the informant's identity, only stating that he was connected to those arrested and was secretly brought to Pawiak, where, during the confrontation, he identified three individuals: Mieczysław Uniejewski, Aleksandra Sokal, and Krystyna Milli, codenamed Krysia. Additionally, a notebook was found with the last individual, the entries of which led the Germans to Tadeusz Battek. A counterintelligence operation was launched against him, utilizing the fact that his father was in a German prisoner of war camp. Similar actions were also taken against the other perpetrator of the assassination attempt on Krüger, Andrzej Jankowski; in this case, however, they played on his radically anti-communist beliefs. Ultimately, the Gestapo's efforts were completely successful – both young soldiers revealed all their underground connections to the Germans.

The arrest of the wedding participants reverberated throughout occupied Warsaw.

== Arrest of Wiktor ==
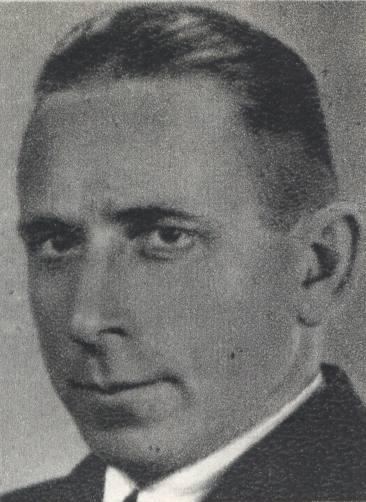
Mieczysław Kudelski, codenamed Wiktor

The security breach at St. Alexander's Church resulted in the dismantling of the Warsaw unit of Osa–Kosa 30. However, Lieutenant Mieczysław Kudelski, codenamed Wiktor, chief of the unit's inner staff, made an attempt to rebuild it based on soldiers who had managed to avoid arrest.

On 12 July 1943, Wiktor arranged a meeting with one of the surviving soldiers, Stanisław Gustaw Jaster, codenamed Hel. The meeting took place around 6:00 PM near the corner of Nowogrodzka and Krucza streets. At some point, a German police car pulled up to where Wiktor and Hel were talking. Both Poles were dragged into the vehicle, which immediately sped off in the direction of the Gestapo headquarters at 25 Szuch Avenue. The witness to this event was reportedly the adjutant of the Home Army Commander-in-Chief, Captain Ryszard Jamontt-Krzywicki, codenamed Szymon, who was scheduled to meet Wiktor at the same time.

Sources provide conflicting information about the exact course of the arrest. In his memoirs titled Cichy front (Silent Front), Aleksander Kunicki states that Wiktor first greeted Szymon at the Aperitif café on Nowogrodzka Street, where they had arranged to meet, and then went for his conversation with Hel, assuring that it would only take about 15 minutes. In contrast, according to Szymon's account, contained in Emil Kumor's memoirs (Wycinek z historii jednego życia [Excerpt from the History of One Life]), Wiktor arrived at the meeting point at 5:45 PM, after which he asked the owner of the café, Klemens Zakrzewski, to inform Szymon to wait for him a little longer. Ten minutes later, Szymon, who was walking with Kazimierz Gorzkowski, turning from Jerusalem Avenue onto Krucza Street, reportedly saw a Gestapo car driving along Nowogrodzka Street. Shortly after, he saw Wiktor and Hel standing against a wall under German guard. Szymon immediately informed the Home Army Commander-in-Chief, General Stefan Rowecki, codenamed Grot, about the incident. However, Daria Czarnecka points out that Captain Krzywicki's account contains several questionable details. From the location he indicated, he could not have seen the German car. It is also impossible that he could have reported the incident to Grot, as Grot had been arrested by the Germans 12 days earlier.

== Aftermath ==
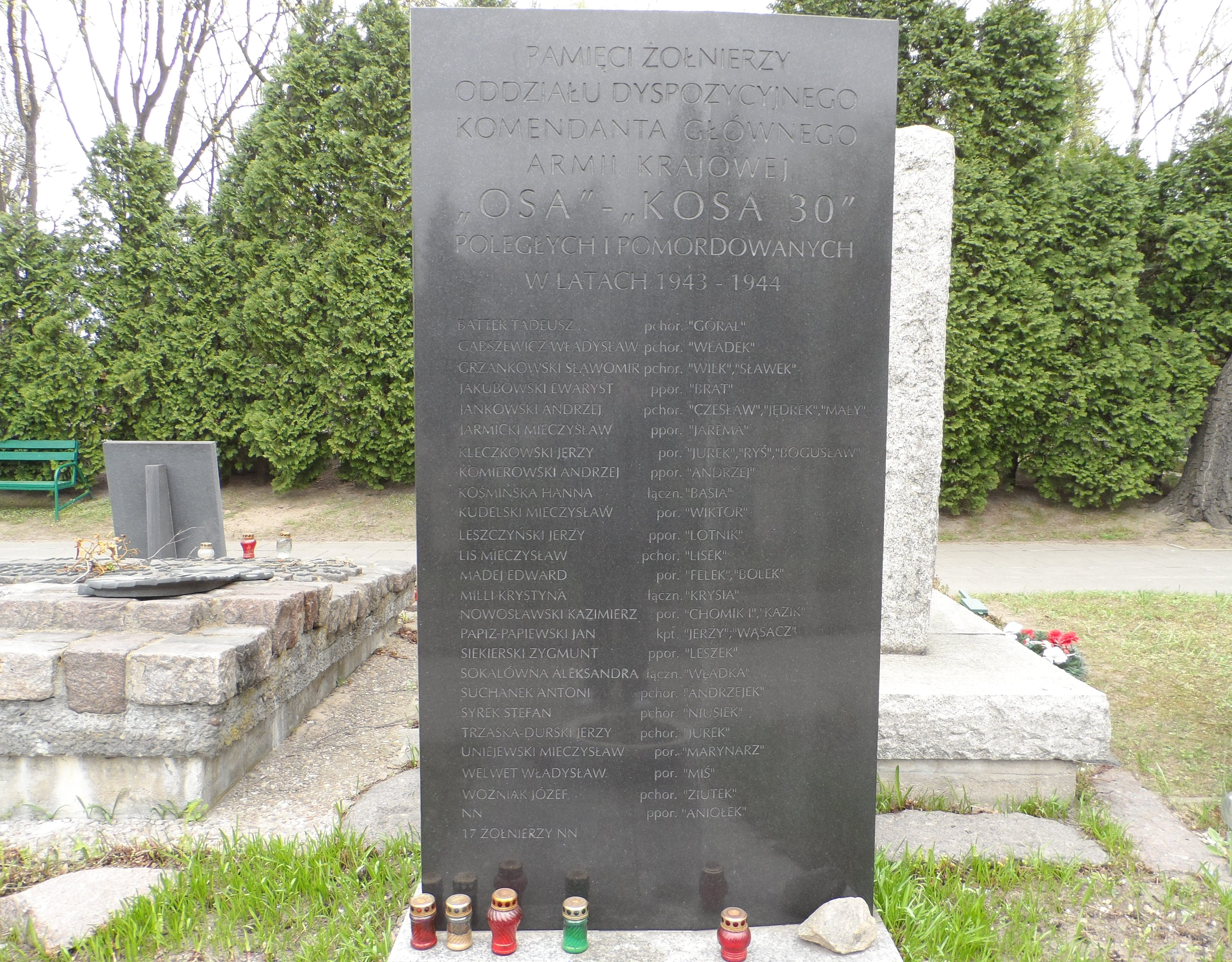
Plaque at the Powązki Military Cemetery that commemorates the fallen and murdered soldiers of Osa–Kosa 30

The surviving soldiers of Osa–Kosa 30 claimed that the Home Army had made some preparations to rescue their captured comrades. However, the planned operation never took place because the Germans did not transport the detainees to the Gestapo headquarters on Szuch Avenue for interrogation. Instead, they conducted the investigation directly at Pawiak. It is said that the commander of the Sicherheitsdienst and Sicherheitspolizei for the Warsaw District, SS-Obersturmbannführer Ludwig Hahn, personally participated in the interrogations.

Around 20 June 1943, Aleksandra Sokal, codenamed Władka, the tortured liaison of the staff, committed suicide at Szuch Avenue. (Note: Such a version of her death was presented, among others, by Julian Eugeniusz Kulski. On the other hand, Leon Wanat claimed that Aleksandra Sokal was executed by a firing squad on 17 September 1943, along with the other soldiers of Osa–Kosa 30 (Czarnecka (2016, pp. 139–140)).) The other individuals arrested at St. Alexander's Church were subjected to a summary trial presided over by Ludwig Hahn. On 17 September 1943, in the ruins of the Warsaw Ghetto, the Germans executed 12 men and two women who had been detained at St. Alexander's Church. Among those killed were: Tadeusz Battek, codenamed Góral; Władysław Gabszewicz, codenamed Władek; Andrzej Jankowski, codenamed Jędrek; Mieczysław Jarmicki, codenamed Korwin; Andrzej Komierowski, codenamed Andrzej; Anna Janina Kośmińska, codenamed Basia; Krystyna Milli, codenamed Krysia; Jan Papieski, codenamed Jerzy; Stefan Syrek, codenamed Niusek; Jerzy Trzaska-Durski, codenamed Jurek; and Władysław Welwet, codenamed Miś. A few weeks later, the groom, Mieczysław Uniejewski, was also executed. The remaining detainees were deported to concentration camps or disappeared without a trace. Among those sent to Auschwitz-Birkenau was the bride, Teofila Suchanek, along with her parents (all three survived the concentration camps). Lieutenant Wiktor was tortured to death at Szuch Avenue shortly after his arrest. Despite the brutal torture, he did not betray anyone.

In the face of the unit's exposure and destruction, the Home Army command decided to disband it, which occurred at the end of July 1943. Ten surviving soldiers were incorporated into the Motor 30 unit under the command of Lieutenant Roman Kiźny, codenamed Pola. After some time, some of them were transferred to partisan units. (Note: Only a few soldiers from the Warsaw unit of Osa–Kosa 30 managed to survive the war. The commander of the unit, Second Lieutenant Jerzy Kleczkowski, codenamed Ryś, was arrested in December 1943. He was killed during a street execution on 10 February 1944. The bride's brother, Antoni Suchanek, codenamed Andrzejek, fell during a combat action in November 1943 (Strzembosz (1983, p. 213)).) Second Lieutenant Aleksander Kunicki, codenamed Rayski, along with his liaison Irena Klimesz, codenamed Bogna, and intelligence officer Ludwik Żurek, codenamed Żak, were transferred to the Agat unit, which took over most of the tasks previously handled by Osa–Kosa 30.

The disbandment of the unit forced the Home Army command to postpone the Operation Góral that was being prepared at the time. Eventually, the operation was entrusted to Pola’s team, in which the surviving soldiers of Osa–Kosa 30 served.

== Case of Stanisław Jaster ==
The dismantling of Osa–Kosa 30 was one of the most severe blows dealt to the Polish Underground State by the German security apparatus. A detailed investigation into the "infiltration" at St. Alexander's Church was personally ordered by the Commander of the Home Army, General Stefan Rowecki, codenamed Grot. After the war, this matter also became the subject of research by historians and investigations from the veterans' community.

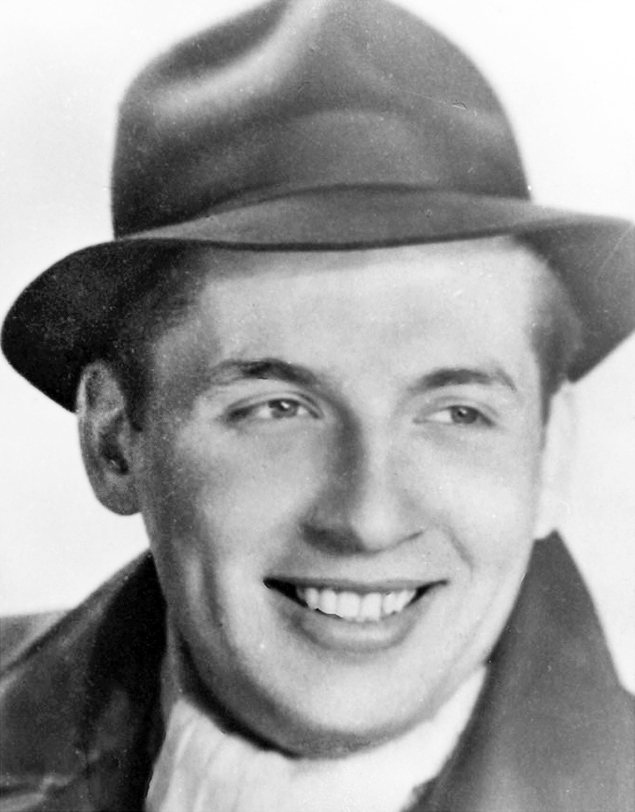
Stanisław Gustaw Jaster, codenamed Hel

An extensive and emotional debate was sparked by the memoirs of Aleksander Kunicki, codenamed Rayski, published in 1968 under the title Cichy front. The author placed the blame for the dismantling of Osa–Kosa 30 on the escapee from Auschwitz-Birkenau and a soldier of that unit, Stanisław Gustaw Jaster, codenamed Hel. Kunicki devoted an entire chapter to this matter, titled Traitor. It contained information indicating that the role played by Hel began to be analyzed for the first time after the arrest of Wiktor. The courier Irena Klimesz, codenamed Bogna, testified that he exhibited great interest in the command of the unit and the network of its contact points. Suspicions that the counterintelligence held against Jaster turned into certainty when he unexpectedly returned to his comrades. He claimed that immediately after his arrest, he managed to jump out of a German car, sustaining a non-life-threatening gunshot wound to the leg. However, medical examinations showed that the wound was from a 7 mm caliber bullet, whereas witnesses to the arrest stated that the escort was armed with 9 mm caliber submachine guns. Moreover, the wound was relatively shallow, did not involve any bone damage, and was inflicted from such a close distance that powder burns were visible on its edge. Hel could not convincingly explain these doubts. Additionally, there was supposed to be a witness who claimed to have seen Jaster leaving the Gestapo headquarters at Szuch Avenue under his own power. During the interrogations, Jaster allegedly broke down and confessed to treason. It was he who reportedly revealed to the Germans the participants of the wedding ceremony, identified those detained at Pawiak, and later set a trap for Lieutenant Wiktor. He also allegedly testified that his escape from Auschwitz was staged by the Politische Abteilung (camp Gestapo) to legitimize him in underground circles. He assured that the other three escapees were unaware of his treachery. Kunicki concluded as follows: "The traitor and Gestapo informant Stanisław Jaster, codenamed Hel, was sentenced to death by the court of the Home Army. The sentence was executed".

A year later, the Pax Publishing House published the memoirs of the late in 1957 Lieutenant Colonel Emil Kumor, codenamed Krzyś, the head of the special department of the Home Army's General Staff, in which the author included the account of Captain Ryszard Jamontt-Krzywicki regarding the arrest of Lieutenant Wiktor and the course of the investigation into Hel. This account confirmed the accusations made in Kunicki's memoirs, although the two accounts differed in certain details.

The accusations against Jaster caused great agitation among his relatives and acquaintances, as well as within the veterans' community. Numerous articles were dedicated to this case in the press (including in Polish diaspora newspapers), as well as many mentions in historical and memoir literature. Many letters and statements were also directed to the press, publications, authorities of veterans' organizations, and the Auschwitz-Birkenau State Museum. During the debate, which has intermittently lasted for 45 years, Jaster's defenders presented several arguments supporting his innocence. (Note: With support for Kunicki, Piotr Stachiewicz, a veteran and chronicler of the Parasol Battalion, and one of the last surviving soldiers of Osa–Kosa 30, Stefan Smarzyński, codenamed Balon, emerged. In the article Żołnierz czy konfident? published in July 1971 in the weekly magazine Polityka, they presented arguments that, in their opinion, indicated Jaster's guilt (Smarzyński & Stachiewicz (1971, pp. 1, 4–9)). However, many of these arguments were later effectively challenged (Kwiatkowski & Raciborski (1991, p. III); Czarnecka (2016, pp. 168, 170–171)).) It was shown that Kunicki and Kumor, whose authority as distinguished Home Army officers legitimized the accusations against Jaster, did not actually participate in the investigation conducted in his case and obtained all information – through third parties – from the deceased Captain Ryszard Jamontt-Krzywicki. Kunicki even spoke highly of Hel as late as the end of the 1950s. The claims that Jaster's escape from the camp was arranged by the Gestapo were challenged, pointing out that its consequence was the arrest of his parents (both perished in Auschwitz). Furthermore, preserved German documents not only do not provide any evidence to support the claim of a staged escape but indicate that an intensive manhunt was launched against the escapees, and their names were entered into the books of wanted persons. The defenders of Hel emphasized that although he was a member of the Military Organization Union established in Auschwitz by Lieutenant Witold Pilecki and had extensive contacts in the Warsaw underground, his alleged treachery did not result in any arrests in the camp resistance movement or in other Home Army units in the capital, aside from Osa–Kosa 30. They pointed out that Jaster did not match the description of an informant from Pawiak, and aside from the words of Kunicki and Kumor, no evidence confirms that Home Army counterintelligence conducted an investigation into him or that the case was considered by a Military Special Court. They also demonstrated that the nature of the injuries he sustained during his escape from the German car had a credible explanation and that his alleged confession could have been obtained under torture. Finally, Janusz Kwiatkowski, codenamed Zaruta – a Home Army soldier and acquaintance of Hel – claimed he was an eyewitness to his escape from the Gestapo car on 12 July 1943.

Daria Czarnecka, who reanalyzed available evidence in her books published in 2014 and 2016, including archival documents not previously studied in the context of this case, concludes that "there is no strong evidence of Staszek's guilt; moreover, there is much to support his innocence", while assessing that unless new documents emerge, "this case can be considered closed". She also believes that Jaster "fell victim to an underground error".

Despite numerous appeals, the World Association of Home Army Soldiers and other institutions and organizations long refused to grant Stanisław Jaster official rehabilitation. Only on 25 September 2019 was he posthumously awarded the Knight's Cross of the Order of Polonia Restituta by the decision of the President of Poland, Andrzej Duda. This gesture is interpreted as his symbolic rehabilitation.

To this day, the exact circumstances of Jaster's death remain unknown. (Note: The fact that there is a lack of evidence confirming that Jaster's case was investigated by the Home Army counterintelligence or examined by the Military Special Court may indicate that he fell victim to extrajudicial punishment by his fellow conspirators. Józef Saski speculated that the order for Hel's liquidation was given by Captain Ryszard Jamontt-Krzywicki, codenamed Szymon, and the sentence was carried out by soldiers from his three-man protective team under the command of Jerzy Nowakowski, codenamed Jureczek (Kwiatkowski & Raciborski (1991, p. III)). However, based on information contained in preserved German documents, it is also possible that Jaster was killed by the Germans shortly after his arrest (Czarnecka (2014, pp. 114–115)).) This case remains one of the most mysterious and controversial episodes in the history of the Polish Underground State.

=== Alternative hypotheses ===
During the debate regarding the alleged betrayal of Stanisław Jaster, alternative hypotheses were also presented concerning the identity of the informant who facilitated the infiltration of the unit by the Germans. Irena Klimesz, codenamed Bogna, suggested that the "leak" at St. Alexander's Church may have been caused by a report made by a jealous female friend of the groom. On the other hand, Janusz Kwiatkowski, codenamed Zaruta, was convinced that the German operation in the church, as well as the subsequent arrest of Lieutenant Wiktor, were the result of the activities of informants Ludwik Kalkstein, Blanka Kaczorowska, and Eugeniusz Świerczewski (who were responsible, among others, for the arrest of General Grot). He also suspected that another fugitive from Auschwitz, Bolesław Kuczbara (arrested on 20 March 1943 – three months after his escape from the camp), might have additionally contributed to the deconspiracy of Osa–Kosa 30.

Tomasz Strzembosz, in his monograph Oddziały szturmowe konspiracyjnej Warszawy, pointed out that "a large part of the blame for the tragedy of the soldiers of Kosa can be attributed to its leadership, which did not prevent the mass participation of unit members in the wedding ceremony, as well as to the counterintelligence unit, which failed to detect the informant".

== Film ==
Scenes referencing the "leak" at St. Alexander's Church were depicted in the series Days of Honor.

The fate of Stanisław Gustaw Jaster, codenamed Hel, is the subject of the documentary film Jaster. Tajemnica Hela, directed by Marek Tomasz Pawłowski and Małgorzata Walczak, which premiered on 13 September 2014.

== Bibliography ==
- Czarnecka, Daria (2016). Największa zagadka Polskiego Państwa Podziemnego. Stanisław Gustaw Jaster – człowiek, który zniknął [The Greatest Mystery of the Polish Underground State. Stanisław Gustaw Jaster – The Man Who Disappeared] (in Polish). Warsaw: Wydawnictwo Naukowe PWN. ISBN 978-83-01-18809-2.
- Czarnecka, Daria (2014). Sprawa Stanisława Gustawa Jastera ps. "Hel" w historiografii. Kreacja obrazu zdrajcy i obrona [The Case of Stanisław Gustaw Jaster "Hel" in Historiography. The Creation of the Traitor Image and His Defense] (in Polish). Warsaw: Instytut Pamięci Narodowej. ISBN 978-83-7629-721-7.
- Drzyzga, Bernard (2014). Zagra-Lin: oddział sabotażowo-dywersyjny Organizacji Specjalnych Akcji ("Osa", "Kosa") utworzony do realizacji zamachów na terenie Niemiec [Zagra-Lin: a sabotage and diversion unit of Special Action Organization ("Osa", "Kosa") established to carry out assassinations on German territory] (in Polish). Kraków: Oficyna Wydawnicza Mireki. ISBN 978-83-64452-35-2.
- Kumor, Emil (1969). Wycinek z historii jednego życia [A snippet from the history of one life] (in Polish). Warsaw: Instytut Wydawniczy PAX.
- Kunicki, Aleksander (1969). Cichy front [The silent front] (in Polish). Warsaw: Instytut Wydawniczy PAX.
- Kwiatkowski, Janusz; Raciborski, Wiesław (22 February 1991). "Dramat Stanisława Gustawa Jastera ps. "Hel"" [The drama of Stanisław Gustaw Jaster "Hel"]. Polska Zbrojna (in Polish). 38 (92).
- Smarzyński, Stefan; Stachiewicz, Piotr (24 July 1971). "Żołnierz czy konfident?" [Soldier or informant?]. Polityka (in Polish). 30 (751).
- Strzembosz, Tomasz (1983). Oddziały szturmowe konspiracyjnej Warszawy 1939–1944 [Assault units of underground Warsaw 1939–1944] (in Polish). Warsaw: Państwowe Wydawnictwo Naukowe. ISBN 83-01-04203-6.
- Wanat, Leon (1958). Za murami Pawiaka [Behind the walls of Pawiak] (in Polish). Warsaw: Książka i Wiedza.
- Wilamowski, Jacek; Kopczuk, Włodzimierz (1990). Tajemnicze wsypy. Polsko-niemiecka wojna na tajnym froncie [Mysterious infiltrations. The Polish-German war on the secret front] (in Polish). Warsaw: Instytut Wydawniczy Związków Zawodowych. ISBN 83-202-0856-4.
