= Stanisław Gustaw Jaster =

Polish escapee from Auschwitz (1921–1943)

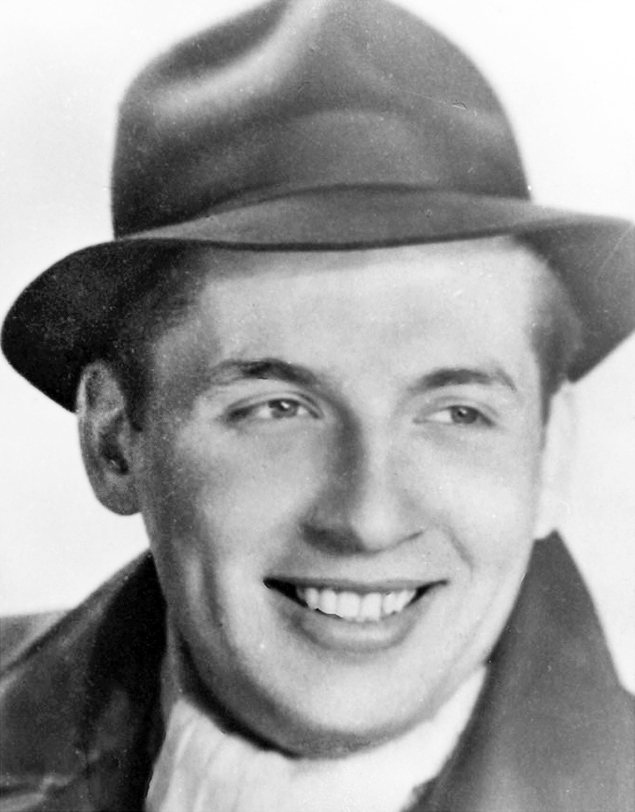
- Born: January 1, 1921; Lviv
- Died: c. July 12, 1942; Warsaw
- Military career
- Branch: Home Army
- Nickname: Hel
- Unit: Organization of Special Combat Actions
- Conflicts: World War II; Celestynów Operation
- Awards: Order of Polonia Restituta

Stanisław Gustaw Jaster, codenamed Hel (pronounced [staˈɲiswaf ˈɡustaf ˈjastɛr]; born 1 January 1921 in Lviv, died after 12 July 1943 in Warsaw) was a Polish scout, an escapee from the Auschwitz concentration camp, and a soldier of the Home Army.

He went missing under unexplained circumstances after 12 July 1943; presumably murdered by fellow conspirators. In 1968, he was accused by Aleksander Kunicki of collaborating with the Gestapo and causing the dismantling of the special unit Osa–Kosa 30, which initiated a long-standing and emotional debate. According to many historians and veterans, Jaster was innocent, and his death was the result of a tragic mistake. This case was one of the most mysterious and controversial episodes in the history of the Polish Underground State.

On 25 September 2019, Jaster was posthumously awarded the Knight's Cross of the Order of Polonia Restituta, which can be seen as his symbolic rehabilitation.

== Biography ==
=== Pre-war period ===
Stanisław Gustaw Jaster was born on 1 January 1921 in Lviv, the elder of two sons of Stanisław Jaster and his wife, Eugenia née Sosnowska. The Jaster family was known for its patriotic traditions. Stanisław Senior, a recipient of several honors, including the Virtuti Militari Order, was involved in independence activities since his school days and, after the outbreak of World War I, volunteered for the Polish Legions. Between 1914 and 1915, he fought in the ranks of the 2nd Infantry Regiment, suffering severe wounds during the Battle of Rarańcza. He also participated in the Battle of Lemberg (1918) and left the ranks of the newly formed Polish Armed Forces with the rank of major (1929). Eugenia Jaster, in her youth, was a member of the Women's Unit of the Polish Rifle Squads in Lviv and later served as a nurse in the Polish Legions and during the defense of Lviv.

In the 1930s, the Jaster family's financial situation was difficult. After leaving government service in 1936, an unemployed Stanisław Senior was forced for a time to run a fruit and vegetable stall at Mier Halls (with the help of his sons). Thanks to his mother's efforts, who was employed at the Municipal Savings Bank, the family managed to avoid a drastic decline in their standard of living.

During his adolescence, Stanisław Gustaw was known as a rebellious and restless boy. Due to behavioral issues, he frequently changed schools: he initially attended the Prince Józef Poniatowski State Boys' Gymnasium in Warsaw, then transferred to Cadet Corps No. 1 in Lviv. He completed the fourth class and passed his junior high exams, but after a year, he left voluntarily, discouraged by the relationships in the corps. He was eventually admitted to the Tadeusz Czacki State Gymnasium and High School in Warsaw, where he passed his final high school exams in May 1939. According to some sources, he planned to pursue studies at the Faculty of Architecture of the Warsaw University of Technology, but the outbreak of World War II prevented this.

Like his parents, he was a member of the scouting movement. He participated in numerous sports, but his greatest passion was sailing, and he earned a skipper's license for Inland Yacht Navigation. Among his peers, he was known for his camaraderie, daring, and physical prowess. At the same time, he showed an interest in the arts, particularly in painting.

=== From the September Campaign to arrest ===
In September 1939, along with his father and younger brother, Stanisław Gustaw Jaster likely participated in the defense of Warsaw. Before the city's capitulation, the Jaster family allegedly hid a large cache of weapons in their apartment at 11/13 Pogonowski Street in Żoliborz.

After the beginning of the German occupation, the Jaster family became involved in underground activities. Their apartment was used to store weapons and banned books, hold secret meetings, and read clandestine press. During this time, Stanisław Gustaw likely established contact with two members of the Union of Armed Struggle, who later played significant roles in the Warsaw resistance: Stanisław Janusz Sosabowski and Ludwik Berger.

Despite the war and occupation, he did not abandon his artistic interests. It is known that he attended clandestine courses in painting and drawing techniques organised by the painter Antoni Suchanek.

=== Imprisonment and escape from Auschwitz ===
On 19 September 1940, Stanisław Gustaw Jaster was arrested during a large roundup carried out by the Germans in Żoliborz. His capture was the result of an unfortunate coincidence; while fleeing from the Germans, he hid with a group of younger boys in the ruins of a burned villa. At one point, one of the escapees accidentally knocked a brick, which fell near an officer standing by the building. The alerted Germans arrested the Poles hiding in the ruins; after some time, the younger boys were released, but Jaster, being the oldest among them, was accused of attempting an attack on the officer and imprisoned in Pawiak. On 21 November 1940, he was transported to Auschwitz concentration camp. In a group of 300 prisoners, he arrived at the camp the next day.

In Auschwitz, he was assigned the camp number 6438. As a prisoner, he first worked on road construction in the so-called Strassenbaukommando, (Note: Commando responsible for road construction (Czarnecka (2016, p. 82)).) and later in the SS warehouses located in the former Tobacco Monopoly buildings (Hauptwirtschaftslager, or HWL). In 1941, he contracted typhus but managed to recover. His family made unsuccessful attempts to have him released from the camp by appealing to the German authorities. During his time in Auschwitz, Jaster joined the underground Military Organization Union, formed by cavalry officer Witold Pilecki. He did not abandon his passion for painting. According to his fiancée, Anna Danuta Sławińska, he even painted portraits of SS officers and prisoner functionaries in exchange for food and favors.

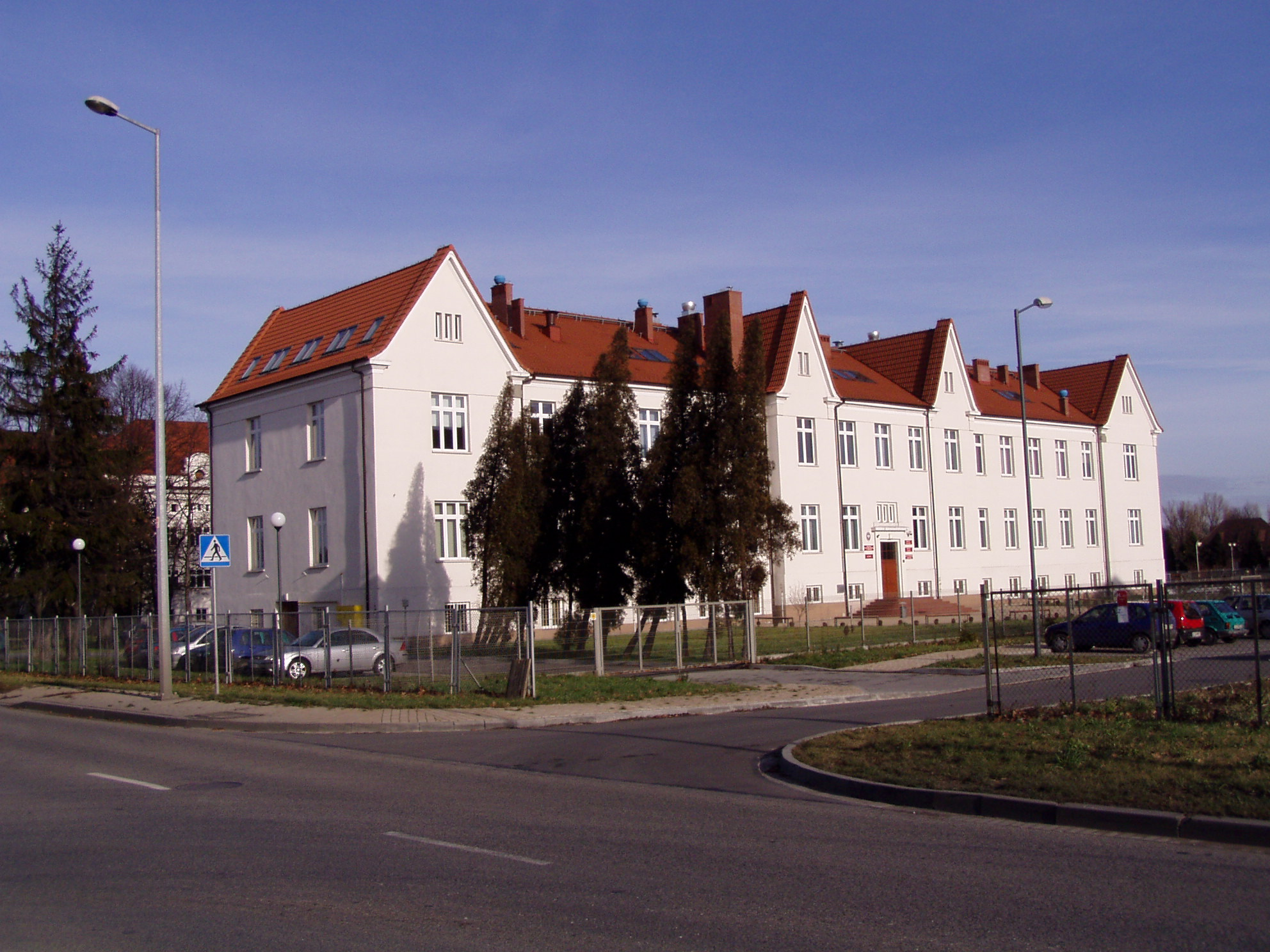
Pre-war Tobacco Monopoly building in Oświęcim, where the HWL warehouses were located

One of the prisoners working in the HWL garages was Eugeniusz Bendera. In the spring of 1942, the Politische Abteilung (the camp Gestapo) placed him on a list of people scheduled for execution, but the sentence was postponed due to the need for Bendera to finish repairing several cars. With nothing to lose, he decided to risk escaping from the camp. He confided his plan to two prisoners working in HWL: Kazimierz Piechowski (a scout from Tczew), and later Józef Lempart (a monk from Wadowice). The escape plan aimed to prevent retaliatory measures against fellow prisoners by having the escapees pose as members of a fake work commando operating a platform cart (Rollwagenkommando). Typically, such commandos consisted of four prisoners, so the conspirators, to avoid suspicion, had to find a fourth person. The escape was proposed to Alfons Kiprowski, who, however, withdrew when the plan's authors refused to allow his close friend to join the group. Another friend of Piechowski, Tadeusz Banasiewicz, also declined. Ultimately, Stanisław Jaster joined the group. His selection was based on his acquaintance with Piechowski and the good reputation he enjoyed among fellow prisoners.

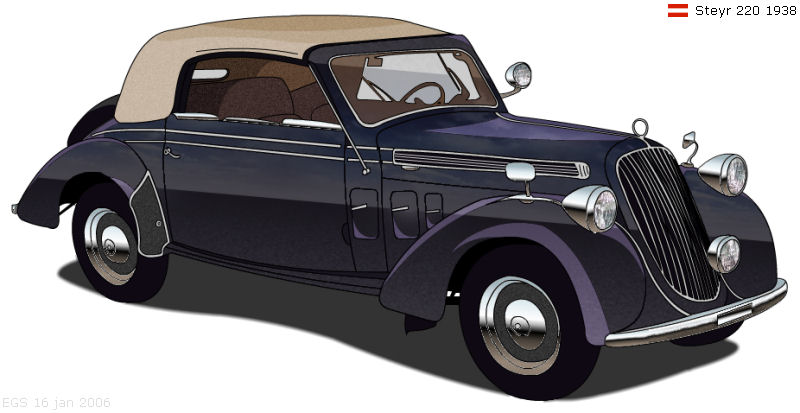
Steyr 220 cabriolet. This was the vehicle Jaster and his companions used to escape from Auschwitz

On the afternoon of 20 June 1942, (Note: Initially, the escape was scheduled for Saturday, 13 June 1942. However, the conspirators had to abandon their plans when they realized that SS officers were still working in the HWL warehouses' office that day (Czarnecka (2016, p. 90)).) the four conspirators, posing as members of the Rollwagenkommando, made their way near the HWL warehouses. Bendera opened the garage with a counterfeit key, while his companions entered the HWL basement through a previously loosened manhole cover into the coke bunker. Using forged keys, they opened the boiler room and office, and broke open the door to the armory with a crowbar they found in the basement. In the armory, they dressed in SS uniforms and took rifles, pistols, grenades, ammunition, and food. From the garage, they took an open-top Steyr 220, a car frequently used by the head of HWL, SS-Hauptsturmführer Kreutzmann (some sources, likely erroneously, claim that the vehicle belonged to the camp commandant). (Note: In Auschwitz, a rumor circulated that the escapees had sent an ironic letter to the camp commandant Rudolf Höss, in which they "apologized" for depriving him of his car. However, this is merely a legend. Kazimierz Piechowski firmly denied that such an event ever took place (Czarnecka (2014, p. 89); Foks (2012, p. 19)).) They then left the camp without any interference from the Germans and drove southeast. Near Maków Podhalański, the car broke down, forcing the escapees to abandon the vehicle and continue on foot. Soon after, the group split up. Upon leaving Auschwitz, Jaster took with him a report by Captain Pilecki. This was likely one of the reasons why, despite the high risk, he decided to return to his hometown of Warsaw.

It was one of the most daring escapes in the history of Auschwitz-Birkenau. It made a significant impression in the camp and had a positive effect on the prisoners' morale. Several wanted posters were issued for the escapees, which included their descriptions. The German authorities also offered a reward of 500,000 PLN for the capture of the escapees or information on their whereabouts. As a result of the investigation conducted by the camp authorities, the kapo from HWL, Reichsdeutsch Kurt Pachala (also known as Pachale), was sentenced to death in a starvation bunker. Kazimierz Piechowski, citing Alfons Kiprowski's account, claimed that seven SS officers and non-commissioned officers, who were held responsible for allowing the escape, were punished by being sent to the Eastern Front.

No collective reprisals were taken against the prisoners. However, the families of the escapees were punished. On 21 June, the Gestapo arrested Jaster's parents in Warsaw (both died in Auschwitz). (Note: Shortly before the escape, Jaster, like the other conspirators, sent his parents a letter with a disguised warning. However, they were unable to decipher its true message (Czarnecka (2014, p. 92)). After the arrest, the Jaster couple was detained at Pawiak. On 20 November 1942, Stanisław senior was deported to Auschwitz, where he died on 3 December of the same year (Czarnecka (2016, pp. 104–105)). Eugenia Jaster was transported in March 1943 to the Majdanek concentration camp. After a few months, she was transferred to Auschwitz, where she died of typhus on 26 July 1943 (Czarnecka (2016, pp. 125–127, 145)).) They also arrested Józef Lempart's mother (who died in Auschwitz) and Eugeniusz Bendera's wife (according to another source, his mother).

=== Fighting in the ranks of the Home Army ===
Initially, Jaster stayed with his friend, Anna Danuta Leśniewska, who lived in Komorów near Warsaw. He managed to find his younger brother, (Note: Andrzej Jaster, like his older brother, fought in the ranks of the Home Army. He was a member of the Żoliborz platoon in the group Andrzej (an operational unit of Kedyw of the Warsaw District of the Home Army – later known as Kolegium A). He adopted the codename Bekas. At the end of summer 1943, shortly after Stanisław's death, he was arrested while transporting weapons on a train to Lviv. After the investigation concluded, he was sent to the Gross-Rosen concentration camp, from which he was transferred to Flossenbürg concentration camp in February 1945. At the end of March of that year, he died of typhus in the Litoměřice subcamp (Czarnecka (2016, pp. 145–147)).) who had escaped arrest as he was outside the house during the Gestapo raid. The brothers lived in a rented apartment on Wilanowska Street in Warsaw's Solec district. They assumed false names: Stanisław Król and Andrzej Adamczewski. They earned a living as porters helping with moves. With the help of the Leśniewski family, Stanisław rented an additional apartment on Spacerowa Street in Komorów (he was already engaged to Anna Danuta at that time). However, he was constantly troubled by financial problems.

After returning to the capital, Jaster delivered a report from Captain Witold Pilecki to representatives of the Polish Underground State. He then became involved in underground activities. Initially, he was associated with the unit of Lieutenant Stanisław Janusz Sosabowski, codenamed Stasinek, but later he received an official assignment to the Organization of Special Combat Actions (Osa–Kosa 30), which was an elite and deeply covert operational unit of the Commander-in-Chief of the Home Army. He adopted the codename Hel (a reference to a light, low-density gas that "constantly dissipates"). He participated in many combat actions of the unit: among other things, he personally eliminated the German informant, lawyer Wojciech Wróblewski, directed an unsuccessful assassination attempt on the officer of the Warsaw Gestapo, Karol Schulz, (Note: The assassination was carried out in May 1943. It ended in failure, as Schulz was only injured (Czarnecka (2014, pp. 13, 99–101)).) and was involved in organizing a failed assassination of the starosta of Garwolin, Karl Freudenthal. Certain evidence suggests that alongside his service in the ranks of Osa–Kosa 30, he might also have had connections with the organization Wachlarz.

The Jaster brothers hoped to rescue their mother from the Germans. Due to his acquaintance with soldiers from the Grey Ranks, Józef Saski, codenamed Katoda, and Jan Rodowicz, codenamed Anoda, Stanisław took part in a "guest" operation to rescue prisoners near Celestynów (from 19 to 20 May 1943). During the attack on the German transport, he distinguished himself with exceptional courage and composure; contrary to his hopes, however, he did not find his mother among the freed prisoners.

Jaster was aware that by staying in Warsaw, as a person intensely sought by the Gestapo, he was taking great risks. To minimise the danger, he often tried to change his clothing and appearance (for example, he bleached his hair and used dental prosthetics). Being a blond man close to two meters tall, he successfully exploited his "Nordic appearance" to pass as a Gestapo agent in civilian clothes. Over time, he began using false documents issued to "SS-Unterscharführer, Josef Schmidt".

=== Death ===
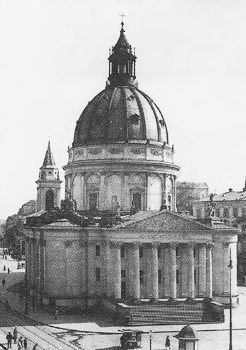
St. Alexander's Church in Warsaw (pre-war appearance), the site of the arrest of soldiers from the Osa–Kosa 30 unit

On 5 June 1943, the Gestapo unexpectedly surrounded St. Alexander's Church in Warsaw's Three Crosses Square, where the wedding of Lieutenant Mieczysław Uniejewski, codenamed Marynarz, an officer of Osa–Kosa 30, to Teofila Suchanek (daughter of Antoni Suchanek), the sister of a soldier from the same unit, was taking place. The Germans detained almost everyone in the church, including nearly 25 soldiers from the unit who, against all the principles of conspiracy, attended the ceremony. The newlyweds, along with the entire wedding party, were taken to Pawiak prison, where, after a quick selection, 56 detainees were held. Shortly afterward, incidents occurred indicating that the Gestapo's action was not coincidental. Leon Wanat, a Pawiak prisoner and chronicler, recalled that a few days later, some prisoners arrested at St. Alexander's Church were one by one led to the prison yard. At the same time, in the interrogation room, a man stood hidden behind the window frame. This individual, "of medium height, slim, with a dark complexion and dark hair", pointed out those involved in the conspiracy to the Germans. Most of the captured soldiers from Osa–Kosa 30 were soon executed. The remaining detainees were deported to concentration camps, or their fate remains unknown.

Although Hel had received an invitation, he did not attend the church. (Note: Jaster was also said to have advised his acquaintances against attending the ceremony, pointing out that such a gathering could be dangerous (Płatek (2011, pp. 8–9)).) Janusz Kwiatkowski, codenamed Zaruta, claimed that Jaster decided not to participate in the ceremony, considering the gathering too risky. Hanna Komierowska, the sister of one of the arrested soldiers, stated that in conversation, Jaster had mentioned that he missed the wedding because he had overslept. After the bust, the brothers immediately moved out of their apartment on Wilanowska Street, and shortly after, the Gestapo showed up there. Simultaneously, Jaster contacted Irena Klimesz, codenamed Bogna, a liaison officer for the intelligence unit of Osa–Kosa 30, requesting a meeting with the unit's chief of staff, Lieutenant Mieczysław Kudelski, codenamed Wiktor. He intended to ask for a transfer out of Warsaw, preferably to a partisan unit in the Eastern Borderlands.

Although the surviving soldiers were forbidden from contacting one another, Bogna relayed Jaster's request for a meeting, and Wiktor agreed. The meeting took place on 12 July 1943, around 6:00 PM, near the corner of Nowogrodzka and Krucza streets. At some point during the conversation between Wiktor and Hel, a German police car pulled up. Both soldiers were dragged into the vehicle, which immediately drove off towards the Gestapo headquarters at 25 Szuch Avenue. The event was allegedly witnessed by the adjutant to the Commander-in-Chief of the Home Army, Captain Ryszard Jamontt-Krzywicki, codenamed Szymon, who was supposed to meet Wiktor at that same time.

This is the last confirmed information about the fate of Stanisław Jaster. A few days after his arrest, his relatives received unofficial news that he had managed to escape from the Germans. However, soon after the war, rumours reached them that Hel had been killed by his fellow conspirators in one of the ruined buildings in Warsaw. The rumour that Jaster had been accused of treason and executed by the verdict of the Polish Underground was made more credible in the late 1960s in the memoirs of Home Army officers Aleksander Kunicki and Emil Kumor. However, these accounts do not provide details of the circumstances of his death. Moreover, no other sources confirm that the Home Army's counterintelligence conducted an investigation into Hel, nor that his case was brought before the Military Special Court. Józef Saski suspected that Jaster's extrajudicial execution was ordered by the aforementioned Captain Szymon, and the sentence was carried out by soldiers from his three-man protective team of the Commander-in-Chief of the Home Army, led by Jerzy Nowakowski, codenamed Jureczek.

However, this is not the only hypothesis about Hel's fate. A German report on the liquidation of the Wachlarz organization mentioned that Stanisław Jaster – an Auschwitz escapee who, after joining Wachlarz, organised the "assassinations of Reichsdeutsche, Volksdeutsche, and informants" – was arrested in Warsaw on 12 July 1943. Information about Jaster's arrest and an order to remove him from the wanted list also appears in the book of wanted persons issued on 30 September 1943 by the Gestapo in Poznań. In light of these documents, it is possible that Jaster was killed by the Germans shortly after his arrest. However, the available evidence does not allow for a definitive confirmation of this hypothesis.

== Controversies surrounding the alleged betrayal of Hel ==
In 1968, the Pax Publishing Institute released the memoirs of Aleksander Kunicki, codenamed Rayski, titled Cichy front. The author, who during the war served as the head of the intelligence unit of Osa–Kosa 30, dedicated an entire chapter to Jaster's case, titled Zdrajca (Traitor). In this chapter, Kunicki detailed the events surrounding the infiltration at St. Alexander's Church, as well as the investigation conducted by the Home Army's counterintelligence. Among the details in Kunicki's account was the claim that after the arrest of Wiktor, the role Hel played in the matter was scrutinised for the first time. The liaison Bogna testified that Jaster had shown significant interest in the leadership of the unit and its network of contact points.

The suspicions held by the counterintelligence against Jaster solidified when he unexpectedly returned to his comrades. He claimed that after his arrest, he had managed to jump out of the German car, sustaining a non-threatening gunshot wound to the leg in the process. However, medical examinations revealed that the bullet wound came from a 7 mm caliber weapon, while witnesses to the arrest claimed that the Germans were armed with 9 mm caliber submachine guns. Moreover, the wound was relatively shallow, not damaging the bone, and had been inflicted from such close range that powder burns were visible around its edge. Jaster was unable to provide a convincing explanation for these inconsistencies. Additionally, a witness reportedly came forward, claiming to have seen Jaster walking out of the Gestapo headquarters at Szuch Avenue on his own.

During interrogations, Jaster allegedly broke down and confessed to the betrayal. He was said to have revealed the wedding attendees to the Germans, identified those arrested at Pawiak, and later set a trap for Wiktor. He also supposedly confessed that his escape from Auschwitz had been staged by the Politische Abteilung to gain credibility in underground circles, while assuring that the other three escapees were unaware of his betrayal. Kunicki concluded: "The traitor and Gestapo informant Stanisław Jaster, codenamed Hel, was sentenced to death by the Home Army court. The sentence was carried out".

A year later, the Pax Publishing Institute published the memoirs of Lieutenant Colonel Emil Kumor, codenamed Krzyś, who had died in 1957. In these memoirs, Kumor, who was the head of the special division of the General Headquarters of the Home Army, included Captain Ryszard Jamontt-Krzywicki's account of the arrest of Wiktor and the investigation into Hel. This account confirmed the accusations made in Kunicki's memoirs, though the two accounts differed in certain details.

Kunicki's memoirs sparked a long and emotional debate. The accusations he raised caused significant upheaval among Hel's family, friends, and the veteran community. In 1971, Jerzy Ambroziewicz published a series of articles titled Zdrajca czy bohater? (Traitor or Hero?) in the magazine Za Wolność i Lud, aimed at defending Jaster's good name. Ambroziewicz pointed out that Hel did not match the description of the informant from Pawiak, as provided by Leon Wanat. Furthermore, no documents from the Special Military Court of the Home Army contained any records of an investigation into Jaster or a written verdict. He suggested that Jaster's accusers may have mistaken him for another Home Army soldier codenamed Hel, Karol Biskupski. Ambroziewicz also noted that Kunicki had likely never personally encountered Jaster, obtaining all information about him from third parties. Piotr Stachiewicz (veteran and chronicler of the Parasol Battalion) and one of the last living soldiers of Osa–Kosa 30, Stefan Smarzyński, codenamed Balon, came forward in support of Kunicki. In the article Żołnierz czy konfident? (Soldier or Informant?), published in Polityka in July 1971, they engaged in a polemic with Ambroziewicz and his supporters. They presented the following arguments, which they believed indicated Jaster's guilt:

- As many as four soldiers and underground collaborators – Emil Kumor, Józef Saski, codenamed Katoda, Henryk Kozłowski, codenamed Kmita, and lawyer Zbigniew Witkowski – received information from Captain Szymon that Hel was a traitor and that his guilt had been indisputably proven during the investigation.
- Hanna Komierowska, the sister of one of the soldiers arrested in the church, claimed that on the day of the infiltration, she visited Jaster at his apartment on Wilanowska Street to inform him of his comrades' arrest. Hel was reportedly very uneasy about her visit and gave an unconvincing explanation that he had missed the ceremony because he overslept (the wedding took place at 12:00 PM).
- Jaster's behavior after the infiltration at St. Alexander's Church was puzzling. Unlike other soldiers, who contacted their immediate superior, Second Lieutenant Jerzy Kleczkowski, codenamed Ryś, within 2 or 3 days (e.g., through a contact drop at M. Mroczek's diner on 58 Chmielna Street), Jaster did not. Instead, he made great efforts to establish contact with Lieutenant Wiktor, a key member of the unit's staff.
- Due to the passage of time and the conditions at Pawiak, Leon Wanat's description of the informant should not be taken uncritically. Additionally, one of the arrested soldiers, Andrzej Komierowski, codenamed Andrzej, managed to smuggle out a note before his death, stating that the informant identifying conspirators was in a side room, hidden behind doors made of frosted glass, making identification impossible. The note also suggested that the informant was not among those arrested at the ceremony and was well-acquainted with those detained.
- Stefania Sokal, the sister of the unit staff's liaison officer, Aleksandra Sokal, codenamed Władka, claimed that around 8 June, Hel, under orders from Lieutenant Ludwik Berger, removed the unit's archive from the sisters' apartment at 39/41 Czarniecki Street. Meanwhile, Maria Szatkowska, arrested a few days later, claimed that during her interrogation at the Gestapo headquarters, she was shown photographs of the unit's soldiers taken from that very archive (the photographs were used to forge false documents). The fact that these photos were in German possession was also mentioned in Andrzej's note. Hel was obligated to immediately report the loss of the unit's archive, but there is no evidence that he did so. Stachiewicz and Smarzyński considered these facts to weigh heavily against Jaster.
- A several-page report from SS-Hauptscharführer Folta, a member of a special unit of the security police led by SS-Hauptsturmführer Alfred Spilker, has been preserved. It primarily concerns the investigation into the failed assassination attempt on the Higher SS and Police Leader in the General Government, SS-Obergruppenführer Friedrich-Wilhelm Krüger. According to the report, the arrest of Osa–Kosa 30 soldiers was made possible in part by informants connected to the Warsaw team of that unit. Moreover, the report indicates that it was this informant who identified the arrested unit members at Pawiak.
- The absence of investigation records and a written verdict in the documents of the Home Army's Special Military Court does not indicate Hel's innocence. According to the Commander-in-Chief's Order No. 24/804/1 of 11 May 1943, Colonel August Emil Fieldorf, codenamed Nil, the commander of the Diversion Directorate, was authorised to issue and execute death sentences unilaterally for individuals who posed a direct threat to Kedyw.
- Testimonies in Jaster's favor were given by people related to him or closely associated with him.

In the debate that continued throughout 1971, veterans, historians, former Auschwitz prisoners, and Jaster's relatives and friends voiced their opinions. The latter group issued numerous letters and statements in his defense, addressed to the press, publishing houses, veteran organizations, and the Auschwitz-Birkenau State Museum. Among those who spoke were two of his fellow escapees from Auschwitz, Józef Lempart and Kazimierz Piechowski, as well as Alfons Kiprowski, a would-be escapee, all of whom categorically denied that the escape could have been staged by the Germans. Leon Wanat sent a letter to the weekly Polityka, in which he affirmed that he was certain he had accurately remembered the informant's appearance. Articles about Jaster's case also appeared in the Polish émigré press. Tomasz Strzembosz, in his review of Cichy front, addressed the case of Hel, pointing out inconsistencies and contradictions in Kunicki's argument and the differences between his account and the recollections of Emil Kumor. In conclusion, he assessed: "The evidence upon which Kunicki bases his claim that Jaster was a traitor is, in my opinion, unconvincing and insufficient... This particularly difficult and unpleasant matter requires further detailed and careful analysis. The authoritative statements of the author of Cichy front should perhaps not be the final word on this issue". (Note: In his monograph Oddziały szturmowe konspiracyjnej Warszawy 1939–1944, Strzembosz assessed that the thesis of Jaster's betrayal, "though it has certain elements of probability", was not supported by convincing arguments. He also noted that "a large part of the blame for the tragedy of the Kosa soldiers can be attributed to its leadership, which failed to prevent the mass participation of unit members in the wedding ceremony, as well as to the counterintelligence unit, which did not uncover the informant" (Strzembosz (1983, p. 213)).)

In response to the mounting criticism, Kunicki was forced to admit that he had not directly participated in the investigation of Jaster and that his information on the matter came from Captain Krzywicki, codenamed Szymon, through third parties, including Emil Kumor (who had also received this information from Szymon via a third party, the artist Łukasz Powoski). However, he did not change his stance regarding the alleged betrayal by Hel. Despite the numerous counterarguments presented publicly, the accusations made by Kunicki and Kumor, supported by Smarzyński and Stachiewicz, continued to be repeated in later historical, memoir, and press publications (including in the memoirs of the commander of the Zagra-Lin unit, Bernard Drzyzga). Nevertheless, doubts raised during the debate were reflected in some historical and memoir works dedicated to the period of German occupation.

After a hiatus of several years, the discussion was revived by Adam Cyra, a senior curator at the Auschwitz-Birkenau State Museum, who analyzed German documents and numerous statements that had been submitted to the museum following the publication of Cichy front. Based on this, Cyra published two articles in the weeklies Kierunki (1986) and Panorama (1987), where he presented several pieces of evidence defending Jaster and called for his rehabilitation. In 1991, an article titled Dramat Stanisława Gustawa Jastera codenamed "Hel" by Janusz Kwiatkowski and Wiesław Raciborski was published in Polska Zbrojna, in which they once again presented testimonies pointing to Jaster's innocence and highlighted numerous gaps and inconsistencies in the arguments of his accusers. Kwiatkowski and Raciborski also appealed to the authorities of the World Association of Home Army Soldiers to conduct a thorough re-examination of the case and to officially rehabilitate Jaster.

The debate was reignited at the start of the second decade of the 21st century. In 2011, Duży Format, a supplement to Gazeta Wyborcza, published an article by Piotr Płatek titled Obrona "Hela", which again presented evidence suggesting Jaster's innocence. Historian Daria Czarnecka also examined the case, publishing her findings in two books: Sprawa Stanisława Gustawa Jastera ps. "Hel" w historiografii. Kreacja obrazu zdrajcy i obrona (2014) and Największa zagadka Polskiego Państwa Podziemnego. Stanisław Gustaw Jaster – człowiek, który zniknął (2016). Czarnecka accessed many archival documents, including German records, that had not been previously analyzed in this context. This allowed her to point out contradictions in earlier accounts and propose new hypotheses regarding Jaster's fate. In her conclusion, Czarnecka asserted that "there is no strong evidence of Staszek's guilt, and much speaks in his favor", adding that, unless new documents are found, "this case can be considered closed". She also believed that Jaster "fell victim to an underground mistake".

However, Hubert Kuberski disagrees, emphasizing that due to the deaths of key witnesses and the lack of definitive documentary evidence (owing to the destruction of the Warsaw Gestapo archives in August 1944 and insufficient research in German archives), Czarnecka's conclusions can only be considered "weak clues", and a definitive resolution to the question of Jaster's alleged betrayal remains impossible.

Throughout the years of debate, proponents of Jaster's innocence presented the following arguments in his defense:

- All the materials that Aleksander Kunicki and Emil Kumor used to accuse Hel came from third parties, with the original source being just one person – Captain Ryszard Jamontt-Krzywicki, codenamed Szymon. This officer died in February 1957, less than a year after his release from Stalinist prison, and left no written memoirs. In 1957, Kunicki, while corresponding with Józef Saski, spoke highly of Jaster.
- The accusers failed to present convincing motives for Jaster's alleged betrayal.
- Jaster was a member of the underground resistance at Auschwitz. There is no indication that his alleged betrayal had any repercussions for the camp's resistance movement. He also did not reveal his fellow escapees to the Germans, despite having numerous opportunities to do so.
- Jaster was added to the group of Auschwitz escapees at the last moment, making it unlikely that the escape was staged by the camp Gestapo. Moreover, German documents indicate that an intense search for the escapees was conducted, and the Gestapo continued to place significant importance on capturing them. (Note: The names of all four escapees were included in the list of wanted persons in the General Government (Fahndungsnachweis für das Generalgouvernement), and Jaster's name was additionally listed in the wanted book issued by the Kriminalpolizei (Fahndungsbuch herausgegeben von Reichskriminalpolizeiamt im Berlin). Information about the wanted individuals was even sent to Gestapo offices in Łódź and Linz (Czarnecka (2014, pp. 92–93, 107–108)).)
- A concentration camp prisoner was essentially the "property" of the police organ that sent them to the camp. To recruit Jaster as an informant and fake his escape from Auschwitz, the head of the security police and security service in Warsaw, SS-Obersturmbannführer Ludwig Hahn, would have had to approve it. The lack of preserved German documents, due to their destruction during the Warsaw Uprising, prevents confirmation of the allegation that Jaster was an informant.
- If Jaster had been a Gestapo informant, the Germans would not have described him as "wanted" in their internal documentation. After his arrest, they would not have referred to him as someone who was arrested, nor would they have canceled the warrants issued for him.
- Shortly after Jaster's escape from the camp, his parents were arrested and later died in Auschwitz. It seems unlikely that the Germans would have treated them this way if Hel had been their agent.
- Hel's connections within the Warsaw underground were extensive, reaching beyond his primary unit, as evidenced by his participation in the Celestynów action. It seems improbable that the Germans would have used such a valuable informant solely to dismantle Osa–Kosa 30. Additionally, there is no evidence that Hel's alleged betrayal led to arrests in other units of the Home Army.
- The Germans arranged Wiktor's arrest in a way that cast suspicion on Hel. It is doubtful they would have done so if he had been a valuable informant within the Polish Underground.
- Jaster did not match the description of the informant from Pawiak, as provided by Leon Wanat. Furthermore, in response to Stachiewicz and Smarzyński's 1971 article, Wanat wrote to Polityka, stating that he was certain he had accurately remembered the appearance of the informant. He also questioned the information from Andrzej Komierowski's note cited by the authors, pointing out inaccuracies, such as the claim that there was a room with glass doors in Pawiak, which was false.
- In September 1971, Stefania Sokal stated that the Osa–Kosa 30 archives, which she handed over to Hel shortly after the exposure at St. Alexander's Church, did not contain any photographs.
- Janusz Kwiatkowski, codenamed Zaruta, a Home Army soldier and acquaintance of Hel, claimed to have been an eyewitness to his escape from a Gestapo car.
- The records of the Home Army's Military Special Court do not contain the files from the investigation into Jaster, nor a written verdict. The search only uncovered documents related to the trial of another Home Army soldier with the codename Hel – Karol Biskupski from the Baszta regiment. Furthermore, in the autumn of 1970, Bernard Zakrzewski, codenamed Oskar (head of the Security and Counterintelligence Department of Section II of the Home Army Headquarters), and Stanisław Leszczyński, codenamed Vigil (head of Referat 998 in Section II of the Home Army Headquarters), issued statements declaring that their respective cells had not conducted any investigation into Jaster, nor were they aware of any such investigation within other structures of the Home Army.
- In the summer of 1943, as a result of informants Ludwik Kalkstein, Blanka Kaczorowska, and Eugeniusz Świerczewski, (Note: Janusz Kwiatkowski, codenamed Zaruta, was convinced that it was precisely these informants who were responsible for the dismantling of Osa–Kosa 30 (Czarnecka (2014, p. 44)).) the German security apparatus dealt a series of painful blows to the Polish Underground State, culminating in the arrest of Home Army Commander-in-Chief General Stefan Rowecki, codenamed Grot, on 30 June 1943. In the atmosphere of "spy mania" that engulfed the Home Army structures at the time, Hel could easily have fallen victim to false accusations and a lynching.
- The fact that Hel's wound was inflicted from close range and with a small-caliber pistol should not raise suspicion, considering that the struggle leading to his escape allegedly took place in a cramped car.
- If "being cornered", as Kumor mentioned in his book, meant physical torture, it is unsurprising that Jaster might have confessed to acts he did not commit.
- The fact that Jaster allegedly left the Gestapo headquarters at Szuch Avenue under his own power is potentially the most important evidence of his guilt. However, no details are known about this event, not even the identity of the witness who supposedly identified him.
- Stanisław Jaster may have been confused with Teodor Jaster, who escaped from the Łódź prison in Radogoszcz and was later tried as a suspected German informant.

Jaster's case remained one of the most mysterious and controversial episodes in the history of the Polish Underground State and the Auschwitz-Birkenau camp.

On 25 September 2019, President Andrzej Duda posthumously awarded Stanisław Jaster the Knight's Cross of the Order of Polonia Restituta. This gesture has been interpreted as his symbolic rehabilitation.

== Commemoration ==
Stanisław Gustaw Jaster, along with his parents and his brother Andrzej, have been commemorated with symbolic inscriptions on the family tomb at the Evangelical–Augsburg Cemetery in Warsaw.

The fate of Stanisław Gustaw Jaster, codenamed Hel, is the subject of the documentary Jaster. Tajemnica Hela, directed by Marek Tomasz Pawłowski and Małgorzata Walczak, which premiered on 13 September 2014.

== Bibliography ==
- Cyra, Adam (12 October 1986). "Tragiczna pomyłka" [Tragic Mistake]. Kierunki. Tygodnik społeczno-kulturalny katolików (in Polish). 41 (1566).
- Cyra, Adam (25 January 1987). "Uciekinier" [Fugitive]. Panorama. Śląski Tygodnik Ilustrowany (in Polish). 4 (1696).
- Czarnecka, Daria (2016). Największa zagadka Polskiego Państwa Podziemnego. Stanisław Gustaw Jaster – człowiek, który zniknął [The Greatest Mystery of the Polish Underground State. Stanisław Gustaw Jaster – The Man Who Disappeared] (in Polish). Warsaw: Wydawnictwo Naukowe PWN. ISBN 978-83-01-18809-2.
- Czarnecka, Daria (2014). Sprawa Stanisława Gustawa Jastera ps. "Hel" w historiografii. Kreacja obrazu zdrajcy i obrona [The Case of Stanisław Gustaw Jaster "Hel" in Historiography. The Creation of the Traitor Image and His Defense] (in Polish). Warsaw: Instytut Pamięci Narodowej. ISBN 978-83-7629-721-7.
- Foks, Maciej (2012). "Uciec przeznaczeniu – z Kazimierzem Piechowskim, więźniem numer 918, uciekinierem z niemieckiego obozu koncentracyjnego Auschwitz, rozmawia Maciej Foks" [Escaping Fate – Maciej Foks in conversation with Kazimierz Piechowski, prisoner number 918, fugitive from the German concentration camp Auschwitz]. Pamięć.pl (in Polish). 6. ISSN 2084-7319. Archived from the original on 2015-04-21.
- Kumor, Emil (1969). Wycinek z historii jednego życia [A snippet from the history of one life] (in Polish). Warsaw: Instytut Wydawniczy PAX.
- Kunicki, Aleksander (1969). Cichy front [The silent front] (in Polish). Warsaw: Instytut Wydawniczy PAX.
- Płatek, Piotr (10 March 2011). "Obrona "Hela"" [Defense of "Hel"]. Duży Format (in Polish). 9.
- Smarzyński, Stefan; Stachiewicz, Piotr (24 July 1971). "Żołnierz czy konfident?" [Soldier or informant?]. Polityka (in Polish). 30 (751).
- Strzembosz, Tomasz (1983). Oddziały szturmowe konspiracyjnej Warszawy 1939–1944 [Assault units of underground Warsaw 1939–1944] (in Polish). Warsaw: Państwowe Wydawnictwo Naukowe. ISBN 83-01-04203-6.
