= Sławomir Poleszak =

Polish historian (born 1969)

- Born: 1969 (age 56–57)
- Citizenship: Polish
- Occupation: Historian

Academic background
- Education: John Paul II Catholic University of Lublin
- Doctoral advisor: Tomasz Strzembosz

Sławomir Poleszak (born 1969) is a Polish historian, employed by Institute of National Remembrance since 2000, who is an expert on cursed soldiers. Poleszak is the editor-in-chief of ohistorie.eu portal.

== Biography ==
In 1996 he graduated in history from the Catholic University of Lublin. He obtained doctorate in 2002 upon dissertation supervised by Tomasz Strzembosz. In 2020 his article on Józef Franczak's World War II activity appeared in Zagłada Żydów. Studia i Materiały.

== Books ==
- Jan Tabortowski „Bruzda” 1906–1954. Warszawa. 2012. ISBN 9788373994928.
- Niezłomni czy realiści? Polskie podziemie antykomunistyczne bez patosu. Kraków. 2024. ISBN 9788308084229. Co-authored with Rafał Wnuk.

=== Editions ===
- Podziemie zbrojne na Lubelszczyźnie wobec dwóch totalitaryzmów 1939–1956. Warszawa. 2002. ISBN 8391598349. Co-edited with Adam Puławski.
- Polskie podziemie niepodległościowe na tle konspiracji antykomunistycznych w Europie Środkowo-Wschodniej w latach 1944–1956. Warszawa-Lublin. 2008. ISBN 9788360464816.
- „Zaplute karły reakcji...”: polskie podziemie niepodległościowe 1944–1956. Lublin. 2013. ISBN 9788376295800. Co-edited with Agnieszka Jaczyńska, Magdalena Śladecka and Rafał Wnuk.

== Accolades ==
He was decorated with Knight's Cross of the Order of Polonia Restituta by President Andrzej Duda.
