= Operation Góral =

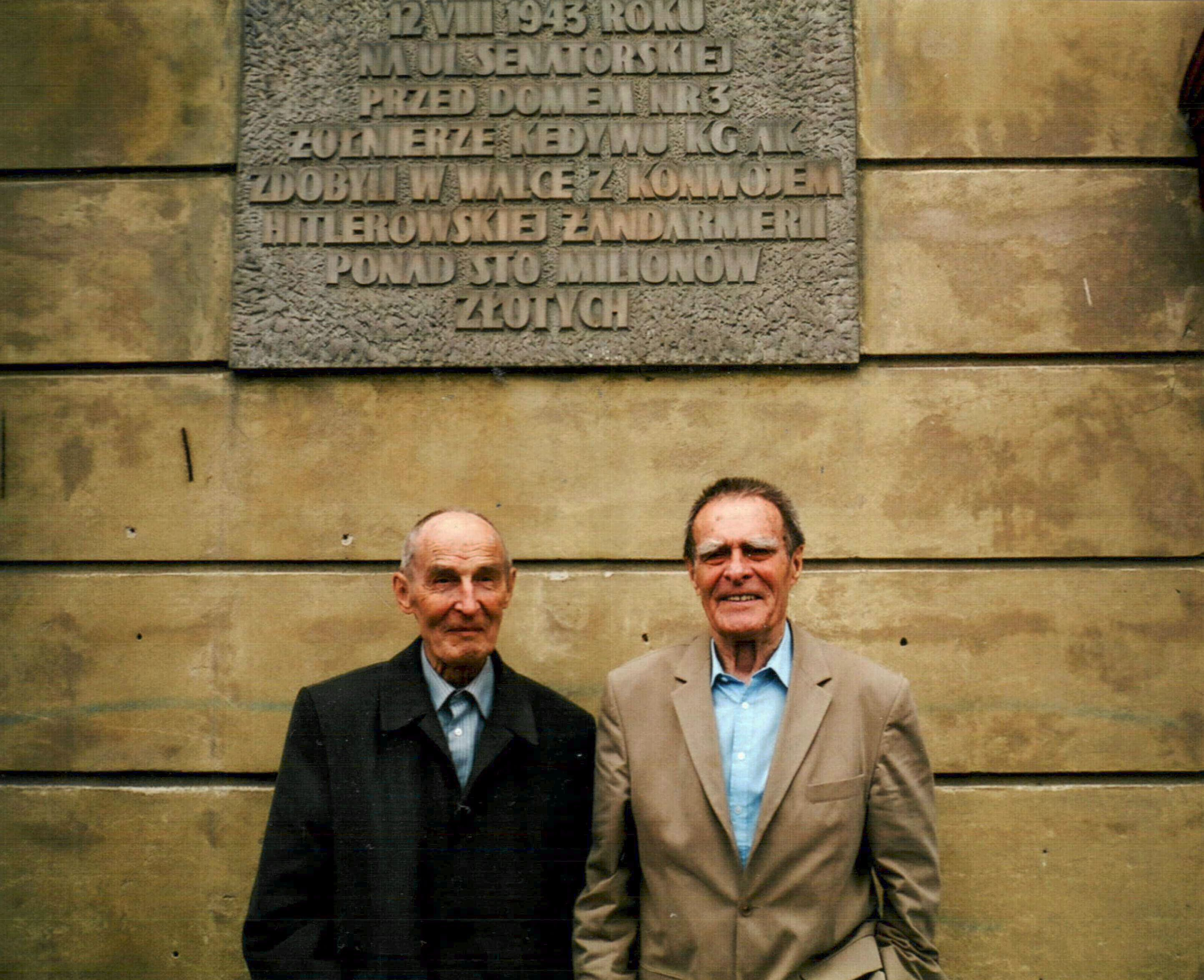
Two surviving members of the Polish resistance group who took part in the heist, at a plaque commemorating this event

Operation Góral (Polish: Akcja Góral) was an action carried out by the Polish anti-Nazi resistance organization Home Army (Armia Krajowa, or "AK"), which involved a heist of over a million US dollars' worth of currency being transported by Nazi German authorities on 12 August 1943. It was carried out in the center of Warsaw by a unit of Kedyw, "Motor", which seized a transport car carrying the money. It was one of the best organized actions of the Polish underground during the German occupation, and it took only two minutes.

The name of the action comes from the "Góral", the popular name for the 500 zloty note (which were also known as "Młynarki"). Polish historian Tomasz Strzembosz called this operation one of the most successful resistance operations in occupied Europe.

== History ==
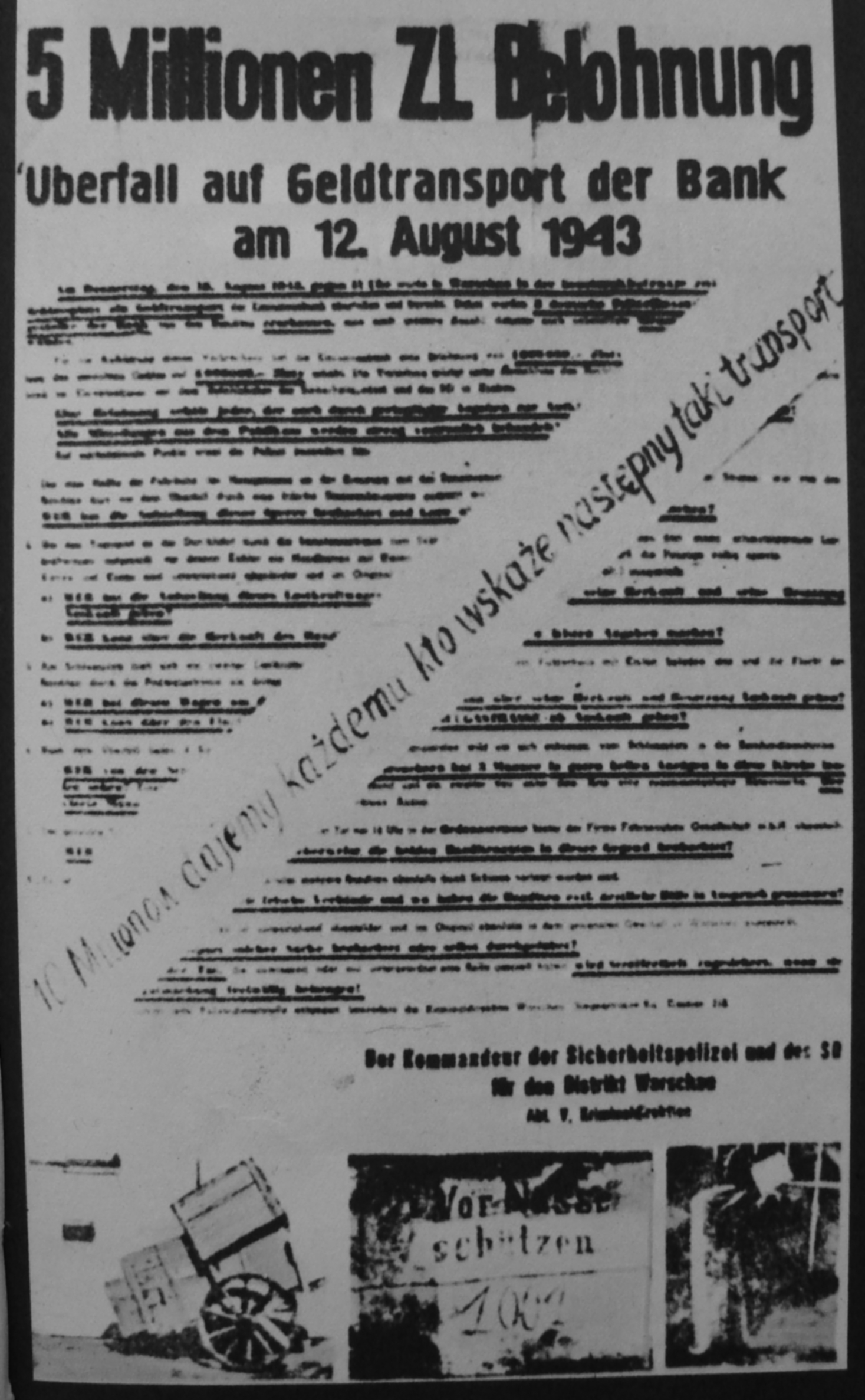
German bounty poster offering 5 million zloties for information about the perpetrators, defaced by Polish resistance with a note offering 10 million for information about potential robbery targets.

Following the German invasion and occupation of Poland in 1939, a large resistance network was formed. That resistance required funds to operate, and the resources of the Polish government in exile, delivered through the cichociemni commando-couriers, were limited. In 1942 the resistance began planning to acquire money from the occupiers by carrying out large-scale robberies. Having learned that a large quantity of money would be moved by the occupiers to the German-established Bank of Issue in Poland, the resistance recruited a number of sympathizers within the bank. Preparations lasted about 14 months.

A cell, codenamed "Motor 30" from the Kedyw formation, led by operative "Pol", was assigned to the operation. The plan was to block the road at a specified location, shoot the German personnel attempting to clear it, and carry away the money. The action was initially planned for August 5, but a miscommunication resulted in the operation not being carried out. Fortunately for the insurgents, a new delivery was planned for the following week. The plan was carried out successfully, with the truck redirected into a small alley, all German personnel, including an escorting vehicle, quickly eliminated (according to one report, the Germans suffered nine fatalities and seven wounded; according to another, six killed and six wounded; only one of the Polish insurgents was wounded;), and the truck captured. Approximately 50 Polish insurgents took part in the operation, which lasted only about two minutes.

The Polish insurgents obtained about 105–106 million zlotys and a smaller amount of German currency, estimated to be worth about one million 1943 US dollars (approximately twenty million of 2010's US dollars). German investigation efforts, despite a large bounty for informants, failed to produce results, and the Germans were even not sure who had carried out the operations – the insurgents or regular criminals, which led to no reprisals against the civilian population (an otherwise-common tactic used by the Germans to discourage resistance operations).

AK carried out similar operations on other occasions, for example on 1 June 1943 in Siedlce, though they obtained less money.

== See also ==
- Bezdany raid
