= St. Alexander's Church, Warsaw =

St. Alexander's Church
- kościół św. Aleksandra
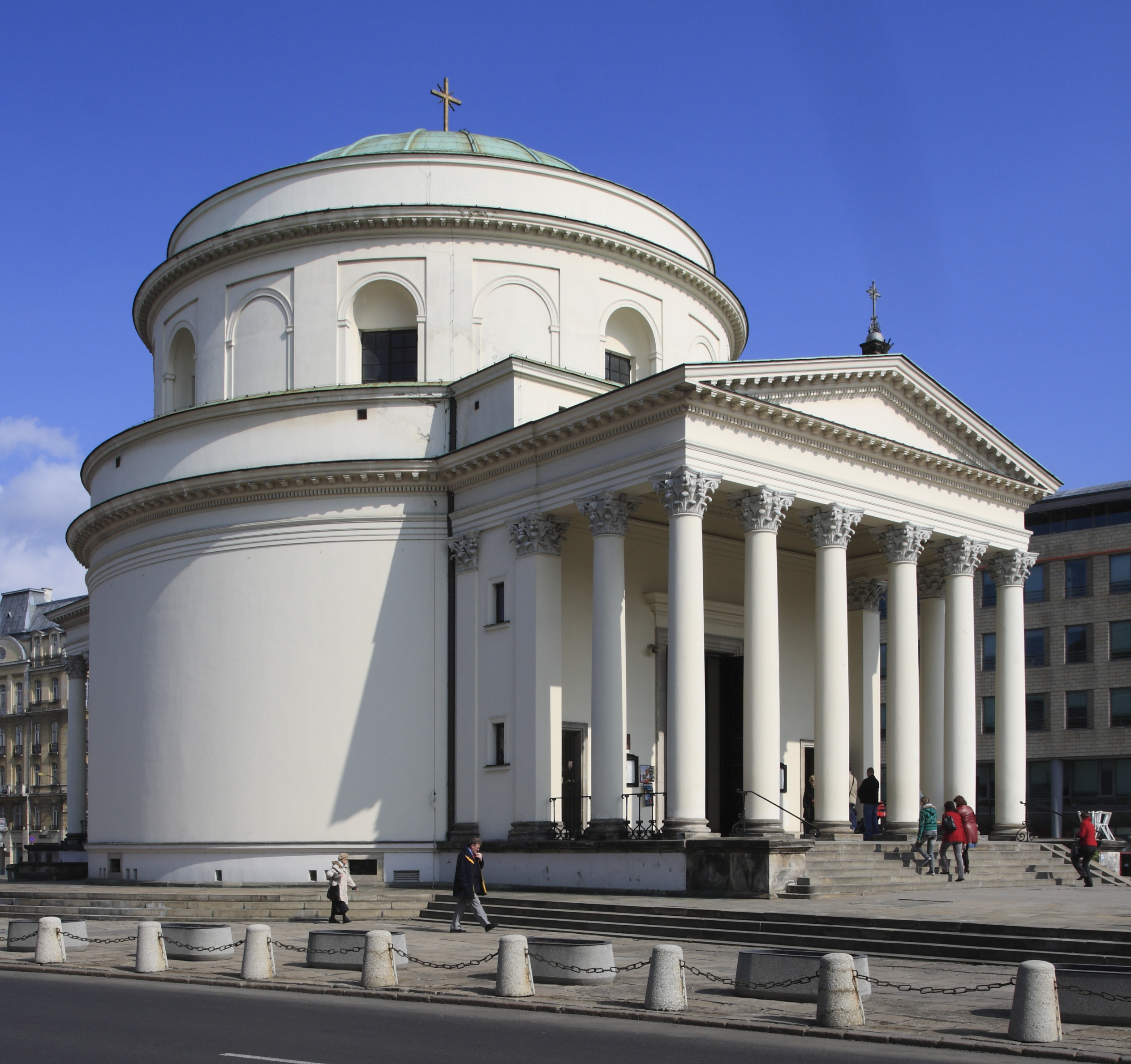
- The church on Triple Cross Square
- St. Alexander's Church
- 52°13′44″N 21°1′20″E
- Location: Warsaw
- Country: Poland
- Denomination: Roman Catholic

History
- Status: Church
- Consecrated: 18 June 1826

Architecture
- Functional status: Active
- Architect: Chrystian Piotr Aigner
- Architectural type: Church
- Style: Neoclassical
- Groundbreaking: 15 June 1818
- Completed: 1825
- Demolished: 1944 rebuilt 1949–52

St. Alexander's Church (Polish: kościół św. Aleksandra) is a Roman Catholic church located on Triple Cross Square in central Warsaw, Poland. It is near the south end of New World Street (Nowy Świat), the Royal Route, and Warsaw's Old Town. The church is one of Warsaw's most recognizable landmarks.

St. Alexander's Church was designed in neoclassical style by renowned Polish architect Chrystian Piotr Aigner and was built in 1818–1825. In the late 19th century, St. Alexander's was remodeled into a larger, more grandiose Neo-Renaissance church with two side towers and a higher, ornate dome. It was destroyed in World War II and reconstructed in its initial, simpler form in 1949-52.

== History ==
The church was established by grateful Varsovians to commemorate Tsar Alexander I of Russia, who had conferred a constitution on the autonomous Congress Kingdom of Poland after the country's 18th-century partitions.

The church was designed by Chrystian Piotr Aigner on a circular plan surmounted by a dome, in Neoclassical style, between 1818 and 1825. The inspiration for the design was the Pantheon in Rome. The foundation stone was laid on 15 June 1818 by Treasury Minister Jan Węgliński, standing in for an indisposed General Józef Zajączek, Namestnik of the Kingdom of Poland. The church was consecrated on 18 June 1826 by Primate Wojciech Skarszewski. The main altar was adorned with an oil painting of The Crucifixion of Jesus by Franciszek Smuglewicz.

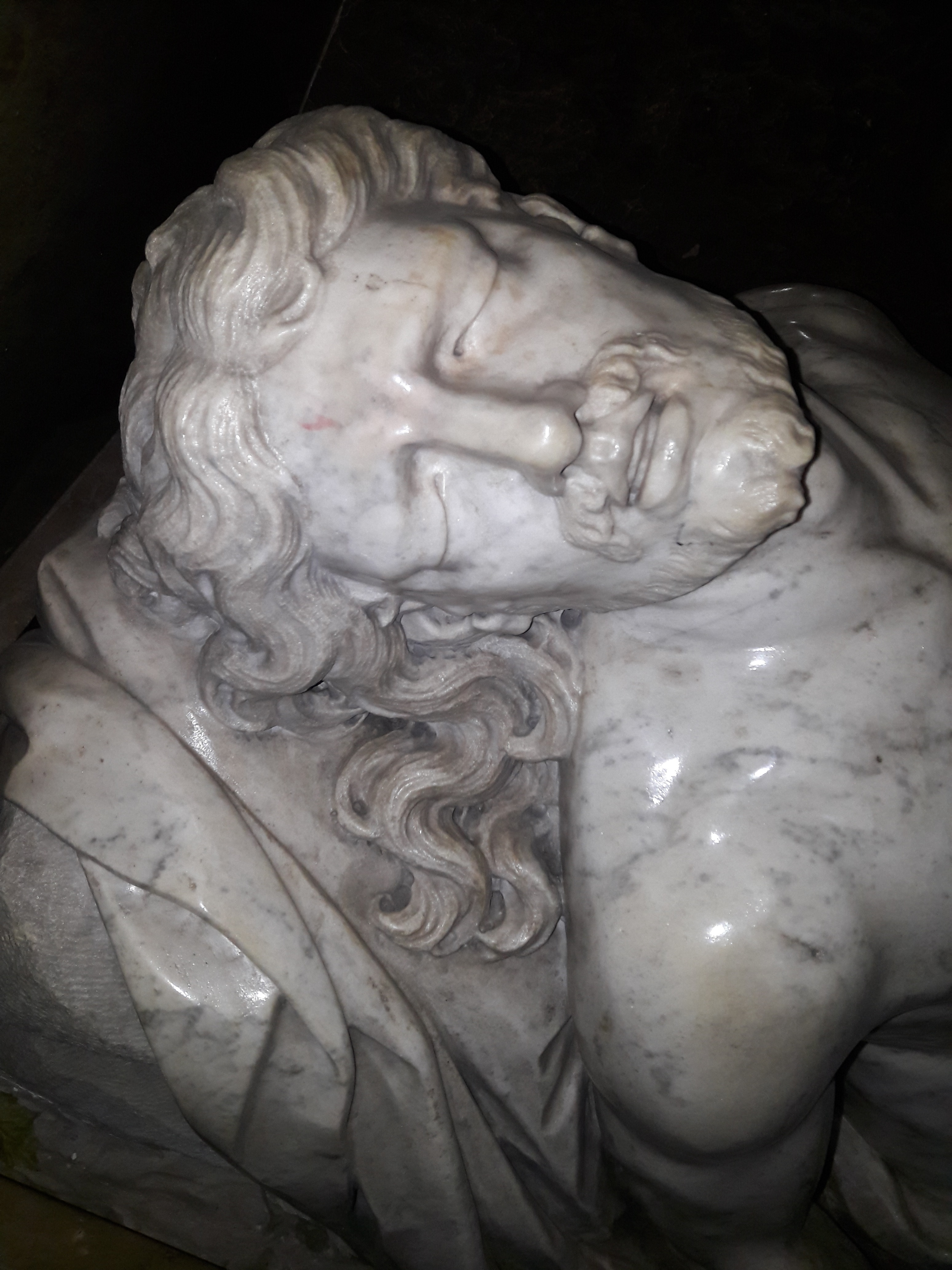
Fragment of statue of dead Christ by a Roman or Florentine sculptor in left side altar

From 1886 to 1895, the church was rebuilt in Neo-Renaissance style, resulting in a much larger building with two prominent towers and a large peaked dome. The contest for the reconstruction design, announced on 14 April 1883, was won by Józef Pius Dziekoński. The original rotunda was enlarged by adding three naves on the Ujazdowskie Avenue side and two towers, and increasing the height of the dome. The southern portico was embellished with a relief of Christ Blessing the Poor and Crippled by Jan Kryński and sculptures by Teofil Gosecki. With these changes, the building became one of Warsaw's largest.

During its existence the church has witnessed a number of historic events, including the 1912 funeral service for Bolesław Prus, who died a couple of blocks away in his apartment on ulica Wilcza (Wolf Street).

The church was destroyed in World War II, during the Warsaw Uprising. During the German Luftwaffe's bombing in the first days of September 1944, the church was hit by 9 bombs, collapsing the dome, main nave, and one of the towers. After the war it was debated whether to rebuild it to its prewar grandeur or to its original appearance before reconstruction. The church was rebuilt between 1949 and 1952 in a form similar to its original simpler design.

The 17th-century white marble statue of dead Christ by a Roman or Florentine sculptor to the left of the altar was acquired in Rome by Stanisław Herakliusz Lubomirski between 1674 and 1694, and was transferred to St. Alexander's Church in 1826.

== Gallery ==
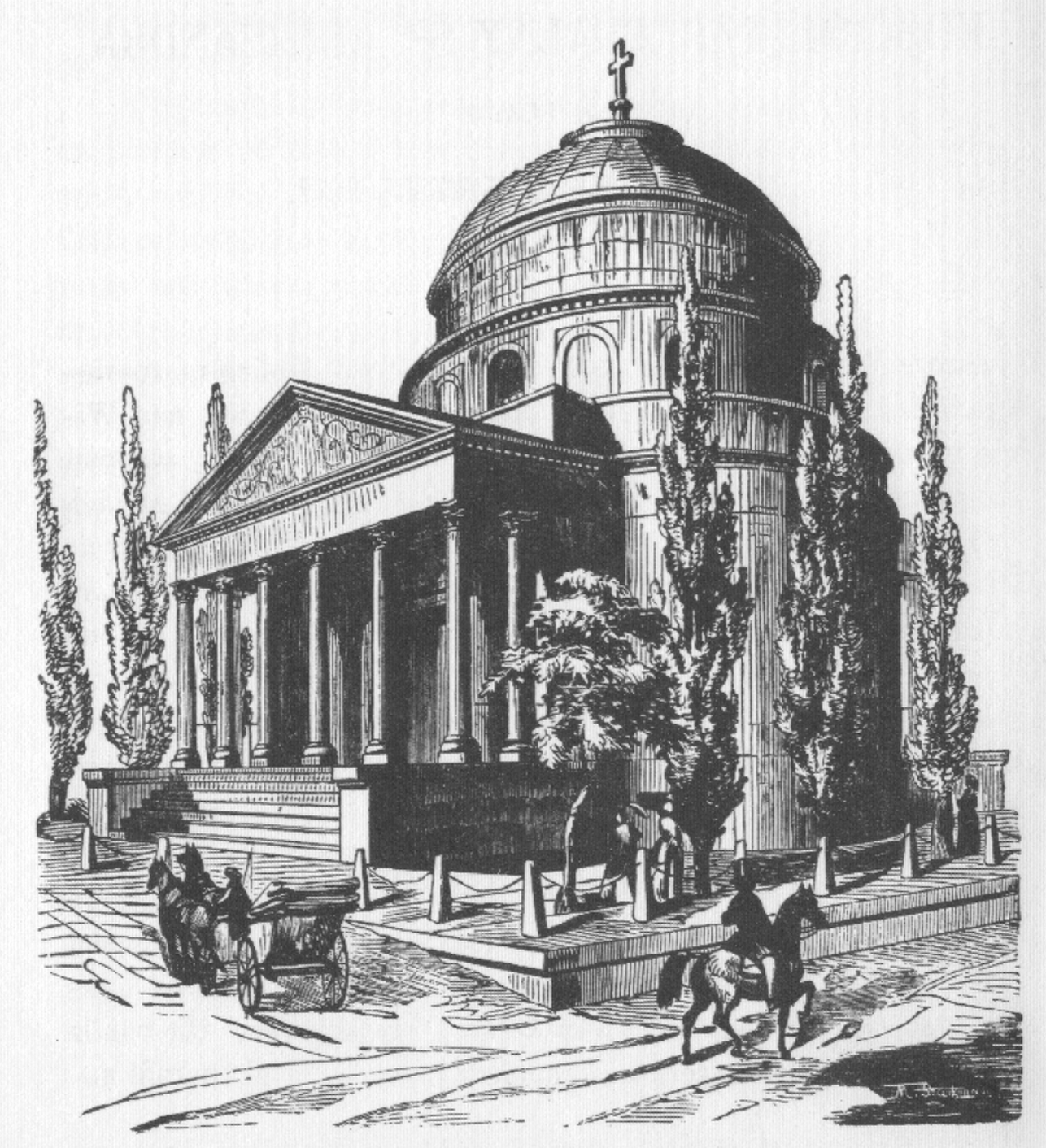
Original design of the church, c. 1855

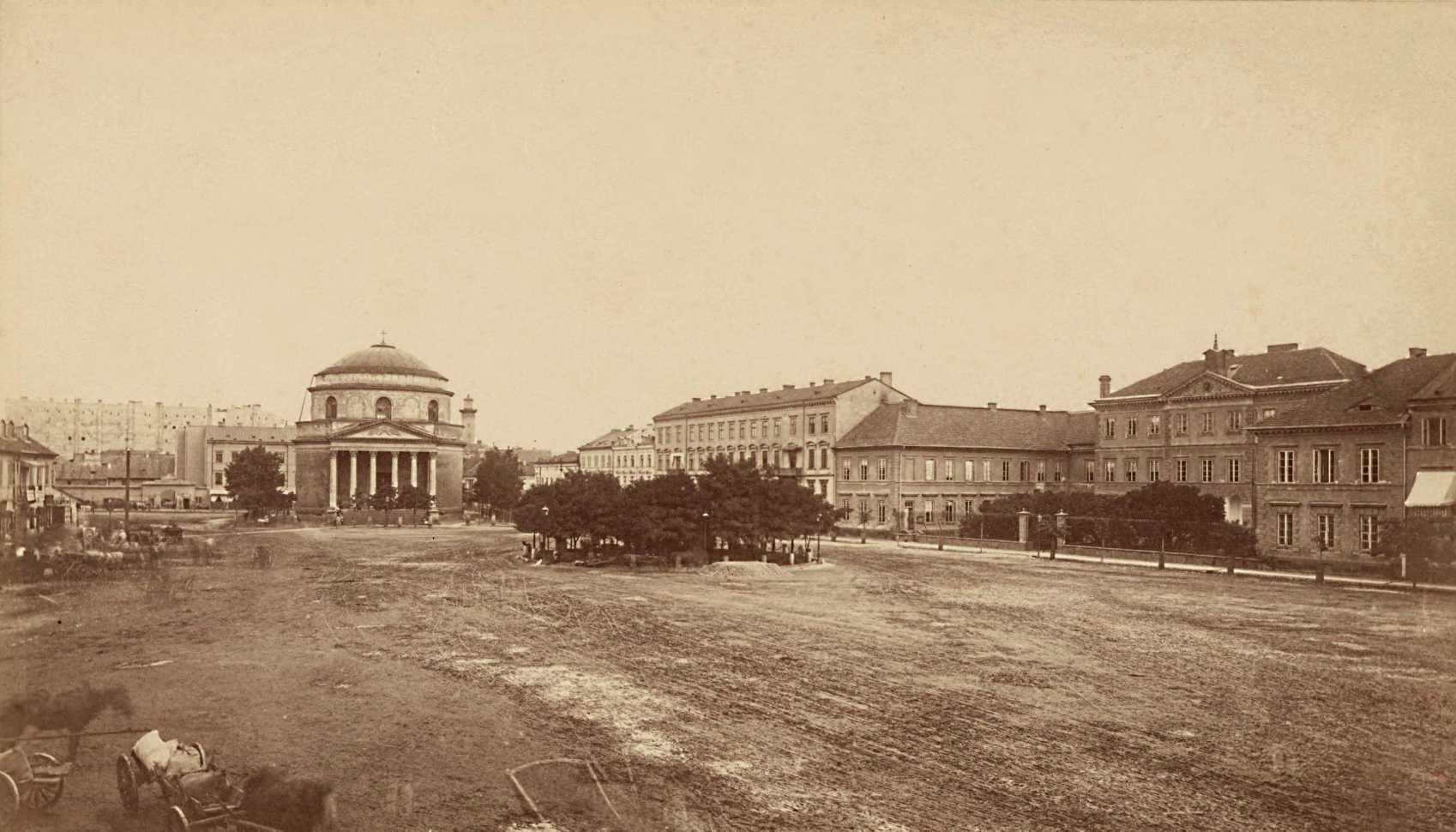
Triple Cross Square, with the church, 1880s

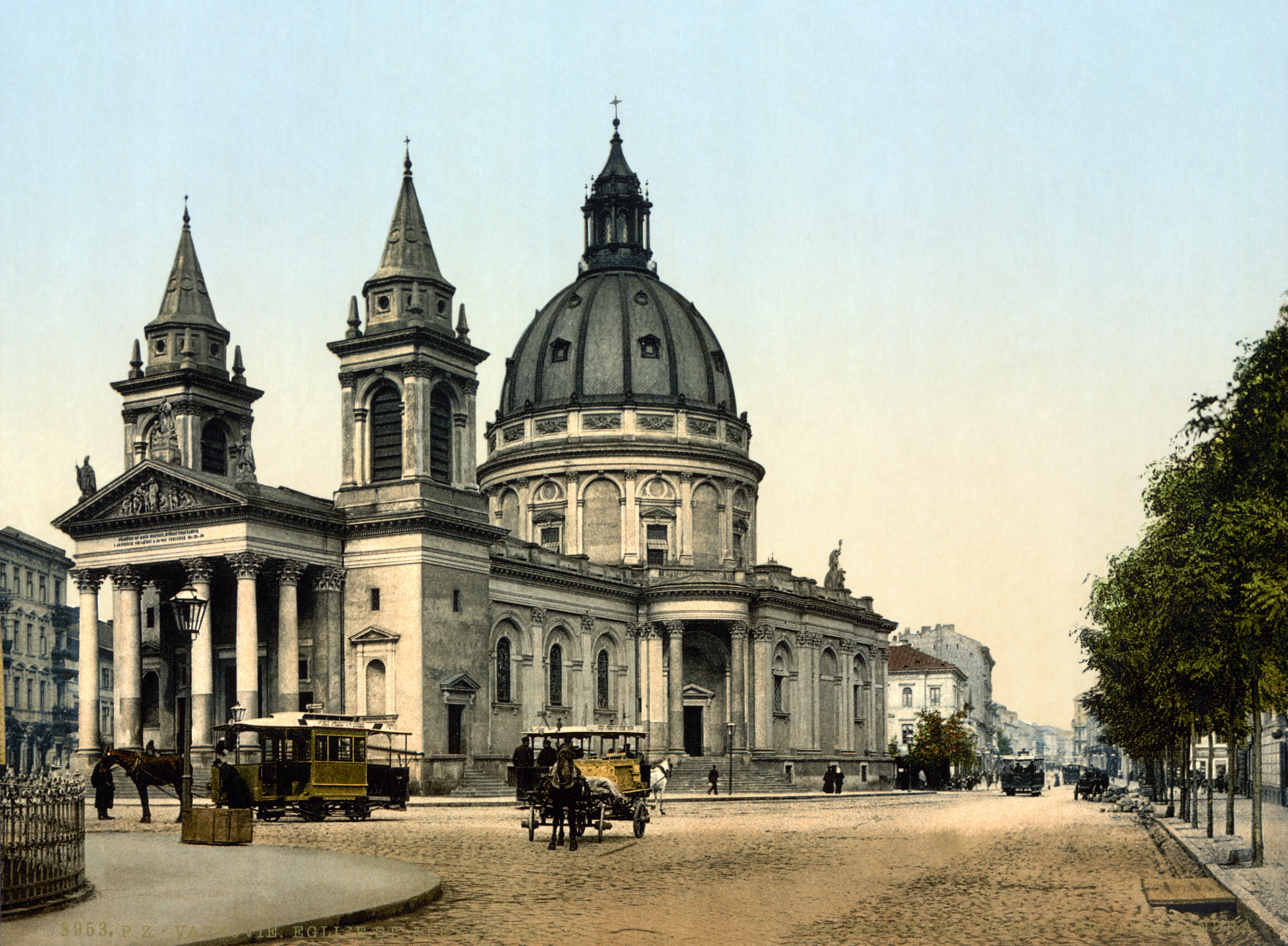
The church, c. 1890 – c. 1900

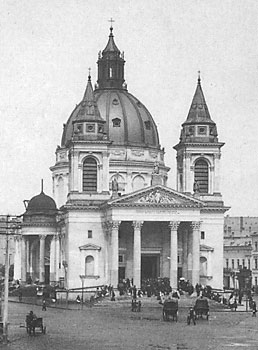
South facade, before 1939

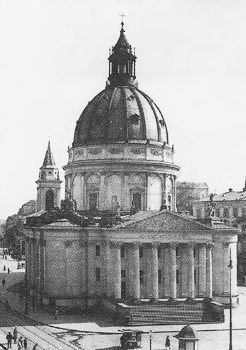
North facade, before 1939

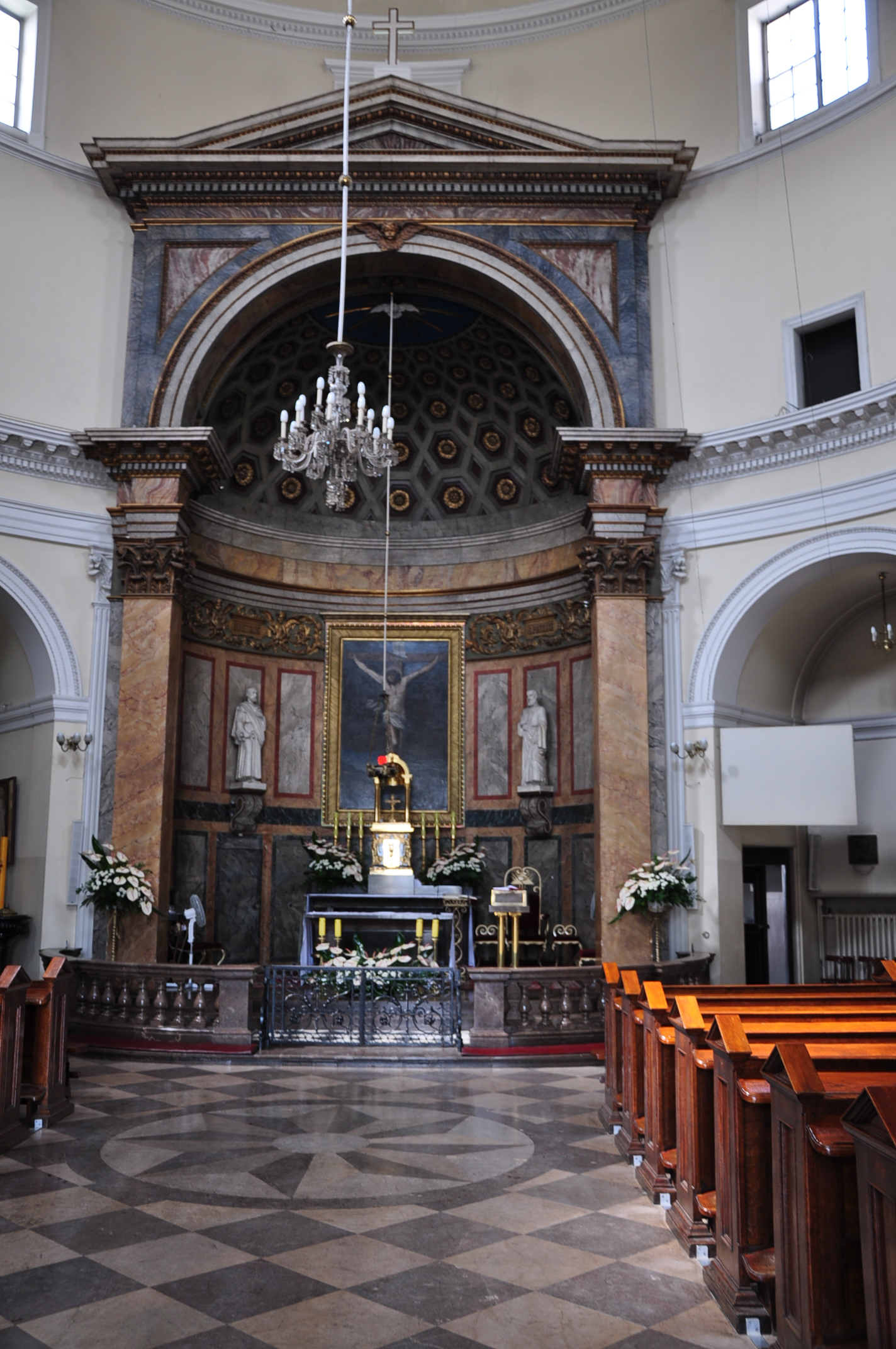
Interior with altar

== See also ==
- Polish classicism
- St. Anne's Church
- St. Florian's Cathedral
- Disbandment of Osa–Kosa 30
