= Adam Cyra =

Polish historian

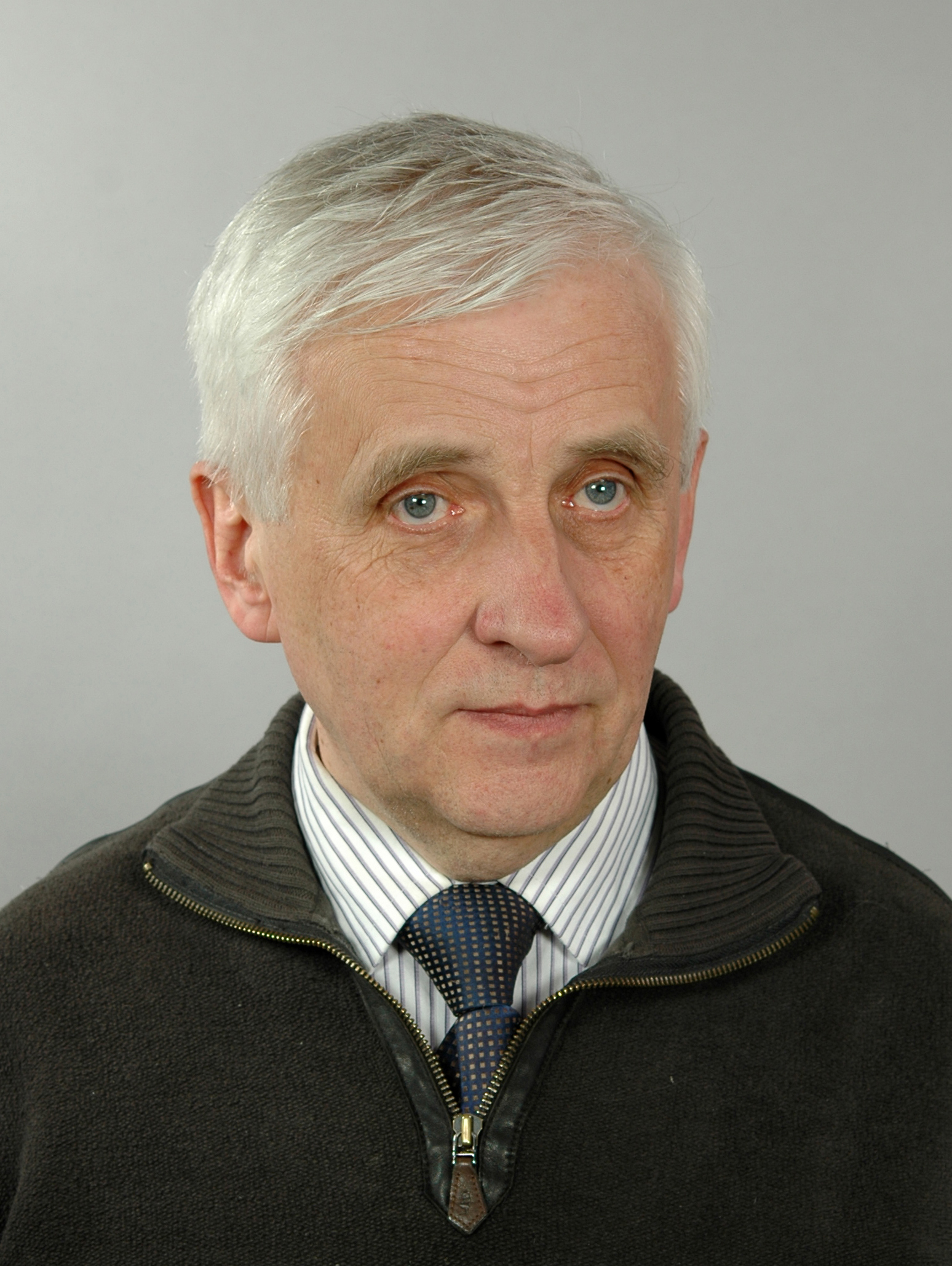
Adam Cyra

Adam Cyra (born 1949) is a Polish historian. A specialist in World War II history of Central Europe, he graduated from Jagiellonian University. Since 1972 he is a staff member of the Auschwitz-Birkenau State Museum in Oświęcim. His doctoral thesis at the Silesian University was on a Polish cavalry officer, intelligence agent, and resistance leader Witold Pilecki. He authored several dozen books and articles, mostly on World War II history of Poland and the Auschwitz concentration camp.

== Selected works ==
- Adam Cyra, Raport Witolda, „Biuletyn Towarzystwa Opieki nad Oświęcimiem” 1991 nr 12.
- Adam Cyra, Sylwetki niektórych żołnierzy AK – członków obozowego i przyobozowego ruchu oporu. Uroczystość odsłonięcia i poświęcenia pamiątkowej tablicy w hołdzie żołnierzom Armii Krajowej i ludziom niosącym pomoc więźniom Oświęcimia, Katowice 1995.
- Adam Cyra, Wiesław J. Wysocki, Rotmistrz Witold Pilecki, Warszawa 1997. ISBN 8386857277
- Adam Cyra, Ochotnik do Auschwitz. Witold Pilecki (1901-1948), Oświęcim 2000 ISBN 83-912000-3-5, ISBN 83-912000-4-3
- Adam Cyra, Cichociemny z Babic. Major Piotr Szewczyk (1908-1988), Oświęcim 2000, Warszawa 2006, Oświęcim - Tułowice 2016. ISBN 978-83-946244-7-7
- Adam Cyra, Pozostał po nich ślad...życiorysy z cel śmierci, Oświęcim 2006. ISBN 83-60210-20-9
- Adam Cyra, Mieszkańcy ziemi olkuskiej w hitlerowskich więzieniach i obozach koncentracyjnych, Oświęcim – Olkusz 2005. ISBN 83-60210-02-0
- Adam Cyra, Spadochroniarz „Urban”. Ppor. Stefan Jasieński (1914-1945), Oświęcim 2005. ISBN 83-88526-85-5
- Adam Cyra, Upamiętnienie Żydów olkuskich. 65. rocznica likwidacji getta w Olkuszu – czerwiec 2007 r., Oświęcim – Olkusz 2007. ISSN 0860-4258
- Adam Cyra, Podobóz KL Auschwitz Harmęże, Oświęcim 2007. ISBN 978-83- 60367-64-3
- Adam Cyra, Banderowcy w KL Auschwitz, (in:) „Studia nad Faszyzmem i Zbrodniami Hitlerowskimi”, t. XXX, Wrocław 2008.
- Adam Cyra, Żwirownia obok Theatergebäude jako miejsce zbrodni w KL Auschwitz, (w:) „Studia nad Faszyzmem i Zbrodniami Hitlerowskimi”, t. XXXIV, Wrocław 2012.
