= Eugeniusz Świerczewski =

Polish journalist, drama critic, and Gestapo agent

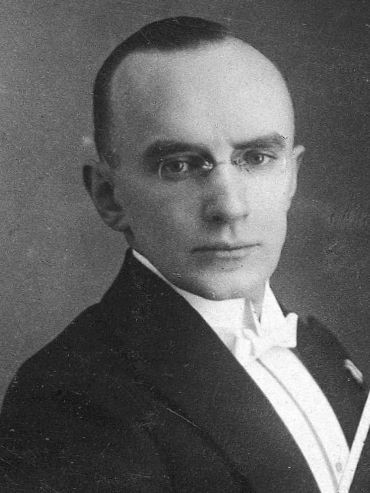
- Świerczewski as secretary of the National Theater in Warsaw (1925)
- Born: 18 September 1894; Warsaw, Congress Poland
- Died: 20 June 1944 (aged 49); Warsaw, German-occupied Poland
- Occupations: Journalist, soldier, drama critic, and Gestapo agent
- Status: Executed by hanging
- Conviction: Treason
- Penalty: Death

Eugeniusz Świerczewski (18 September 1894 – 20 June 1944) was a Polish journalist, soldier and drama critic.

During World War II, Świerczewski worked as an undercover agent for the Gestapo in the Polish Home Army. He is one of those blamed for betraying Home Army leader Stefan Rowecki. Świerczewski was later discovered, tried for treason by the Polish Underground State, and executed by hanging.

== Military service ==
During the 1919 to 1920 Polish-Soviet War, Świerczewski served as a lieutenant in the Polish Army. In 1923, he was made an officer of the reserve in the 15th Wolves Infantry Regiment in Dęblin. He was made a second lieutenant with a seniority date of July 1921 and continued until 1923.

== Journalist ==
After the war, Świerczewski lived in Warsaw and worked as a journalist and theater critic. He was also a member of the society of Promoting Culture. In 1934, he remained in the records of the District Recruiting Command for Warsaw City III.

During the German occupation of Poland, he worked with the ZWZ-AK under the pseudonym "Gens" with the number "100". After his wife was arrested by the Germans, her brother Ludwik Kalkstein persuaded Świerczewski to become a German agent in exchange for her release. He took part in the dismantling of the branch of the AK Headquarters and the exposure of underground General Stefan "Grot" Rowecki. After being uncovered as a spy, Świerczewski was tried and convicted of treason by the Polish Underground State. Under the command of Stefan "Józef" Ryś, Świerczewski was hanged in the basement of Krochmalna Street 74.

== Bibliography ==
- Leszek Gondek: Polska karząca 1939-1945, Instytut Wydawniczy Pax, Warszawa 1988, ISBN 83-211-0973-X
- strona poświęcona Stefanowi Roweckiemu
- Waldemar Grabowski: "Kalkstein i Kaczorowska w świetle akt UB". Biuletyn IPN z 2004
