= Tomasz Strzembosz =

Polish historian and writer (1930–2004)

- Born: September 11, 1930; Warsaw
- Died: October 16, 2004 (aged 74); Warsaw, Poland
- Education: Warsaw University
- Occupation: Historian
- Writing career
- Language: Polish
- Genre: Non-fiction
- Subject: World War II history
- Notable work: Rzeczpospolita podziemna
- Notable awards: Custodian of National Memory Prize

Tomasz Strzembosz (11 September 1930 – 16 October 2004) was a Polish historian and writer who specialized in the World War II history of Poland. He was a professor at the Polish Academy of Sciences Institute of Political Studies, in Warsaw; and, from 1991, at the John Paul II Catholic University of Lublin. Strzembosz was a resident of Warsaw, Poland.

== Postwar career ==
After World War II, Tomasz Strzembosz was persecuted by the Polish People's Republic government's Urząd Bezpieczeństwa (Security Office). In the mid-1950s, Stalinist Poland he was prevented from obtaining a master's degree and was repeatedly laid off from work.

Strzembosz was one of the few Polish People's Republic historians who refused to write Soviet-inspired falsehoods about Poland's history. His main areas of research included the history of the World War II Polish Underground State, with special emphasis on German-occupied Warsaw; the Polish partisan movement in the Kresy macroregion between 1939 and 1941, following the Soviet invasion of Poland; and the 1944–46 anti-communist resistance in Poland.

In the 1980s, Strzembosz was an activist in the anti-communist Solidarity movement. In 1989–93, he was president of the Polish Scouting Association (photo).

Strzembosz authored a dozen books and over 100 scholarly papers. He also edited or reviewed over a dozen works by other authors. In 2002, he received Poland's Custodian of National Memory Prize. His doctoral students included Sławomir Poleszak.

== Family ==
Tomasz Strzembosz was one of a set of triplets, with Roman-Catholic activist Teresa and law-professor-judge Adam Strzembosz, who served as chief justice of Poland's Supreme Court. Tomasz married Maria (Maryla) Dawidowska, sister of anti-Nazi underground scouting hero Maciej Aleksy Dawidowski.

== Bibliography ==
=== Books ===
- Tumult warszawski 1525 r., PWN, Warszawa 1959
- Odbijanie i uwalnianie więźniów w Warszawie 1939-1944, PWN, Warsaw 1972
- Ludność cywilna w powstaniu warszawskim 1944, et al. Vol. 1, PIW, Warsaw 1974 (Academy of Sciences Award)
- Akcje zbrojne podziemnej Warszawy 1939-1945, PIW, Warsaw 1978, reprinted: PWN 1983
- Oddziały szturmowe konspiracyjnej Warszawy 1939-1945, PWN, 1979, ISBN 83-01-00085-6
- Szare Szeregi jako organizacja wychowawcza, IWZZ, Warsaw 1984
- Refleksje o Polsce i podziemiu 1939-1945, Spotkania, Lublin 1986, reprinted 1990
- Bohaterowie "Kamieni na szaniec" w świetle dokumentów, PWN, Warsaw 1994
- Saga o "Łupaszce" ppłk. Jerzym Dąbrowskim 1889-1941, Rytm, Warsaw 1996
- Rzeczpospolita podziemna (1939 - 1945), Krupski i Spółka, Warsaw 2000
- W stronę zachodzącego słońca, RYTM, Warsaw 2003
- Antysowiecka partyzantka i konspiracja nad Biebrzą X 1939 - VI 1941, 2004.
