= Battle of Radom =

1939 Invasion of Poland battle in WWII

- Part of Invasion of Poland
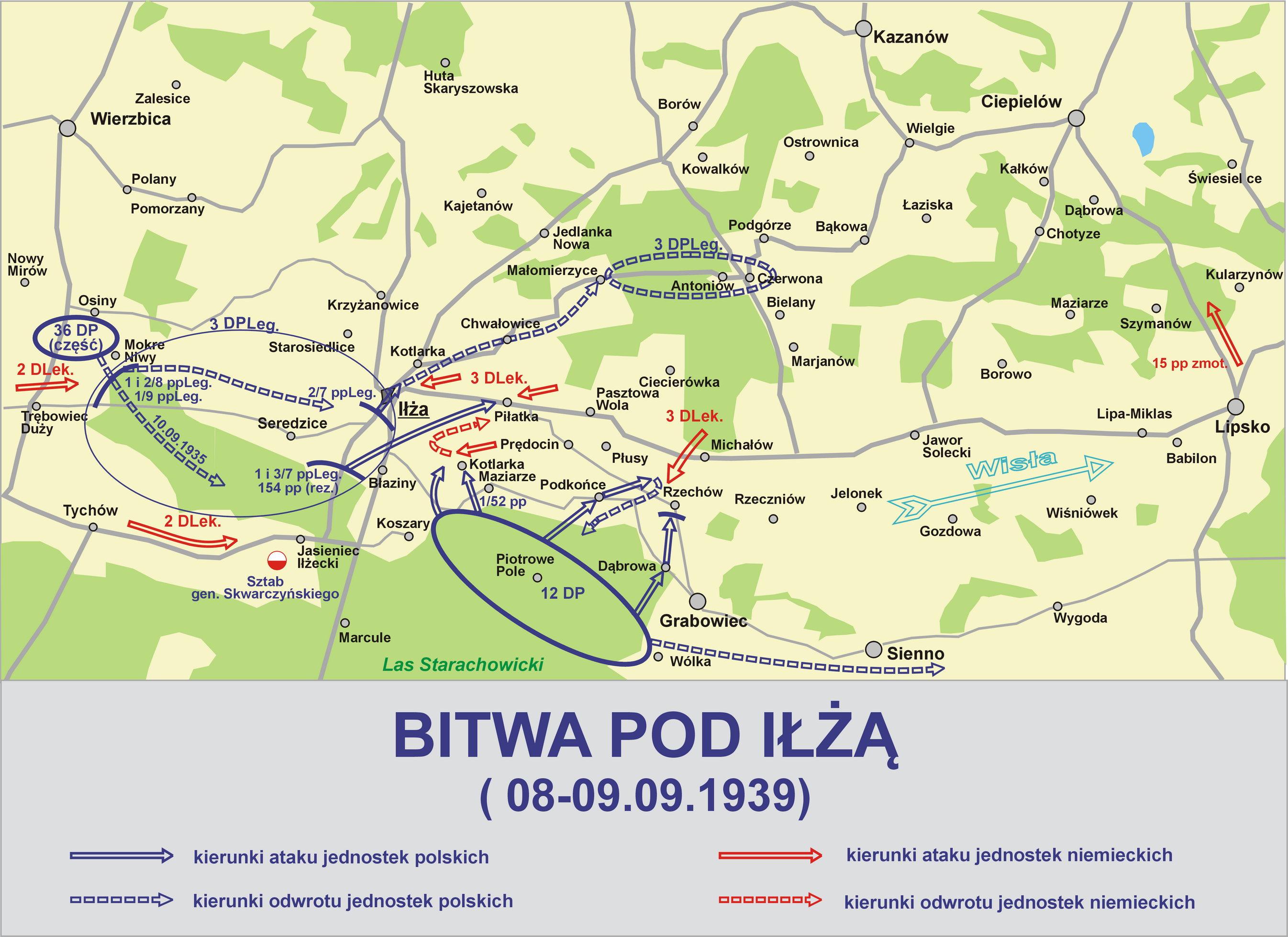
- Bitwa ilza 1939
Date	8–9 September 1939
Location	Iłża near Radom, Kielce Voivodeship, Poland 51°09′44″N 21°14′13″E
Result	German victory

Belligerents
Germany	Poland

Commanders and leaders
(Nazi Germany) Walther von Reichenau (Nazi Germany) Adolf-Friedrich Kuntzen	(Second Polish Republic) Stanisław Skwarczyński

Strength
Unknown	Unknown

Casualties and losses
Unknown	Unknown
- Location within Masovian Voivodeship Battle of Radom (Poland)

The Battle of Radom, also known as the Battle of Iłża, was part of the Invasion of Poland during the Second World War. It lasted from 8 September 1939 to 9 September 1939. Polish troops of the Prusy Army, under General Stanisław Skwarczyński, defended the city of Iłża and the road from Sandomierz to Radom. The Poles were not ready to meet head on overwhelming German XV Army Corps (General Hermann Hoth), and were easily defeated after two days of fighting. Prusy Army, in the aftermath of the battle, ceased to exist. Some of the army's units joined other tactical groupings of the Polish armed forces.

== Background ==
Armia Prusy, which was regarded as strategic reserve of Polish forces, remained deep behind front line, and was not planned to enter the battle before mid-September. To the surprise of Polish headquarters, after the first week of fighting, motorized and panzer units of German 10th Army broke through a gap between Kraków Army and Łódź Army, near Częstochowa, and marched northwards to Warsaw.

The battle began when southern wing of Prusy Army, which consisted of three infantry divisions (3rd Legions Infantry, 12th Infantry and 36th Infantry), together with Operational Group Kielce, clashed with motorized forces of German 10th Army, which blocked the routes towards the Vistula river.

On September 8, 7th Polish Infantry Regiment (3rd Division), supported by two artillery batteries, captured Ilza. Its battalions were scattered around the town, while 12th Infantry Division was located in northern parts of the Starachowice Forest, next to an armored regiment of Kraków Cavalry Brigade. First contact of 3rd Infantry Division with the enemy took place at midday. East of Ilza, German motorized units were halted by Polish regiments. The Germans regrouped and attacked again, but failed to break through Polish lines.

Soon afterwards, German 3rd Light Division entered the battle, but its advance was also checked, near the village of Pilatka. Another German assault was halted near the village of Kotlarka, and the enemy had to retreat southwards, to the road Ilza - Lipsko. At app. 3 p.m., German tanks were repelled near Trebowiec Duzy, and finally, after artillery barrage, the Germans attacked Ilza, at 6 p.m. Polish 7th Infantry Regiment had to retreat, and managed only to keep its positions near the ruins of the Ilza Castle.

Surrounded by the Wehrmacht, 12th Infantry Division attempted to break out. Despite initial success of 52nd Infantry Regiment, which destroyed large quantities of German equipment, the enemy checked the Poles. By nightfall of September 8, 3rd Legions Infantry was ordered to march towards Czerwona, while 12th Infantry, divided into two columns, headed towards Ciecierówka.

In the morning of September 9, remains of the 3rd Legions Division, commanded by Colonel Stanisław Tatar, were located in a forest by Czerwona. Smaller groups of Polish soldiers tried to get into the Kozienice Forest, but most failed. At the same time, 12th Infantry had difficulty in reaching the Starachowice Forest, as in the night German forces had been reinforced. Northern column of 12th Infantry was stuck near Kotlarka, as its morning attack was checked by the enemy.

Southern column, which was to march towards Michałów, had to wait for its 51st Infantry Regiment, commanded by Colonel Emil August Fieldorf. The regiment was stuck on local roads, and the column finally set off at 5 a.m., but soon afterwards was checked near Stary Rzechów. Under the circumstances, Generals Skwarczynski and Paszkiewicz gathered their officers in the village of Piotrowe Pole, and decided to break their units into small groups, heading towards the Vistula. As a result of this decision, Operational Group of General Skwarczynski de facto ceased to exist.

During the entire battle, Wolfram von Richthofen, had sent in 135 Junkers Ju 87 to bomb the Polish positions.

== Commemoration ==
The Battle of Ilza / Radom is commemorated on the Tomb of the Unknown Soldier, Warsaw, with the inscription "ILZA 8 IX 1939"

== See also ==
- History of Poland (1939–1945)
- List of World War II military equipment of Poland
- List of German military equipment of World War II
