= Emil Kumor =

- Born: 14 January 1899; Schodnica, Russian Empire
- Died: 28 December 1957 (aged 58); Komorów, Polish People's Republic
- Burial place: Powązki Military Cemetery, Warsaw
- Other name: Krzyś
- Military career
- Allegiance: Second Republic of Poland; Polish People's Republic
- Branch: Army
- Service years: 1916-1946
- Rank: Podpułkownik (Lieutenant colonel)
- Units: 9th Legions' Infantry Regiment; 3rd Legions Infantry Division; Cadet Corps No. 1; 40th Lviv Children's Infantry Regiment; Home Army Headquarters; 62nd Infantry Regiment; 41st Infantry Regiment
- Conflicts: First World War; Second World War<Warsaw Uprising
- Awards
- Other work: Author

Emil Kumor, code name "Krzyś" (14 January 1899 in Schodnica – 28 December 1957) was a Lieutenant-Colonel of the Polish Army, soldier of the September Campaign and the Warsaw Uprising, officer of the Main Command of the SZP and Main Command of the ZWZ and Home Army. In 1942, Kumor initiated and organized "Operation Góral", a successful heist during which a German money transport worth 105 million Polish zlotys was captured.

== Biography ==
In 1916, Kumor joined the 2nd Infantry Regiment of the Polish Legions, where he was promoted to the rank of second lieutenant.

In June 1921, Kumor served as commander of the 3rd Legions Infantry Division while his main unit was the 9th Legions Infantry Regiment. On 3 May 1922 he was promoted to the rank of lieutenant. In the years 1922–1929 he was the commander of the company in the 9th Legions' Infantry Regiment in Zamość, and then of the 40th Infantry Regiment in Lviv. On 2 December 1930 he was appointed captain with seniority from 1 January 1931, and the 40th position in the corps of infantry officers. For 5 years he was the adjutant of the Cadet Corps No. 1 in Lviv; in turn – until the outbreak of the war – he was an ordnance officer of Brigadier General Michał Karaszewicz-Tokarzewski, commander of the Corps District No. VI in Lviv, and from 1938 commander of the Corps District No. VIII in Toruń.

During the September Campaign in 1939, Kumor took part in the Battle of the Bzura, and then, along with General Tokarzewski and a group of a dozen or so officers, he managed to get into besieged Warsaw.

As a member of General Tokarzewski's staff, he took an active part in forming the first underground resistance organization in the country: The Service for Poland's Victory. Later, with the creation of the Union of Armed Struggle (later known as the Home Army), he held positions of responsibility in Branch I, and then in Division VII of the Home Army Headquarters. During this period, he directed the Legalization Department and organized a network of hideouts and safe houses in Warsaw. He arranged, among other things, the lodgings of General Stefan Rowecki – “Grot” – the commander of the Home Army. In 1942 he was appointed major. In the same year, he initiated, and a year later organized, the famous Operation “Góral” under the direct supervision of general “Grot”. This action involved a heist of over a million US dollars' worth of currency being transported by Nazi German authorities on 12 August 1943. It was carried out in the center of Warsaw by a Kedyw "Motor" unit, which seized a transport car carrying the money. It was one of the best organized actions by the Polish underground during the German occupation.

During the Warsaw Uprising (1 August – 3 October 1944), Kumor was the inspector of the combat section in the city center. During that time, he organized an insurgent grenade factory and contributed to the detection and protection of large grain stocks in Haberbusch's warehouses, later used to feed the fighters of Warsaw.

After the fall of the Uprising, Kumor was taken prisoner by the Germans and placed in the Oflag II-C prisoner-of-war camp. After the release of Polish prisoners of war by the Soviet army in January 1945, he returned and reported to the ranks of the Polish Army. Initially, he was deputy commander of the 41st infantry regiment in Goleniów, later he was appointed commander of the 62nd infantry regiment stationed in Skierniewice, and then in Ełk, where he took an active part in the reconstruction of damaged areas, gaining recognition from the local society.

In 1946, due to poor health, he retired at his own request. In 1949, he was arrested and imprisoned for political reasons and released in 1953 after the investigation was discontinued. After his release, Kumor devoted himself to journalistic work, publishing a number of articles in magazines about the activities of the Polish resistance during the occupation. His book, A Clipping From the History of One Life, was re-published by Platan in 2011. Kumor died suddenly on 28 December 1957 from heart problems.

He authored Wycinek z historii jednego zycia, published 1969 (Excerpt from the history of one life).

== Medals and honors ==
- Commander's Cross of the Order of Polonia Restituta (posthumously, 4 July 2016)”
- Cross of Independence (16 September 1931)
- Cross of Valour (twice)
- Cross of Valour (twice)
- Golden Cross of Merit
- Silver Cross of Merit
- Partisan Cross
- Medal of the 10th Anniversary of the War of Independence (Latvija)
