= Battle of Iłża (1864) =

- Part of the January Uprising
Date	17 January 1864
Location	Iłża
Result	Polish victory

Belligerents
(Poland) Polish insurgents	Russian Empire

Commanders and leaders
Karol Kalita	Colonel Sukhonin

Strength
830	400

Casualties and losses
5 dead and 14 wounded	Much higher dead

The Battle of Iłża, one of many clashes of the January Uprising, took place on January 17, 1864, near the town of Iłża, which at that time belonged to Russian-controlled Congress Poland. A party of 830 Polish rebels, commanded by Karol Kalita, clashed with a 400-strong detachment of the Imperial Russian Army. Poles lost 5 men, while Russian losses were much higher.

The battle began when Russian infantry and Cossacks under Colonel Sukhonin attacked three rebel companies of Polish 3rd Stopnica Regiment, which were stationed in the village of Lubienia. The Russians probably underestimated strength of rebel units, as soon after their attack, two additional Polish companies entered the battle, with two more attacking Russians from their rear. Sukhonin and his soldiers put up a fierce fight, but after some time, he was pushed towards Iłża, where Russians defended themselves in houses. As darkness fell, the skirmish came to an end, and Polish commandant Karol Kalita ordered his men to head towards Prędocin.

The battle of Iłża was commemorated on Warsaw's Tomb of the Unknown Soldier, with the inscription “IłŻA 17 I 1864".

== Sources ==
- Stefan Kieniewicz: Powstanie styczniowe. Warszawa: Państwowe Wydawnictwo Naukowe, 1983. ISBN 83-01-03652-4.
