= Antoni Heda =

Polish military commander (1916–2008)

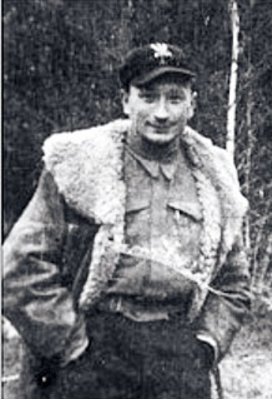
- Nickname: Szary (Gray)
- Born: 11 October 1916; Małomierzyce, Poland
- Died: 15 February 2008 (aged 91)
- Service years: 1937–1939
- Rank: Brigadier General
- Conflicts: World War II, Anti-Soviet resistance
- Awards: Virtuti Militari Cross of the Valorous

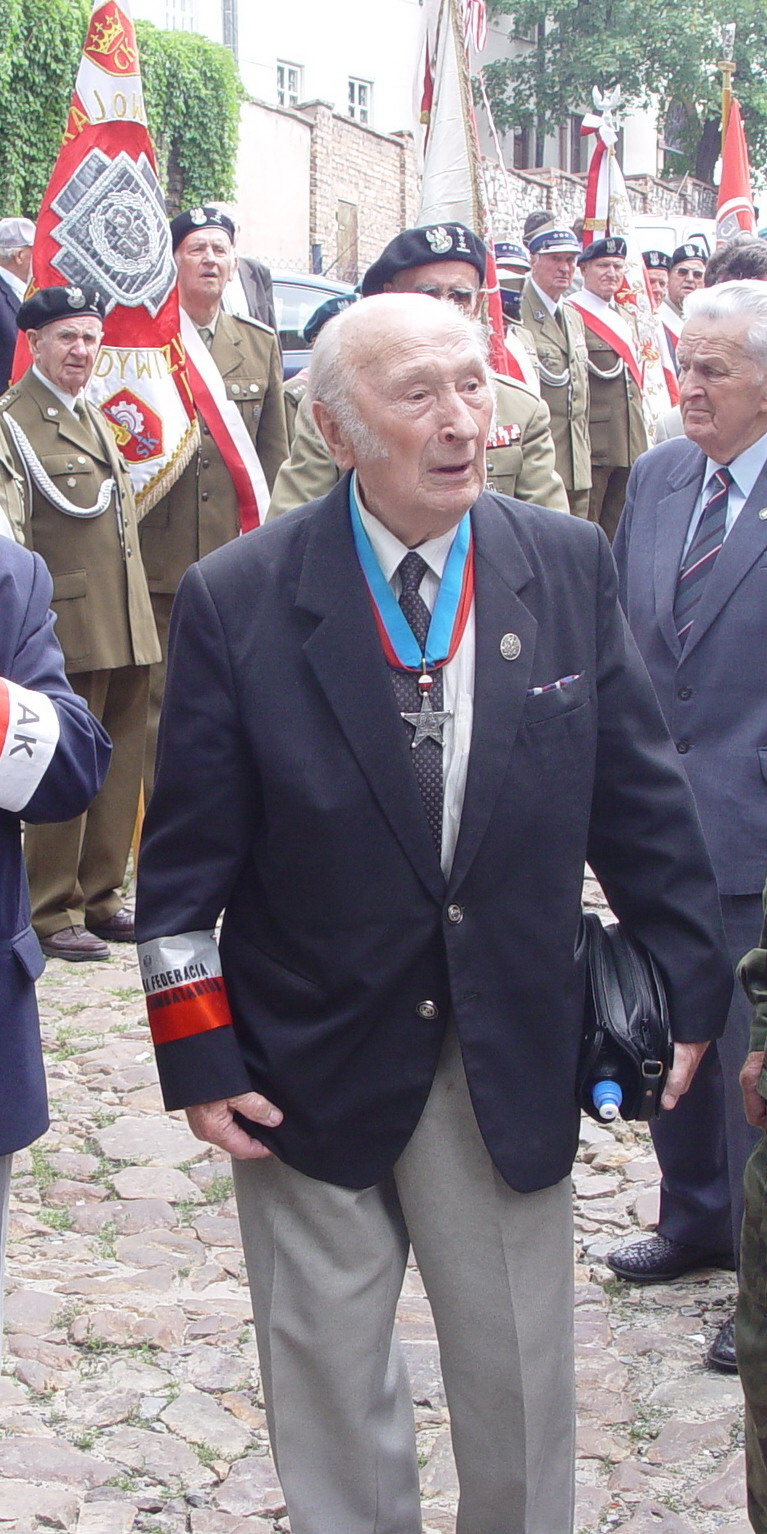
2005

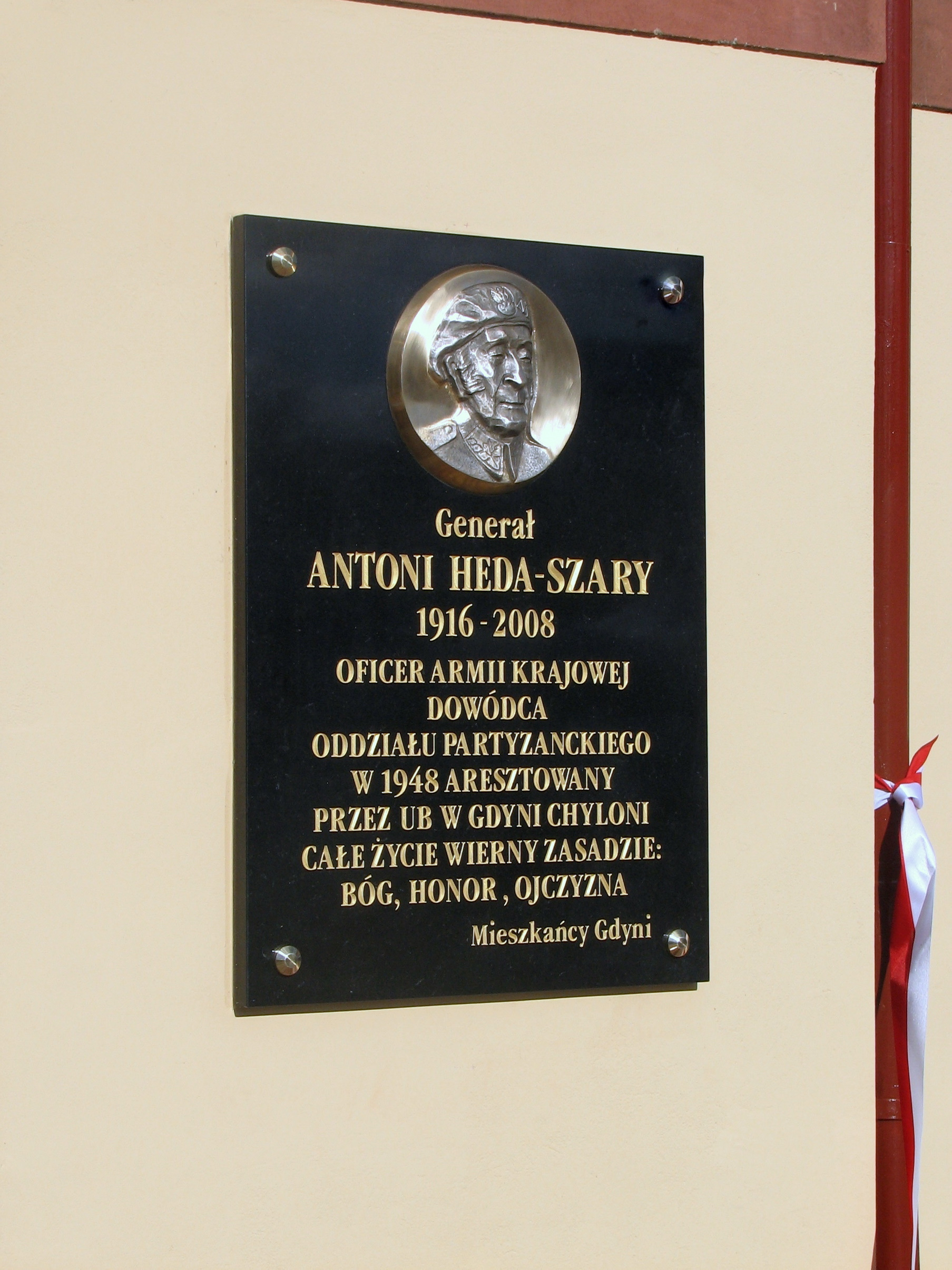
Plaque commemorating general Antoni Heda at Gdynia Chylonia train station. Here he was arrested by communist Ministry of Public Security.

Antoni Heda (11 October 1916 – 15 February 2008) was a Polish military commander and a notable veteran of the Polish resistance movement in World War II and later independence movement against Soviet occupation following the war. Among the best known of his partisan actions was the raid on Communist prison in Kielce in August 1945, in which roughly 300 political prisoners were freed. His codename was "Szary" (Grey).

== Early life and activities at the beginning of the Second World War ==
Antoni Heda was born in 1916 in the village of Małomierzyce near Iłża to a local peasant family. After graduating from a local primary school he moved to Radom, where he finished a Technical School and started a job in Starachowice Arms Works. Drafted into the Polish Army in 1937, he was dispatched to the Reserve Officer School (Szkoła Podchorążych Rezerwy). Shortly before the outbreak of World War II he was demobilized and started working for the State Arms Works at Starachowice.

Mobilized prior to the outbreak of the Polish Defensive War of 1939, Heda fought in the ranks of the Polish 12th Infantry Division in the area of his home town of Iłża and then in the area of Lublin. After his division was disbanded he was trying to find his way to Hungary, but was arrested by the Soviet NKVD and imprisoned in the Brześć Fortress. After the outbreak of a Nazi-Soviet war when the prison was taken over by the Germans, he managed to escape from the prison camp.

== Underground activities during the Second World War ==
Heda returned to his home area and joined the ranks of the Society of Armed Struggle (ZWZ), the first mass-scale resistance organization formed in Poland. Named the commander of the Dolina area (in the Holy Cross Mountains), he became a notable resistance leader after his raid on the Gestapo prison in Starachowice. Out of 80 political prisoners liberated from there, 60 decided to join the resistance and thus Heda formed a permanent partisan unit stationed in the forests of the area. He then joined the partisan unit of Jan Piwnik Ponury, one of the most successful partisan commanders of World War II.

Heda took part in a variety of actions against the Germans in occupied Poland, among the best known are:

- Raid on the German prison in Iłża on 6 August 1943.
- Disarming of a 45 men strong unit of the Wehrmacht stationed in Pakosław near Iłża on 15 September 1943.
- Action against the village of Gozdawa near Sienno, which had been cleansed of their Polish inhabitants and then settled with Germans; the action took place on 23 September 1943.
- March 1944 assault on the Starachowice Arms Works, in which the partisans dressed in German uniforms secured the entire factory, seized its treasury and secured several hundred pieces of arms.
- Battle of Jeleniec of 1 April 1944, in which the partisans managed to defeat a considerable German force that was trying to ambush them.
- Raid on Końskie on 5 and 6 June 1944, in which the partisans secured the entire city and set free the prisoners of a local prison.

During Operation Tempest Heda's unit was attached to the 2nd battalion of the Polish 3rd Legions' Infantry Regiment under Capt. Stanisław Poręba Świątek and took part in battles of Radoszyce, Trawniki and Szewce.

== Anti-Soviet resistance ==
After the Soviet-backed Polish communist takeover of Poland, Heda - as a former prisoner of the NKVD - had to remain in hiding and joined the Ruch Oporu Armii Krajowej, one of splinter organizations formed after the Home Army had been disbanded. Later on he joined NIE and then yet another resistance organization Freedom and Independence (WiN). As a leader of a separate unit, Heda led yet another assault on a prison, this time on a MBP and Smersh prison in Kielce overnight of 4 August 1945. As a result, the partisans managed to liberate several hundred political prisoners, mostly former members of the Home Army.

Heda was using a false identity (Antoni Wiśniewski) but the UB security forces managed to discover Heda's identity and arrested his family. Soon afterwards two of his brothers and his brother-in-law were tortured to death. Heda planned to organize a similar assault on the infamous Rakowiecka prison in Warsaw, but he was arrested by the forces of the Internal Security Corps in 1948 in Gdynia near the Gdynia Chylonia railway station. Imprisoned at Rakowiecka and later in Rawicz and Wronki, Heda was sentenced to death on 7 consecutive charges, but his sentence was later changed to life imprisonment.

After the end of Stalinist period in 1956 he was pardoned and set free. He continued to collaborate with various groups opposed to the Communist regime in Poland and was also an active member of unofficial veterans associations. In 1980 he joined the Solidarity and the following year he was chosen as the chairman of the Independent Veteran Association of the Solidarity, the first veteran association not controlled by the Communist authorities. However, soon afterwards he had been interned after the 1981 imposition of martial Law in Poland.

After Poland managed to get back its independence from the Eastern Bloc, in 1990 Heda returned to service as a leader of one of veteran associations uniting veterans of all fronts of World War II. He also became the honorary commander of the Riflemen Union, a paramilitary youth organization. He participated in Polish political life. In 1997 he spoke against adoption of a new Polish Constitution (created by post-Communist Democratic Left Alliance) by saying: "is against the Polish nation, it is for atheists and communistic masons."

On 3 May 2006 he was promoted to the rank of generał brygady (he received the nomination in 2004 and accepted it in 2006). For his service he also received the highest of Polish military awards, Virtuti Militari (4th and 5th class), as well as the Cross of Valour (Krzyż Walecznych) and other decorations.

He described his life in two books: Wspomnienia Szarego (Szary's Memoires) and Szary przeciw zdrajcom Polski (Szary against traitors of Poland).

General Antoni Heda died in Warsaw on 15 February 2008. His funeral took place on 21 February 2008, starting with a Funeral Mass at the Field Cathedral of the Polish Army celebrated by Fr. Bishop Maj-Gen. Tadeusz Płoskiego. President Lech Kaczynski posthumously awarded him the Commander's Cross with Star of the Order of Polonia Restituta, "for outstanding contribution to the independence of the Polish Republic". Heda was buried beside his wife in the family grave in the parish cemetery.
