= Marian Turkowski =

Polish general (1894–1948)

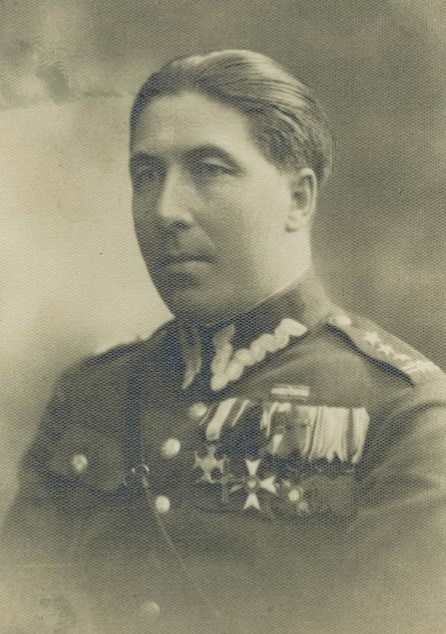

Marian Turkowski (1894–1948) was a soldier of Polish Legions in World War I and Polish II Corps in Russia, and officer, later General brygady of the Polish Army. Altogether, Turkowski served in different military units from 1914 until 1948, with the exception for World War II (1939 - 1945), during which he was kept as a German prisoner of war at Oflag VII-A Murnau.

Turkowski was born on 28 July 1894 in the village of Iwkowa, which at that time belonged to Austrian Galicia. He attended a high school in nearby Bochnia, after which studied law at Jagiellonian University in Kraków. In 1914, Turkowski joined Polish Legions Second (then Third) Infantry Regiment. Wounded in the Battle of Kostiuchnówka (July 1916), he was captured by the Russians. Released in 1917, Turkowski joined Polish II Corps in Russia. Promoted to lieutenant, he fought in the Battle of Kaniów.

In November 1918, Turkowski joined the newly created Polish Army. In January 1919, he served in Białystok Rifle Regiment, which was in October 1921 renamed into 79th Infantry Regiment of Lew Sapieha. He fought in the Polish–Soviet War, and was captured by the Lithuanians.

In the Second Polish Republic, Turkowski commanded the 79th Infantry Regiment (until June 1933), infantry of the 27th Infantry Division at Kowel (1933 - 1935), lectured at the Center of Infantry Training at Rembertów (1935–1938), and finally commanded 3rd Legions Infantry Division from Zamość (May 1938 - September 1939). In 1938, Turkowski oversaw the destruction of Orthodox churches and prayer houses in the area east of Lublin .

In the Polish September Campaign, his division belonged to Operational Group of General Stanisław Skwarczyński, part of Prusy Army. Wounded in the Battle of Radom (8 September 1939), he was captured by the Germans, and sent to hospital. After release, Turkowski spent the war at Oflag VII-A Murnau in Bavaria.

In mid-1945 Turkowski returned to now-Communist Poland, and reentered the army. In 1946, as commandant of the 7th Infantry Division, he was promoted to General brygady. On 30 September 1948 Turkowski was released from active service, due to health problems. He died on 13 December 1948 in Warsaw, and was buried at the Powązki Cemetery.

== Awards ==
- Silver Cross of the Virtuti Militari (1922),
- Officer Cross of the Polonia Restituta,
- Order of the Cross of Grunwald, Third Class,
- Cross of Independence (1931),
- Gold Cross of Merit
- Cross of Valour (Poland).

== Sources ==
- Tadeusz Jurga: Obrona Polski 1939. Warszawa: Instytut Wydawniczy PAX, 1990
