= Křižanovice =

Křižanovice may refer to places in the Czech Republic:

- Křižanovice (Chrudim District), a municipality and village in the Pardubice Region
- Křižanovice (Vyškov District), a municipality and village in the South Moravian Region
- Křižanovice u Vyškova, a municipality and village in the South Moravian Region

== See also ==
- Krzyżanowice (disambiguation)
