= Krzyżanowice =

Krzyżanowice may refer to the following places in Poland:

- Krzyżanowice, Lower Silesian Voivodeship (south-west Poland)
- Krzyżanowice, Lesser Poland Voivodeship (south Poland)
- Krzyżanowice, Masovian Voivodeship (east-central Poland)
- Krzyżanowice, Silesian Voivodeship (south Poland)
