= Stefan Bembiński =

Stefan Bembiński

Stefan Bembiński (nom de guerre Harnaś - a traditional title for the leader of a Podhallian or Carpathian bandit band)) (born 24 July 1917 in Łagowiec Opatowski; died 1 January 1998) was a Polish veteran of World War II, member of the Home Army, and a Polish senator.

== Interwar period ==
In the interwar period, Bembiński finished the State Seminary for Education in Kielce. From 1936 he worked in public schools in Wsola and Kobylnik, at first as an instructor and later as a director of the Kobylnik school. Between 1938 and 1939 he attended the School for Reserve Cadets of the 8th Division of Infantry in Pułtusk.

== World War II ==
He took part in the fighting during the Nazi invasion of Poland. He was captured and imprisoned as a prisoner of war, but he managed to escape and returned to Kobylnik where he resumed work at the school. Soon he became active in underground anti-Nazi resistance in the Radom Home Army (AK) where he was the commander of a station in Błotnica. He was the second in command of the section for diversion and sabotage of the Radom Inspectorate and the head of the 72nd Infantry Regiment of the AK.

== After the war ==
He left Radom after the entry of the Red Army and moved to Kraków. In April 1945 he was arrested by communist authorities but soon released. He came back to Radom, where he participated in several armed actions of the anti-communist underground (among others, the capture of the prison in Kielce and the release of political prisoners in August 1945, the freeing of former AK soldiers from the Radom prison in September 1945). He was arrested again at the end of September 1945 and in February 1946 he was sentenced to death. His sentence was commuted to life in prison which he began serving in the prisons in Rawicz and Wronki. He was released in 1952 but he was forbidden to return to working in Education and as a result worked for the Director of Industrial Timber of Radom. He was thrown out of that position after a few years for political reasons. Subsequently, he worked as a construction worker and ran a produce shop. In his spare time he studied History at the Warsaw University and the Humanities at the Catholic University of Lublin.

== After October 1956 ==
He was active in Veteran's organizations. After the events of the "Polish October" in 1956 he organized in Radom the Society of Fighters for Freedom and Democracy, of which he became the president. Since the early 1980s, he was associated with the Solidarity movement. Among other functions, he was its president of the Section for Military Affairs in the Radom region. In June 1989, after the Polish Round Table Agreement he was elected as a Senator from the Radom Voivodeship. He was part of the Commission on Emigration and the Commission on Poles Abroad. As a veteran of World War II and the anti-communist resistance he was decorated with the Armia Krajowa Cross (The Home Army Cross), Cross of Valor and the Silver Cross of Virtuti Militari.
