= Jasieniec Iłżecki Górny =

- Village
- Location within Poland
- Coordinates: 51°7′10″N 21°10′40″E
- Country: Poland
- Voivodeship: Masovian
- County: Radom
- Gmina: Iłża
- Population: 870

Jasieniec Iłżecki Górny [jaˈɕɛɲɛt͡s iu̯ˈʐɛt͡ski ˈɡurnɨ] is a village in the administrative district of Gmina Iłża, within Radom County, Masovian Voivodeship, in east-central Poland.
