= Białka, Radom County =

Białka
- Village
- Location within Poland
- Coordinates: 51°8′8″N 21°12′39″E
- Country: Poland
- Voivodeship: Masovian
- County: Radom
- Gmina: Iłża
- Population: 523

Białka [ˈbjau̯ka] is a village in the administrative district of Gmina Iłża, within Radom County, Masovian Voivodeship, in east-central Poland.
