= Jasieniec Iłżecki Dolny =

- Village
- Location within Poland
- Coordinates: 51°6′24″N 21°10′37″E
- Country: Poland
- Voivodeship: Masovian
- County: Radom
- Gmina: Iłża

Jasieniec Iłżecki Dolny [jaˈɕɛɲɛt͡s iu̯ˈʐɛt͡ski ˈdɔlnɨ] is a village in the administrative district of Gmina Iłża, within Radom County, Masovian Voivodeship, in east-central Poland.
