= Chwałowice, Masovian Voivodeship =

Chwałowice
- Village
- Location within Poland
- Coordinates: 51°10′56″N 21°18′17″E
- Country: Poland
- Voivodeship: Masovian
- County: Radom
- Gmina: Iłża
- Population: 526

Chwałowice [xfawɔˈvit͡sɛ] is a village in the administrative district of Gmina Iłża, within Radom County, Masovian Voivodeship, in east-central Poland.
