= Prędocin-Kolonia =

- Village
- Location within Poland
- Coordinates: 51°9′0″N 21°17′54″E
- Country: Poland
- Voivodeship: Masovian
- County: Radom
- Gmina: Iłża

Prędocin-Kolonia [prɛnˈdɔt͡ɕin kɔˈlɔɲa] is a village in the administrative district of Gmina Iłża, within Radom County, Masovian Voivodeship, in east-central Poland.
