= Raid on Kielce Prison =

The Raid on Kielce Prison, which took place in Kielce, Poland, in the night of 4/5 August 1945, was carried out by members of anti-Communist resistance, the so-called Cursed soldiers. Their target was a Communist secret services prison, where soldiers of the Home Army, National Armed Forces and other organizations were kept. The raid was carried out by some 200 former Home Army soldiers, led by Antoni Heda and Stefan Bembiński. It resulted in the release of some 350 prisoners.

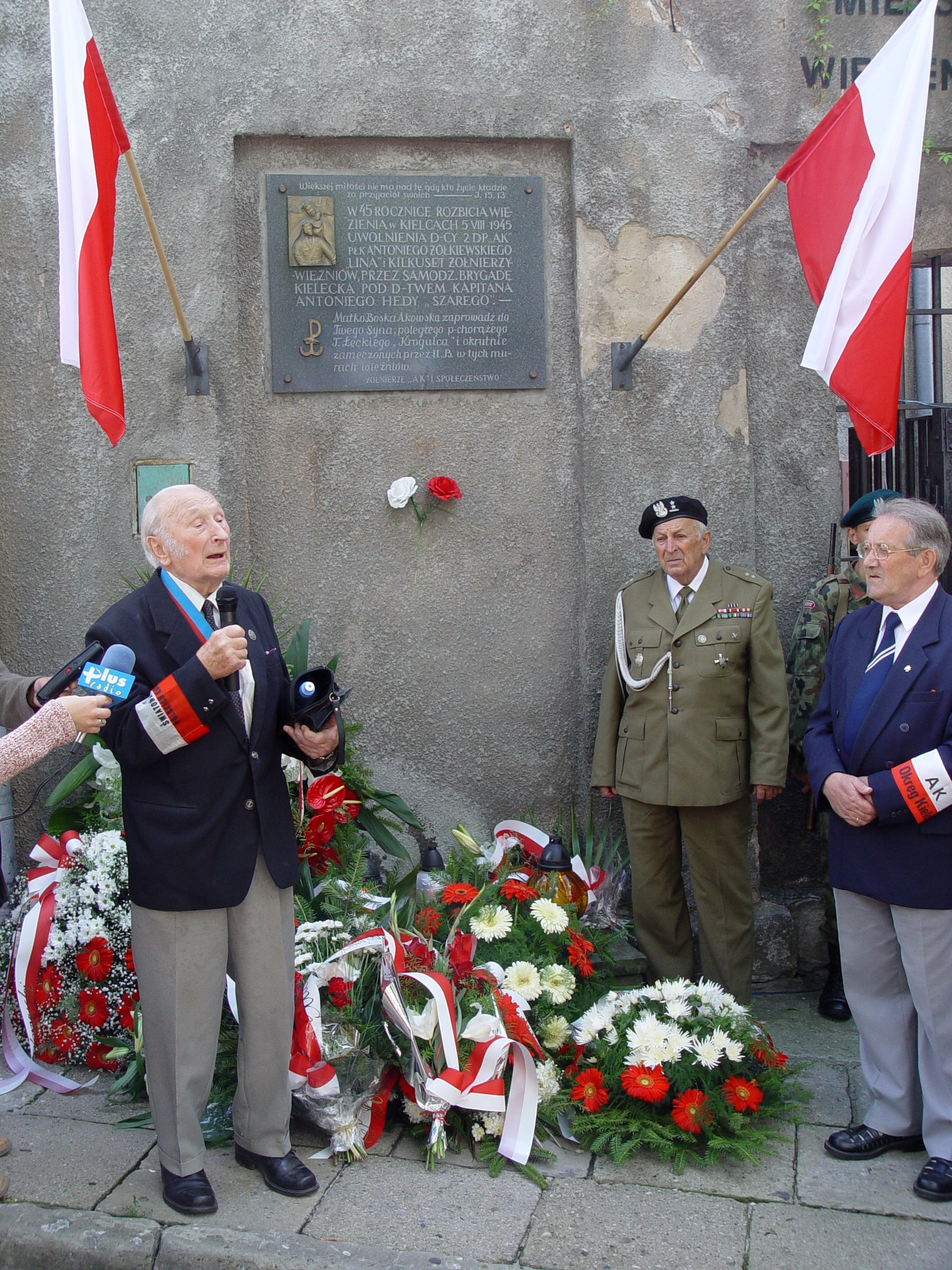
Antoni Heda speaking during the celebration of the 60th anniversary of the raid, Kielce 2005

== Background ==
In the spring of 1945, it became obvious that Communist and pro-Soviet government of Poland would not refrain from using terror as a method of fighting the so-called Cursed soldiers. Apart from mass arrests and repressions, a widespread propaganda operation was carried out, in which soldiers of the former Home Army were presented as "imperialists" and "drivelling midgets of reaction". With the help from Soviet forces, thousands of World War II heroes ended up in prisons across Poland.

Northern Lesser Poland, with the cities of Kielce and Radom, was one of main centers of anticommunist resistance. Various units of the movement fought the NKVD, Służba Bezpieczeństwa and Milicja Obywatelska. In late spring and early summer of 1945, a wave of arrests of Polish resistance fighters took place in the region. Most of them, including Antoni Żółkiewski and Michał Mandziara, were kept in the Kielce Prison on Zamkowa Street.

In the immediate postwar period Antoni Heda (nom de guerre Szary), who had been a legendary member of Polish resistance, tried to stay away from active participation in anti-Communist movements. Due to Soviet terror and mass arrests of Polish patriots, who were incarcerated in the former Gestapo prisons, Heda changed his mind and decided to mobilize his unit and raid the Kielce Prison.

At that time in various towns of Lesser Poland, underground organizations of the so-called Cursed soldiers attacked Communist prisons, releasing political prisoners. On 10 March 1945, a group of 100 Home Army soldiers escaped from a prison in Sandomierz. In the evening of 21 April 1945 in Jędrzejów, some 30 prisoners escaped from a local prison. In the night of 5/6 May 1945, a unit of 80 armed soldiers commanded by Captain Władysław Moleda took control of the town of Kozienice. Milicja Obywatelska officers were disarmed, but the rebels failed to capture the prison of local Urzad Bezpieczenstwa, where a number of Home Army soldiers was kept. On 9 September 1945, a unit of Colonel Stefan Bembiński raided the prison in Radom. The prison at Częstochowa was raided twice, but at both times the rebels failed. In the night of 3/4 June 1945, a unit of Zbigniew Stawowczyk and Stanisław Chmielewski tried to seize control over the prison at Pińczów, but failed to do so.

== Before the Raid ==
In late June 1945 Captain Heda went to Wolbórz, to visit the family of his wife. His adjutant, Colonel Antoni Switalski came with the news of Communist terror, telling him about the fate of Home Army soldiers, who had fought the Germans, and were then incarcerated by the Soviets and their Polish cronies.

In early July Heda returned to Kielce, and got in touch with his soldiers, who were still active. Among them were Colonel Edward Nadarkiewicz ("Narew"), who had been a quartermaster of local Home Army forces during the Operation Tempest and Colonel Wlodzimierz Dalewski ("Szparag"), who had been a sapper of Home Army's Third Infantry Regiment. Heda and Dalewski met each other in a forest near the road from Skarżysko-Kamienna to Radom. Szary told him about the plan, and asked his opinion. Both agreed that with the element of surprise the raid might be a success. After the meeting Dalewski returned to Kielce, to gather information about Communist forces stationed in the city and about the prison itself. Meanwhile, Heda was involved in the creation of the unit.

According to the preliminary plan, some 300 soldiers were necessary to carry out the raid. To find the appropriate men, Szary got in touch with officers of the Home Army from the area of Kielce. In early July 1945, a meeting took place in the village of Pogorzale. Apart from Heda, it was attended by Colonel Tadeusz Lecki ("Krogulec"), Colonel Zygmunt Bartkowski ("Zygmunt") and Colonel Waclaw Borowiec ("Niegolewski"). As it turned out, rebel forces were inadequate for such a large action, and Heda obliged all officers to inform him by 20 July about the number of available soldiers.

Soon after the meeting, Heda approached two officers of Radom District of the Home Army: Colonel Stefanem Bembiński ("Harnas") and Colonel Henryk Podkowinski ("Ostrolot"). With permission of Major Zygmunt Zywocki of Radom Home Army Inspectorate, both officers pledged to support the raid. Bembiński promised 50 soldiers, Ostrolot, 30.

== The Plan ==
Due to hard work and observation skills of Colonel Wlodzimierz Dalewski, a precise and effective plan was drafted. In its initial phase, all forces were to be concentrated and armed. All trucks and vehicles on the road from Kielce to Skarżysko were to be confiscated, to be used to transport the rebels. Heda divided all men into two groups:

- assault group of 40 volunteers and commanded by Dalewski, which was to carry out the raid and free all prisoners,
- protection group, divided into five subunits, located in different spots across the city.

On 20 July 1945, another meeting of officers took place in the village of Pogorzale. A report was handed to Heda: Colonel Zygmunt Bartkowski had some 40 men, Colonel Lecki 50, Colonel Dalewski 10, Colonel Borowiec – 15. Furthermore, 80 soldiers from Radom were to join the group. Altogether, the force numbered some 200 soldiers. This was inadequate, but Heda decided to carry out the raid.

Concentration of all units took place on 3 August 1945 in the forests near Bliżyn. As Heda later recalled, he ordered a mock attack on the town of Szydłowiec, some 50 kilometers to the north. As a result, the military garrison of Kielce left the city and headed to Szydłowiec.

== The Raid ==
On 4 August in the morning, all forces were divided into smaller groups, commanded by local officers from Kielce, who knew the city. Details of the plan were discussed, and a patrol of 10 soldiers commanded by Dalewski was sent to the road from Kielce to Skarżysko. Fourteen vehicles were confiscated, including military trucks. All drivers and passengers were led to the forest and kept under guard for the duration of the raid. After an investigation it turned out that among those captured on the road were four officers of Communist Służba Bezpieczeństwa from Kielce: Waclaw Gora, Zdzislaw Ciach, Zygmunt Zygula and Kazimierz Mikolajczak. All four were executed on the same day, at about 7 p.m.

The total force involved in the raid consisted of approximately 200 soldiers. They were armed with 20 machine guns, 130 submachine guns, grenades and explosives. The group loaded on trucks and other vehicles at approximately 9 p.m., on 4 August, and was planned to reach Kielce at 11 p.m. Due to several delays, all subunits arrived at Kielce before 11:30 p.m. The unit of Podkowinski took positions near Kielce Cathedral, to protect the raid from Sienkiewicza Street. The unit of Bembiński was located in the city park, together with 40 men of Wojciechowski. The fourth unit, under Bartkowski, controlled the evacuation route, and prepared lodgings in the village of Zagorze near Kielce. Lastly, the fifth unit under command of Borowiec seized the main post office, in order to cut off telephone connections.

The raid turned out to be a success for the Cursed Soldiers, as they managed to release 354 political prisoners. The rebels lost only one man, while the Communists lost one Red Army officer and one officer of Milicja Obywatelska, and also the four officers of the Służba Bezpieczeństwa mentioned previously. The whole raid lasted less than two hours, and among those released were members of anti-Communist resistance who had already been sentenced to death. Immediately after the raid, Communist authorities, supported by the NKVD, began to search for the rebels.

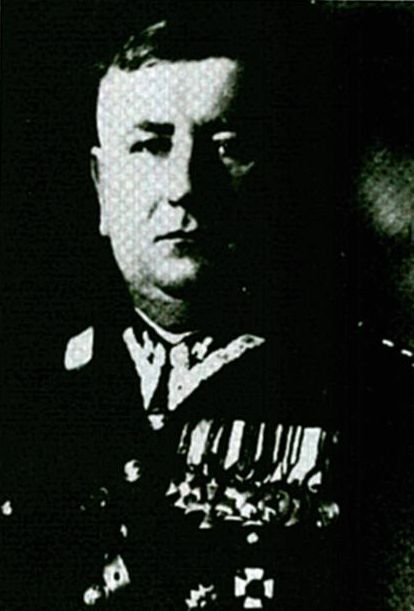
Lieutenant colonel Antoni Żółkiewski

Among those freed on that night were:

- Lieutenant colonel Antoni Żółkiewski (pl) nom-de-guerre Lin, Commander of the 2nd Infantry Division "Pogoń" of the AK Legions awaiting prison execution in Kielce. Weakened by interrogations, he died of a heart failure, already freed during the raid.
- Colonel Michał Mandziara "Siwy",
- Captain Józef Wyrwa "Stary",
- Colonel Ludwik Wiechula "Jelen",
- Stanisław Kosicki.

== See also ==
- Anti-communist resistance in Poland (1944–46)
- Soviet invasion of Poland
- Soviet repressions of Polish citizens (1939–46)
- Attack on the NKVD Camp in Rembertów
- Battle of Kuryłówka

== Notes and references ==
- Ryszard Śmietanka-Kruszelnicki, Marcin Sołtysiak, Rozbicie więzienia w Kielcach w nocy z 4 na 5 sierpnia 1945 r. Instytut Pamięci Narodowej – Komisja Ścigania Zbrodni przeciwko Narodowi Polskiemu Oddział w Krakowie
