= Gaworzyna =

- Village
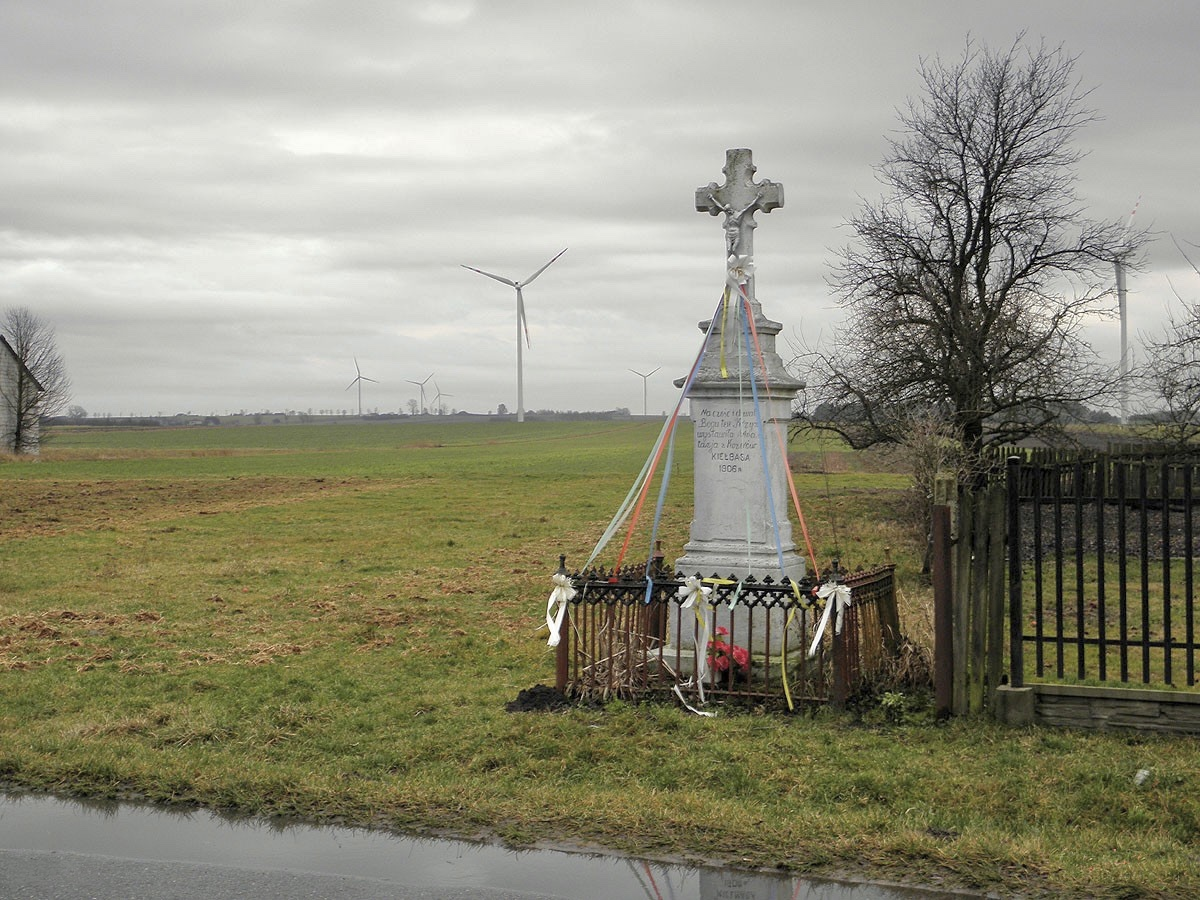
- Wayside cross in Gaworzyna. Wind turbines in the distance.

- Location within Poland
- Coordinates: 51°12′17″N 21°12′19″E
- Country: Poland
- Voivodeship: Masovian
- County: Radom
- Gmina: Iłża

Gaworzyna [ɡavɔˈʐɨna] is a village in the administrative district of Gmina Iłża, within Radom County, Masovian Voivodeship, in east-central Poland.
