= Jasieniec-Maziarze =

- Village
- Location within Poland
- Coordinates: 51°6′28″N 21°11′34″E
- Country: Poland
- Voivodeship: Masovian
- County: Radom
- Gmina: Iłża

Jasieniec-Maziarze [jaˈɕɛɲɛt͡s maˈʑaʐɛ] is a village in the administrative district of Gmina Iłża, within Radom County, Masovian Voivodeship, in east-central Poland.
