= Walentynów, Radom County =

Walentynów
- Village
- Location within Poland
- Coordinates: 51°13′6″N 21°14′29″E
- Country: Poland
- Voivodeship: Masovian
- County: Radom
- Gmina: Iłża

Walentynów [valɛnˈtɨnuf] is a village in the administrative district of Gmina Iłża, within Radom County, Masovian Voivodeship, in east-central Poland.
