= Błaziny Górne =

- Village
- Location within Poland
- Coordinates: 51°8′13″N 21°15′4″E
- Country: Poland
- Voivodeship: Masovian
- County: Radom
- Gmina: Iłża
- Population: 373

Błaziny Górne [bwaˈʑinɨ ˈɡurnɛ] is a village in the administrative district of Gmina Iłża, within Radom County, Masovian Voivodeship, in east-central Poland.
