= 3rd Legions Infantry Division =

Unit of the Polish Army between the World Wars

Polish 3rd Legions Infantry Division (3. Dywizja Piechoty Legionów) was a tactical unit of the Polish Army between the World Wars. Formed in 1919, as a third unit composed significantly of veterans of the Polish Legions in World War I (after Polish 1st Legions Infantry Division and Polish 2nd Legions Infantry Division), it saw extensive action during the Polish-Bolshevik War and the Invasion of Poland. In the interbellum period, the headquarters of the division was stationed in Zamość, while its regiments were garrisoned in Chelm, Lublin, Zamosc and other locations.

The division was officially formed on April 9, 1919, in former Austrian Galicia, during the ongoing Polish-Ukrainian War. At the beginning it consisted of three regiments (7th Legions Infantry, 8th Legions Infantry and 3rd Legions Light Artillery), but was later reinforced with 9th Infantry Regiment.

== The Division in September 1939 ==
In accordance with Polish mobilization plan (see Plan West), the division, commanded by Colonel Marian Turkowski, was to form main force of southern group of Prusy Army. On September 3, 1939, its first battalions detrained in the area of Radom - Jedlnia. Since divisional headquarters was still on the way to the concentration point, these battalions were temporarily commanded by General Gustaw Paszkiewicz of the 12th Infantry Division.

After concentration, the division was sent to defend the positions along the Krasna river, near Samsonow and Krasna. Several battalions were unable to reach their positions.

In the morning of September 6, 1939, German 3rd Light Division attacked. The enemy was divided into two columns, advancing from Mniow towards Samsonow and Krasna. First German assault was repelled, but after a few hours, the enemy attacked again, supported by its artillery. At app. 2 pm, retreat was ordered, as Polish positions were exposed and there was a danger of encirclement. After the Germans had captured Krasna, Poles withdrew along forest roads towards Radom. During the morning battle, the Germans lost 103 KIA and app. 15 tanks and armoured carriers. Polish losses were 33 KIA.

Since German armoured forces succeeded in breaking Polish positions and quickly advanced, General Stanislaw Skwarczynski ordered all units to withdraw behind the Vistula river. The crossing was to take place in several stages, with final stage taking place on the bridge at Solec nad Wisla, on September 10.

In the night of September 7/8, the Third Legions Division, together with elements of the 12th Division, marched northwards, to Ilza. The defence of the town was given to the 7th Regiment, supported by light artillery. Other regiments were located in the nearby villages, while 12th Division took positions in the forests near Starachowice. Meanwhile, German 1st Light Division advanced along the road from Konskie to Radom and Kozienice. On September 9, the Germans captured river crossing at Maciejowice, and concentrated near Radom.

South of Polish group, German divisions also advanced, hoping to encircle the Poles. These Wehrmacht units, however, consisted mostly of infantry, which was much slower than motorized regiments. On September 6, the Germans captured Ostrowiec Swietokrzyski, and two days later, Skarzysko-Kamienna, advancing then towards Szydlowiec in an attempt to divide the Poles into two groups. On September 9, a regiment of German tanks surprised the headquarters of the 3rd Legions Division, which at that time was located south of the village of Seredzice. After a bloody clash, the enemy was repelled.

7th Legions Infantry Regiment, stationed in Ilza, was attacked by tanks of the 3rd Light Division. After losing three tanks, the Germans regrouped and assaulted again, with artillery support. At app. 1700 Polish soldiers began to abandon their positions under heavy artillery fire. German infantry then entered the battle, in support of the tanks. Due to quick reaction of Polish officers, the crisis was overcome and Ilza remained in Polish hands.

Following the plan, elements of Polish 3rd and 12th Infantry Divisions prepared for the march to the forests between Ilza and Lipsko. To disorient the enemy, 8th Legions Regiment carried out a successful attack on German positions at Trebowiec Duzy. In the evening of September 9, commandant of the 3rd Legions Division formed an assault group, tasked with opening the route for the retreating units. The group consisted of 1st Battalion of the 7th Regiment and 1st Battalion of the 9th Regiment, supported by two artillery batteries. Its task was to remove German elements from the road Lipsko - Ilza. The attack began at 2030, but Polish soldiers were immediately sprayed by machine gun fire from German positions on the local hills. Nevertheless, the Poles advanced, reaching the headquarters of German 9th Motorized Infantry Regiment, whose commandant was killed in battle. Soon afterwards, however, several Polish soldiers and officers were killed by German machine guns.

Despite numerous attempts, Polish assault failed, and at app. 9 pm, soldiers of the 9th Legions Regiment returned to their starting positions. German losses amounted to 4 tanks, unknown number of vehicles and motorcycles, as well as several KIA and WIA.

After the clash, elements of the 3rd Legions Division were ordered to try to break through German positions and reach Solec nad Wisla. Polish soldiers, in groups of app. 300, concentrated in local forests, but the division as such ceased to exist. Those who managed to cross the Vistula joined 1st Legions Infantry Division, and fought in the Battle of Tomaszow Lubelski. Other soldiers joined the unit of Colonel Stanislaw Gumowski, which was part of Polish Northern Front (1939), and fought near Krasnystaw.

In mid-September 1939, some 500 reservists of the 3rd Division were sent to Kowel, where new units were formed. When news of the Soviet invasion of Poland reached the town, the soldiers were ordered to break to Hungary on their own.

== Order of Battle of the 3rd Legions Infantry Division in September 1939 ==
- Headquarters of the Division, stationed in Zamosc: Colonel Marian Turkowski, Commandant of Divisional Infantry Colonel Jan Korkozowicz, Commandant of Divisional Artillery Colonel Stanislaw Tatar, Staff Officer Major Jan Szczurek-Cergowski, Chief of Staff Colonel Henryk Sobolewski.
- 7th Legions' Infantry Regiment from Chelm, Colonel Wladyslaw Muzyka,
- 8th Legions' Infantry Regiment from Lublin, Colonel Antoni Cebulski,
- 9th Legions' Infantry Regiment from Zamosc, Colonel Zygmunt Alojzy Bierowski,
- 3rd Legions Light Artillery Regiment from Zamosc, Colonel Tomasz Nowakowski
- other units, such as 3rd Battalion of Heavy Artillery (Chelm), 3rd Sapper Battalion, Battery of Motor Antiaircraft Artillery, Telephone Company, Cavalry Squadron, Independent Company of Machine Guns, Company of Cyclists, Platoon of Military Police, Field Court.

== Other 3rd Infantry Divisions of Poland ==
There were at least four other 3rd Infantry Divisions in Polish twentieth century military history. There was a 3rd Infantry Division which attained partially formed status with the Polish Army in France (1939–1940), there was the 3rd Carpathian Rifle Division served with II Corps (Poland), Polish Armed Forces in the West, the 3rd Infantry Division of the Home Army, and another 3rd Infantry Division (pl:3 Pomorska Dywizja Piechoty) served with the First Army, Soviet-controlled Polish Armed Forces in the East. This division fought at the Battle of Kolberg (1945). In 1962 it became the 3rd Mechanised Division.

== Sources ==
- Jan Wróblewski. Armia Prusy, Warszawa 1986.
- Zdzisław Jagiełło: Piechota Wojska Polskiego 1918–1939. Warszawa: Bellona, 2007.

== See also ==
- Polish army order of battle in 1939
- Polish contribution to World War II
- List of Polish divisions in World War II
