= Alojzów, Masovian Voivodeship =

Alojzów
- Village
- Location within Poland
- Coordinates: 51°13′12″N 21°15′20″E
- Country: Poland
- Voivodeship: Masovian
- County: Radom
- Gmina: Iłża
- Population: 161

Alojzów (Polish pronunciation: [aˈlɔjzuf]) is a village in the administrative district of Gmina Iłża, within Radom County, Masovian Voivodeship, in east-central Poland.
