= Kolonia Seredzice =

- Village
- Location within Poland
- Coordinates: 51°8′54″N 21°13′3″E
- Country: Poland
- Voivodeship: Masovian
- County: Radom
- Gmina: Iłża

Kolonia Seredzice [kɔˈlɔɲa sɛrɛˈd͡ʑit͡sɛ] is a village in the administrative district of Gmina Iłża, within Radom County, Masovian Voivodeship, in east-central Poland.
