= Florencja, Radom County =

Florencja
- Village
- Location within Poland
- Coordinates: 51°12′20″N 21°15′56″E
- Country: Poland
- Voivodeship: Masovian
- County: Radom
- Gmina: Iłża

Florencja (Polish pronunciation: [flɔˈrɛnt͡sja]) is a village in the administrative district of Gmina Iłża, within Radom County, Masovian Voivodeship, in east-central Poland.
