= Koszary, Radom County =

Koszary
- Village
- Location within Poland
- Coordinates: 51°6′57″N 21°14′28″E
- Country: Poland
- Voivodeship: Masovian
- County: Radom
- Gmina: Iłża

Koszary [kɔˈʂarɨ] is a village in the administrative district of Gmina Iłża, within Radom County, Masovian Voivodeship, in east-central Poland.
