= Gmina Iłża =

Gmina Iłża Iłża Commune
- Gmina
- Coat of arms
- Interactive map of Gmina Iłża
- Coordinates (Iłża): 51°10′N 21°15′E
- Country: Poland
- Voivodeship: Masovian
- County: Radom County
- Seat: Iłża

Area
  - Total: 255.82 km^{2} (98.77 sq mi)

Population (2006)
  - Total: 15,624
  - Density: 61.074/km^{2} (158.18/sq mi)
  - Urban: 5,165
  - Rural: 10,459

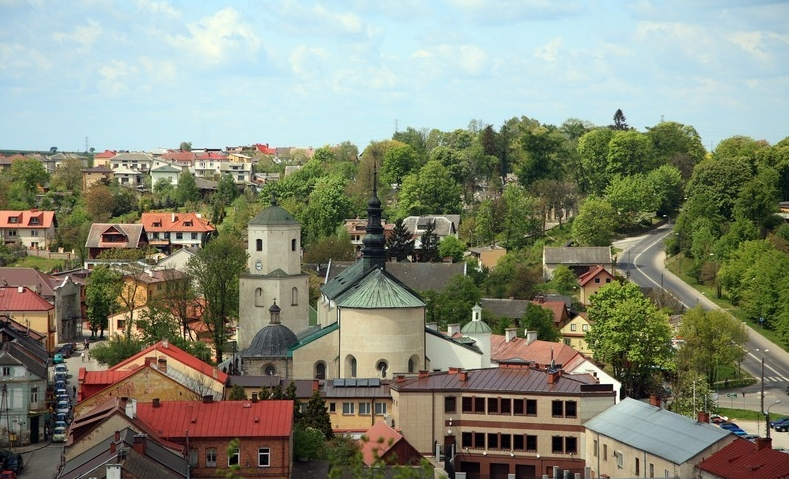
Iłża

Gmina Iłża is an urban-rural gmina (administrative district) in Radom County, Masovian Voivodeship, in east-central Poland. Its seat is the town of Iłża, which lies approximately 27 kilometres (17 mi) south of Radom and 118 km (73 mi) south of Warsaw.

The gmina covers an area of 255.82 square kilometres (98.8 sq mi), and as of 2006 its total population is 15,624 (out of which the population of Iłża amounts to 5,165, and the population of the rural part of the gmina is 10,459).

== Villages ==
Apart from the town of Iłża, Gmina Iłża contains the villages and settlements of Alojzów, Białka, Błaziny Dolne, Błaziny Górne, Chwałowice, Florencja, Gaworzyna, Jasieniec Iłżecki Dolny, Jasieniec Iłżecki Górny, Jasieniec-Maziarze, Jedlanka Nowa, Jedlanka Stara, Kajetanów, Kolonia Seredzice, Koszary, Kotlarka, Krzyżanowice, Małomierzyce, Maziarze Nowe, Maziarze Stare, Michałów, Nowy Jasieniec Iłżecki, Pakosław, Pastwiska, Pieńki, Piłatka, Piotrowe Pole, Płudnica, Prędocin, Prędocin-Kolonia, Seredzice, Seredzice-Zawodzie, Starosiedlice and Walentynów.

== Neighbouring gminas ==
Gmina Iłża is bordered by the gminas of Brody, Ciepielów, Kazanów, Mirzec, Rzeczniów, Skaryszew and Wierzbica.
