= Starosiedlice =

- Village
- Location within Poland
- Coordinates: 51°11′N 21°13′E
- Country: Poland
- Voivodeship: Masovian
- County: Radom
- Gmina: Iłża
- Population: 289 (2,009)

Starosiedlice [starɔɕɛdˈlit͡sɛ] is a village in the administrative district of Gmina Iłża, within Radom County, Masovian Voivodeship, in east-central Poland.
