= Błaziny Dolne =

Village in Masovian Voivodeship, Poland

- Village
- Location within Poland
- Coordinates: 51°8′1″N 21°14′28″E
- Country: Poland
- Voivodeship: Masovian
- County: Radom
- Gmina: Iłża
- Population: 412

Błaziny Dolne [bwaˈʑinɨ ˈdɔlnɛ] is a village in the administrative district of Gmina Iłża, within Radom County, Masovian Voivodeship, in east-central Poland.
