= Pastwiska, Masovian Voivodeship =

Pastwiska
- Village
- Location within Poland
- Coordinates: 51°7′2″N 21°13′41″E
- Country: Poland
- Voivodeship: Masovian
- County: Radom
- Gmina: Iłża
- Population: 200

Pastwiska [pastˈfʲiska] is a village in the administrative district of Gmina Iłża, within Radom County, Masovian Voivodeship, in east-central Poland.
