= Seredzice-Zawodzie =

- Village
- Location within Poland
- Coordinates: 51°8′47″N 21°11′9″E
- Country: Poland
- Voivodeship: Masovian
- County: Radom
- Gmina: Iłża

Seredzice-Zawodzie [sɛrɛˈd͡ʑit͡sɛ zaˈvɔd͡ʑɛ] is a village in the administrative district of Gmina Iłża, within Radom County, Masovian Voivodeship, in east-central Poland.
