= Płudnica =

- Village
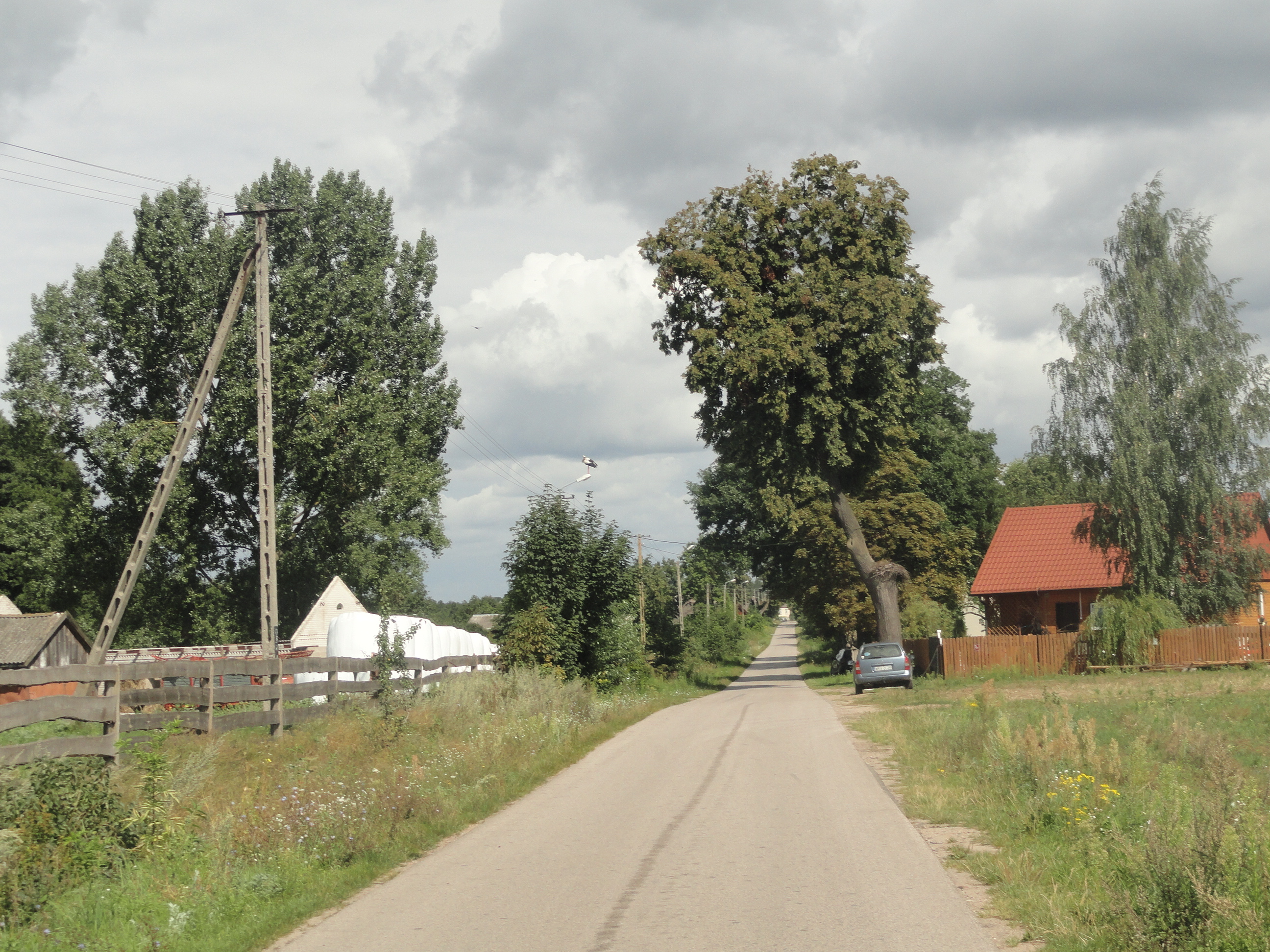

- Location within Poland
- Coordinates: 51°14′N 21°12′E
- Country: Poland
- Voivodeship: Masovian
- County: Radom
- Gmina: Iłża

Płudnica [pwudˈnit͡sa] is a rural village in the administrative district of Gmina Iłża, within Radom County, Masovian Voivodeship, in east-central Poland. It contains the hamlet of Trupienie.

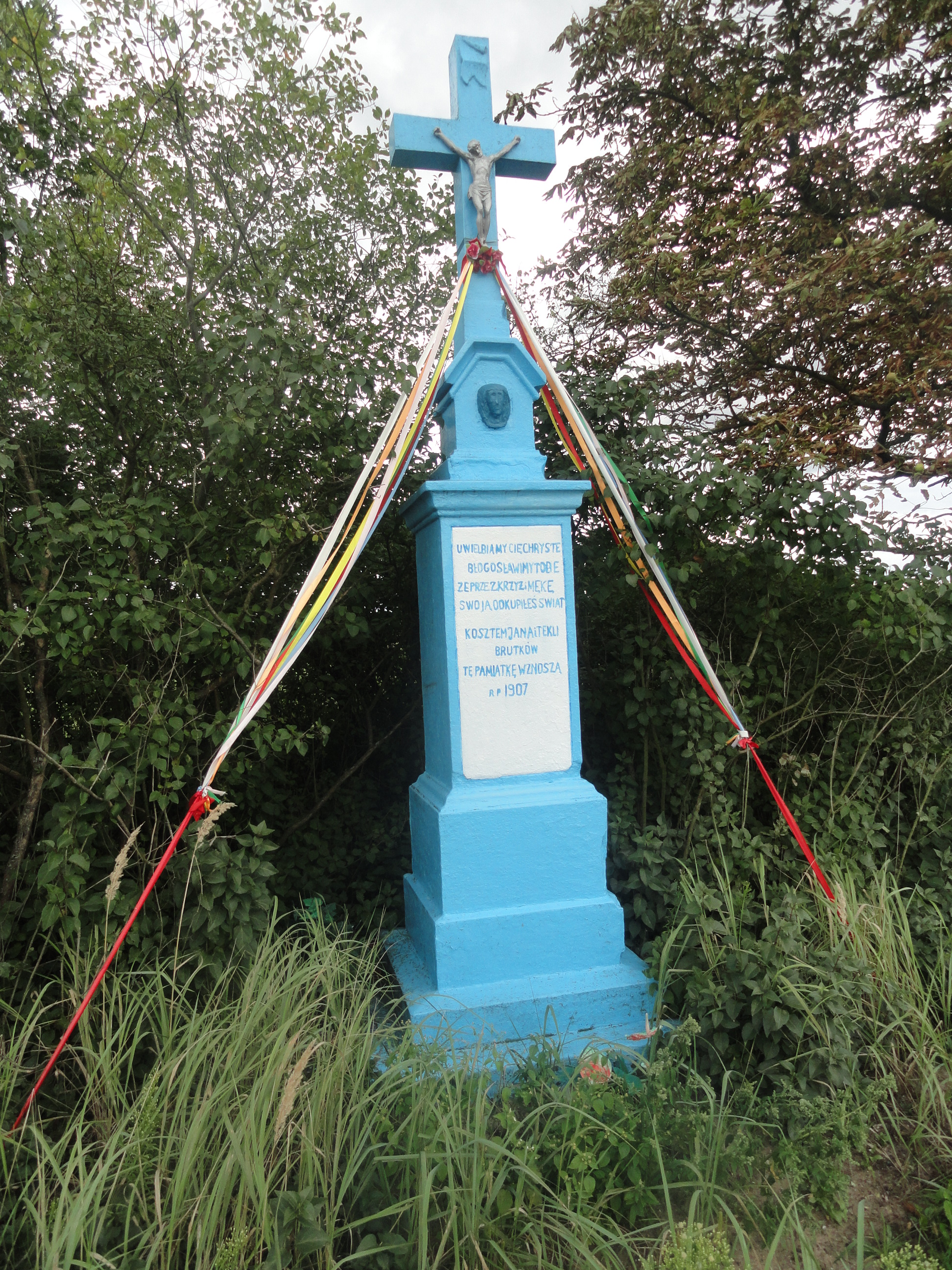
Wayside cross in Płudnica
