= Nowy Jasieniec Iłżecki =

- Village
- Location within Poland
- Coordinates: 51°7′7″N 21°12′36″E
- Country: Poland
- Voivodeship: Masovian
- County: Radom
- Gmina: Iłża

Nowy Jasieniec Iłżecki [ˈnɔvɨ jaˈɕɛɲɛt͡s iu̯ˈʐɛt͡ski] is a village in the administrative district of Gmina Iłża, within Radom County, Masovian Voivodeship, in east-central Poland.
