= Maziarze Stare =

- Village
- Location within Poland
- Coordinates: 51°7′54″N 21°18′6″E
- Country: Poland
- Voivodeship: Masovian
- County: Radom
- Gmina: Iłża

Maziarze Stare [maˈʑaʐɛ ˈstarɛ] is a village in the administrative district of Gmina Iłża, within Radom County, Masovian Voivodeship, in east-central Poland.
