= Jedlanka Stara =

- Village
- Location within Poland
- Coordinates: 51°11′58″N 21°16′59″E
- Country: Poland
- Voivodeship: Masovian
- County: Radom
- Gmina: Iłża

Jedlanka Stara [jɛˈdlanka ˈstara] is a village in the administrative district of Gmina Iłża, within Radom County, Masovian Voivodeship, in east-central Poland.
