= Piłatka, Masovian Voivodeship =

Piłatka
- Village
- Location within Poland
- Coordinates: 51°9′48″N 21°16′36″E
- Country: Poland
- Voivodeship: Masovian
- County: Radom
- Gmina: Iłża

Piłatka [piˈwatka] is a village in the administrative district of Gmina Iłża, within Radom County, Masovian Voivodeship, in east-central Poland.
