= Kotlarka, Masovian Voivodeship =

Kotlarka
- Village
- Location within Poland
- Coordinates: 51°8′38″N 21°17′20″E
- Country: Poland
- Voivodeship: Masovian
- County: Radom
- Gmina: Iłża

Kotlarka [kɔˈtlarka] is a village in the administrative district of Gmina Iłża, within Radom County, Masovian Voivodeship, in east-central Poland.
