= Krzyżanowice, Masovian Voivodeship =

Krzyżanowice
- Village
- Location within Poland
- Coordinates: 51°11′40″N 21°14′3″E
- Country: Poland
- Voivodeship: Masovian
- County: Radom
- Gmina: Iłża

Krzyżanowice [kʂɨʐanɔˈvit͡sɛ] is a village in the administrative district of Gmina Iłża, within Radom County, Masovian Voivodeship, in east-central Poland.
