= 9th Legions' Infantry Regiment =

9th Legions Infantry Regiment (Polish: 9 Pulk Piechoty Legionow, 9 pp Leg.) was an infantry regiment of the Polish Army. It existed from 1918 until 1939. Garrisoned in Zamość, and belonged to the 3rd Legions Infantry Division from Zamość.

During the 1939 Invasion of Poland, the 9th Regiment (without its 1st Battalion) belonged to the reserve 39th Infantry Division. Commanded by General Bruno Olbrycht, this division was part of Prusy Army. The 1st Battalion of the 9th Regiment was part of the 12th Infantry Division.

The history of the unit dates back to early November 1918, when the 3rd Infantry Regiment of Polska Siła Zbrojna was formed in Komorow near Ostrów Mazowiecka. Soon after its creation, the regiment took part in disarming German soldiers, stationed in the area (see Ober Ost). On February 16, 1919, the unit was renamed into the 9th Legions Infantry Regiment.

In the Second Polish Republic, the regiment was stationed in Zamość, with its 3rd Battalion garrisoned in Tomaszów Lubelski, and belonged to the elite 3rd Legions Infantry Division. It celebrated its holiday on Jule 29.

Regimental flag, funded by the residents of Zamość, was handed to it by Józef Piłsudski, in Zamość on October 17, 1922. The badge, approved in 1928, was in the shape of the Cross of Valour, with the inscription 9 P.P.LEG. 1918.

Among the commandants of the regiment were such names, as Mieczysław Smorawiński (1919), Wacław Scaevola-Wieczorkiewicz (1920), and Stanisław Sosabowski (January 1937 – March 1939).

== Sources ==
- Kazimierz Satora: Opowieści wrześniowych sztandarów. Warszawa: Instytut Wydawniczy Pax, 1990
- Zdzisław Jagiełło: Piechota Wojska Polskiego 1918–1939. Warszawa: Bellona, 2007

== See also ==
- 1939 Infantry Regiment (Poland)
