= Michałów, Radom County =

Michałów
- Village
- Location within Poland
- Coordinates: 51°10′30″N 21°8′33″E
- Country: Poland
- Voivodeship: Masovian
- County: Radom
- Gmina: Iłża

Michałów [miˈxawuf] is a village in the administrative district of Gmina Iłża, within Radom County, Masovian Voivodeship, in east-central Poland.
