= Seredzice =

- Village
- Location within Poland
- Coordinates: 51°9′N 21°11′E
- Country: Poland
- Voivodeship: Masovian
- County: Radom
- Gmina: Iłża

Seredzice [sɛrɛˈd͡ʑit͡sɛ] is a village in the administrative district of Gmina Iłża, within Radom County, Masovian Voivodeship, in east-central Poland.
