= Małomierzyce =

- Village
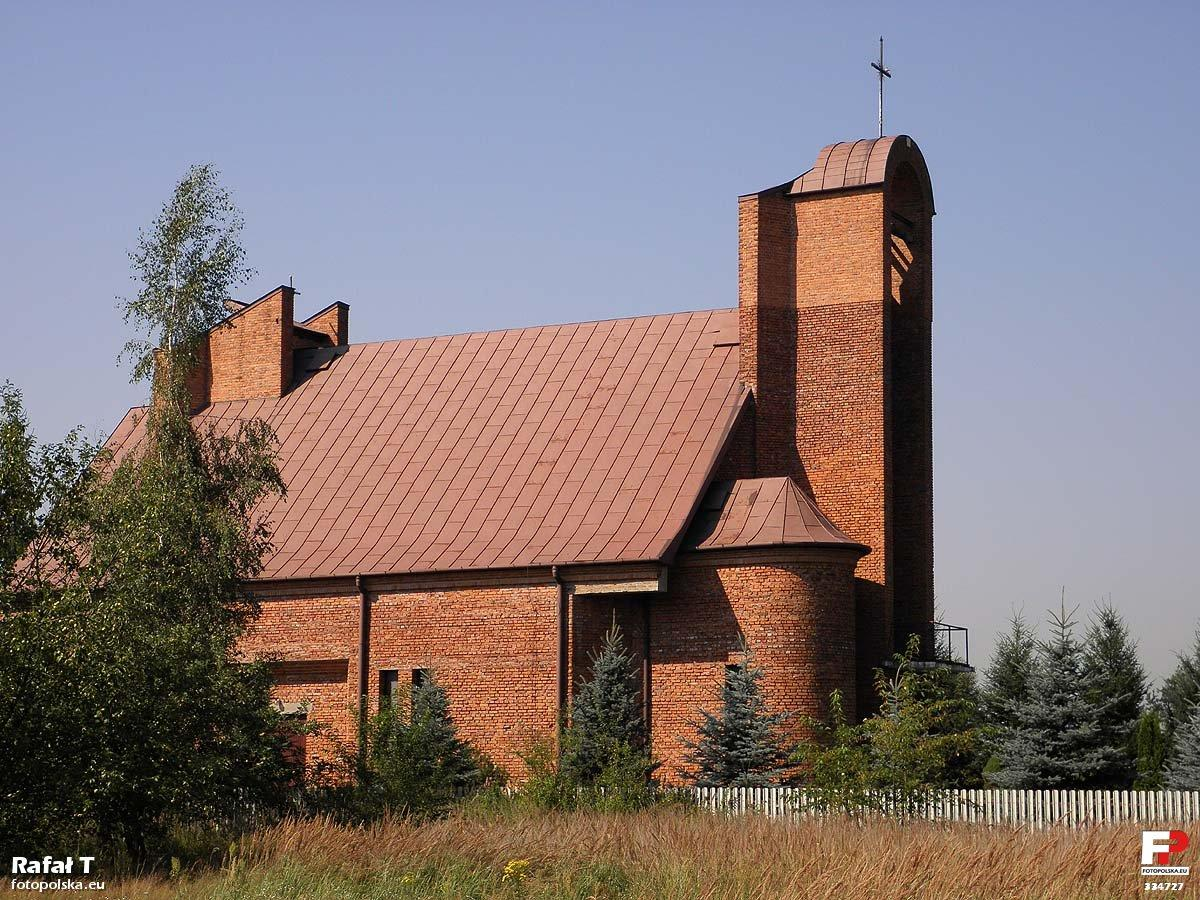
- Catholic church in Małomierzyce

- Location within Poland
- Coordinates: 51°11′50″N 21°20′11″E
- Country: Poland
- Voivodeship: Masovian
- County: Radom
- Gmina: Iłża

Małomierzyce [mawɔmjɛˈʐɨt͡sɛ] is a village in the administrative district of Gmina Iłża, within Radom County, Masovian Voivodeship, in east-central Poland.
