= Prędocin, Masovian Voivodeship =

Prędocin
- Village
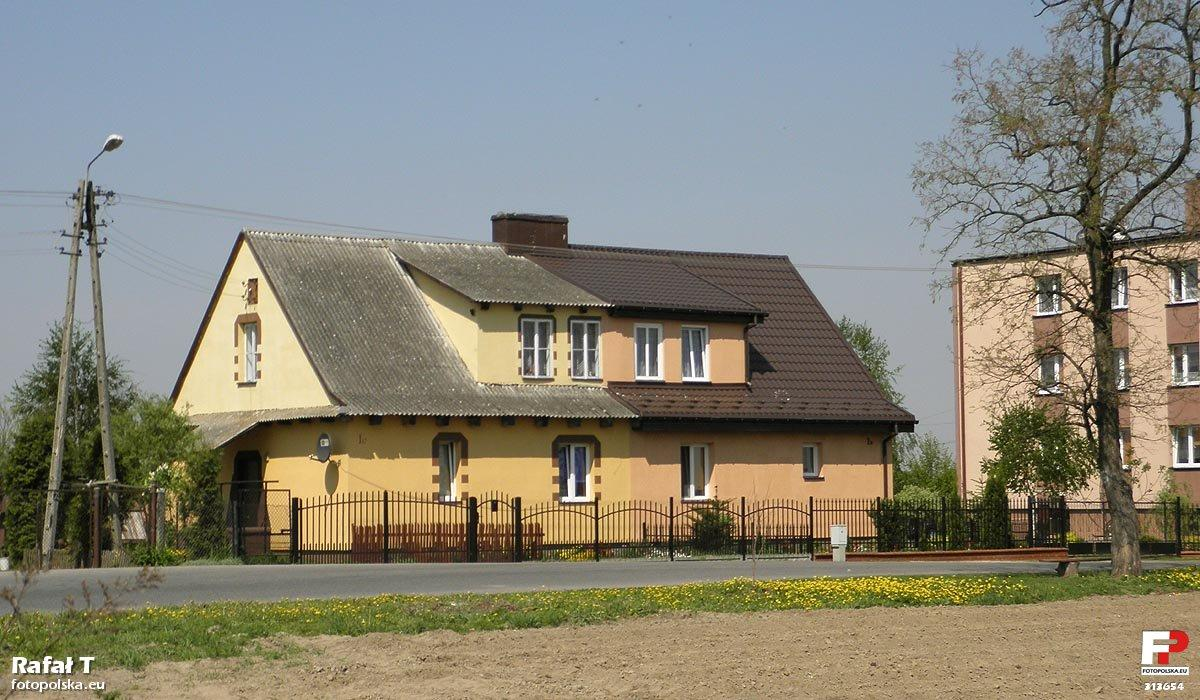
- Old house in Prędocin

- Location within Poland
- Coordinates: 51°8′50″N 21°19′30″E
- Country: Poland
- Voivodeship: Masovian
- County: Radom
- Gmina: Iłża
- Time zone: UTC+1 (CET)
  - Summer (DST): UTC+2 (CEST)
- Vehicle registration: WRA

Prędocin [prɛnˈdɔt͡ɕin] is a village in the administrative district of Gmina Iłża, within Radom County, Masovian Voivodeship, in east-central Poland.
