= Iłża =

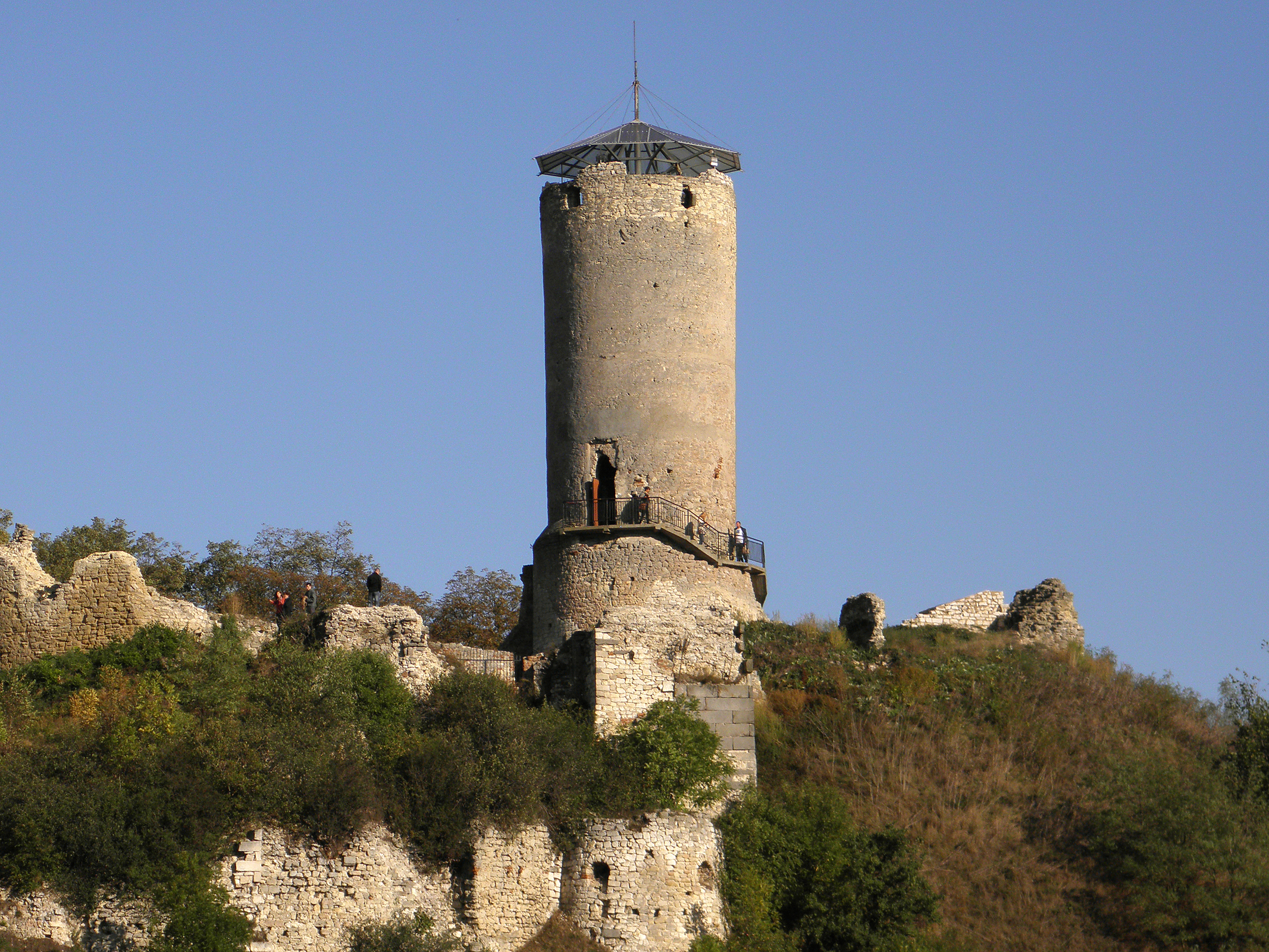
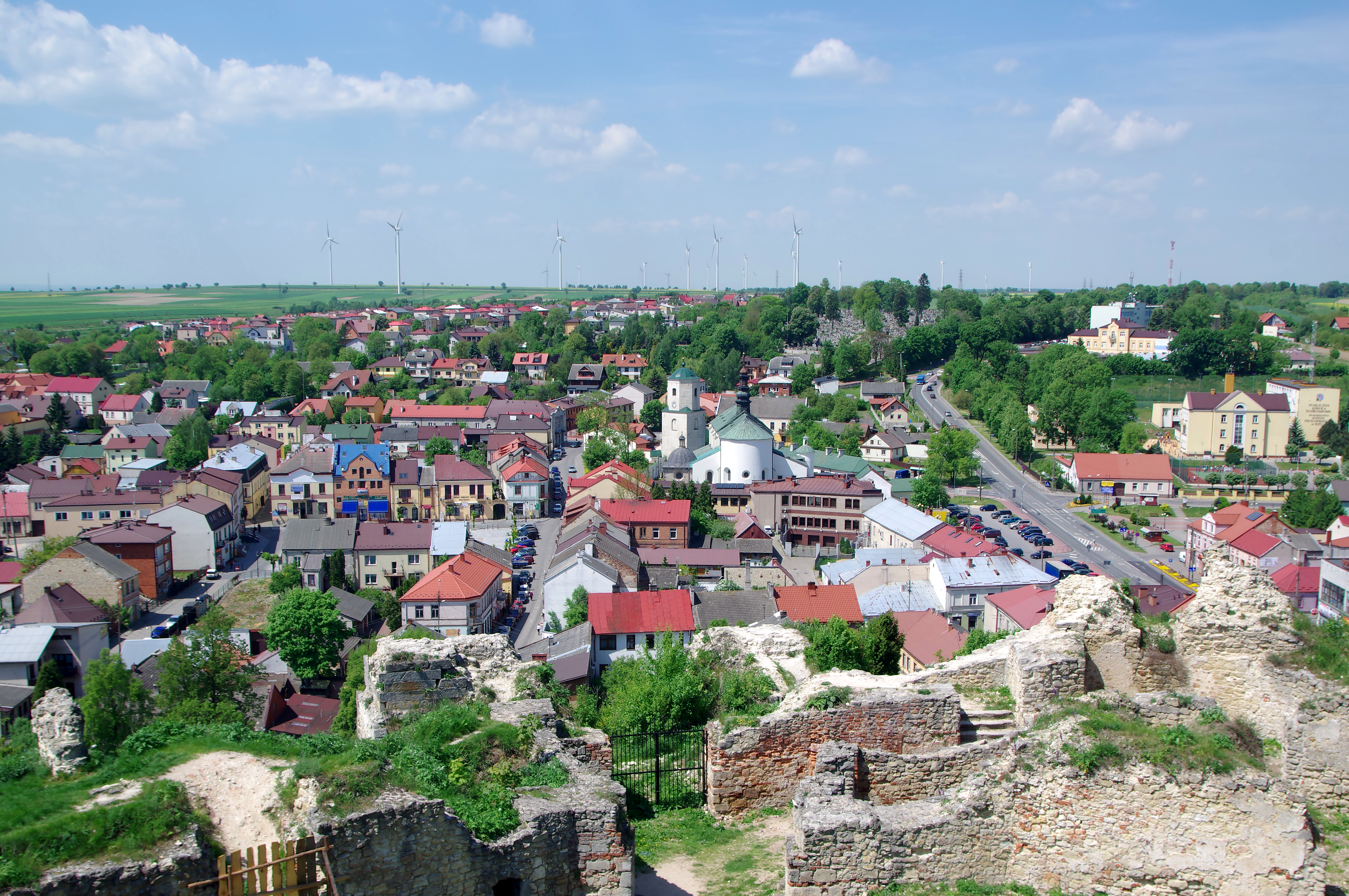
- Iłża castle and view of the town

- Flag Coat of arms

- Location within Poland
- Coordinates: 51°10′N 21°15′E
- Country: Poland
- Voivodeship: Masovian
- County: Radom
- Gmina: Iłża
- Town rights: 1239

Government
  - Mayor: Marek Łuszczek

Area
  - Total: 15.83 km^{2} (6.11 sq mi)

Population (2006)
  - Total: 5,165
  - Density: 326.3/km^{2} (845.1/sq mi)
- Time zone: UTC+1 (CET)
  - Summer (DST): UTC+2 (CEST)
- Postal code: 27-100
- Area code: +48 48
- Car plates: WRA
- Website: http://www.ilza.pl/

Iłża ([ˈiu̯ʐa]) is a small town in Masovian Voivodeship, Poland. In 2006 Iłża had approximately 5,165 inhabitants. The town belongs to the historical region of Lesser Poland, and from its foundation until 1795, it was part of Lesser Poland’s Sandomierz Voivodeship. Iłża lies in Małopolska Upland, on the Iłżanka river, 30 kilometers (19 miles) south of Radom.

Iłża is the northern terminus of the Starachowice Narrow Gauge Line (Starachowicka Kolej Wąskotorowa), a 20-kilometer (12 miles) line built in the early 1950s, which now is open for tourists in the summer.

== History ==
The history of the town dates back to the early Middle Ages, when it was a Western Slavic gord. Since the 12th century, until 1789, Iłża belonged to the Catholic Bishops of Kraków. The settlement was twice destroyed by the Mongols (1241, 1260) during the first and second Mongol invasion of Poland. In around 1294 it received Magdeburg rights town charter. In 1340, a stone castle was built here by Bishop Jan Grot, which was expanded in the 15th and 16th centuries. In the 16th century, Iłża became famous for its potters and other artisans or craftsmen. The town prospered, together with whole Polish–Lithuanian Commonwealth. It was conveniently located on a merchant route from the heartland of Poland to the Vistula ports at Solec nad Wisłą, Zawichost, and Sandomierz. In 1576, a town hall was built at the main market square, Iłża had a defensive wall, and several Polish kings visited the castle. The decline of Iłża was brought by the Deluge (1655–1660), when Swedish and Transylvanian armies completely destroyed the town and the castle.

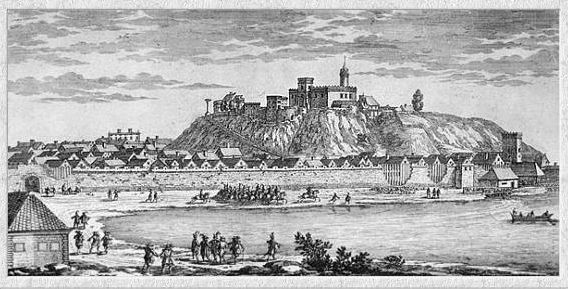
View of Iłża in 1655, by Erik Dahlberg

On July 17, 1789 Iłża ceased to be the property of the Bishops of Kraków, and became a state-owned town. Following the Third Partition of Poland, Iłża briefly belonged to the Austrian Empire (1795–1807), afterwards it was part of the short-lived Polish Duchy of Warsaw, and since 1815, it was part of Russian-controlled Congress Poland. The town suffered in the November Uprising (1831), and in 1850, a Jewish gmina was opened here. By 1857, Jews made up 26% of Iłża's total population. On January 17, 1864, during the January Uprising, a battle between Polish rebels and Russians took place here. In 1867, as a punishment for the uprising, Iłża lost its town charter and privileges and became a village. In 1870, a synagogue was built, and by 1897, 40% of the population was Jewish.

The village was once again destroyed in World War I (1915), and in 1918, the capital of the Iłża County (created 1866) was moved to Starachowice. In 1921, already in Kielce Voivodeship of the Second Polish Republic, Iłża regained its town charter. Throughout Invasion of Poland, the Battle of Iłża (also called Battle of Radom) took place here on September 8–9, 1939, in which Polish Prusy Army was defeated by the Wehrmacht. During the subsequent German occupation, Poles were subject to mass arrests, tortures, massacres and deportations. In March 1940, Germans carried out mass arrests of Poles, who were then either murdered in the village of Góry Wysokie or deported to Nazi concentration camps, and in June 1940, they carried out another wave of arrests of Poles, who were then imprisoned and tortured in Skarżysko-Kamienna, and afterwards murdered in the Brzask forest near Skarżysko-Kamienna. All Poles were a target of German brutality, and Polish Jews were a special target, being nearly wiped out completely. In Iłża in December 1941, Germans established a Jewish ghetto, whose 2000 residents were murdered at Treblinka extermination camp in October 1942. Polish police assisted in rounding them up for the deportation and searching the ghetto for those in hiding. The number of survivors is unknown.

Iłża was an important center of Polish resistance, with a unit of the Home Army (AK), and local headquarters of Bataliony Chłopskie. Furthermore, the Communist partisan force Armia Ludowa (AL) was active in the region; on May 16–17, 1944 its units took control of the town and on January 16, 1945 the Red Army entered Iłża.

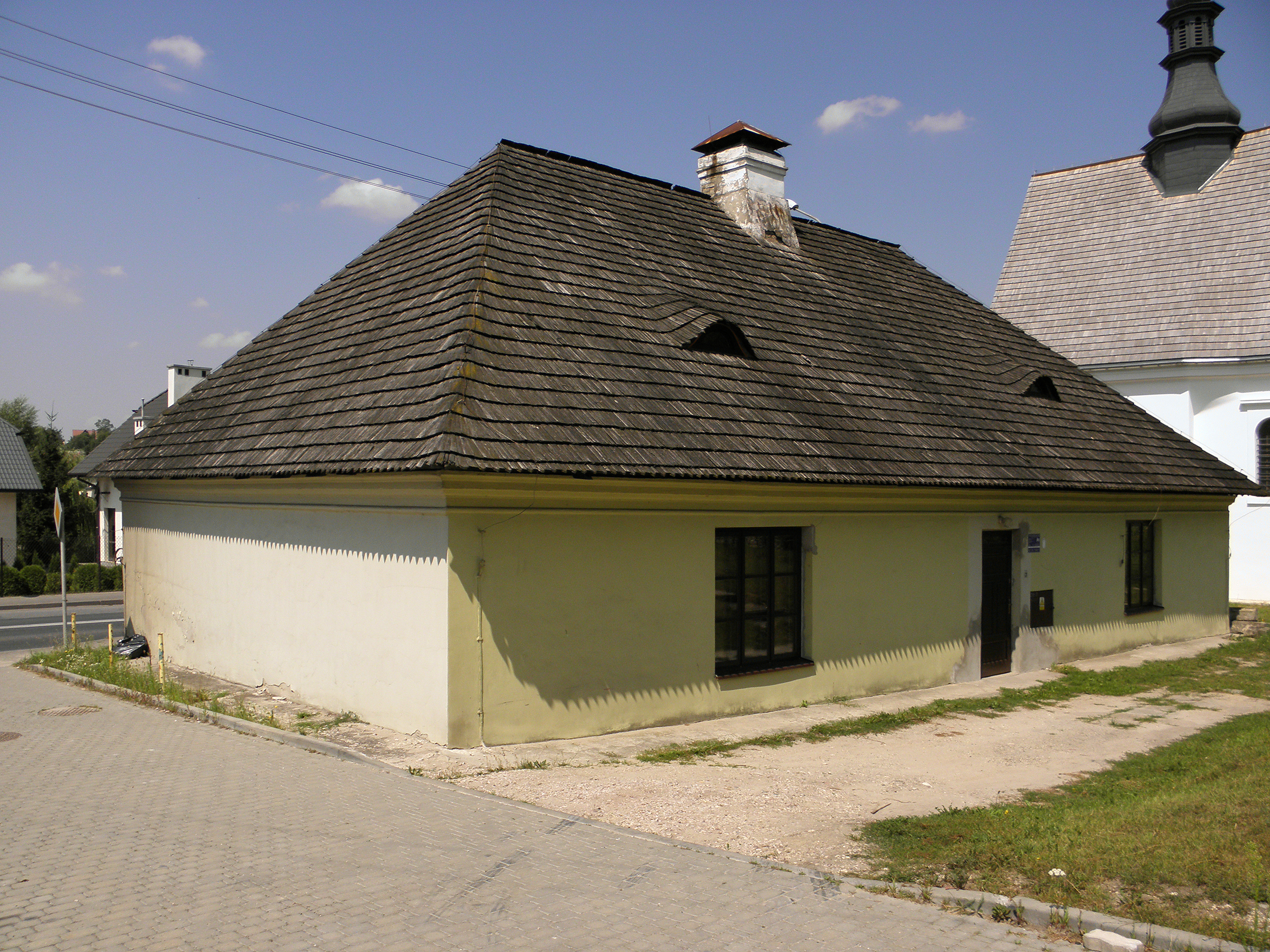
Former hospital from 1754, now a museum

Under the Polish People's Republic Iłża remained a small town, without an industry and located close to the quickly growing industrial center at Starachowice. Since the 14th century Iłża established a potter's guild and has been famous for its pottery. Particularly popular were figurines of birds, animals and people, based on keen observations of nature. Entire families participated in the industry each taking their own part in the production. In the 17th and 18th century great developments occurred when caravans of pottery were transported to Kraków and other Polish cities, from where barges would transport the ceramics on the Vistula River to Gdańsk, spreading the fame of the artists work. During the 19th century, Stanisław Kosiarski began his long tradition of production, until his death at the hands of the Nazis in 1939. The tradition was passed on to his students and daughter who continued to produce excellent ornamental pottery and build schools for young artists who could contribute to the art of Poland. Iłża now belongs to Masovian Voivodeship, even though it had never been part of the historical Masovia.

== Sights ==
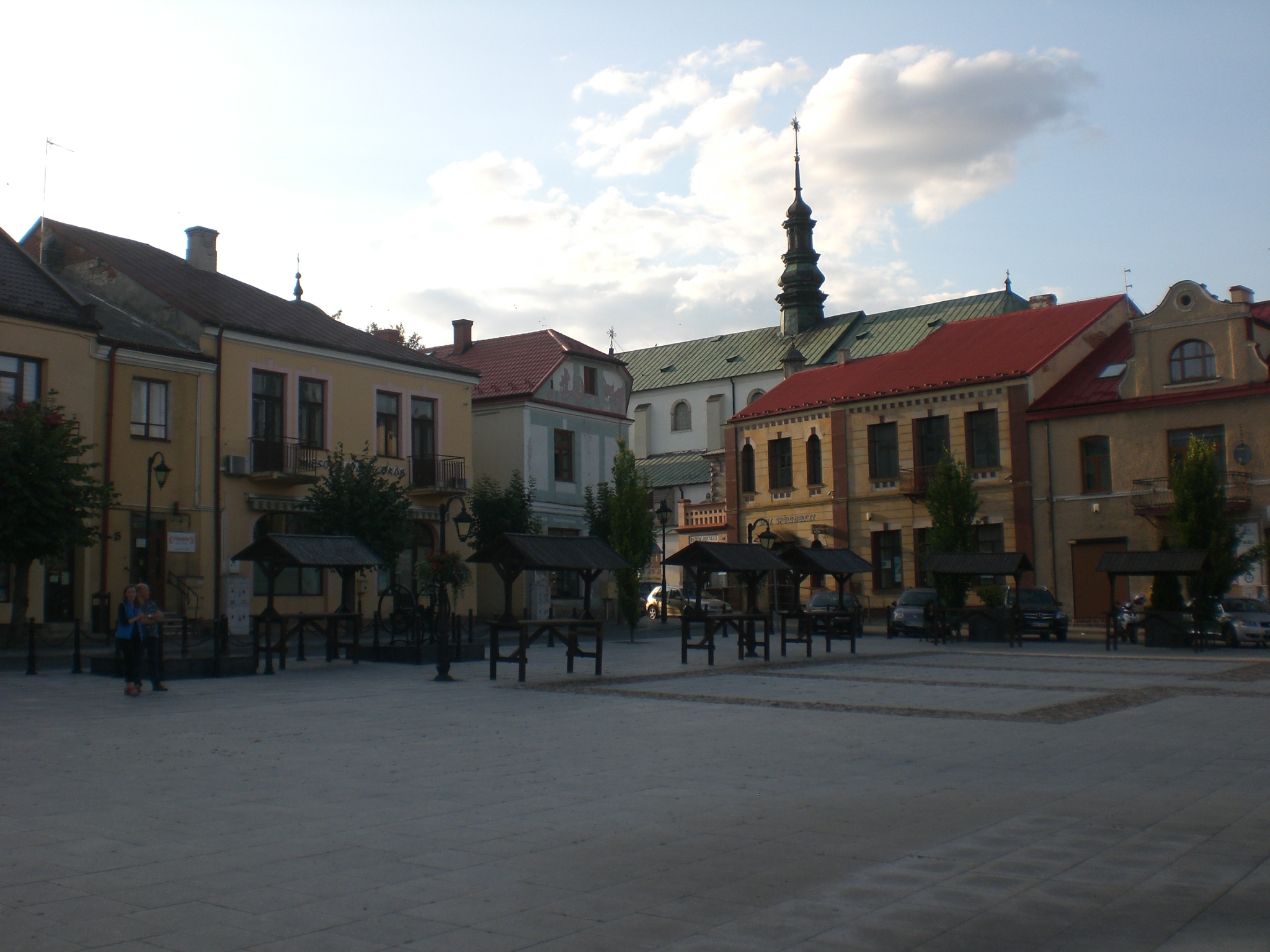
Rynek (market square), filled with historic townhouses, with the Gothic-Baroque Church of the Assumption in the background

Among local attractions are:

- remains of the castle built in 1340 by bishop Jan Grot, which in 1560s was turned into a Renaissance residence,
- parish church dating back to 1326, remodeled in 1603,
- remnants of Gothic buildings, such as round tower (late 13th century),
- Holy Spirit church (1448), rebuilt in 1922,
- parish cemetery (1832),
- Jewish cemetery from the 19th century,
- complex of the 1754 hospital.
