= Wygoda, Warsaw =

Neighbourhood in the city of Warsaw, Poland

Wygoda
- Neighbourhood
- Interactive map of Wygoda
- Coordinates: 52°14′47″N 21°07′59″E
- Country: Poland
- Voivodeship: Masovian Voivodeship
- City county: Warsaw
- District: Rembertów
- Municipal Information System area: Kawęczyn-Wygoda
- Time zone: UTC+1 (CET)
  - Summer (DST): UTC+2 (CEST)
- Area code: +48 22

Wygoda is a neighbourhood in Warsaw, Poland, within the district of Rembertów, in the Municipal Information System area of Kawęczyn-Wygoda.

== History ==
Since the 12th century, the village of Kawęczyn was part of the land property centered on the nearby Kamionek. In the 16th century, Kawęczyn had an area of around 117 hectares (1.17 km^{2} or 0.45 square miles).

Between 28 and 30 July 1656, the area was partially the location of the Battle of Warsaw, fought by the Polish–Lithuanian Commonwealth and the Crimean Khanate against the Swedish Empire and Brandenburg-Prussia, during the Second Northern War.

In 1796, Kawęczyn and the surrounding area, became the government property, and were integrated into the economic sphere of influence of the nearby city of Warsaw.

In 1811, Kawęczyn was inhabited by 8 cotters (peasant farmers), and had 16 houses. In the village was also located a tavern named Wygoda, located near the Brześć Road. Eventually, around the tavern had developed a settlement named Wygoda, which was community based around farming and serving the travelers. In 1827, Wygoda had a population of 42. In the village were located 5 houses.

During the November Uprising, the area was partial location of the major battles of the conflict: First Battle of Wawer fought between 19 and 20 February 1831, and Battle of Olszynka Grochowska on 25 February 1831.

In 1877, Wygoda had 77 inhabitants, and 5 houses.

On 15 May 1951, Wygoda was incorporated into the city of Warsaw.
