= Home Army Praga Subdistrict Park =

Urban park in Warsaw, Poland

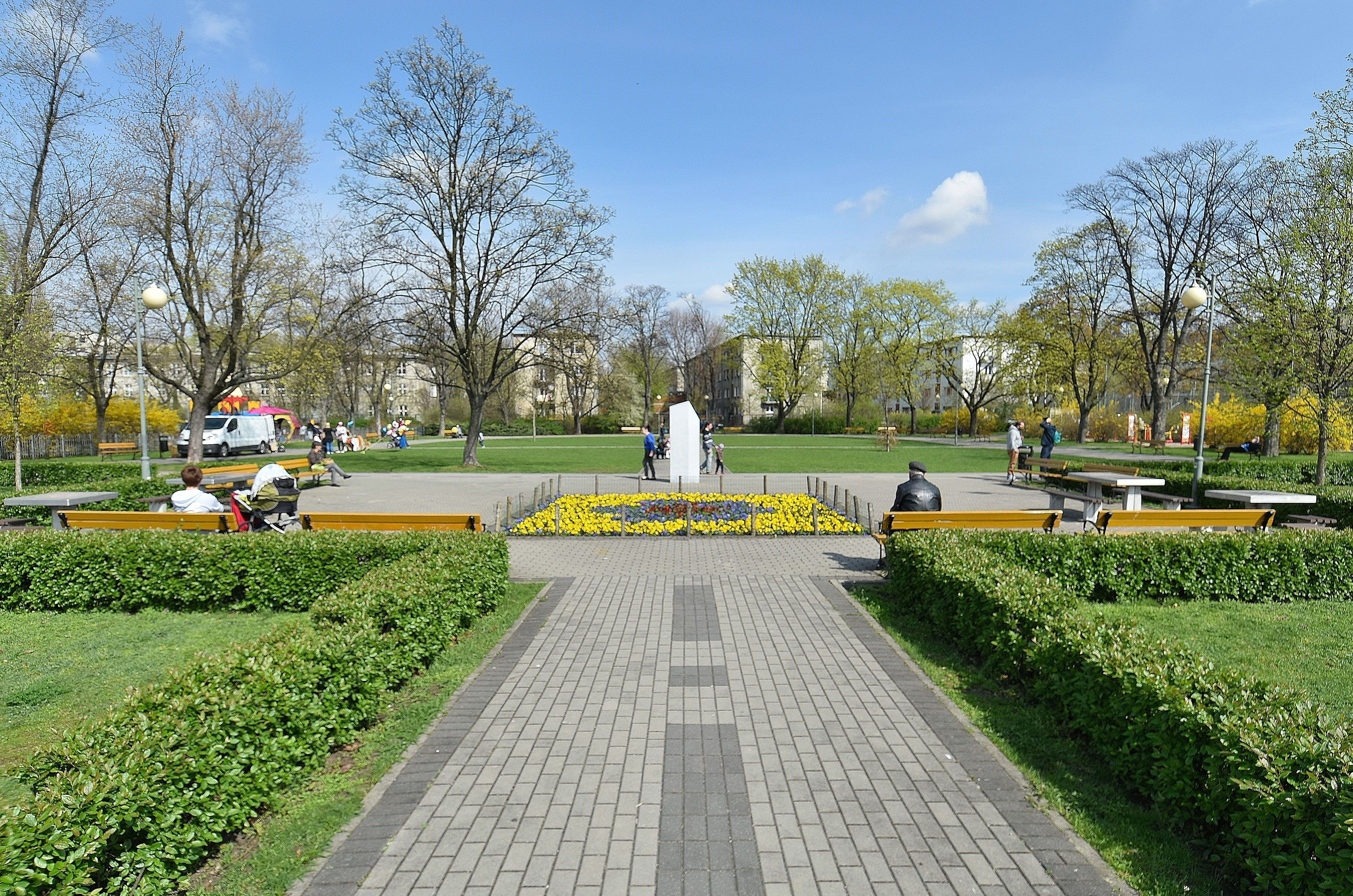
- The Home Army Praga Subdistrict Park in 2016.
- Interactive map of Home Army Praga Subdistrict Park
- Type: Urban park
- Location: Praga-South, Warsaw, Poland
- Coordinates: 52°14′49″N 21°04′23″E
- Created: 1953
- Designer: Zygmunt Hellwig

The Home Army Praga Subdistrict Park (Note: Polish: Park Obwodu Praga Armii Krajowej) is an urban park in Warsaw, Poland. It is located in the neighbourhood of Kamionek, within the district of Praga-South, between Grochowska Street, Podskarbińska Street, Kobielska Street, and Weterynaryjna Street. The park was opened in 1953.

== History ==
The park was designed by Zygmunt Hellwig and opened in 1953. It was originally named the Hanna Sawicka Park.

In 2005, it was renamed to its current name, after the Praga Subdistrict, a territorial organisational unit of the Home Army during the World War II. The park was renovated and reopened in September 2006.

== Characteristics ==
The park is located in the neighbourhood of Kamionek, within the district of Praga-South, between Grochowska Street, Podskarbińska Street, Kobielska Street, and Weterynaryjna Street. It is fenced, and opened from 7 am to 10 pm. It has the total area of 3.46 ha.
