= Attack on the NKVD Camp in Rembertów =

Polish Underground raid in 1945

- Part of Anti-communist resistance in Poland (1944–46)
Date	May 21, 1945
Location	Rembertów, Poland
Result	Home Army victory

Belligerents
Polish Underground	NKVD

Commanders and leaders
Edward Wasilewski; Edmund Swiderski	Colonel Alexandrov

Strength
44	

Casualties and losses
	Over 500 Polish captives freed

On May 21, 1945, a unit of the Polish Home Army (Armia Krajowa, AK), led by Colonel Edward Wasilewski, attacked a Soviet NKVD camp located in Rembertów in the eastern outskirts of Warsaw. Hundreds of Polish citizens had been imprisoned there, including members of the Home Army and other members of the underground resistance. Prisoners at the camp were being systematically deported to Siberia. As a result of the attack, all of the Polish political prisoners were freed from the camp by the pro-independence resistance.

== Background ==
Rembertów is located within the boundaries of Warsaw. In the 1940s, it was a separate town. In the summer of 1941, after the Operation Barbarossa the German invasion of the Soviet Union, the Wehrmacht opened "Stalag 333", a camp for Soviet Prisoners of War (POWs), located in a former ammunition factory (or "pocisk" meaning "bullet") in Rembertów.

In 1944, the Soviet forces captured the camp and reopened it. They imprisoned members of the Home Army, who were seen as enemy combatants due to their loyalty to the Polish government in exile.

== NKVD camp ==
On July 26, 1944, the Soviet sponsored Polish Committee of National Liberation gave NKVD agents their remit in the Polish territories. Then, on September 11, 1944, Soviet forces took the town of Rembertów. The Soviet troops reopened the Rembertów prisoner of war camp to detain Polish and German prisoners as well as former Russian detainees, who were assumed to have collaborated with the Nazis. The Polish detainees included soldiers of the Home Army as well as those of other resistance organizations such as the Narodowe Siły Zbrojne (NSZ, the national army force) and the Bataliony Chłopskie (BCh, the peasant battalions). Rembertów camp also became a mustering point for Polish anti-communists being sent to Siberia. Russian troops tried to hide this from the local Polish townsfolk by ordering the prisoners in broken German.

The camp was surrounded by two barbed wire fences. Between the fences was a path patrolled by armed guards and their dogs. The camp was also guarded by NKVD officers armed with machine guns in towers. The camp commander, Colonel Alexandrov, held a roll call of prisoners at 6:00 a.m. and 6:00 p.m. each day. Conditions in the camp were harsh.

In his book, Rising '44 (2004), Norman Davies writes, "A man who passed through Rembertów described the conditions. They were not to be compared to the relative luxury at Sandbostel or Murnau" and throughout the winter of 1944–1945, "prisoners were frequently held in the open, without shelter, in a compound surrounded by barbed wire (...) According to the reports, when locals enquired about the suffering prisoners, who were clearly visible from a nearby road, they were told that the compound contained Volksdeutsche and Nazis".

On March 25, 1945, the first rail transport of Polish soldiers left Rembertów for Siberia. Over 1,000 soldiers were transported. One-quarter did not survive the journey. The dead were carried to a special rail car at the rear of the train. In early March 1945, the NKVD had arrested General Emil Fieldorf ("Nil"). Fieldorf remained unrecognised as he gave the name "Walenty Gdanicki". The Polish resistance soon learned that Fieldorf was imprisoned at the Rembertów camp. He was transported onwards to Siberia before Colonel Jan Mazurkiewicz ("Radosław") could mount an operation to free him.

== Attack ==
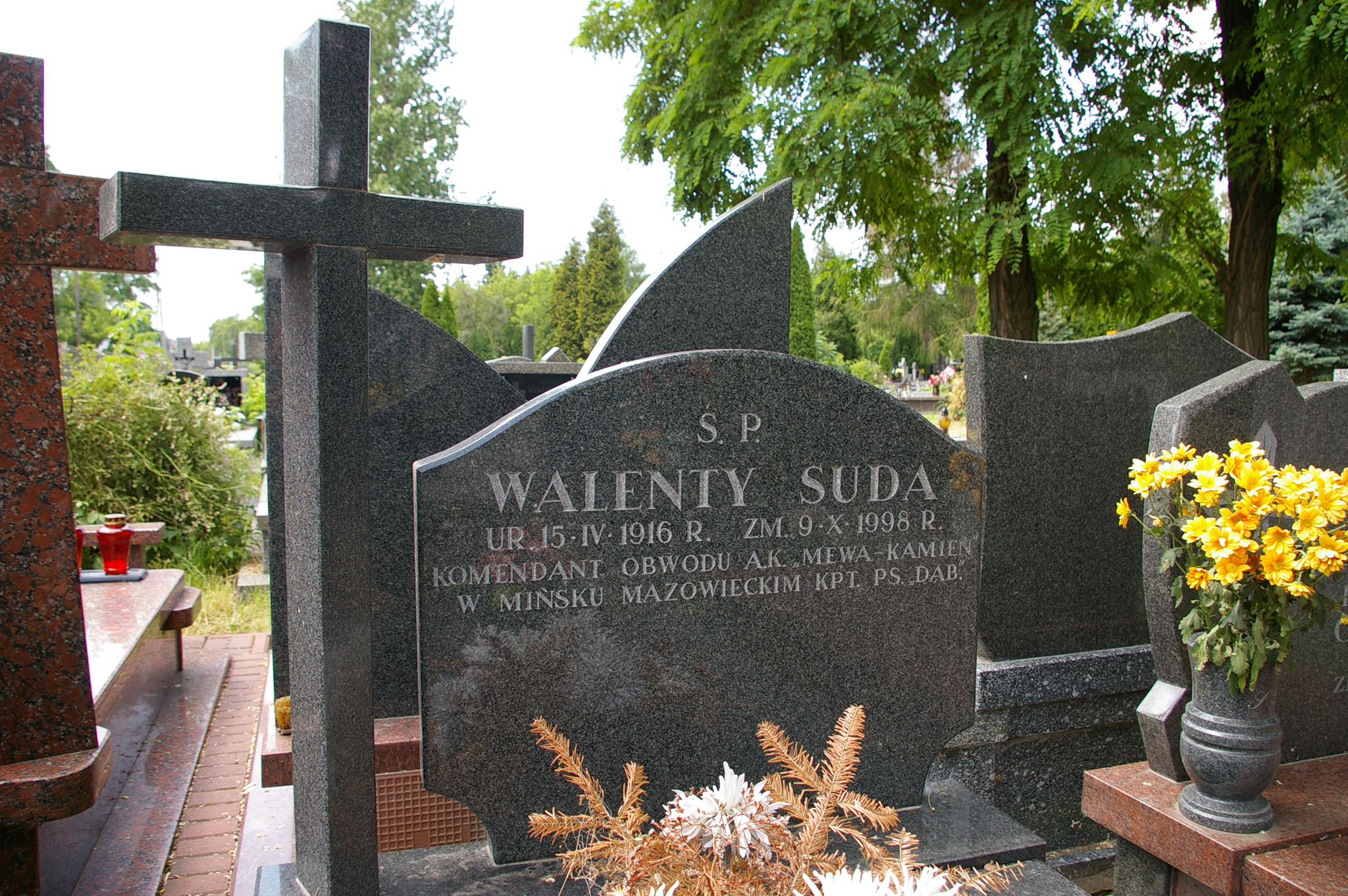
Walenty Suda's grave in Piaseczno

In April and May 1945, the NKVD brought more prisoners to the camp including General Edward Gruber, Colonel Kazimierz Marszewski and the philosopher, Kazimierz Ajdukiewicz. The next transport to Siberia was planned for May 25, 1945. Captain Walenty Suda ("Młot": hammer), the Home Army commander of Mińsk Mazowiecki District planned to attack the camp prior to the transport. Suda gave Lieutenant Edward Wasilewski ("Wichura": gale) command of 44 well-trained fighters. Thirty-two of the fighters were from Wasilewski's unit. Twelve were from the unit under Colonel Edmund Swiderski. While disguised as a soldier of the Ludowe Wojsko Polskie (Polish Communist Army), Wasilewski reconnoitred the camp. On the night of Saturday, May 20, 1945, the prisoners' relatives brought large quantities of alcohol to the camp to ensure the NKVD guards would become drunk. The prisoners were informed of the imminent attack. The Soviet camp commander left for a party in the nearby village of Kawęczyn.

The Polish Army unit travelled to Rembertów on horses from nearby Długa Kościelna village and then divided into three groups. The first group, led by "Wichura" (Gale), was to open the camp gate to release the prisoners. Wichura did not want to release German prisoners nor Russian soldiers from the units of General Andrei Vlasov. The second group's mission was to suppress the guards and the third group was to act as lookouts. The attack lasted approximately 25 minutes. The surprised NKVD guards offered little resistance and about 100 wounded and sick Polish prisoners were taken away on two trucks. The remaining prisoners dispersed into the forests and villages. Reports of the NKVD dead vary between 15 and 68 men. Approximately 40 Polish prisoners were killed by machine gun fire while escaping. Three members of the Home Army unit were injured but none killed.

== Aftermath ==
The number of prisoners released in the attack vary from 466 in NKVD reports, 800 in Home Army reports and 1,400 in other historical analyses. On the morning of Sunday, May 21, 1945, Soviet troops, supported by aircraft, combed the area around Rembertów in search of the escapees. On that day, twenty-seven escapees, mostly German soldiers who did not know where to go, were recaptured. In the following days, approximately fifty escapees were caught and some summarily executed. Lavrentiy Beria in Moscow ordered a special investigation; dismissed the commander of the Rembertów camp and closed the camp; and ordered a review of all such camps. On May 21, 1995, a monument to commemorate the camp and the attack was unveiled in Rembertów. The text of the tablet on the monument reads:

W miejscu tym na terenie dawnej fabryki "Pocisk" znajdowały się obozy od września 1941 do początku 1944 - hitlerowski obóz pracy jeńców sowieckich - komando stalag 333 - od lipca 1944 do września 1944 - hitlerowski obóz pracy dla więźniów polskich - od września 1944 do lipca 1945 sowiecki obóz specjalny NKWD nr 10. Żołnierzom oddziału partyzanckiego Armii Krajowej Obozu "Mewa - Kamień" Mińsk Mazowiecki który pod dowództwem ppor. Edwarda Wasilewskiego "Wichury" nocą z 20 na 21 maja 1945 roku rozbił obóz specjalny NKWD nr 10 w Rembertowie. Z obozu uwolniono ponad 500 więźniów akcja ta przerwała zsyłkę więźniów na wschód. Więźniom obozu NKWD nr 10 w Rembertowie żołnierzom i działaczom Polskiego Państwa Podziemnego represjonowanym i mordowanym których szczątki spoczywają na terenie dawnej fabryki amunicji "Pocisk" i na obszarach sowieckiego imperium.

English translation:

In this place, on the grounds of the former factory "Pocisk" the following camps were located: from September 1941 until the beginning of 1944, a Nazi labor camp for Soviet prisoners of war, Komando Stalag 333; from July 1944 until September 1944, a Nazi labor camp for Polish prisoners; from September 1944 until July 1945, Soviet NKVD special camp No.10. (The monument is dedicated to) the soldiers of the partisan unit of the Home Army from Camp "Mewa-Kamień", Mińsk Mazowiecki, who under the command of 2nd Lieutenant Edward Wasilewski "Wichura", overran the special NKVD camp No.10 in Rembertów on the night of 20/21 May 1945. Over 500 prisoners were freed from the camp and this action interrupted the deportation of the prisoners to the East. (This monument is dedicated to) prisoners of the NKVD camp No.10 in Rembertów, soldiers and activists of the Polish Underground State, repressed and murdered, whose remains lay on the grounds of former factory "Pocisk" and in the lands of the Soviet empire.

== See also ==
- Soviet repressions of Polish citizens (1939-1946)
- Raids on communist prisons in Poland (1944-1946)
- Cursed soldiers
- Battle of Kurylowka
- Raid on Kielce Prison
