= Kawęczyn-Wygoda =

Neighbourhood in the city of Warsaw, Poland

- Neighbourhood and Municipal Information System area
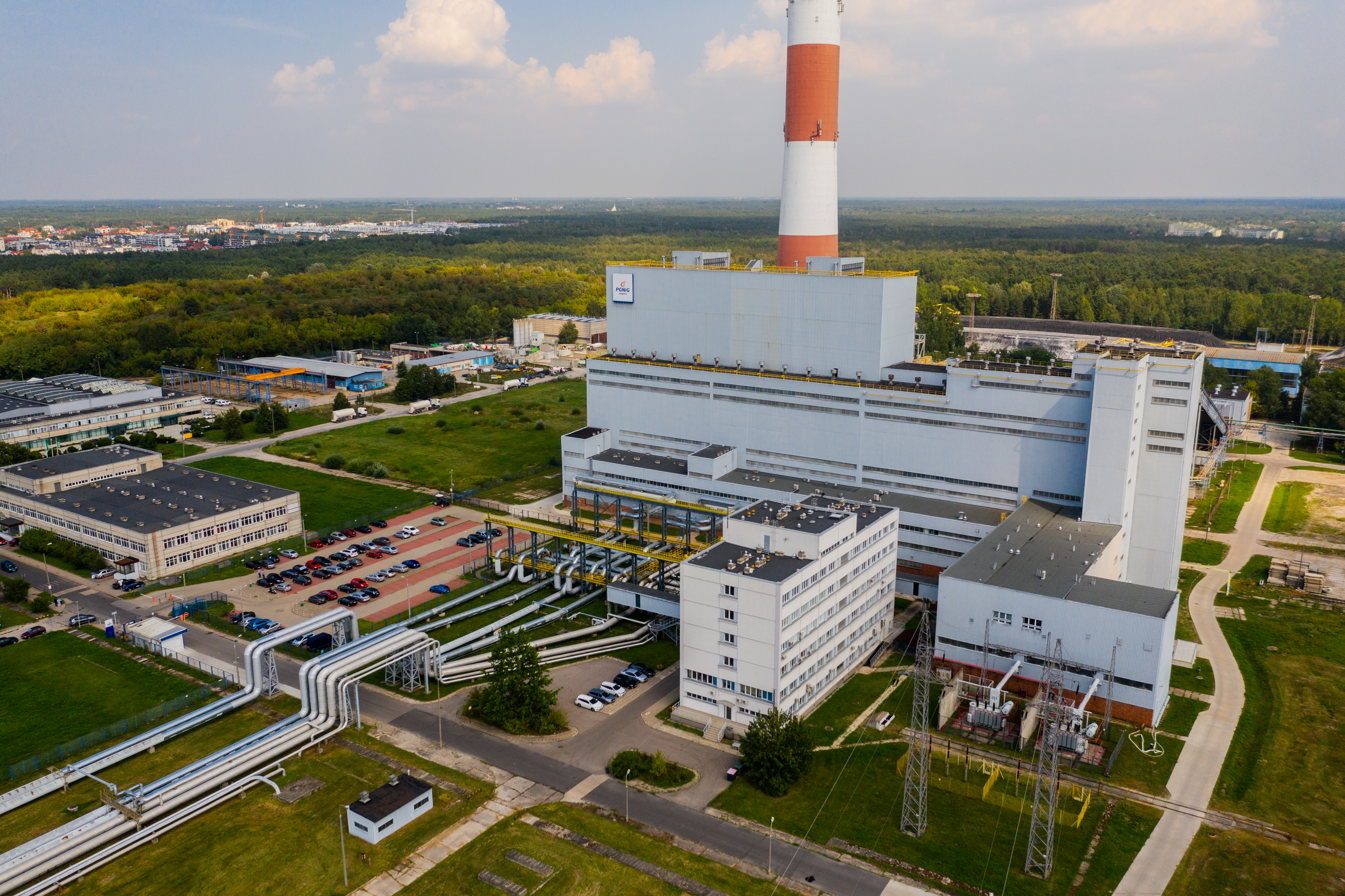
- The Kawęczyn Heat Plant located in Kawęczyn-Wygoda, in 2021.

- Location of Kawęczyn-Wygoda within the district of Rembertów, in accordance to the Municipal Information System.
- Coordinates: 52°15′37.48″N 21°07′18.61″E
- Country: Poland
- Voivodeship: Masovian Voivodeship
- City county: Warsaw
- District: Rembertów
- Time zone: UTC+1 (CET)
  - Summer (DST): UTC+2 (CEST)
- Area code: +48 22

Kawęczyn-Wygoda is a neighbourhood, and an area of the Municipal Information System, in the city of Warsaw, Poland, located within the district of Rembertów.

== History ==
In 1931, in the area of modern Kawęczyn was discovered a cemetery, containing 19 graves of cremated bodies. The discovery was described in 1932 as dating back to the period of the Later Roman Empire (3rd century – 7th century). It was later proposed by some archologies, such as Barbara Jankowska, that the archeological presence of artefacts of cultures of Corded Ware, Comb Ceramic, Trzciniec, and Bell Jar Urn, was proof that the cemetery was older than previously estimated.

Since 12th century, Kawęczyn was part of the land property centered on the nearby Kamionek. In the 16th century, Kawęczyn had an area of around 117 hectares (1.17 km^{2} or 0.45 square miles).

Between 28 and 30 July 1656, Kawęczyn was partially the location of the Battle of Warsaw, fought by the Polish–Lithuanian Commonwealth and the Crimean Khanate against the Swedish Empire and Brandenburg-Prussia, during the Second Northern War.

In 1796, Kawęczyn and the surrounding area, became the government property, and were integrated into the economic sphere of influence of the nearby city of Warsaw.

In 1811, Kawęczyn was inhabited by 8 cotters (peasant farmers), and had 16 houses. In the village was also located a tavern named Wygoda, located near the Brześć Road. Eventually, around the tavern had developed a settlement named Wygoda, with community based around farming and serving the travelers. In 1827, Kawęczyn had a population of 131 people, while Wygoda, a population of 42. In Kawęczyn were are located 24 houses, and in Wygoda, 5. In Kawęczyn was also located the brick factory and a factory of terracotta products.

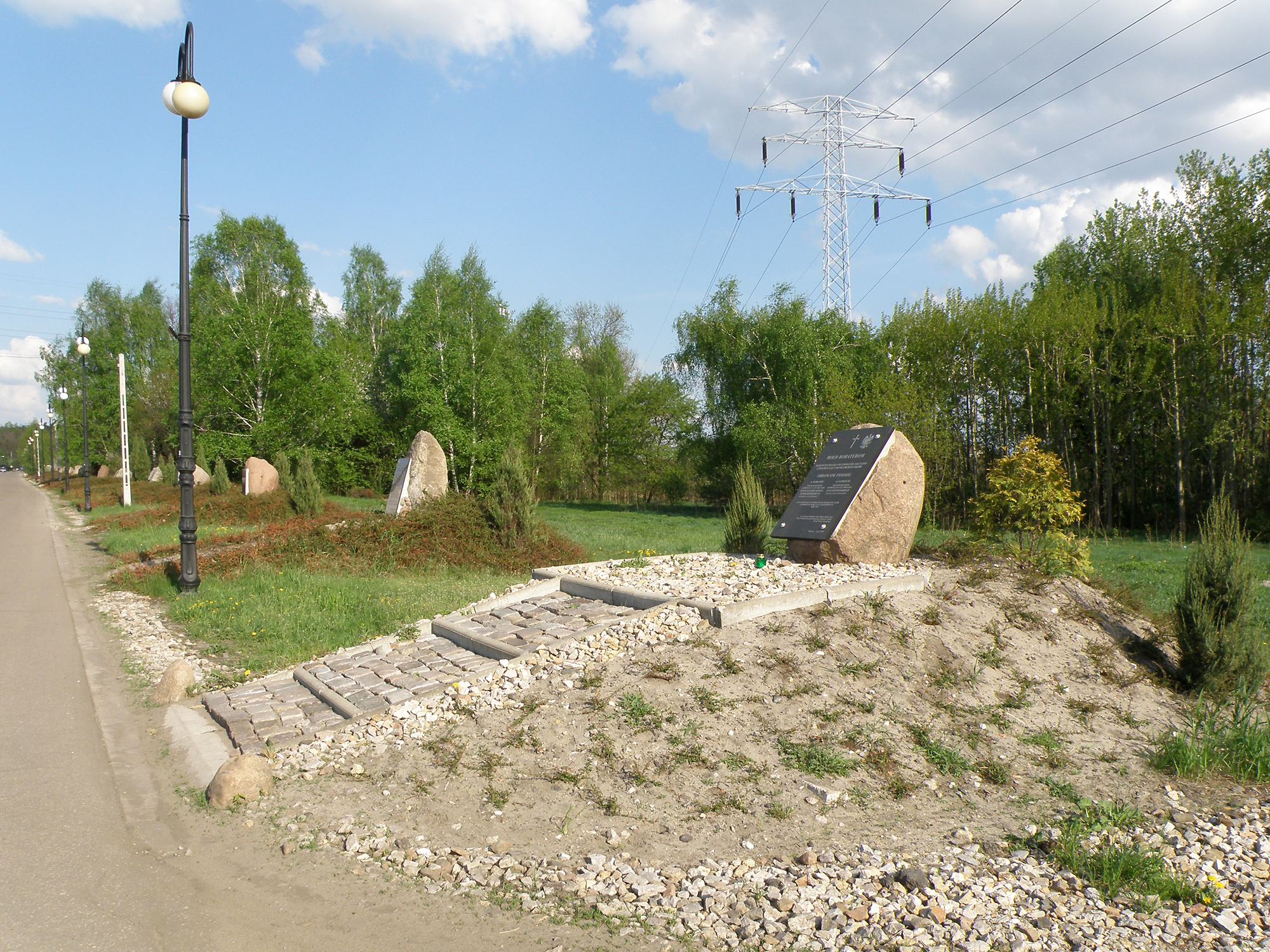
The Avenue of Glory, a monument commemorating Polish soldiers of the Battle of Olszynka Grochowska, located at the Traczy Street.

During the November Uprising, the area was partial location of the major battles of the conflict: First Battle of Wawer fought between 19 and 20 February 1831, and Battle of Olszynka Grochowska on 25 February 1831.

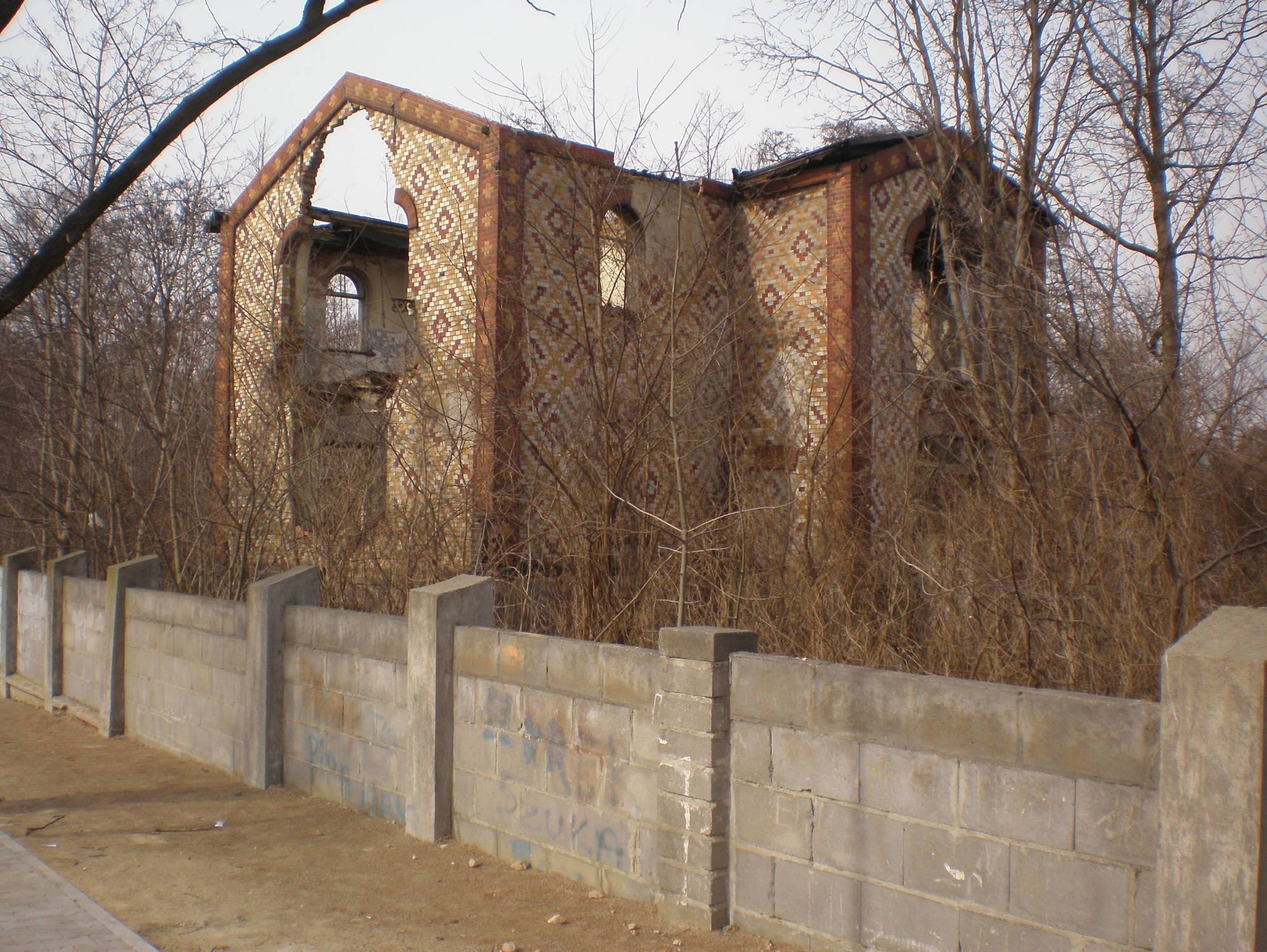
The ruins of the Granzow Villa, the historical headquarters of the administration of the Kawęczyńskie Zakłady Cegielniane Kazimierza Granzowa (Kazimierz Granzow's Kawęczyn Brick Factories).

In 1826, the brick factory in Kawęczyn was nationalized and control over it was given to the city of Warsaw. In 1866, local businessmen Kazimierz Granzow, transform the factory into Kawęczyńskie Zakłady Cegielniane Kazimierza Granzowa (Kazimierz Granzow's Kawęczyn Brick Factories), which become the biggest brickworks in the Congress Poland for the next 80 years.

In 1877, Wygoda had 77 inhabitantes, and 5 houses.

Between 1882 and 1893, the Fort Kawęczyn had been built within modern boundaries of Kawęczyn-Wygoda, as part of the series of fortifications of the Warsaw Fortress, build around Warsaw by the Russian Empire. In 1909, it was decided to decommission and demolish the fortifications of the Warsaw Fortress, due to the high costs of their maintenance, and as such the Fort Kawęczyn had been deconstructed in the next following years. Currently there is not any remainders of the construction in the area.

In 1905, Kawęczyn had a population of 1437 people. In the village were located 51 houses, 5 stores, a school, brick factory and the forge.

On 8 April 1916, the settlement of Zapowiednia, which was a part of the landed property of Kawęczyn, was incorporated into the city of Warsaw. Currently, it corresponds to the neighbourhood of Grochów V, which is part of area of Grochów.

In 1921, Kawenczyn was divided into a village inhabited by 416 people, and a company town inhabited by 563 people, which in total was 979 people.

On 1 April 1939, Kawęczyn was incorporated into the town of Rembertów, which itself was formed on that day from the towns of Rembertów Nowy and Rembertów Stary, and the surrounding villages.

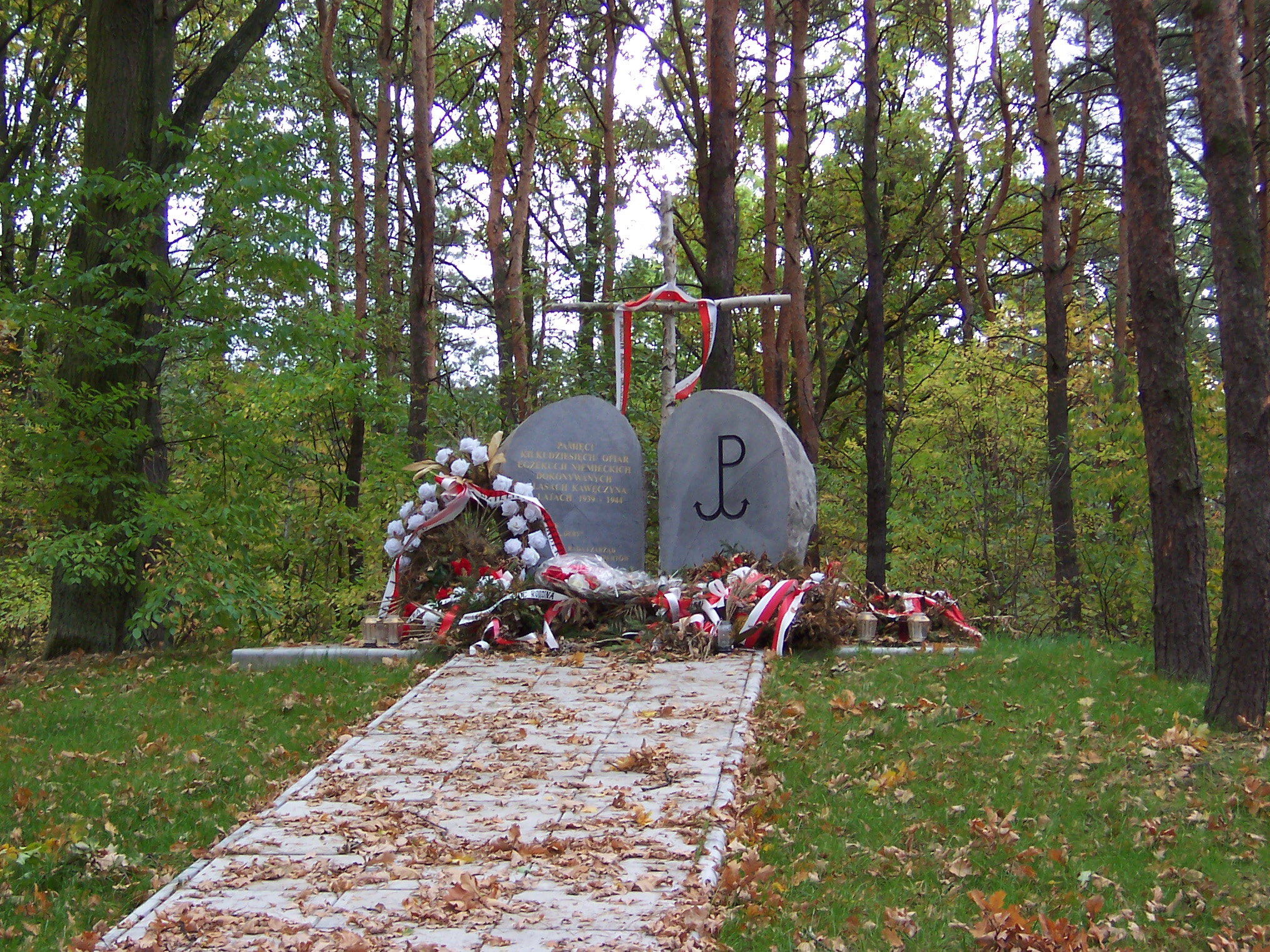
The Monument of the Victims of German Execution in Kawęczyn Woods.

Between 1940 and 1944, during the Second World War, while under the German occupation, in Kawęczyn, soldiers of Nazi Germany had executed at least several dozen people, which were then buried there in mass graves. Among the victims were members of the Zawisza group of the Gray Ranks, and major Roman Węgrowicz, officer of the Home Army. In 1944, the brick factory in Kawęczyn was destroyed in the arial bombardment.

On 15 May 1951, Wygoda was incorporated into the city of Warsaw.

On 1 April 1957, the town of Rembertów was incorporated into Warsaw.

In 1979, in Kawęczyn had begun the construction of the Kawęczyn Heat Plant, with the building being opened in 1983.
