= Kawęczyn Heat Plant =

Power plant in Warsaw, Poland

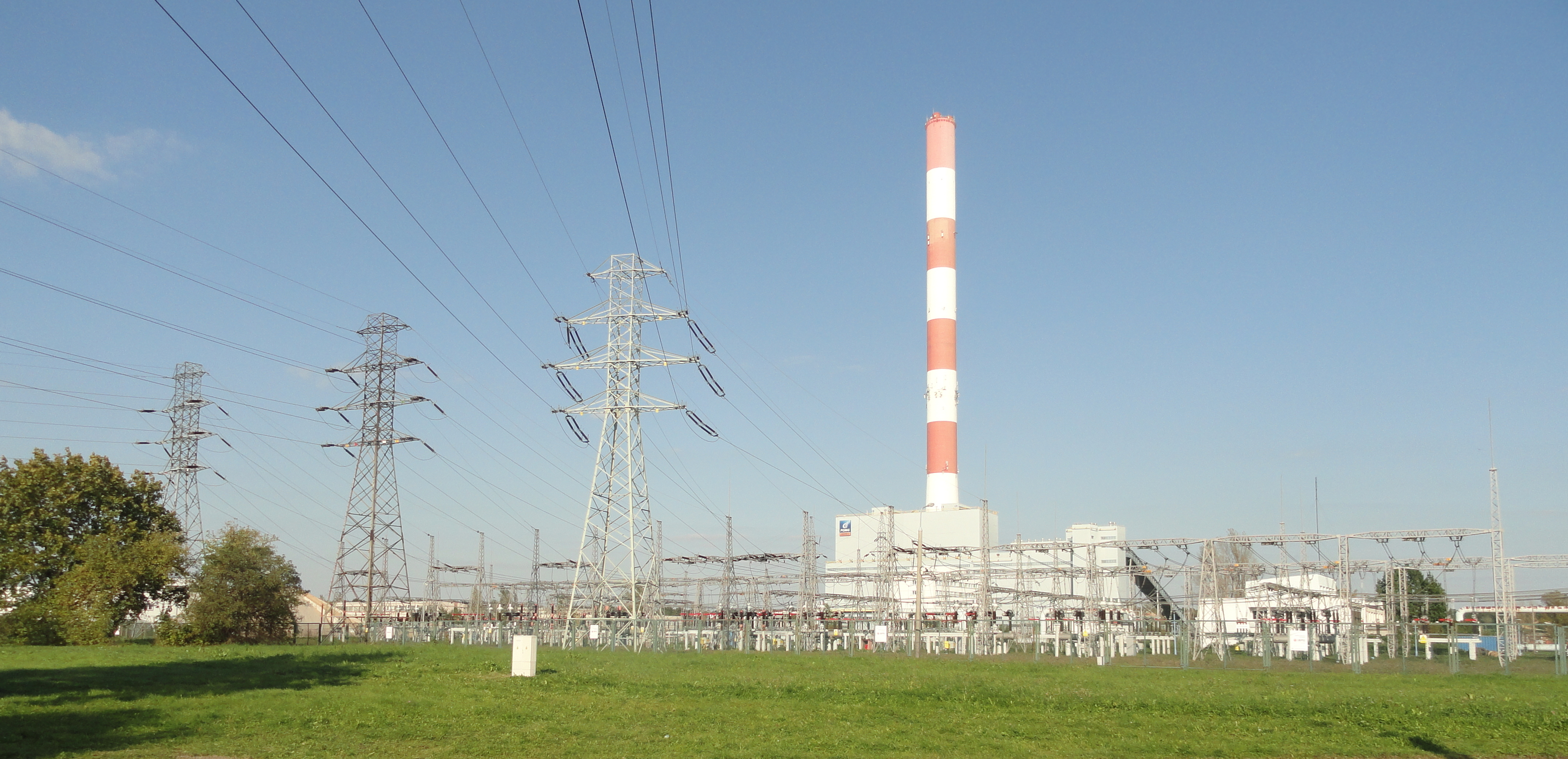
- Official name: Ciepłownia Kawęczyn
- Country: Poland
- Location: Warsaw
- Coordinates: 52°16′5″N 21°7′43″E
- Status: Operational
- Operator: PGNiG

Thermal power station
- Primary fuel: Coal
- Thermal capacity: 512 MW

External links
- Commons: Related media on Commons

The Kawęczyn Heat Plant is a coal-fired heat plant located in Kawęczyn in the Rembertów district of Warsaw, Poland.

Construction commenced in 1979, and the plant became operational in 1983. It was operated by the Swedish energy company Vattenfall between the years 2000 and 2012, after which their Polish operations were taken over by the Polish energy company PGNiG. Following the merger of PGNiG and Orlen in 2022, the plant is currently owned and maintained by Orlen Termika S.A.

The heat plant has an installed thermal capacity of 512 MW. It has one 300-metre (980 ft) high flue gas stack, which is one of Poland's tallest free standing structures.

== See also ==
- List of towers
