= Grochowska Street, Warsaw =

Street in Warsaw

Grochowska Street
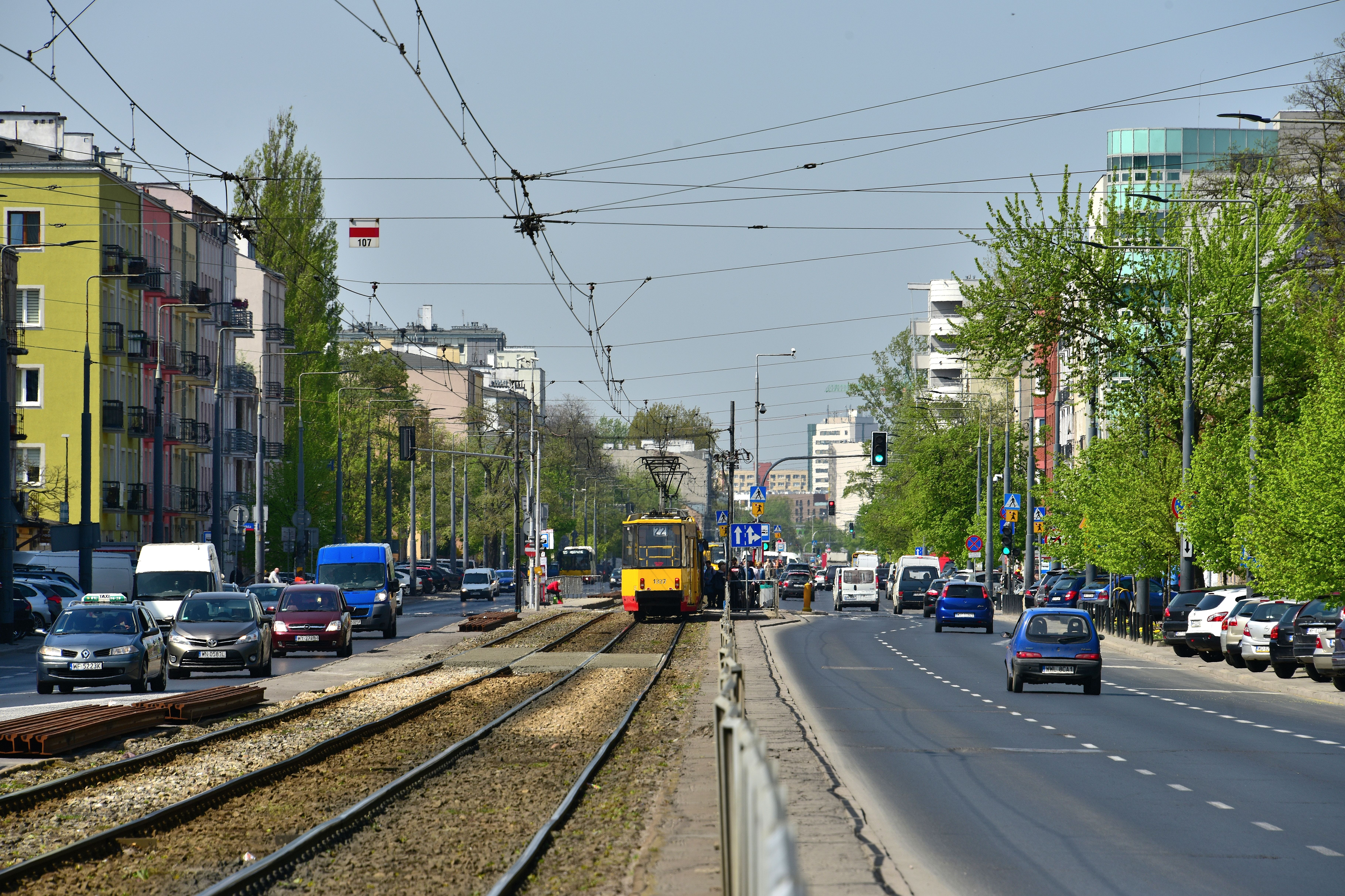
- Interactive map of Grochowska Street
- Native name: Ulica Grochowska (Polish)
- Maintained by: ZDM Warsaw
- Length: 3.23 mi (5.20 km)
- Location: Praga Południe, Warsaw, Poland
- Coordinates: 52.244917°N 21.088889°E
- West end: Jana Zamoyskiego
- East end: Płowiecka

Other
- Website: zdm.waw.pl

Grochowska Street is a major road located in the Praga Południe district of Warsaw, Poland. Since November 1, 1925, a tram route has run along Grochowska Street. Currently trams and many bus lines connect Praga with Śródmieście, Wola, Rembertów and Wawer.

== History ==
On January 4, 1901, along the entire length of Grochowska Street, the WKD Jabłonowska was launched - a steam narrow-gauge railway with a track gauge of 800 mm, connecting Jabłonna with Wawer. Two stations were opened at Grochowska - Rogatki Moskiewskie and Grochów . In July 1915, the Russian troops blew up the Rogatki Moskiewskie station.

In 1925, after a tram line was launched along the street, steps were taken to liquidate the railway. On September 7, 1939, the cable car lines were suspended due to hostilities and then reactivated a month later. The Warsaw Uprising prevented the line from running. The WKD Jabłonowska railway was reborn as a state-owned enterprise in 1945. The last time the railway was used at Grochowska Street was on January 31, 1956.
