= Kamionek, Warsaw =

District of Warsaw

Coordinates: 52.2417°N 21.0836°E

Kamionek
- Osiedle
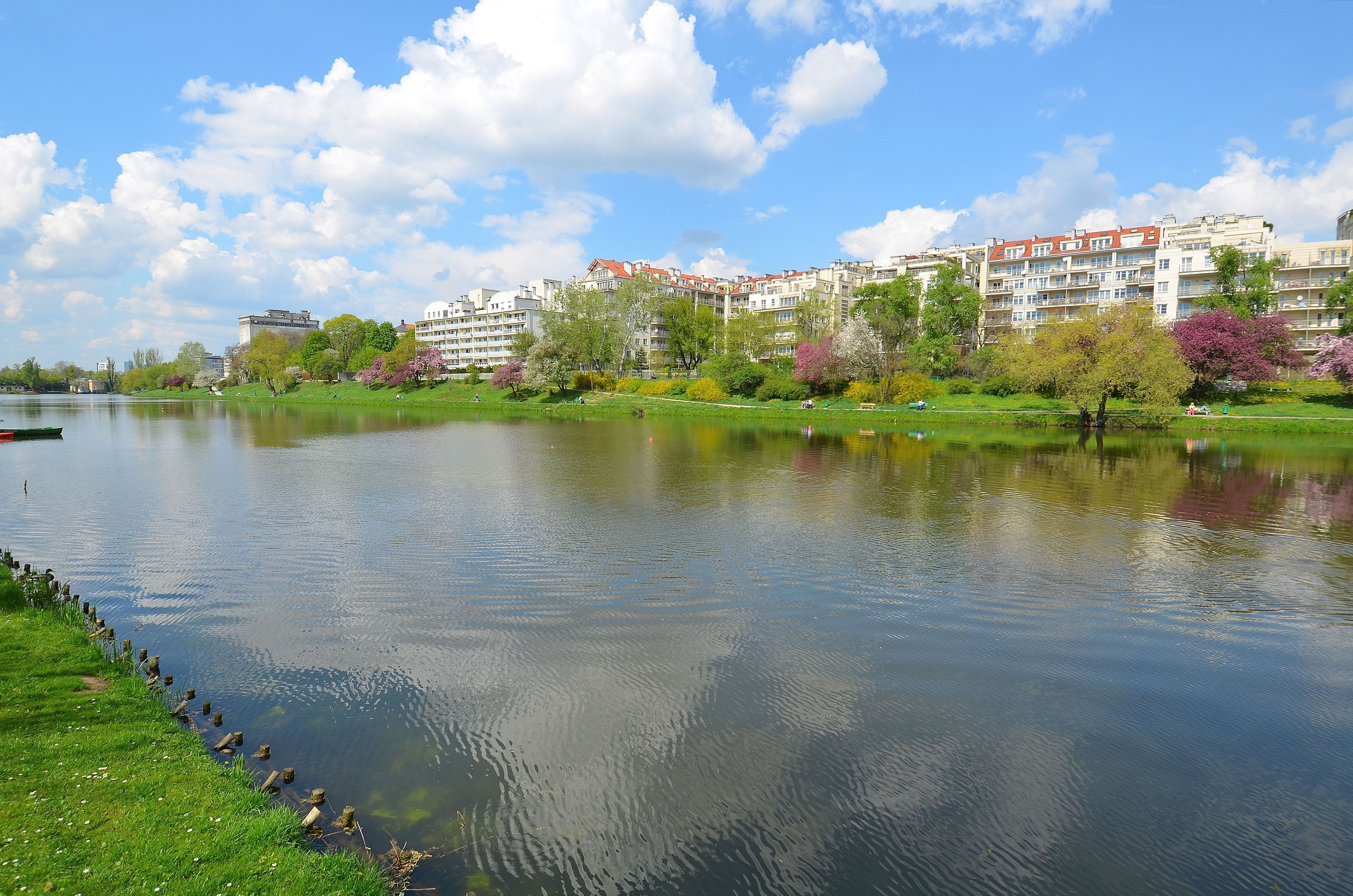
- View over Kamionek Lake

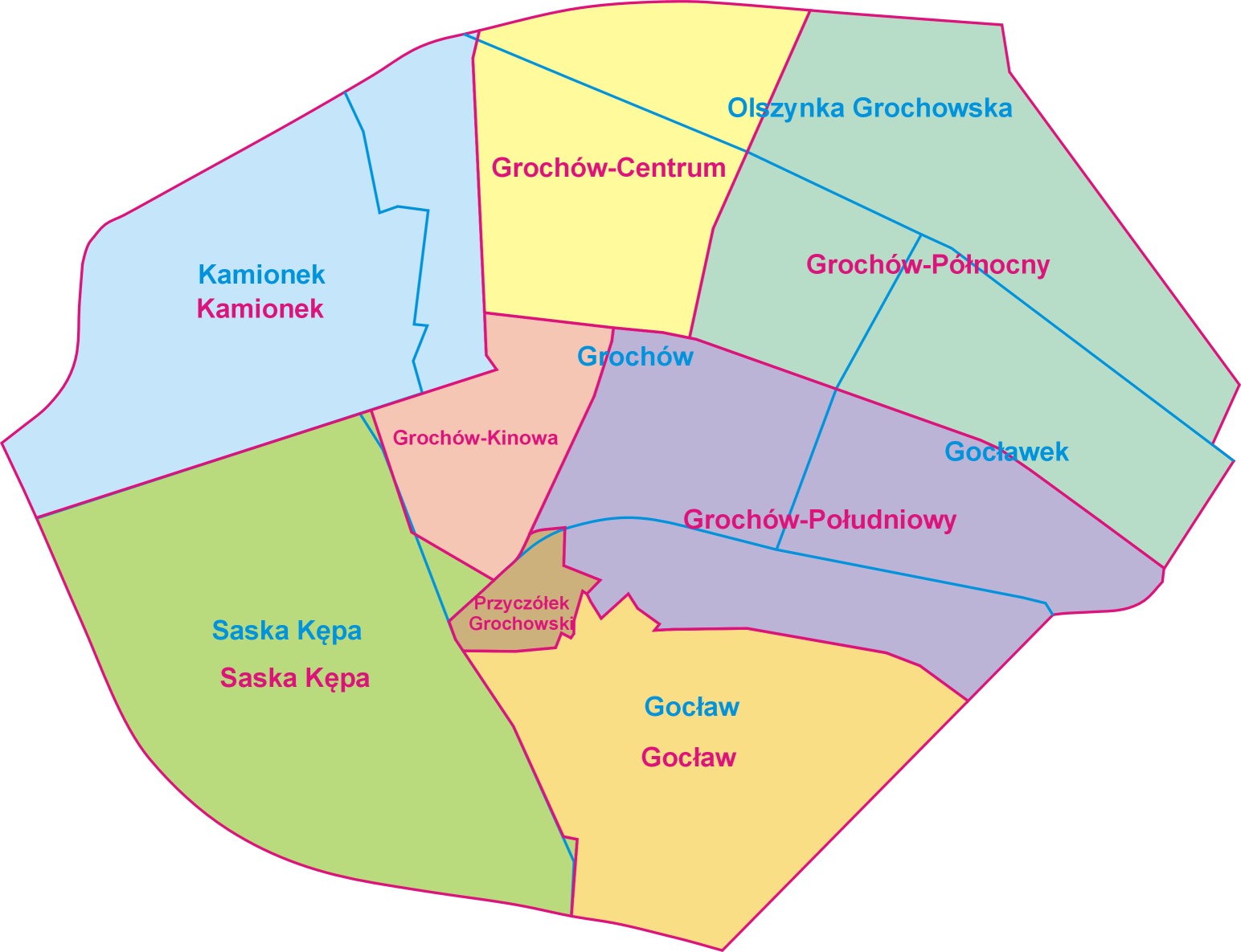
- Location of Kamionek within Praga-Południe
- Country: Poland
- Voivodeship: Masovia
- City: Warsaw
- Dzielnica: Praga-Południe
- Established: Incorporated into Warsaw 1890

Kamionek is a neighbourhood in Warsaw, located on the right bank of the Vistula river. It is the birthplace of the Polish statesman Roman Dmowski. Formerly a village, in the 19th century, with the beginning of the Industrial Revolution in this part of the Russian Empire, it was transformed into a textile industry center. Today it is part of Praga-Południe, and most of its factories closed after the fall of the communism in Poland. It borders the Skaryszew Park and Kamionek Lake to the south, Grochów to the east, and Praga to the north.

During the November Uprising in 1831, the cemetery in Kamionek was the primary location where fallen soldiers of the Russian Army were buried.
