= Rembertów =

District of Warsaw, Poland

- Warsaw District
- Flag Coat of arms

- Location of Rembertów within Warsaw
- Coordinates: 52°15′32″N 21°9′40″E
- Country: Poland
- Voivodeship: Masovian
- County/City: Warsaw

Government
  - Mayor: Agnieszka Kądeja

Area
  - Total: 19.30 km^{2} (7.45 sq mi)

Population (2019)
  - Total: 24,328
  - Density: 1,261/km^{2} (3,265/sq mi)
- Time zone: UTC+1 (CET)
  - Summer (DST): UTC+2 (CEST)
- Area code: +48 22
- Website: rembertow.um.warszawa.pl

Rembertów (Polish pronunciation: [rɛmˈbɛrtuf]) is a district of the city of Warsaw, the capital of Poland. Between 1939 and 1957 Rembertów was a separate town, after which it was incorporated as part of the borough of Praga-Południe. Between 1994 and 2002 it formed a separate commune of Warszawa-Rembertów. In the 1940s it was a site of a prison operated first by Nazis and then by Soviets.

The borough of Rembertów covers 19.30 km² and as of 2004 had 21,893 inhabitants. It is sparsely populated; more than 30% of the borough is covered by forests. Parts of it form the Kawęczyn Forest Reserve.

During the Russian Poland period, there was a Russian artillery presence in the area. In 1899, military maneuvers took place to practice shooting down balloons and defending fortified cities.

Rembertów is home to the Academy of National Defence, established in 1947 as the Academy of General Staff (Akademia Sztabu Głównego). It is here that military executions were carried out under the communist regime. From 1970 to 1988 three soldiers were shot by firing squad for murder with rape.

== Neighbourhoods within the district ==
- Kawęczyn
- Nowy Rembertów
- Stary Rembertów

== Photo gallery ==
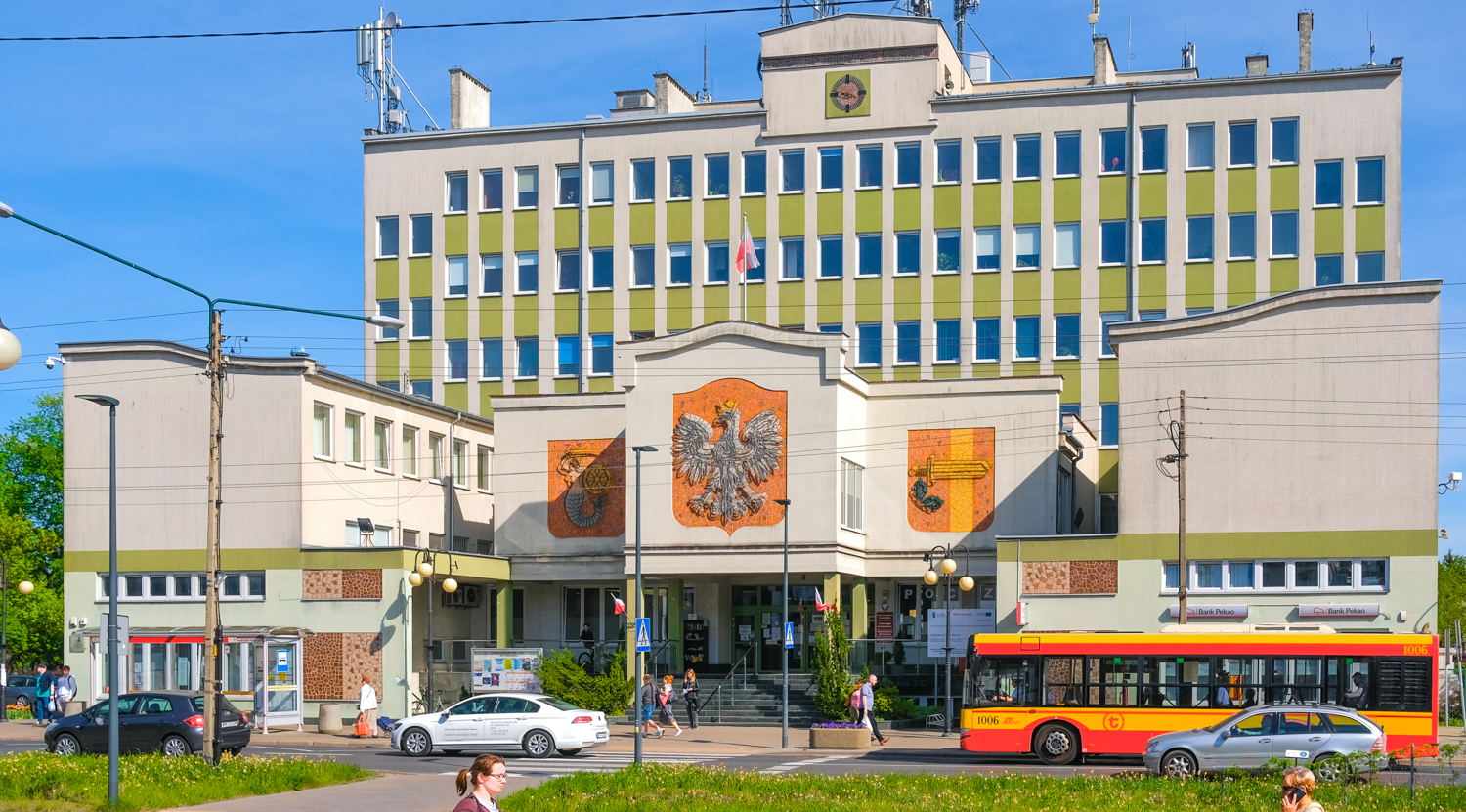
Rembertów Town Hall

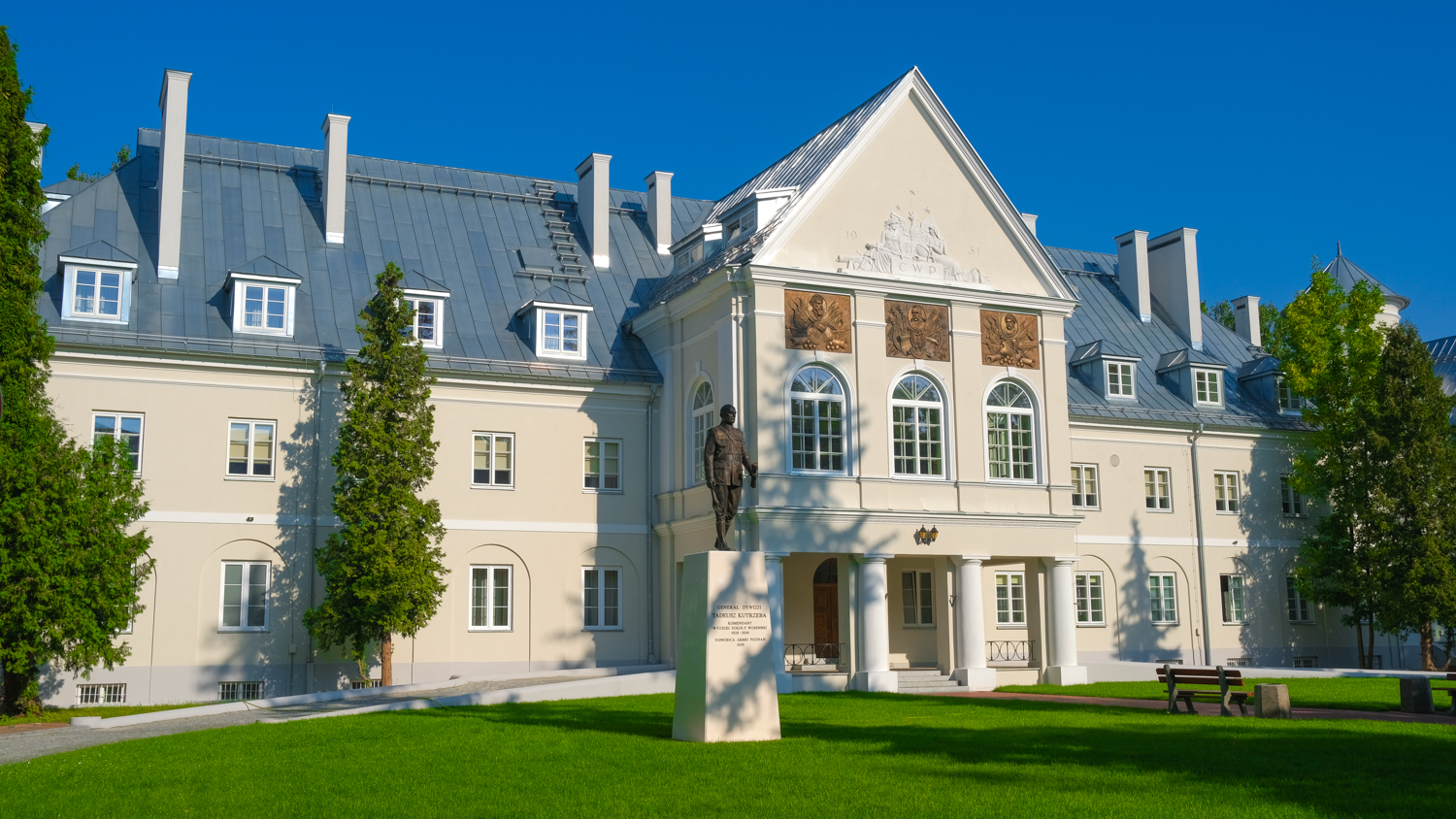
War Studies Academy

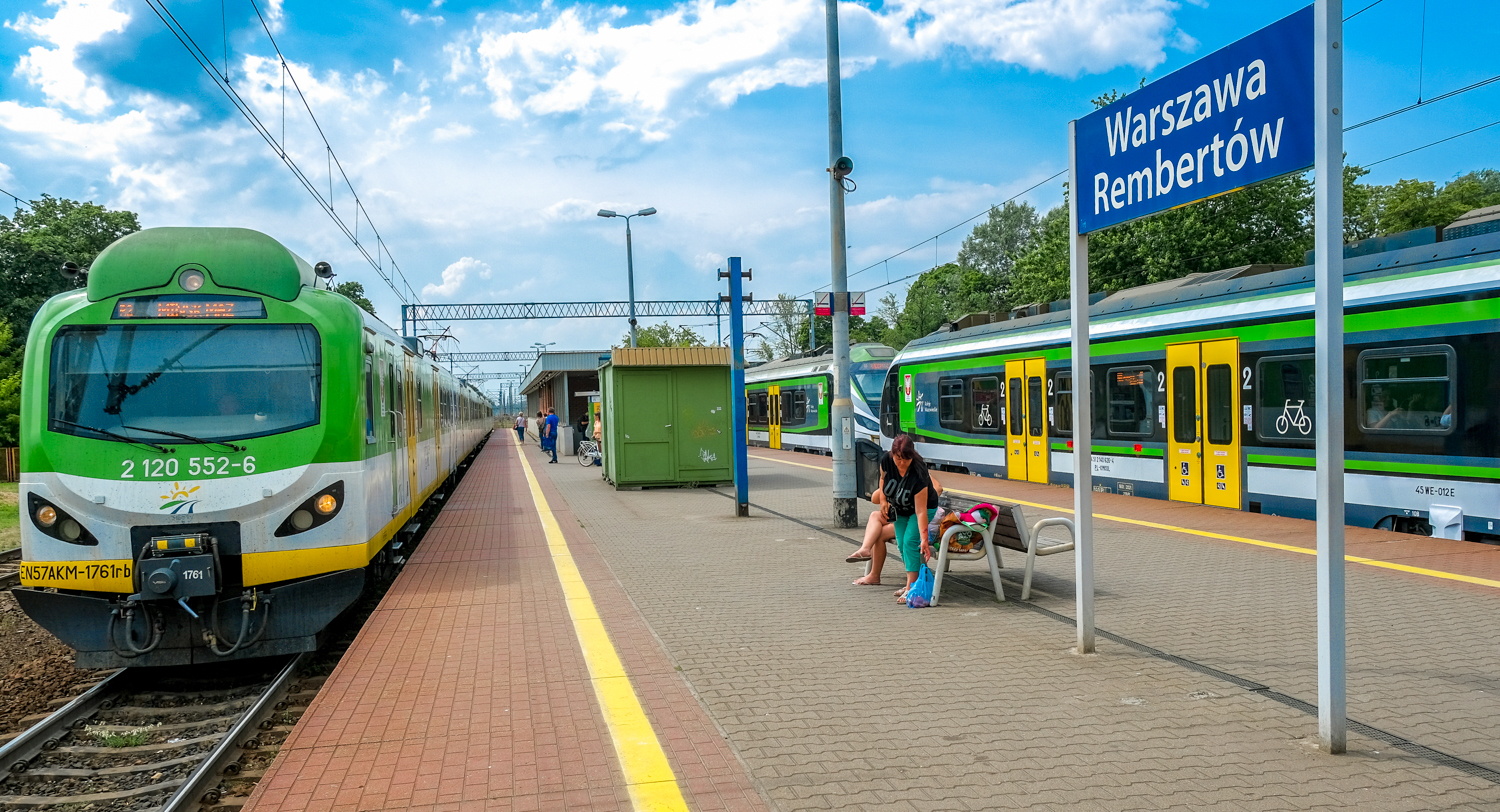
Warsaw Rembertow Railway station

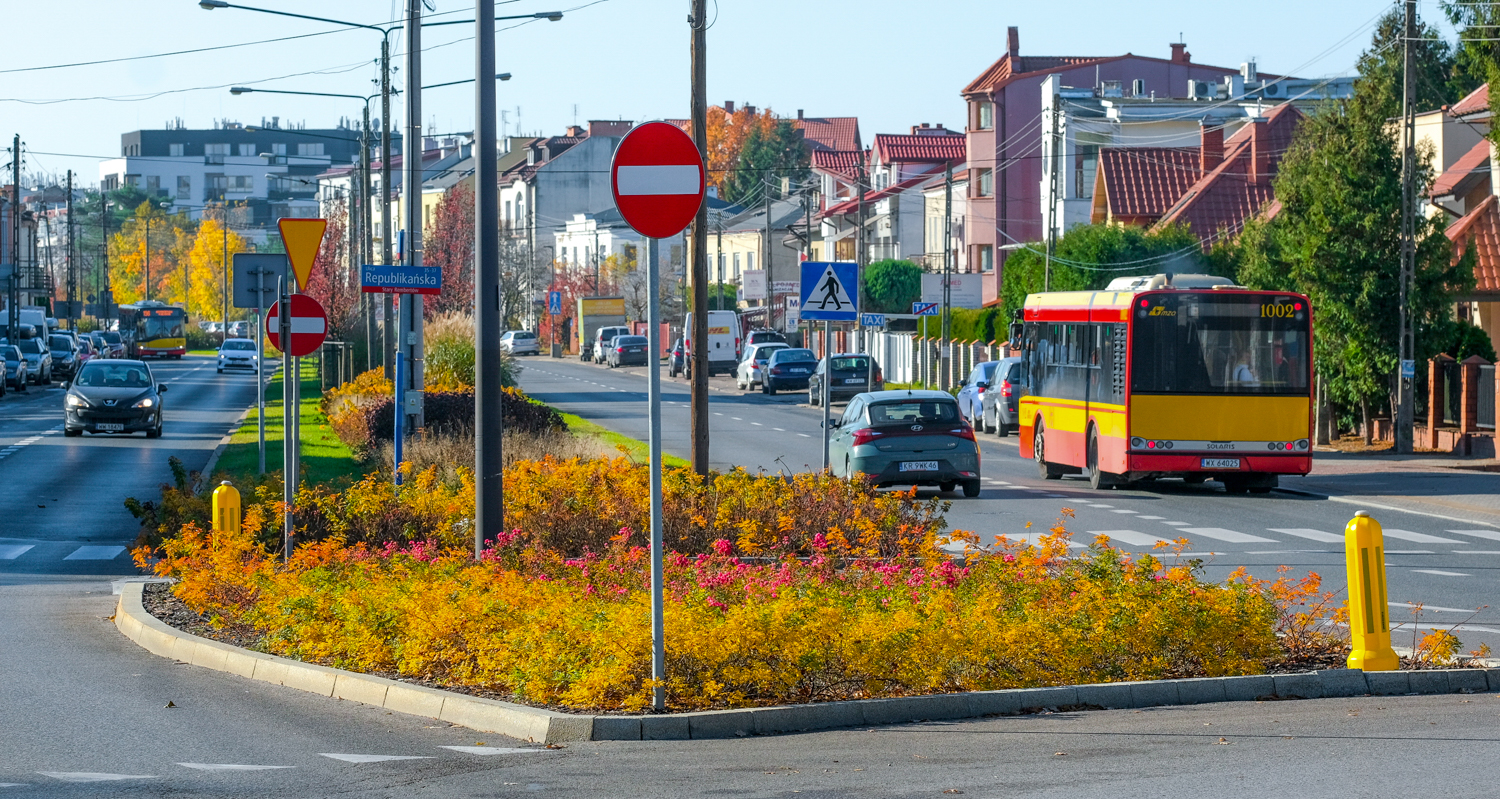
Antoniego Chruściela "Montera" Avenue, one of the main streets

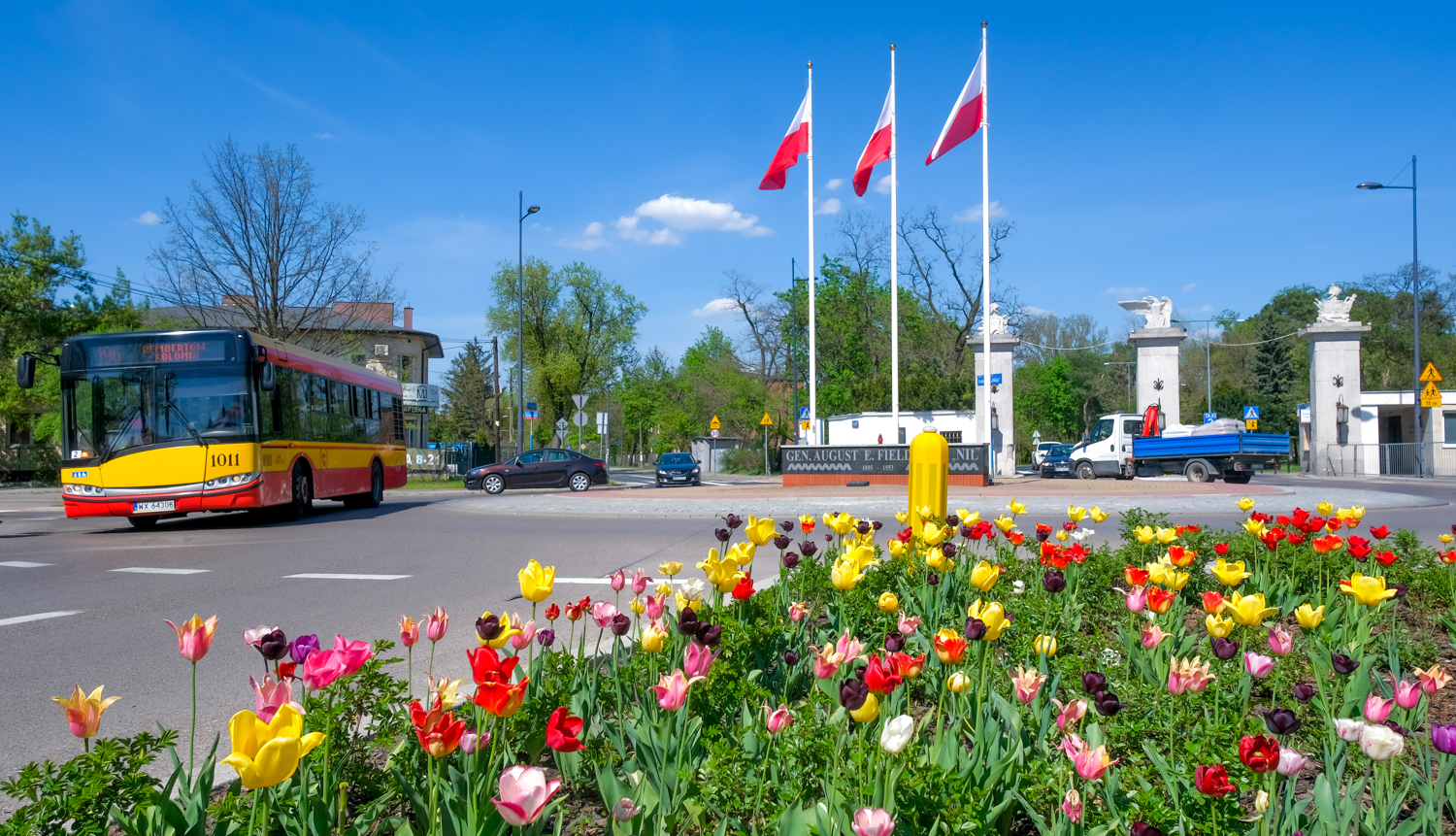
Fieldorfa Roundabout

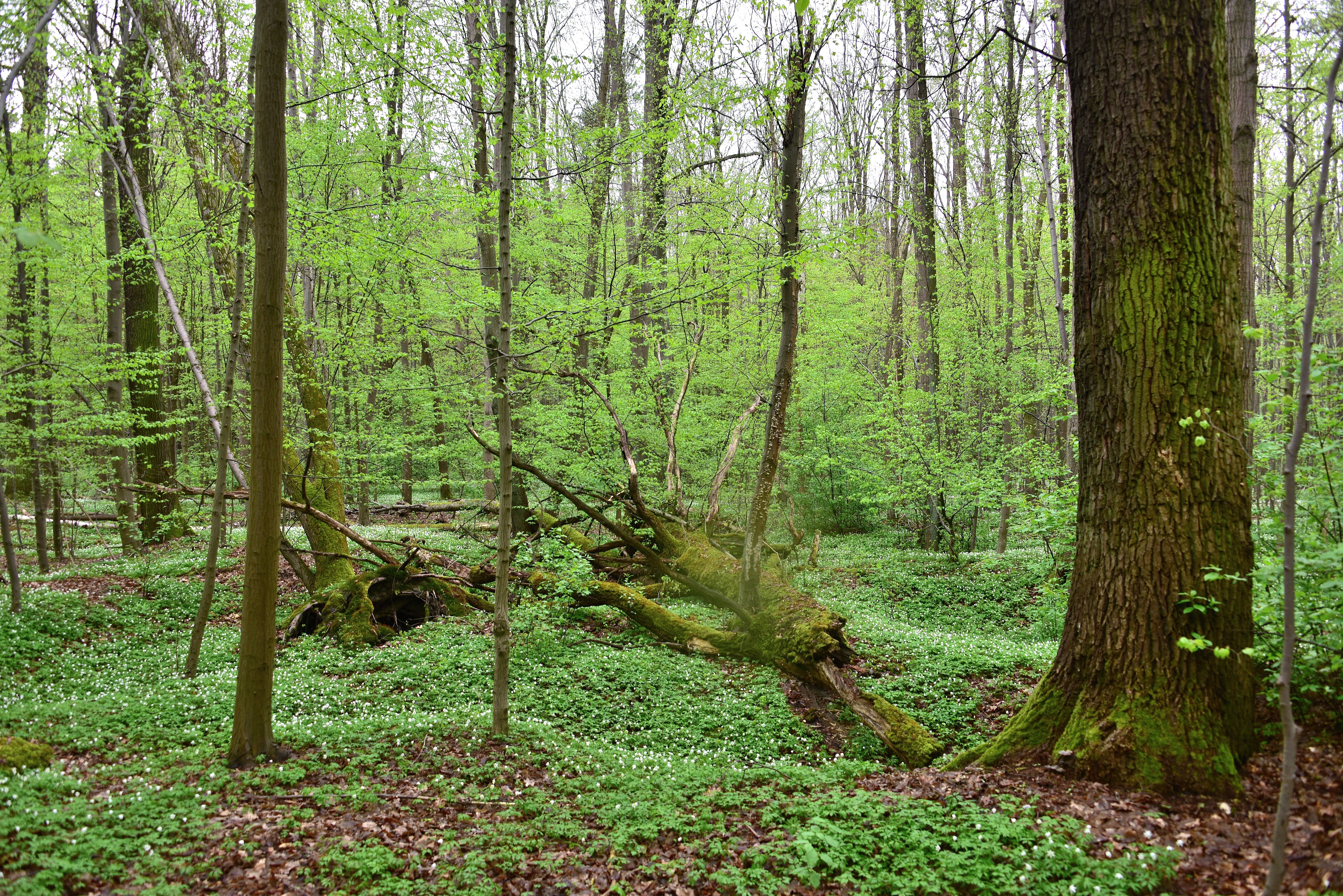
Kawęczyn natural reserve

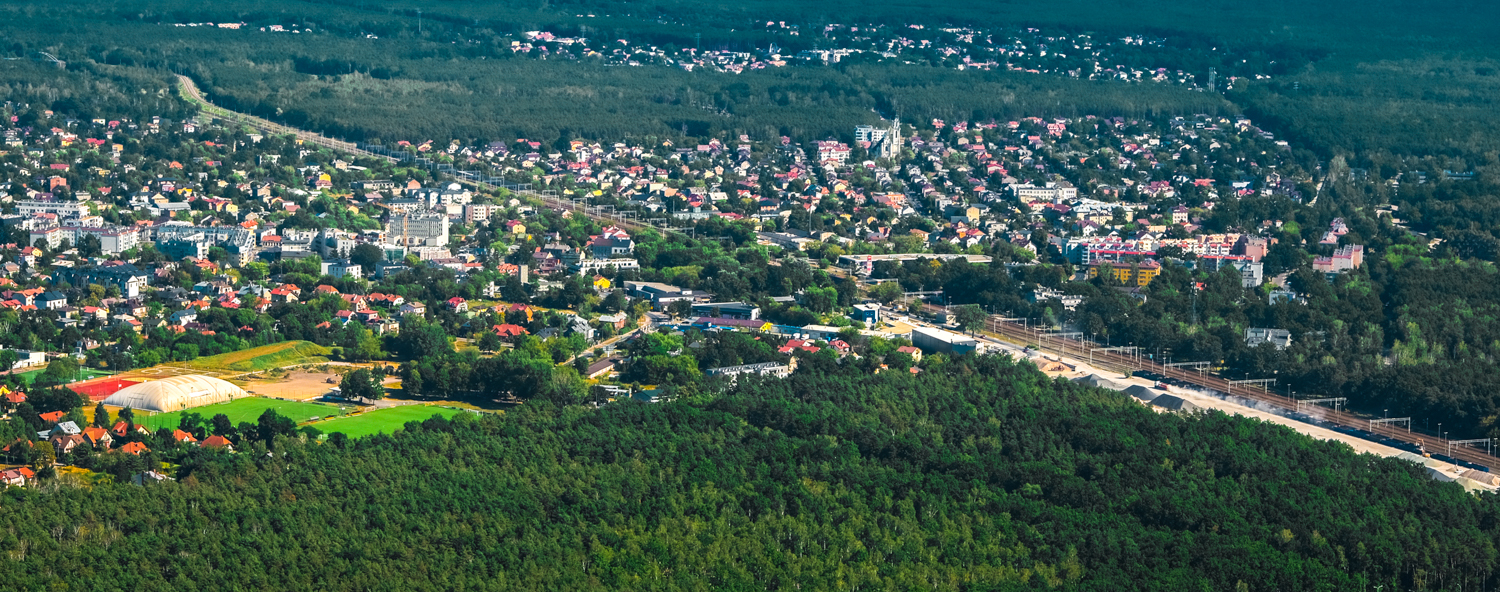
Kawęczyn natural reserve

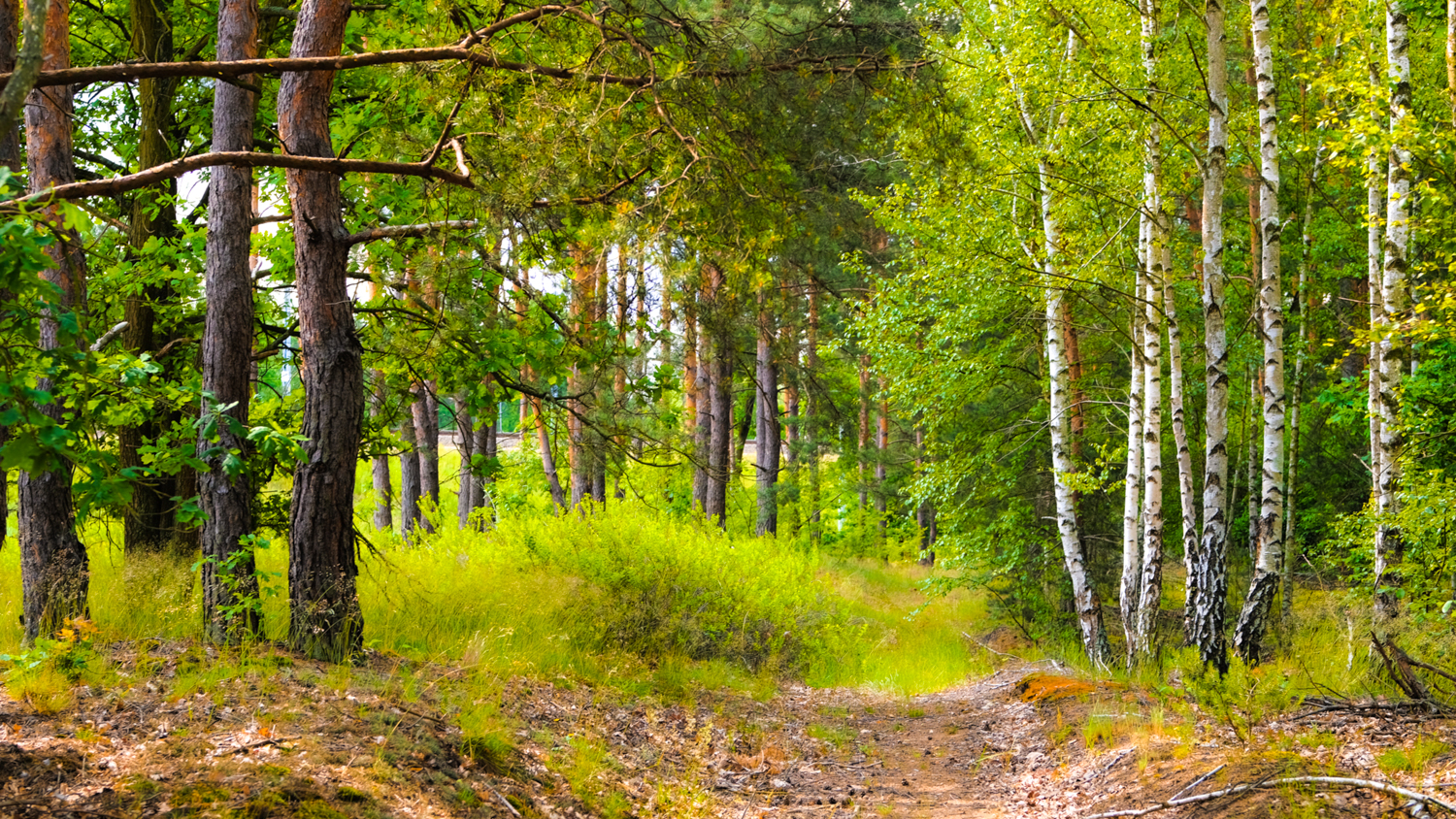
Okuniew-Remembertów Forests

== See also ==
- Attack on the NKVD Camp in Rembertów
