= Bust of Józef Szanajca =

Monument in Warsaw, Poland

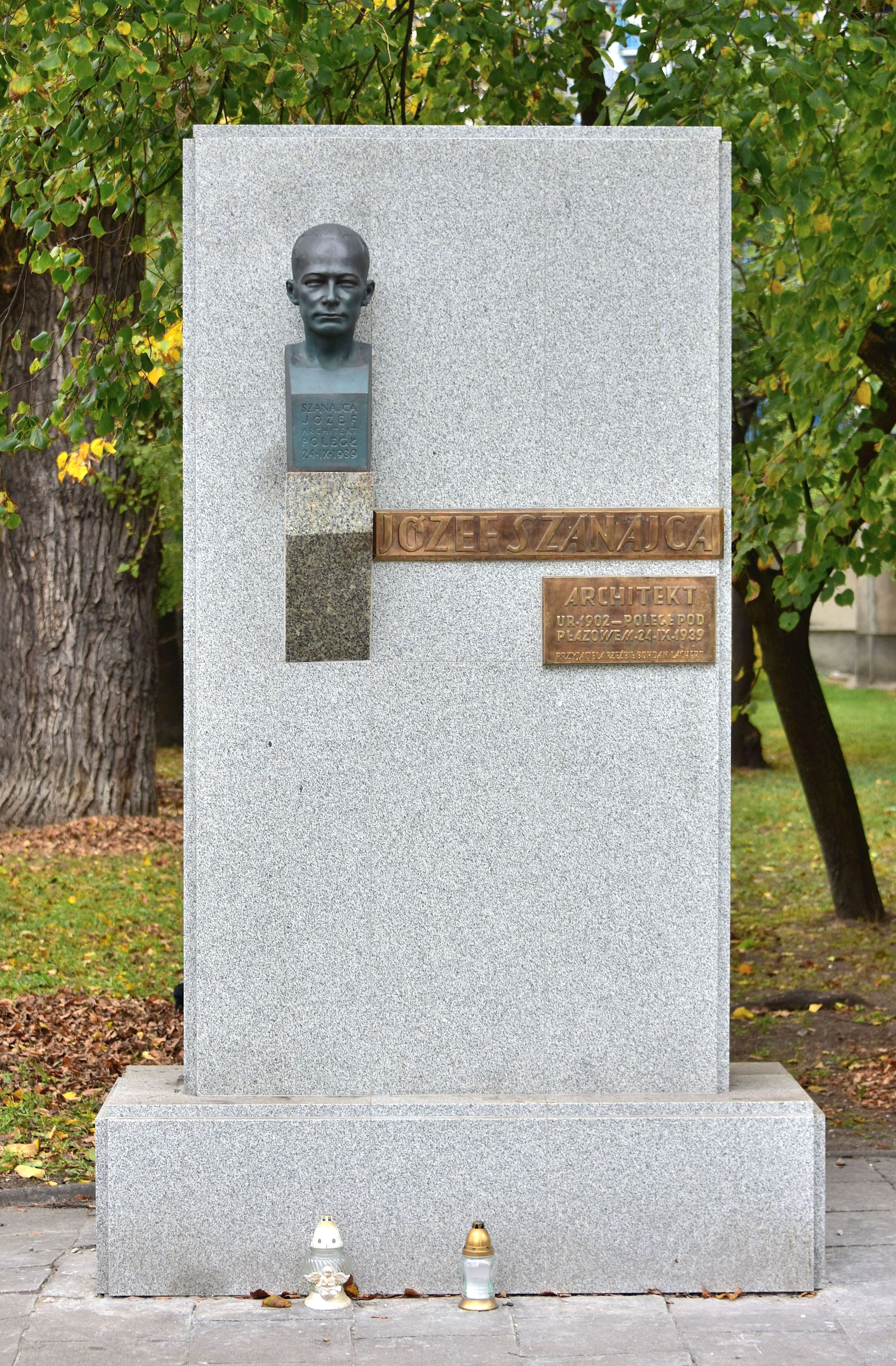
- The monument in 2019.
- Interactive map of Bust of Józef Szanajca
- Location: Sznajcy Street, Praga-North, Warsaw, Poland
- Coordinates: 52°15′39.40″N 21°01′27.10″E
- Designer: Bohdan Lachert
- Type: Bust
- Material: Iron (bust); granite (pedestal)
- Opening date: 24 September 1979
- Dedicated to: Józef Szanajca

The bust of Józef Szanajca (Polish pronunciation: [ˈju.zɛf ʂaˈnaj.t͡sa]; Polish: popiersie Józefa Szanajcy) is a monument in the city of Warsaw, Poland, placed at the corner of Sznajcy and Jagiellońska Street. It is located within the neighbourhood of New Praga, in the Praga-North district. The monument is dedicated to Józef Szanajca, a 19th- and 20th-century architect, and one of the most influential artists of the modernist movement in Poland. The original sculpture was designed by Bohdan Lachert in 1944, while the monument was unveiled on 24 September 1979.

== History ==
The bust sculpture of Józef Sznajca was originally commissioned by his friend Bohdan Lachert, from sculptor Zofia Trzcińska-Kamińska, in 1939. However, after Lachert deemed the received work unsatisfactory, he decided to made it himself. He worked on it between 1943 and 1944, in his house on Katowicka Street in the neighbourhood of Saska Kępa in Warsaw. Its original gypsum model remains in the collection of the Association of Polish Architects in the Konstanty Zamoyski Palace in Warsaw. The monument was unveiled on 24 September 1979. The original bust, cast in bronze in the Łopieński Brothers workshop, was stolen and replaced with an iron one instead.

== Design ==
The monument consists of a small iron bust of Józef Szanajca, installed on the side of a tall granite plinth. It features a plaque, with the following Polish inscription:

Polish inscription

Józef Szanajca
Architekt
Ur. 1902 – poległ pod
Płazowem 24.IX.1939
Przyjaciela rzeźbił Bohdan Lachert

Translation:
English translation

Józef Szanajca
Architect
Born in 1902, fell near
Płazów on 24 September 1939
Sculptured by his friend Bohdan Lachert
