= Architecture of Warsaw =

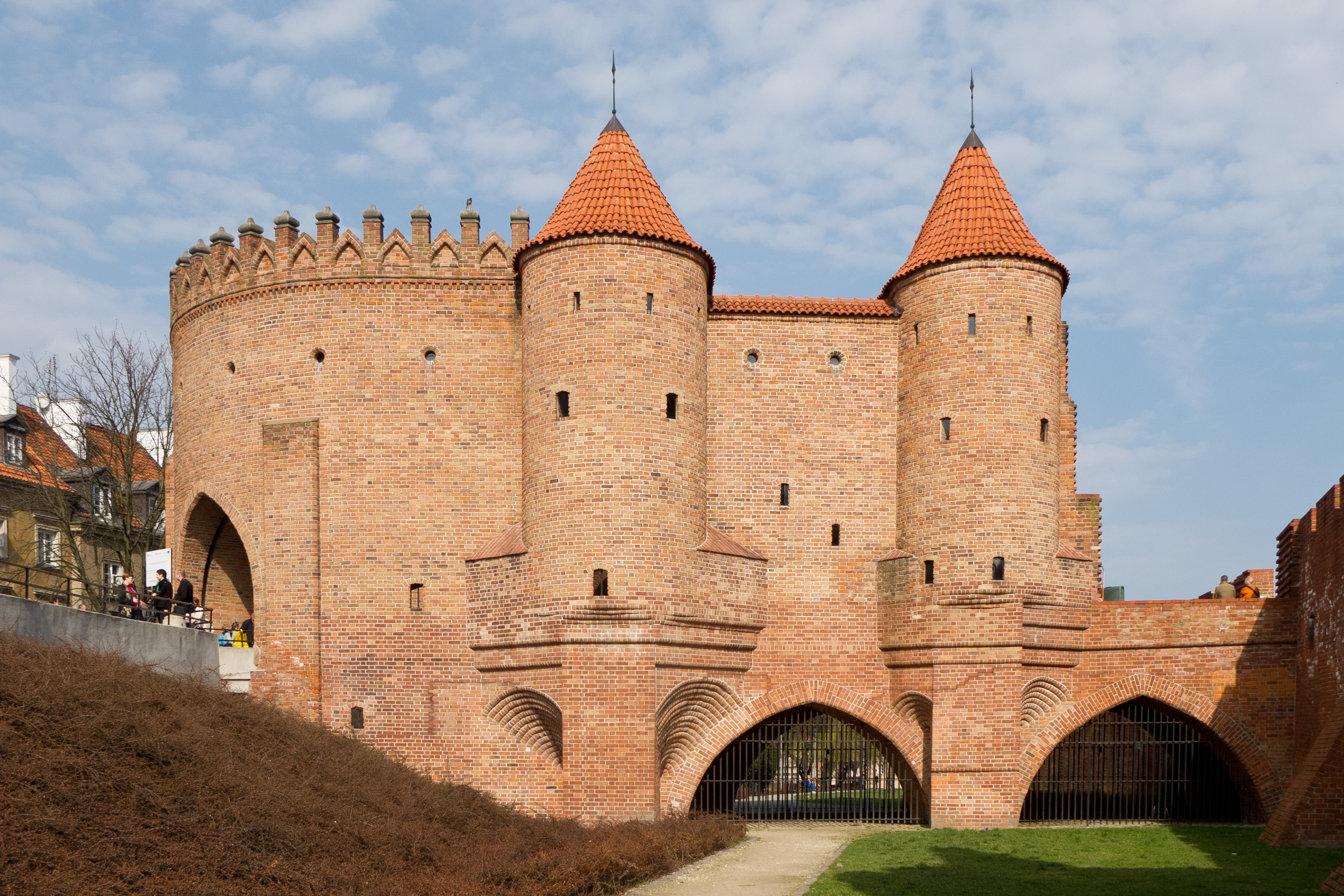
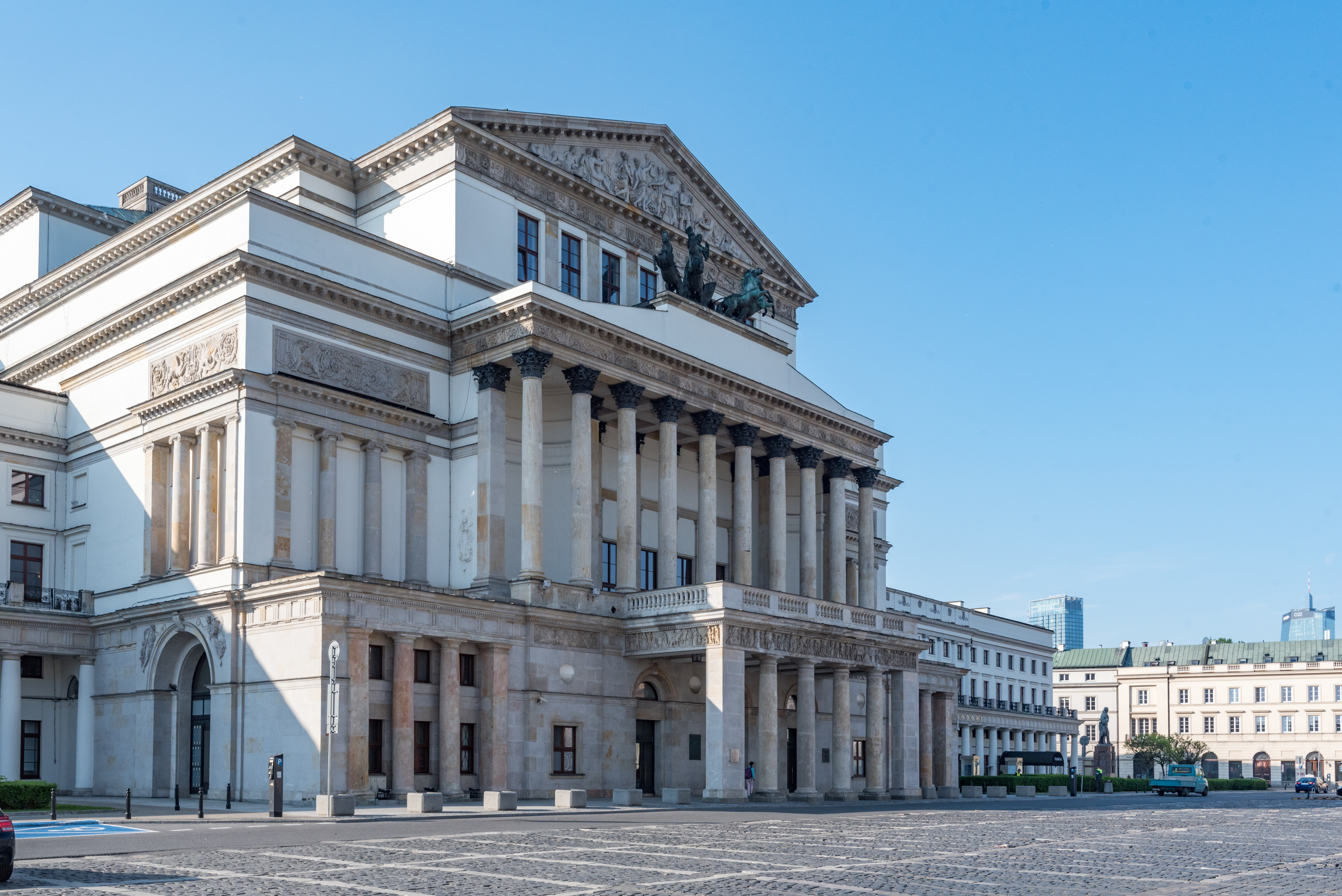
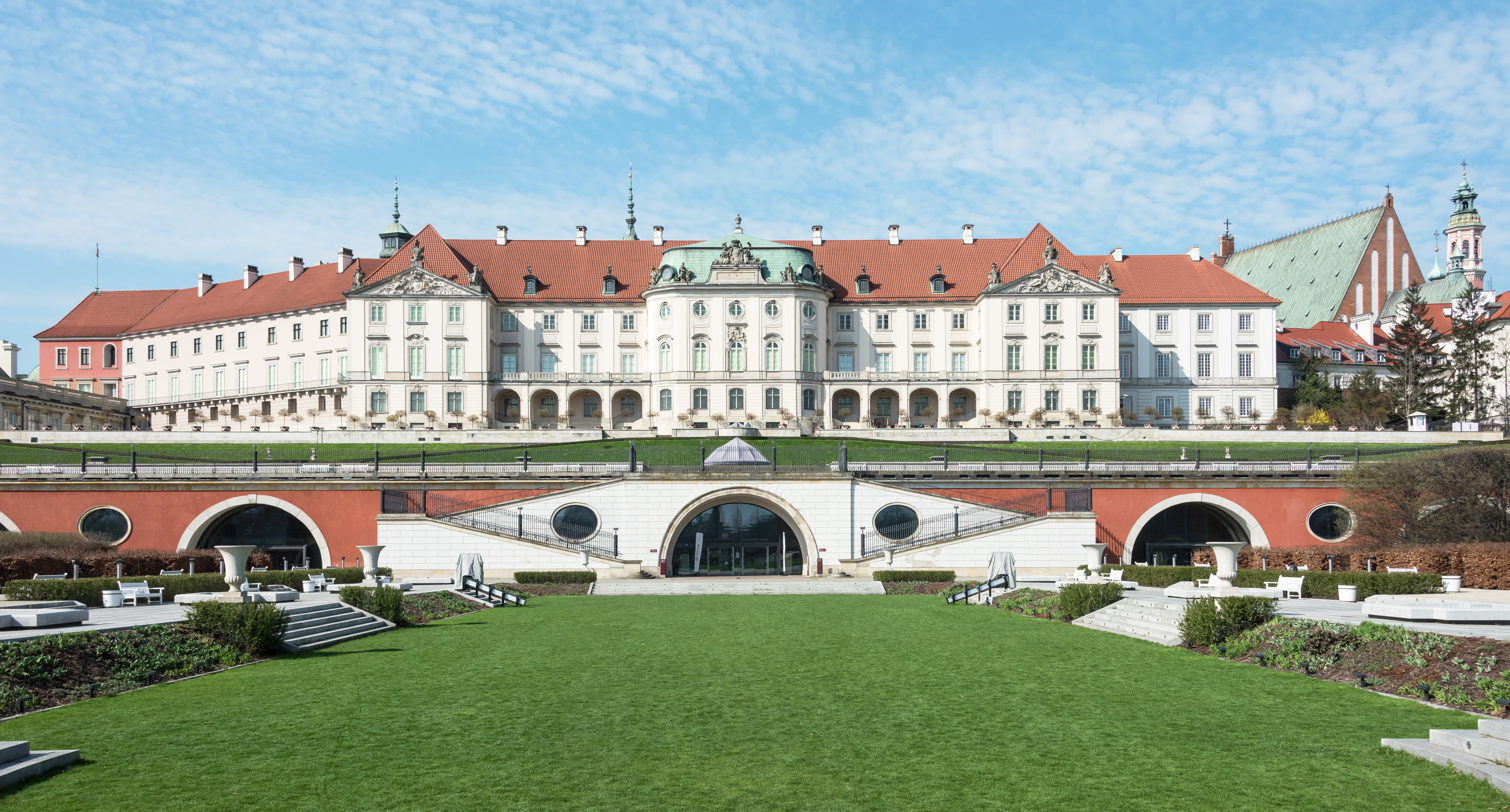
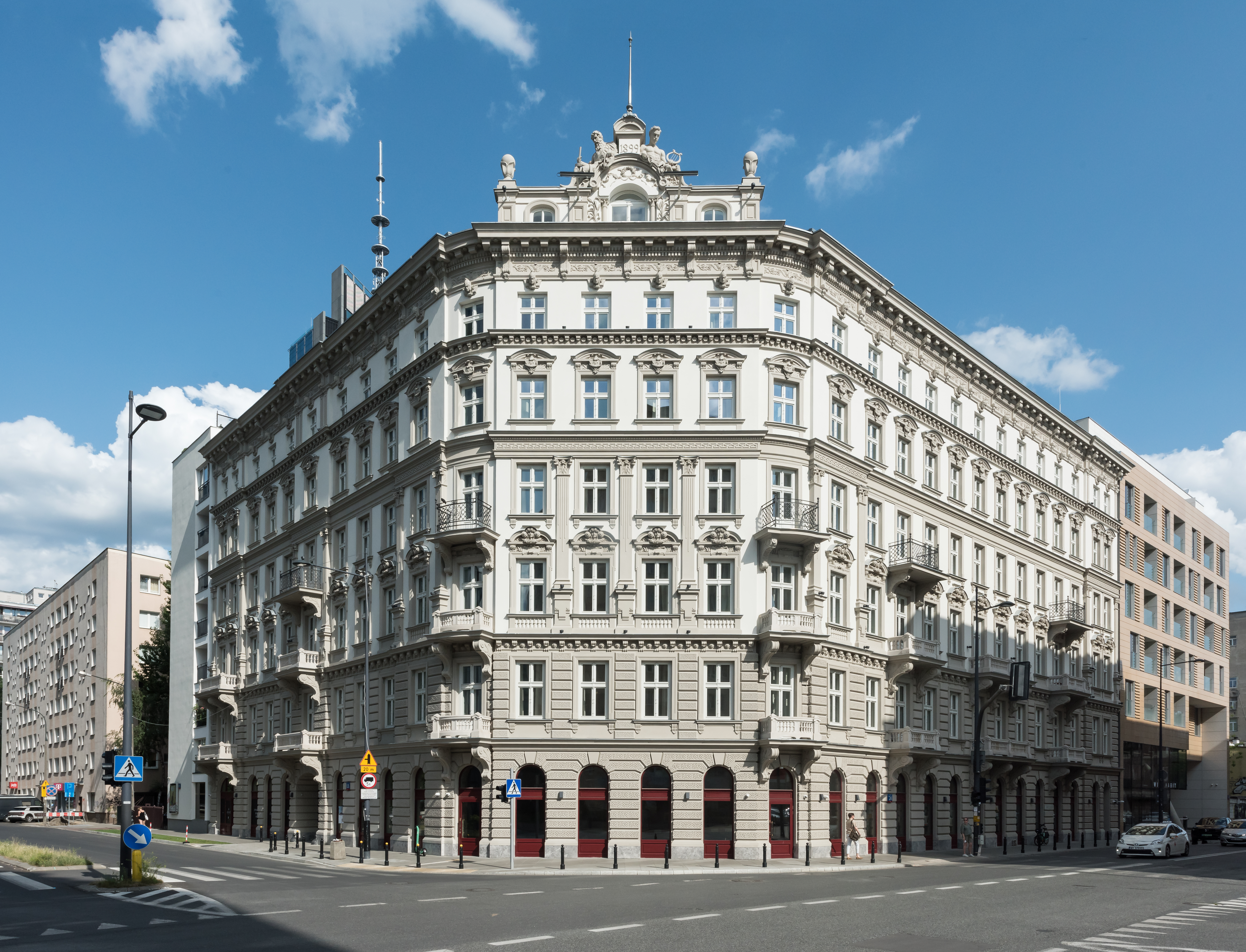
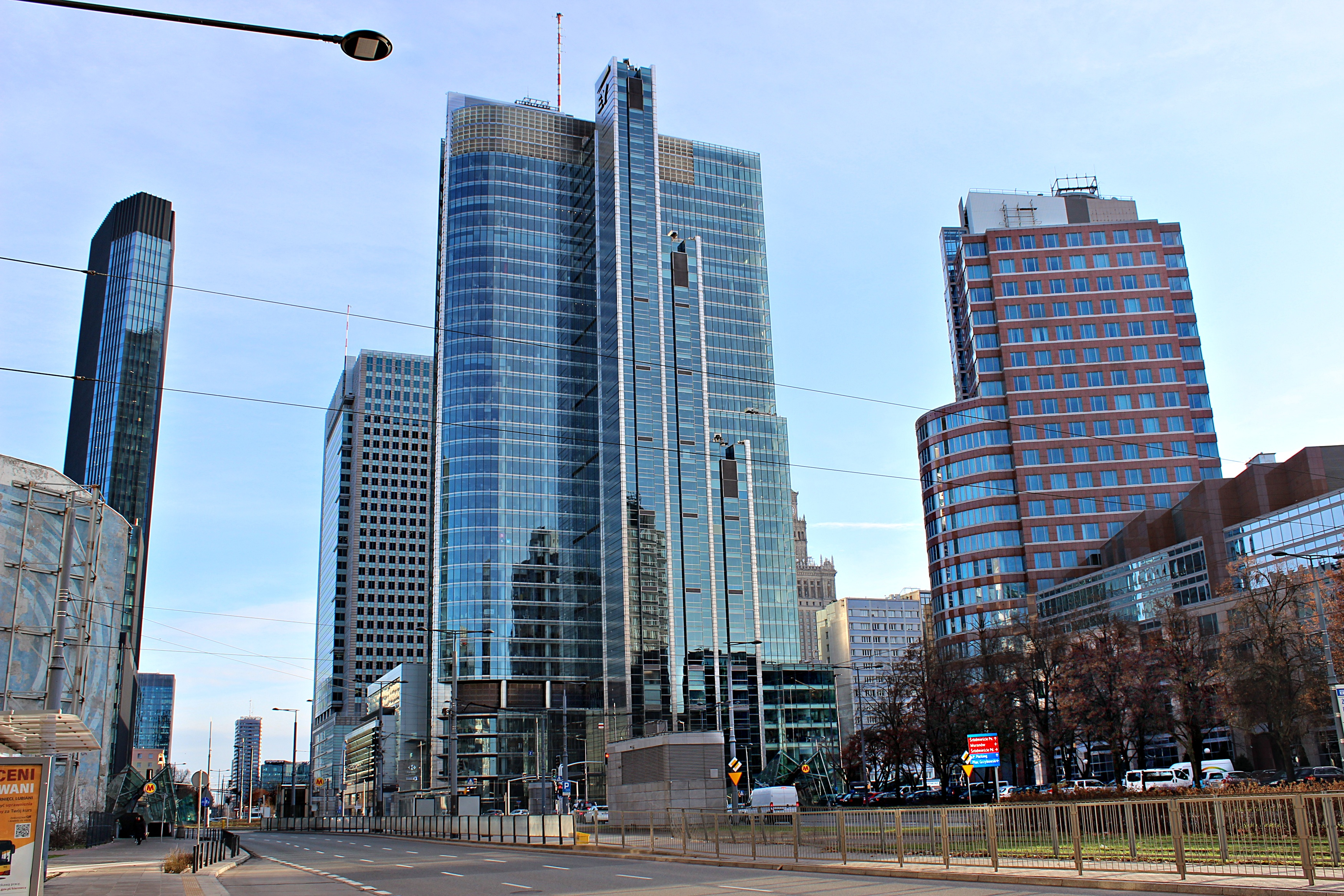
Clockwise from upper left: Warsaw Barbican, Grand Theatre, Wolf Krongold Townhouse, Downtown Warsaw, Royal Castle

The architecture of Warsaw has influenced and reflected the history of Polish architecture. The city of Warsaw features prominent buildings in a variety of styles by many important architects. Warsaw's palaces, churches and mansions display a richness of color and architectural details.

Buildings are representatives of nearly every European architectural style and historical period. The city has wonderful examples of architecture from the gothic, renaissance, baroque and neoclassical periods, all of which are located within easy walking distance of the town centre.

== Architecture by style ==
Gothic architecture is represented in the majestic churches but also at the burgher houses and fortifications. The most significant buildings are St. John's Cathedral (14th century), the temple is a typical example of the so-called Masovian gothic style, St. Mary's Church (1411), a town house of Burbach family (14th century), Gunpowder Tower (after 1379) and the Royal Castle Curia Maior (1407–1410).

The most notable examples of Renaissance architecture in the city are the house of Baryczko merchant family (1562), building called "The Negro" (early 17th century) and Salwator tenement (1632). The most interesting examples of mannerist architecture are the Royal Castle (1596–1619) and the Jesuit Church (1609–1626) at Old Town. Among the first structures of the early baroque the most important are St. Hyacinth's Church (1603–1639) and Zygmunt's Column (1644).

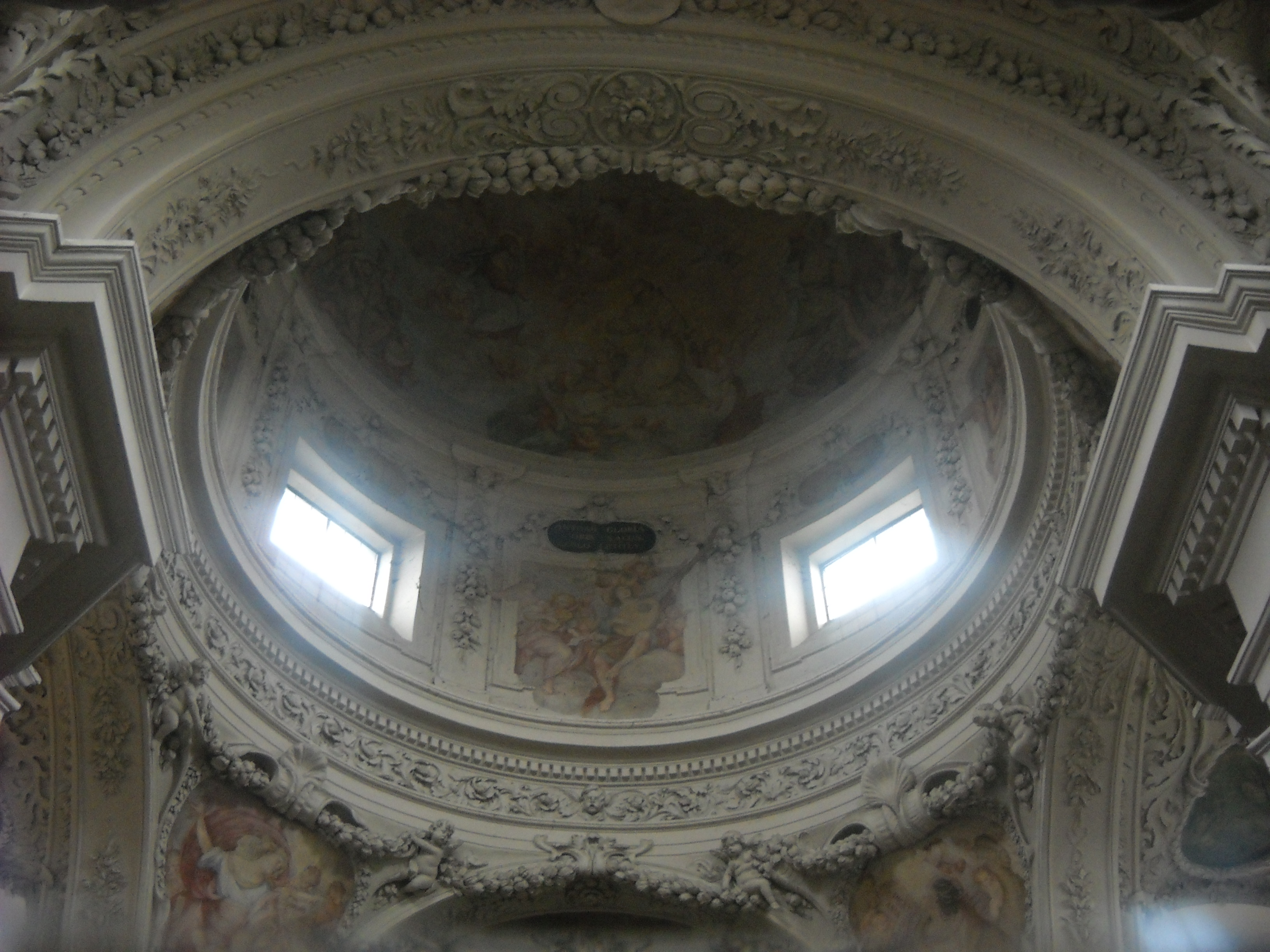
The dome of the Church of St. Anthony of Padua in Warsaw-Czerniaków, with profuse frescoes and stucco decorations, was constructed in 1690–1693.

Building activity occurred in numerous noble palaces and churches during the later decades of the 17th century. One of the best examples of this architecture are Krasiński Palace (1677–1683), Wilanów Palace (1677–1696) and St. Kazimierz Church (1688–1692). The unique character of Warsaw Baroque, which gradually influenced the architecture of the Polish–Lithuanian Commonwealth was a mixture of local traditions with Western European patterns. Late Baroque architecture with palaces merging Polish mansions of the aristocracy with side towers, Italian suburban villa and a French palace entre cour et jardin (between court and garden) with two oblong wings on each side of the cour d'honneur, funeral chapels, modelled after Sigismund's Chapel and attached to the church as well as Greek-cross plan churches, are present in Warsaw. The style was largely shaped by one individual Tylman Gamerski, showing Italian and Dutch influences. The most impressive examples of rococo architecture are Czapski Palace (1712–1721), Palace of the Four Winds (1730s) and Visitationist Church (façade 1728–1761).

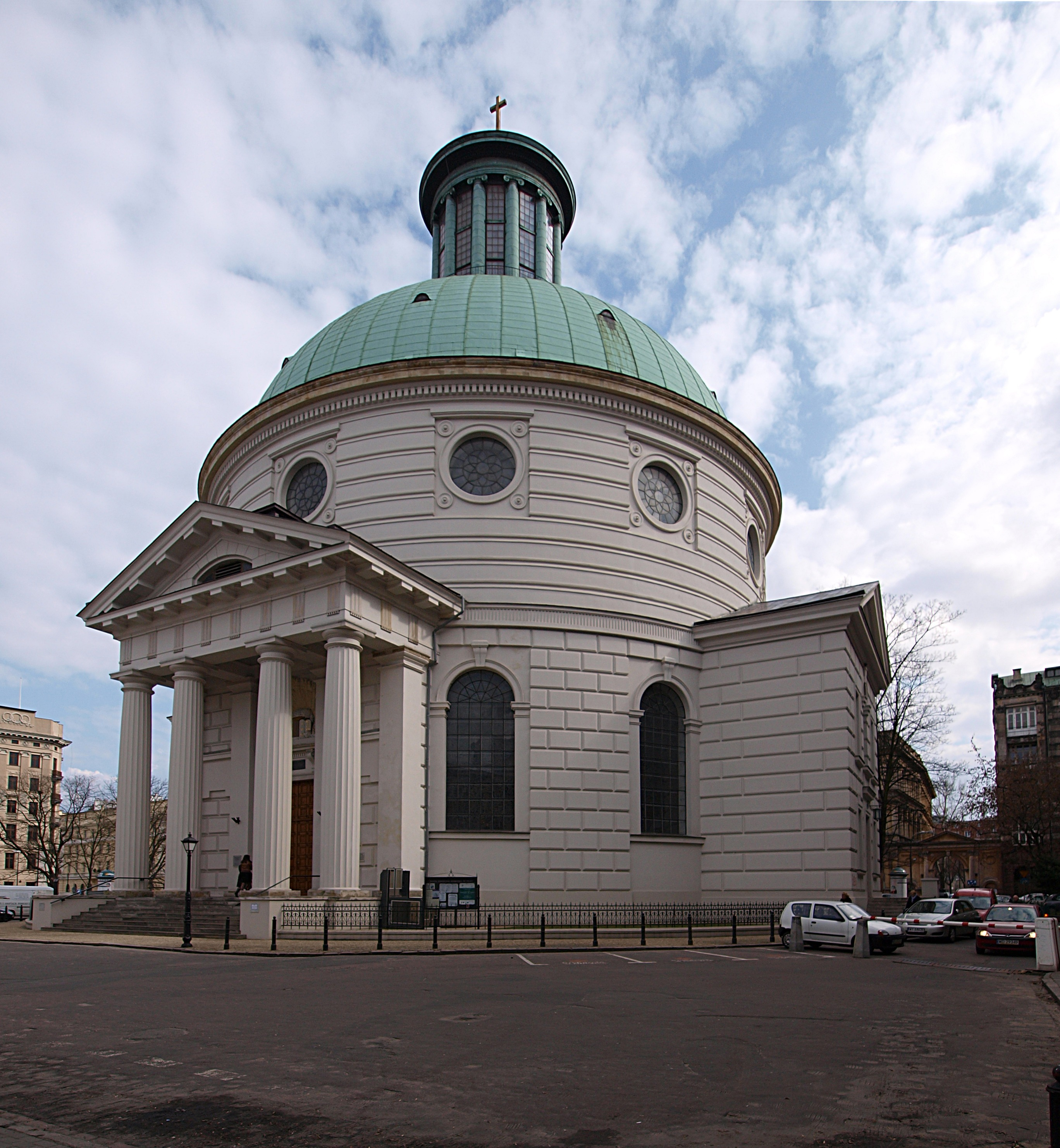
The Classical rotunda of the Holy Trinity Evangelical Church was constructed in 1777–1782.

The neoclassical architecture in Warsaw can be described by the simplicity of the geometrical forms teamed with a great inspiration from the Roman period. The first stage, called the Stanislavian style, followed by an almost complete inhibition and a period known as the Congress Kingdom classicism. The palladian patterns were independently interpreted by Szymon Bogumił Zug, who followed an influence of radical French classicism. A palladian by influence was also Piotr Aigner - author of the facade of St. Anne's Church in Warsaw (1786–1788) and St. Alexander Church (1818–1826). Palladian ideas were implemented in a popular type of a palace with a pillared portico. Some of the best examples of the neoclassical style are the Palace on the Water (rebuilt 1775–1795), Królikarnia (1782–1786), Carmelite Church (façade 1761–1783) and Evangelical Holy Trinity Church (1777–1782). The economic growth during the first years of Congress Poland caused a rapid rise architecture. The Neoclassical revival affected all aspects of architecture, the most notable are the Great Theater (1825–1833) and buildings located at Bank Square (1825–1828).

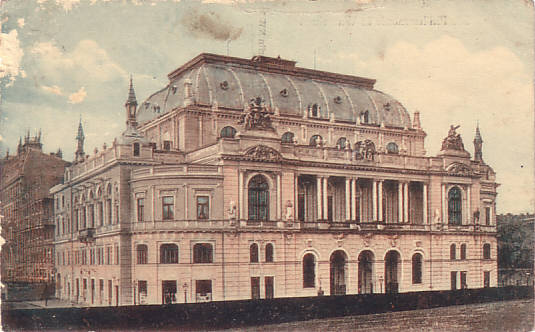
Warsaw Philharmony edifice in 1918. The building was destroyed in a German air raid on Warsaw in 1939 and it was rebuilt after the war in the socialist realism style.

Exceptional examples of the bourgeois architecture of the later periods were not restored by the communist authorities after the war (like mentioned Kronenberg Palace and Insurance Company Rosja building) or they were rebuilt in socialist realism style (like Warsaw Philharmony edifice originally inspired by Palais Garnier in Paris). Despite that the Warsaw University of Technology building (1899–1902) is the most interesting of the late 19th-century architecture. Lot of the 19th-century buildings is restored in Praga (Vistula's right bank), though they are in a pretty bad condition. Warsaw's municipal government authorities have decided to rebuild the Saxon Palace and the Brühl Palace, the most distinctive buildings in prewar Warsaw.

After the Warsaw area enlargement in 1916, an occasion was aroused to build new estates. Yet in 20's and 30's new workers' and villas' estates came into existence. Thanks of this the villas' estate was built in Saska Kępa. Most prewar building at this district was not destroyed during war. Nowadays still exists many examples of houses from interwar period, designed by notable architects, like Bohdan Pniewski, Bohdan Lachert, Józef Szanajca, Lucjan Korngold or Szymon and Helena Syrkus. The workers' estates were Ochota and Rakowiec, Koło (north-western part of Wola), Grochów (the centre of Praga Południe), Żoliborz. The villas' estates – Higher Mokotów (there lived President Starzyński), Czerniaków (north of Wilanów), Saska Kępa (between Poniatowski and Łazienkowski bridges) as well as Żoliborz. The Żoliborz estate (more accurately – the Old Żoliborz, i.e. the part of district around the Wilson Square) is an interesting example of an estate, where four groups of society lived next to each other: workers (Żoliborz Spółdzielczy, i.e. collective – the workers' part was a housing association), writers and periodists (Żoliborz Dziennikarski – periodical), state clerks (Żoliborz Urzędniczy – clerical) and army officers (Żoliborz Oficerski).

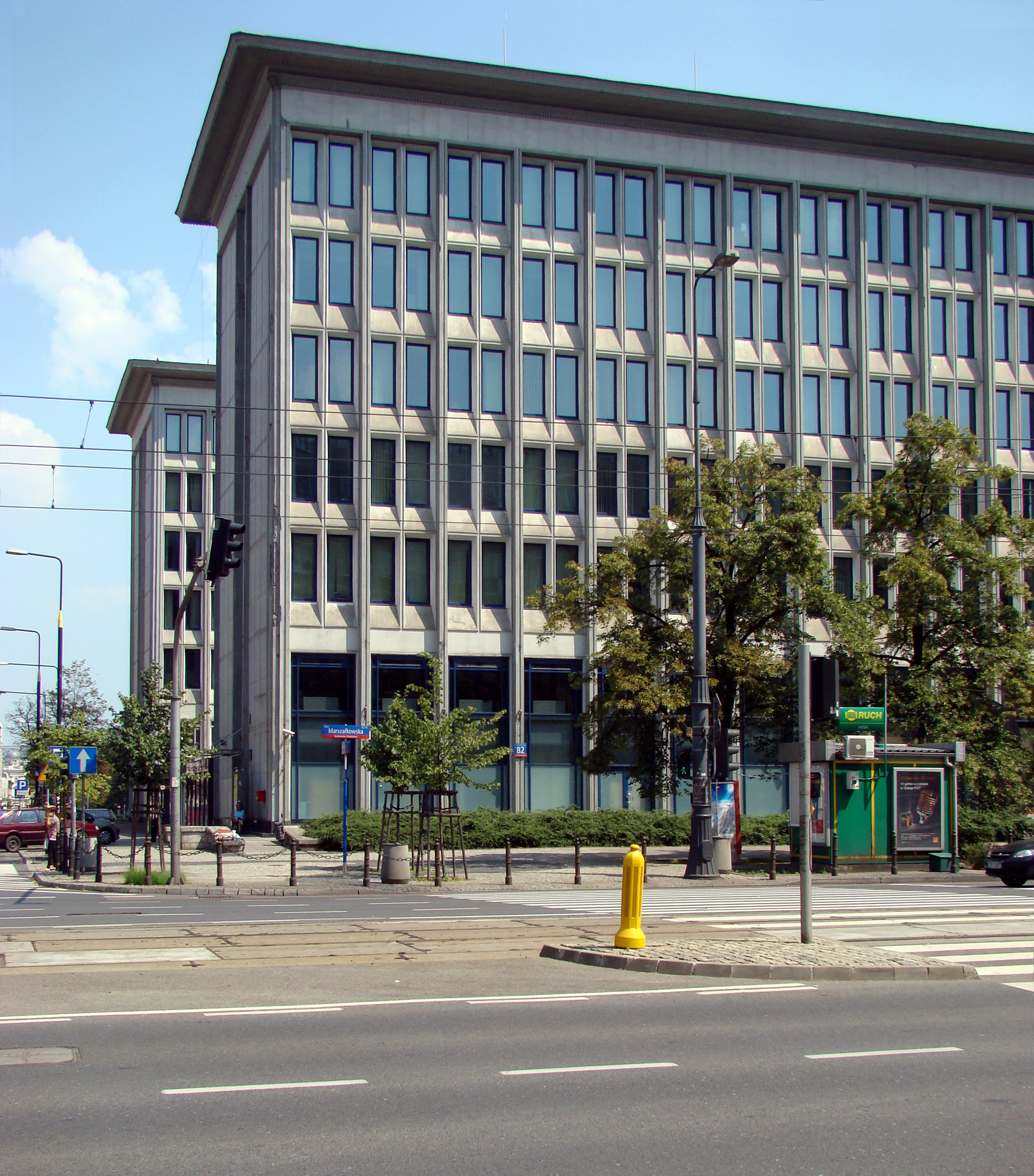
Former buildings of the Supreme Chamber of Control by Marek Leykam were constructed in 1947–1948.

Notable examples of contemporary architecture include the Palace of Culture and Science (1952–1955), a Soc-realist skyscraper located in the city centre, and the Constitution Square with its monumental Socialist realism architecture (MDM estate). The central part of the right-bank (east) Praga borough it is a place where very run-down houses stand right next to modern apartment buildings and shopping malls.

Like in all former communist countries, there are also several blockhouse estates in Warsaw. They were built between 1960 and 1985, mainly in the areas incorporated in 1951. The greatest are: Ursynów-Natolin, Bródno, Wawrzyszew (close to the Steel Industry), Bemowo, Gocław (at the right bank, between Łazienkowski and Siekierkowski bridges), Stegny (north-west of Wilanów), Tarchomin (north of Toruńska Road).

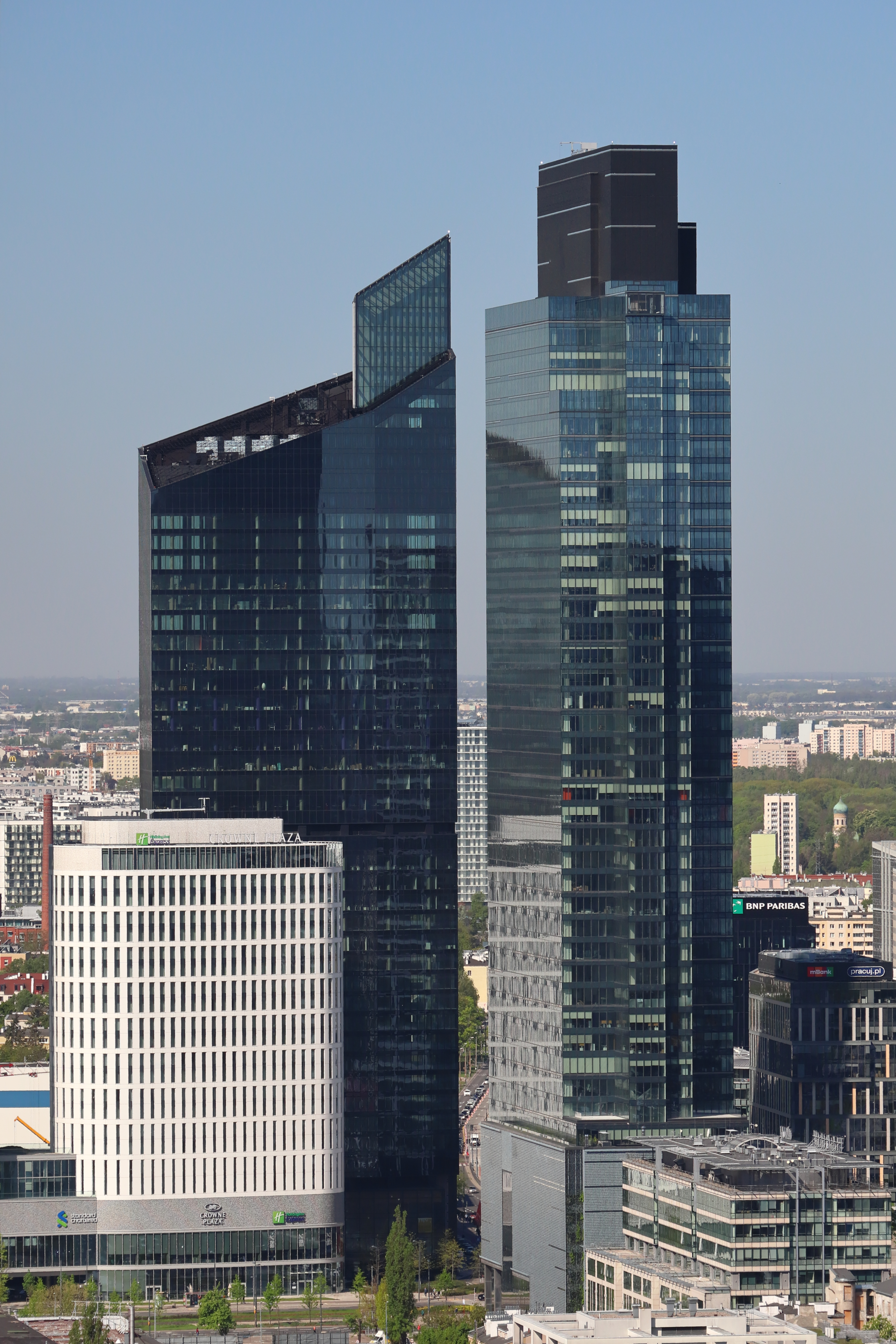
Modern skyscrapers, Skyliner (left), and Warsaw Unit (right)

Modern architecture in Warsaw is represented by the Metropolitan Office Building at Pilsudski Square by Lord Foster, Warsaw University Library (BUW) by Marek Budzyński and Zbigniew Badowski, featuring a garden on its roof and view of the Vistula River, Rondo 1 office building by Skidmore, Owings and Merrill, Golden Terraces, consisting of seven overlapping domes retail and business centre and skyscraper Złota 44 by Daniel Libeskind.

It has been noted that Warsaw, together with Frankfurt, London, Paris, Moscow, Istanbul and Rotterdam is one of the tallest cities in Europe. Warsaw is ranked as 48th in the List of cities with the most skyscrapers around the world. It is also ranked as 78th in The World's List of cities with the most buildings taller than 100m with a number of 16. Of the 20 buildings in Poland which are 100-meters high or above, 16 are situated in Warsaw (of which the second one is Sky Tower in Wrocław). The tallest structure, the centrally located Palace of Culture and Science, is the European Union's seventh-tallest building: 230.7 metres (756.9 ft) with the TV-tower, 188 metres (616.8 ft) to the roof. The first skyscrapers in Poland were also built in Warsaw. The first was the building of the Polish Telegraph Company (1908 – so-called PASTa) – 51 metres (167 ft), probably the highest building in the Russian Empire at that time. The second was the building of the Insurance Company Prudential House (1934) – 66 metres (217 ft). Up to date, apart from the Palace of Culture and Science, the highest buildings in Warsaw are: Warsaw Trade Tower (1999, 208 metres (682 ft)), InterContinental Warszawa (2003, 164 metres (538 ft)) Rondo 1 (2006, 159 metres (522 ft)), Warsaw Financial Center (1999, 144 metres (472 ft)).

Now, the Palace of Culture and Science height is surpassed by Varso Tower.

== See also ==
- Places of worship in Warsaw
- Tourist attractions in Warsaw
- List of tallest buildings in Poland
