= Warsaw Gallery Weekend =

Warsaw Gallery Weekend (WGW) – A yearly artistic event gathering selected private art galleries and organizing exhibitions and event.

Warsaw Gallery Weekend Warsaw Gallery Weekend is modeled on similar initiatives actual event in other important artistic centers, such as the Berlin Gallery Weekend. During three days, the participated galleries present exhibitions under a common banner, organized meetings and other additional events. Warsaw Gallery Weekend cooperates with public institutions, including from Zachęta or Museum of Modern Art in Warsaw.

The first edition was held in 2011 under the name "Where is art". From 2012, the event has been named Warsaw Gallery Weekend and it takes place on the last weekend of September including Friday.

== Editions ==
=== 2011 ===
The first edition of the Warsaw Gallery Weekend took place on 22–23 September 2011 under the banner of "Where is art".

The following galleries participated in the first edition:: appendix2, Asymetria, BWA Warszawa, Czarna, Archeologia photography Foundation, Foksal Gallery Foundation, Profile Foundation, Heppen Transfer, Bocheńska Gallery, Kolonie, Le Guern, Leto, lokal_30, Galeria m2, Piktogram/BLA, Raster, Starter.

=== 2012 ===
Warsaw Gallery Weekend 2012 took place on 28, 29 and 30 September.

The following galleries participated in the second edition: Asymetria, Bohenska Gallery, BWA Warszawa, Czarna, Czułość, Archeologia photography Foundation, Foksal Gallery Foundation, Profile Foundation, Galeria m2, Kolonie, Le Guern, Leto, lokal_30, Pikotgram/BLA, Propaganda, Raster, Starter.

=== 2013 ===
Warsaw Gallery Weekend 2013 took place on 27, 28 and 29 September.

In the second edition, the following galleries took part: Aleksander Bruno, Asymetria, Bohenska Gallery, BWA Warszawa, Czułość, Dawid Radziszewski, Archeologia photography Foundation, Foksal Gallery foundation, Profile Foundation, Galeria m2, Le Guern, Leto, lokal_30, Pikotgram/BLA, Propaganda, Raster, Starter, Stereo.

=== 2014 ===
The fourth edition of Warsaw Gallery Weekend brought organizational changes, mainly in the composition of the organizational team.

In 2014, the following galleries participated in the WGW: Asymetria, galeria Aleksander Bruno, BWA Warszawa, Czułość, Dawid Radziszewski, Archeologia photography Foundation, Arton Foundation, Foksal Gallery Foundation, Profile Foundation, Galeria Le Guern, Galeria m2, Kasia Michalski Gallery, Kohana, Leto, lokal_30, Lookout Gallery, Monopol, Piktogram, Pola Magnetyczne, Propaganda, Raster, Starter, Stereo, and the guest gallery Svit from Prague, Czech Republic.

WGW 2014 was nominated for the Gazety Wyborczej Award.

=== 2015 ===
The fifth edition of the Warsaw Gallery Weekend has been recognized as the largest of all and took place on 25, 26, 27 September 2015.

In 2015, the following galleries participated in the event: Asymetria, BWA Warszawa, Czułość, Dawid Radziszewski, Fundacja Archeologia photography Foundation, Arton Foundation, Foksal Gallery Foundation, Profile Foundation, Galeria Le Guern, Galeria m2, Kasia Michalski Gallery, Kohana, Leto, lokal_30, Lookout Gallery, Monopol, Piktogram, Pola Magnetyczne, Propaganda, Raster, Starter, Stereo.

The organizers were Michał Kaczyński from the Raster gallery, Marta Kołakowska from the Leto gallery, Justyna Kowalska from BWA Warsaw and Jacek Sosnowski from the Propaganda gallery.
