= Bebrene Manor =

Manor in Latvia

- Bebrenes muiža
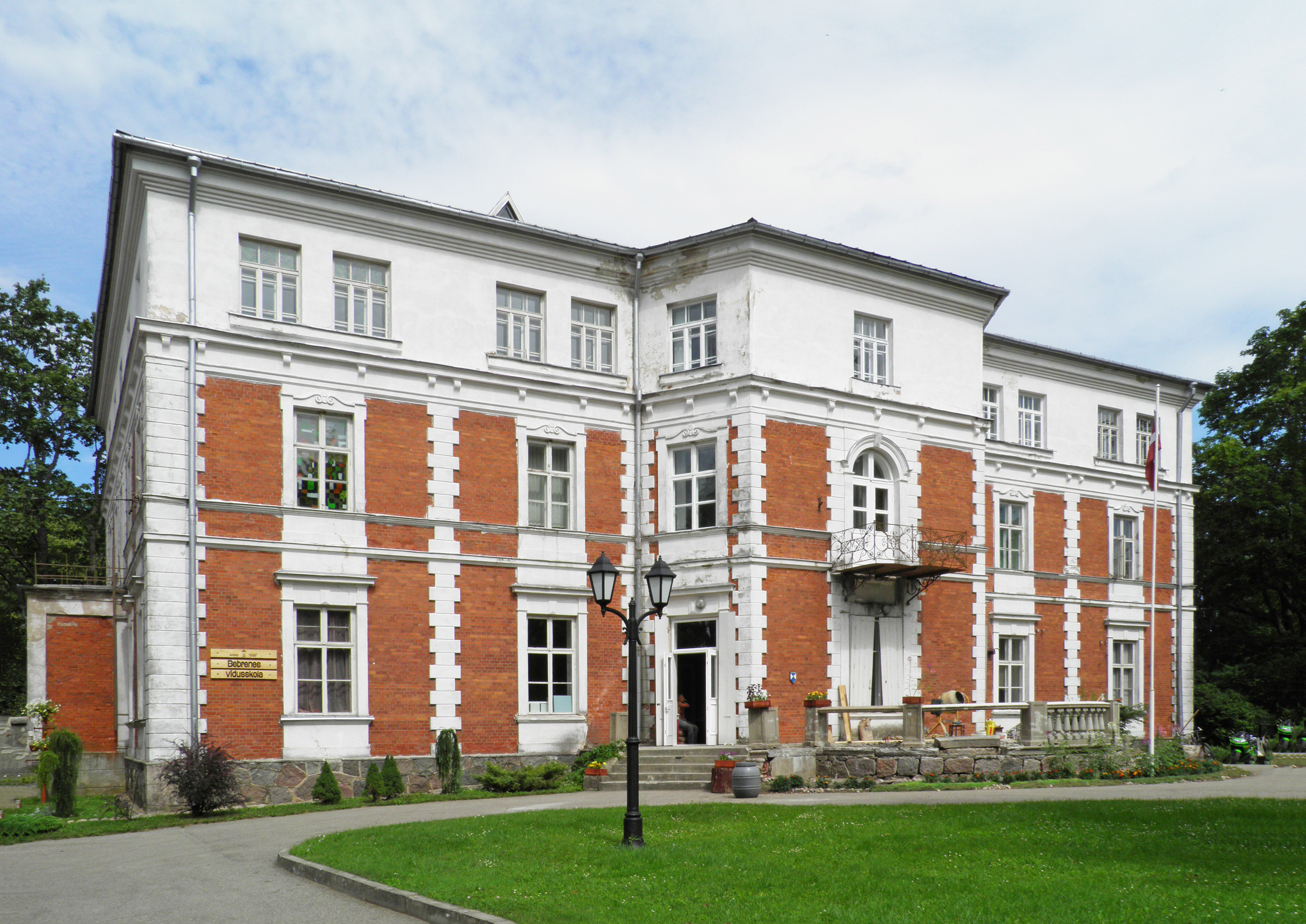
- Bebrene Manor House

- Location within Latvia

General information
- Architectural style: French neo-Renaissance
- Location: Bebrene, Bebrene Parish, Augšdaugava Municipality, Latvia
- Coordinates: 56°4′5.75″N 26°7′54.24″E
- Completed: 1896
- Client: Stanisław Kazimierz Plater-Zyberk

Design and construction
- Architect: Leandro Marconi

Bebrene Manor (Latvian: Bebrenes muiža, German: Rittergut Bewern, Polish: Dwór w Bebrene) is a manor house in Bebrene, Bebrene Parish, Augšdaugava Municipality, in the Selonia region of Latvia. Commissioned by Count Stanisław Kostka Plater-Zyberk and built in French neo-Renaissance style in the late 19th century by the Polish-Italian architect Leandro Marconi, the Bebrene Palace complex is located in a park, one of the most expressive landscaped parks of the English style in Latvia.

The building currently houses the Bebrene secondary school.

== History ==
The first manor was built at the beginning of the Livonian Order. In 1562 the manor fell into the hands of Kaspar Syberg and his family, who ruled in Bebrene until the beginning of the 19th century. On 6 January 1803 Count Michał Broel-Plater (1777-1862), married Izabela Helena Syberg zu Wischling (1785-1849), and adopted her name, and from then on until 1920 the estate belonged to the Plater-Zyberk family.

The current French neo-Renaissance manor house built in rectangular form was commissioned by Count Stanisław Kazimierz Plater-Zyberk (1823-1895) according to the design by Polish Leandro Marconi and completed in 1896 after the count's death. Originally it had two stories, but in the 1960s a third floor was added.

== Description ==
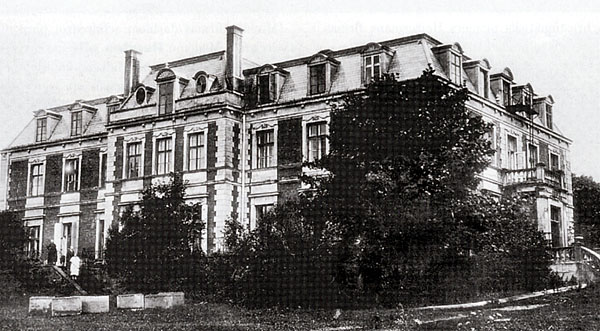
Bebrene Manor in the early 20th century.

The main façade in the center of the building was decorated with three polygonal openings, adjoining a terrace with stairs on either side. Above the entrance there is a small balcony on the second floor. Along the main façade a second series of three openings were built into the mezzanine. Also adjacent to the wide terrace, the ground level is suspended above a stone floor.

The salient point of the manor is its hall, located behind the entrance door at the western end of the palace. It is decorated with crystal chandeliers, and antique furniture imported from Paris. Two lounges and a library with marble fireplaces, oval table and chairs in the style of Louis XV. To the right of the door, there is a small passage which leads to a large saloon. The manor also has a large library located left of the eastern main entrance. The second floor is reached by stairs through the corridor in the lobby. The dining room has an adjacent pantry containing stairs to the basement of the palace where an underground corridor leads to the kitchen.

Bebrene park was designed as an English-American landscaped park. The complex includes a part of the original palace gates, an estate manager's house, a kitchen block, another house above the basement built in 1836, and stables. To the present day, it is partially preserved with an underground passage from the palace cellar to the kitchen block.

== See also ==
- List of palaces and manor houses in Latvia
