= Foksal Street =

Street in Warsaw, Poland

Foksal
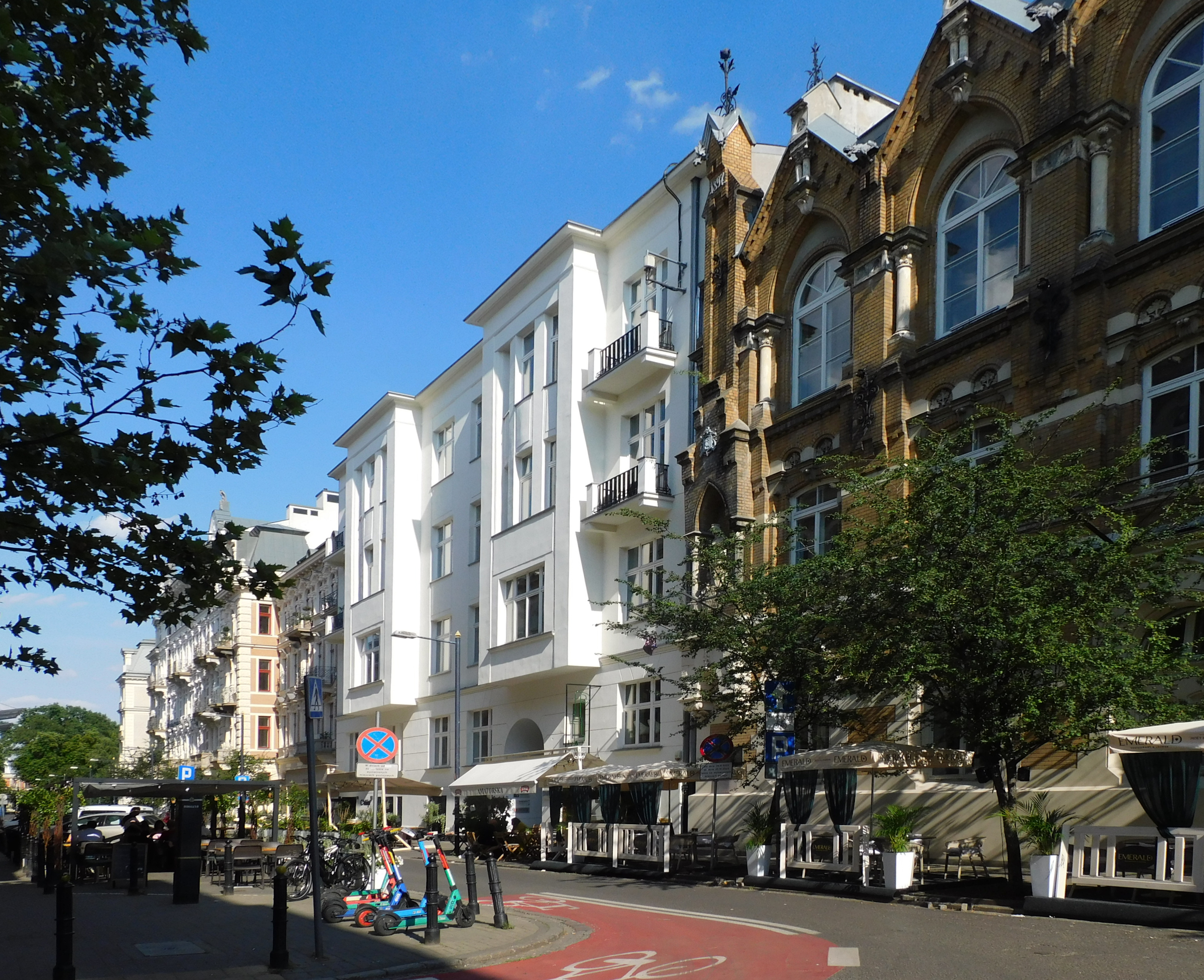
- View of Foksal Street, 2023
- Type: Street
- Length: 285 metres (0.177 mi)
- Location: Downtown, Warsaw, Poland
- Coordinates: 52°14′02″N 21°01′18″E
- Major junctions: In descending order: Nowy Świat Street, Gałczyńskiego, Kopernika, Krywulta.

Construction
- Inauguration: 15 May 1776 (as Foksal Gardens)

Other
- Known for: historic tenements, pubs, bars, restaurants

Foksal Street (Polish: ulica Foksal; from Vauxhall) is a street in central Warsaw, Poland. Situated within the Śródmieście (Downtown) borough, it extends from Nowy Świat to the Zamoyski Palace and is a dead end street. Much of the buildings and edifices in the surrounding area date back to the 19th century, including tenements and palatial residences near its end.

== Name ==
The contemporary polonised term "Foksal" was directly derived from the Vauxhall Gardens at Vauxhall, an area of Central London in Great Britain. The street was once an alley acting as the central axis of a pleasure garden designated for recreational use and exhibitions. In 1934, the name was changed to Pieracki Street, after Bronisław Pieracki, Minister of the Interior, who was assassinated there by the Organization of Ukrainian Nationalists in 1934. Under the Polish People's Republic, the name was changed to 'Yugoslavian Youth' (ulica Młodzieży Jugosłowiańskiej), but reverted to the original Foksal in around 1950 after Yugoslavia's split with the Eastern Bloc (Tito–Stalin split).

== History ==
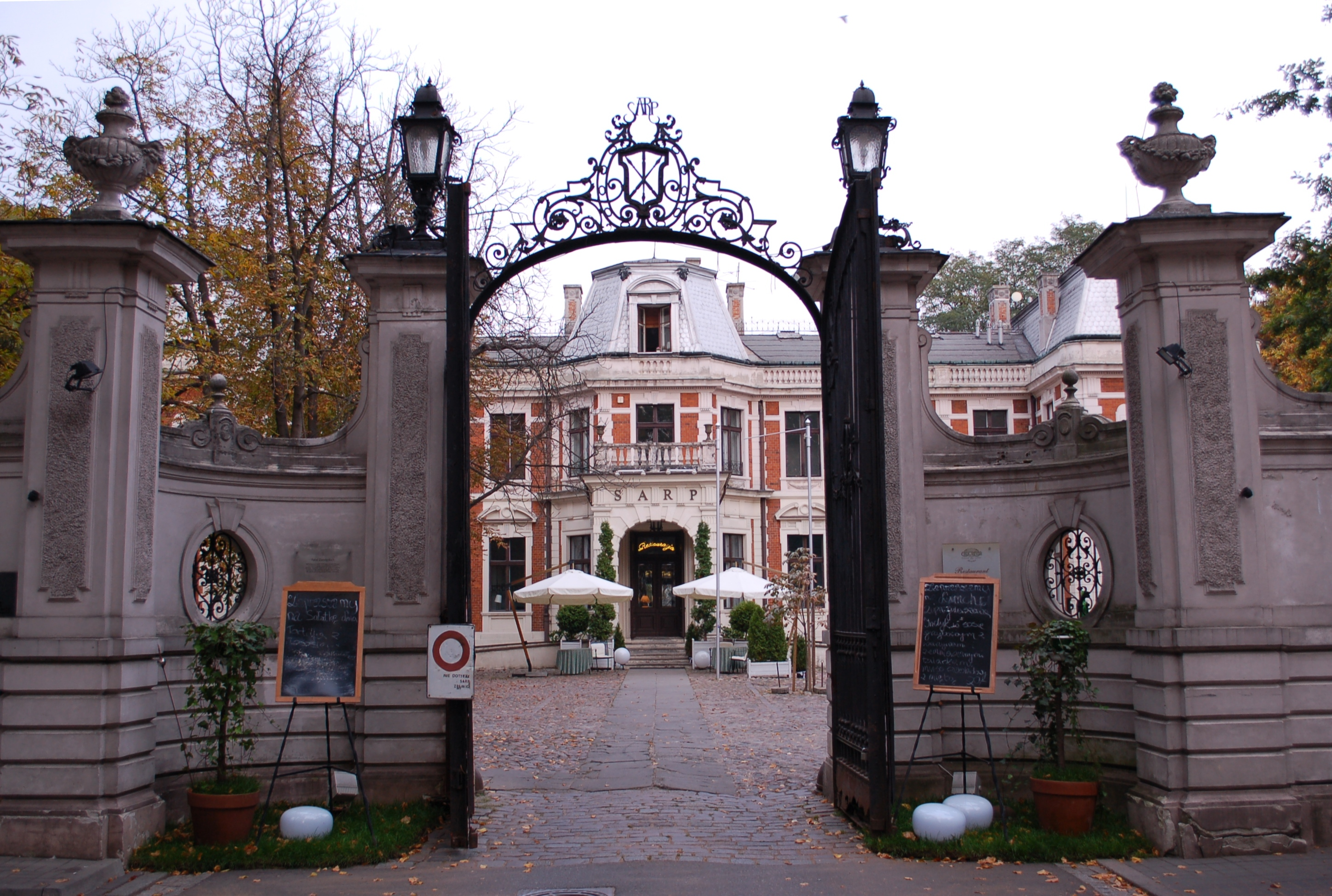
Konstanty Zamoyski Palace, 1875–1877.

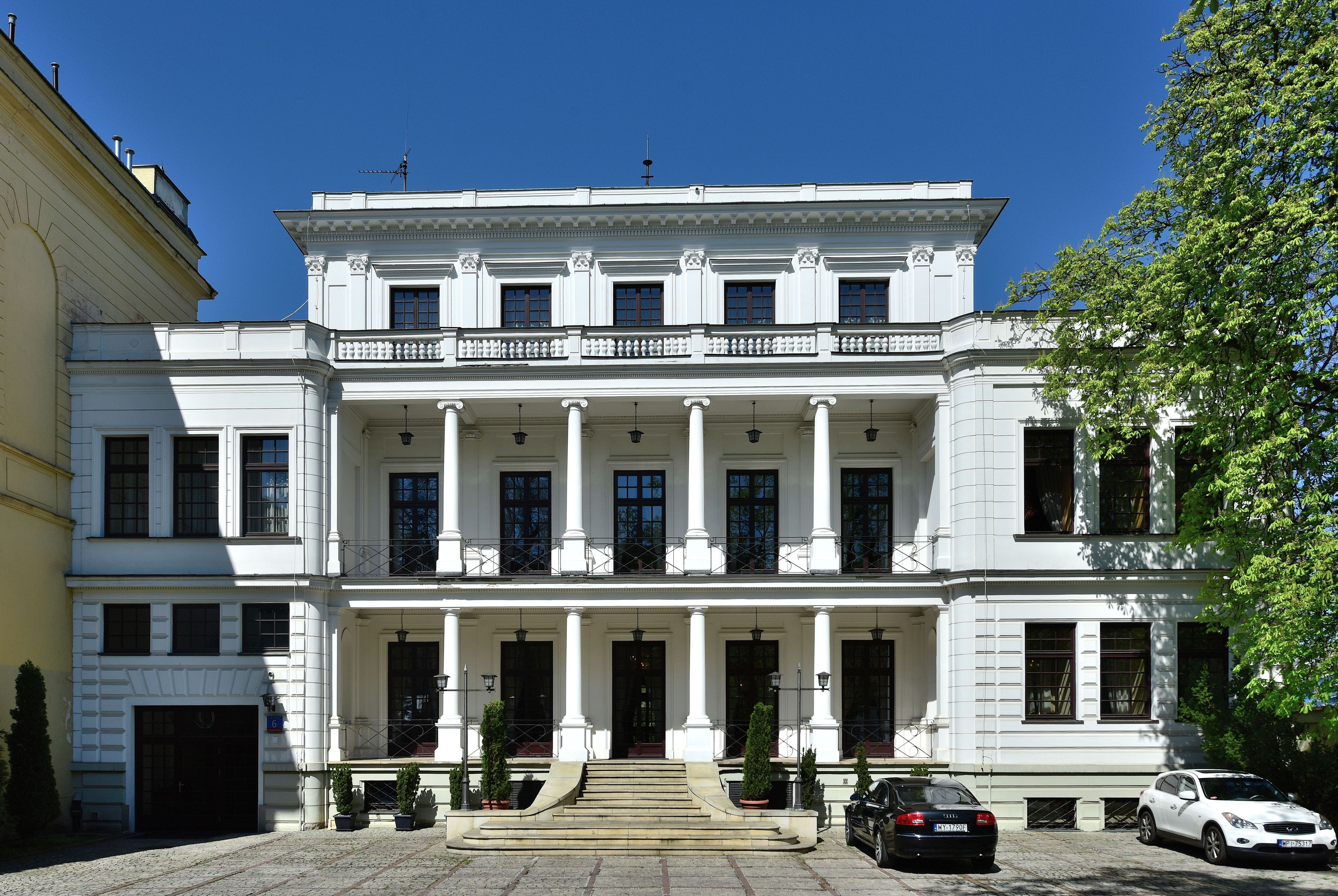
Przeździecki Palace, 1878–1879, modified 1951–1953.

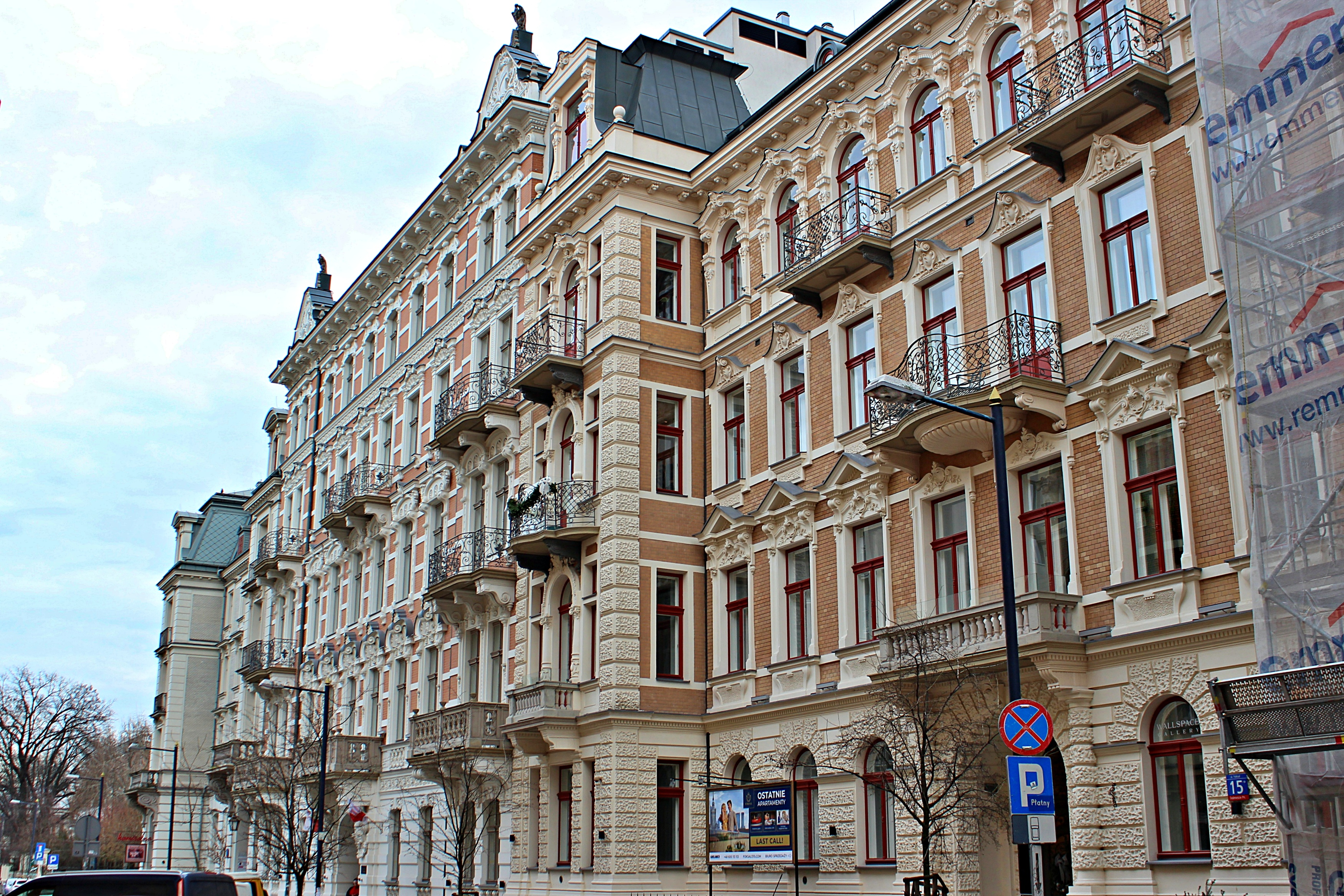
Tenements at Foksal 13 and 15, 1895–1898, following their restoration completed in 2020.

=== 18th century ===
The land now occupied by Foksal was originally held in the 18th century by the aristocratic Czapski family, whose members erected a small suburban residence in its place. In 1746, Walenty Aleksander Czapski, Bishop of Przemyśl and Kuyavia, sold it to Maria Anna Brühl, who transformed it into a garden. Following her death, the land was acquired by a Warsaw banker of Huguenot origin, Fryderyk Cabrit (Kabryt). Together with Franciszek Ryx, a courtier and butler of King Stanislaus Augustus of Poland, they formed a joint venture with an aim of creating a space for public exhibitions and displays. Ryx and Kabryt subsequently established the Foksal Gardens, a place of entertainment for the wealthy residents and burghers of Warsaw, which opened on 15 May 1776. The name was not coincidental and corresponded to the fashionable Vauxhall Pleasure Gardens in London to attract attention. It became a site rented for balls and concerts, with eateries and illuminated pavilions for the guests. On 10 May 1789, French inventor Jean-Pierre Blanchard undertook Warsaw's first flight with an aerostatic balloon over the gardens and its surroundings. Much later, Jordaki Kuparenko repeated Blanchard's achievement on the same spot.

=== 19th century ===
The park continued to change hands and eventually disappeared over the course of the 19th century. Under the Przeździecki family, the property was partitioned, the former park alley was transformed into a street, and individual plots of land were sold. Between 1875 and 1877, Konstanty Zamoyski erected an imposing Renaissance Revival mansion at its far end. Designed by renowned Polish-Italian architect Leandro Marconi, the building survived to this day. Another extant historical edifice is the Przeździecki Palace with its two-storey arcaded colonnade, located at Foksal 6. It was rebuilt in its current Neo-Renaissance form between 1951 and 1953. Simultaneously, many city-style tenements and urban architecture began appearing close to the intersection with Nowy Świat. The Neo-Gothic house at Foksal 19 and Teatr Sabat at Foksal 16 are notable landmarks.

=== 20th & 21st centuries ===
Prior to 1939, the street was deemed prestigious and became inhabited by high society. Notably, Polish actor Eugeniusz Bodo opened a fashionable cafe and resided at Foksal 17. Many of the edifices also hosted social clubs and private associations. One of those clubs at Foksal 3 was often attended by politicians and military personnel. On 15 June 1934, Bronisław Pieracki, Minister of Internal Affairs of Poland, was assassinated by a Ukrainian nationalist and member of the OUN whilst exiting the premises, near the gate. Pieracki died in hospital on the same day. Shortly after, the name of the street was changed to honour the deceased statesman.

During the Second World War and the Warsaw Uprising in 1944, much of the street's built heritage was damaged or destroyed, though some important structures survived or were rebuilt. Nonetheless, the street maintained its historic appearance under the Polish People's Republic. Today, it is a venue for pubs, bars and restaurants, some of which are open-air. In terms of residential aspects, the flats and apartments at Foksal are one of the most expensive in Warsaw, particularly at Foksal 13 and 15. Both buildings underwent a major restoration between 2016 and 2020 by Ghelamco.

== See also ==
- Street names of Warsaw
- History of Warsaw
