= Wilhelm Ellis Rau Palace =

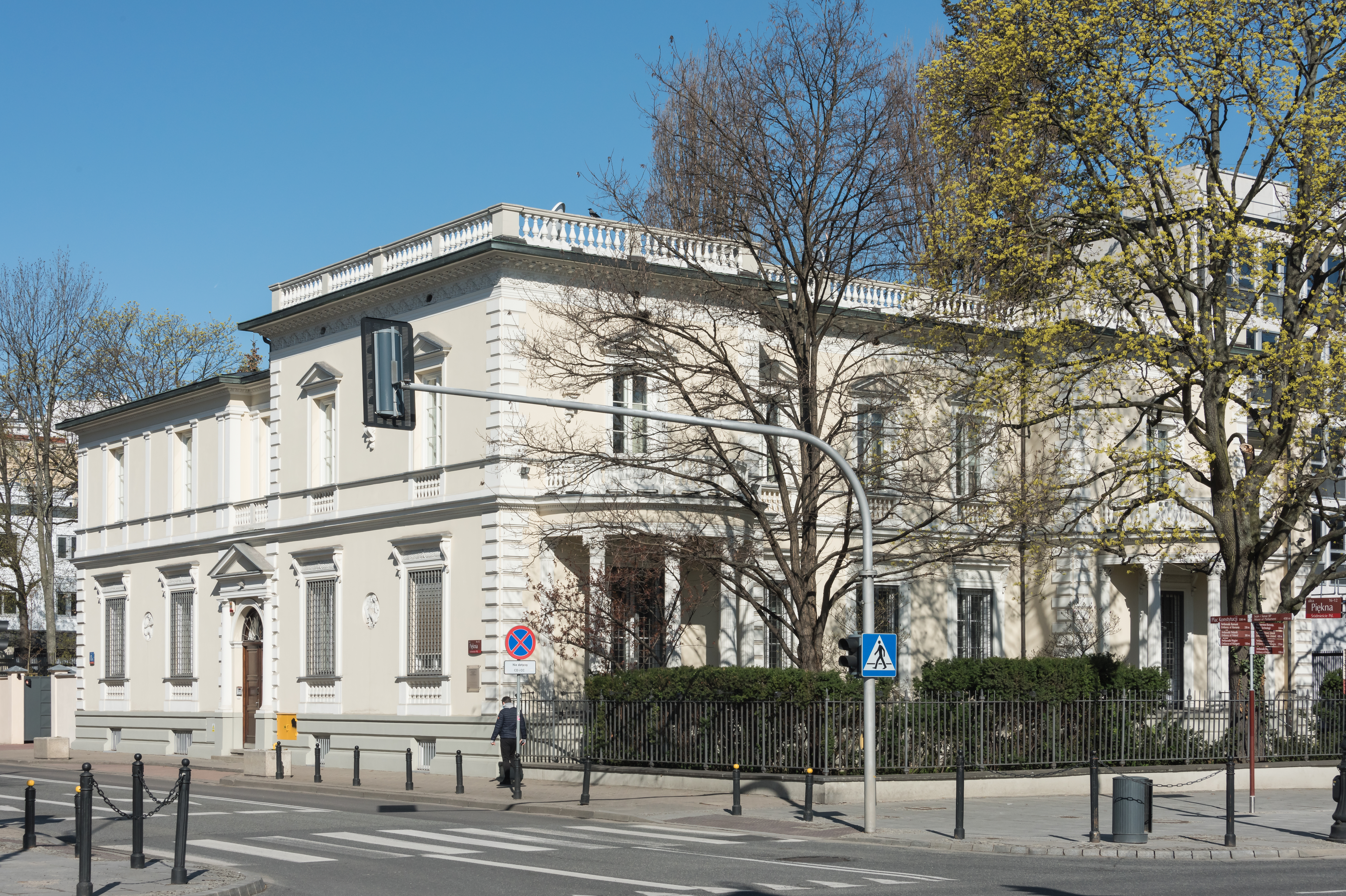
- Wilhelm Ellis Rau Palace

- Location of Wilhelm Ellis Rau Palace in Poland
- 52°13′26″N 21°01′24″E
- Location: Warsaw, Masovian Voivodeship; in Poland

History
- Built: 1868

Site notes
- Architect: Leandro Marconi
- Architectural style: Renaissance Revival

Wilhelm Ellis Rau Palace (Polish: Pałacyk Wilhelma Ellisa Raua) is a historical building, located on Ujazdów Avenue in Warsaw, Poland.

The palace was built between 1866 and 1868 under architect Leandro Marconi's designs. In the nineteen-twenties of the Polish interwar period the palace was rented by the Ministry of Foreign Affairs, serving the function of vice-minister Jan Szembek's residence. The villa burned down in 1944. After World War II, the building was rebuilt between 1948 and 1949, under Polish architect Szymon Syrkus and Swiss architect Hans Schmidt.

The palace, which is next to the US Embassy, houses the Embassy of Switzerland and the Swiss export promotional organisation Osec.

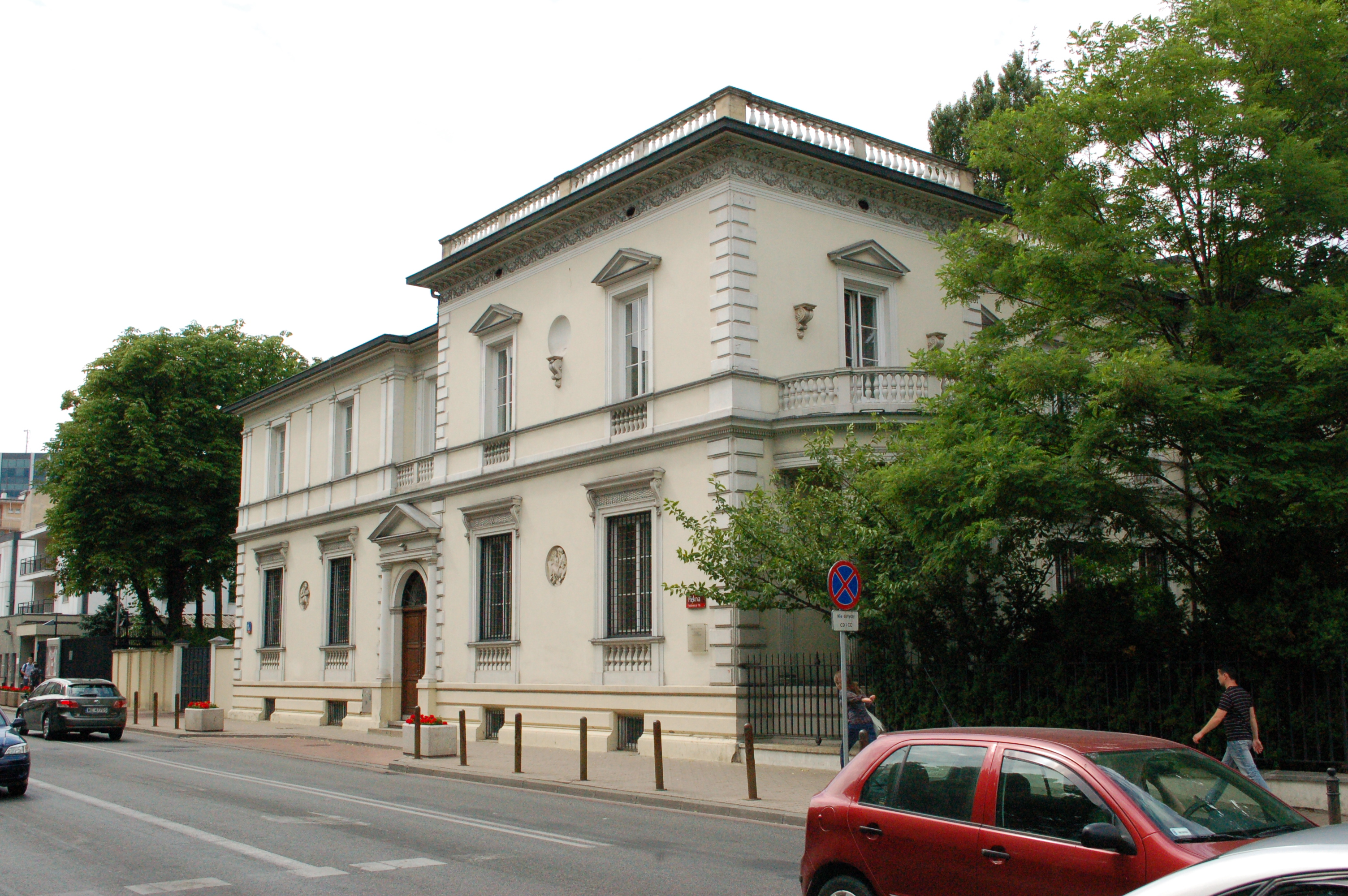
View of Rau Palace from Ujazdów Avenue

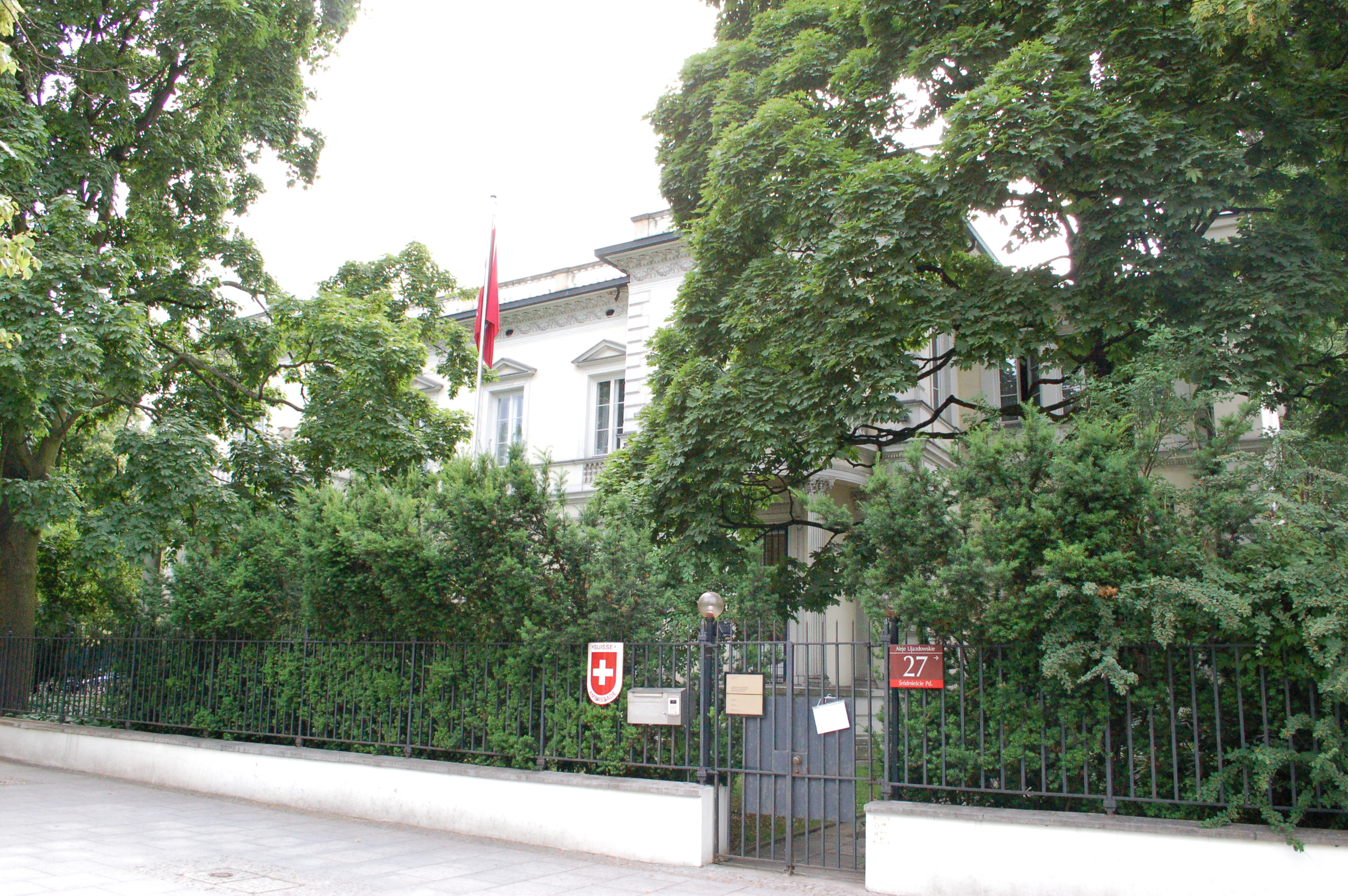
Garden view with Swiss flag

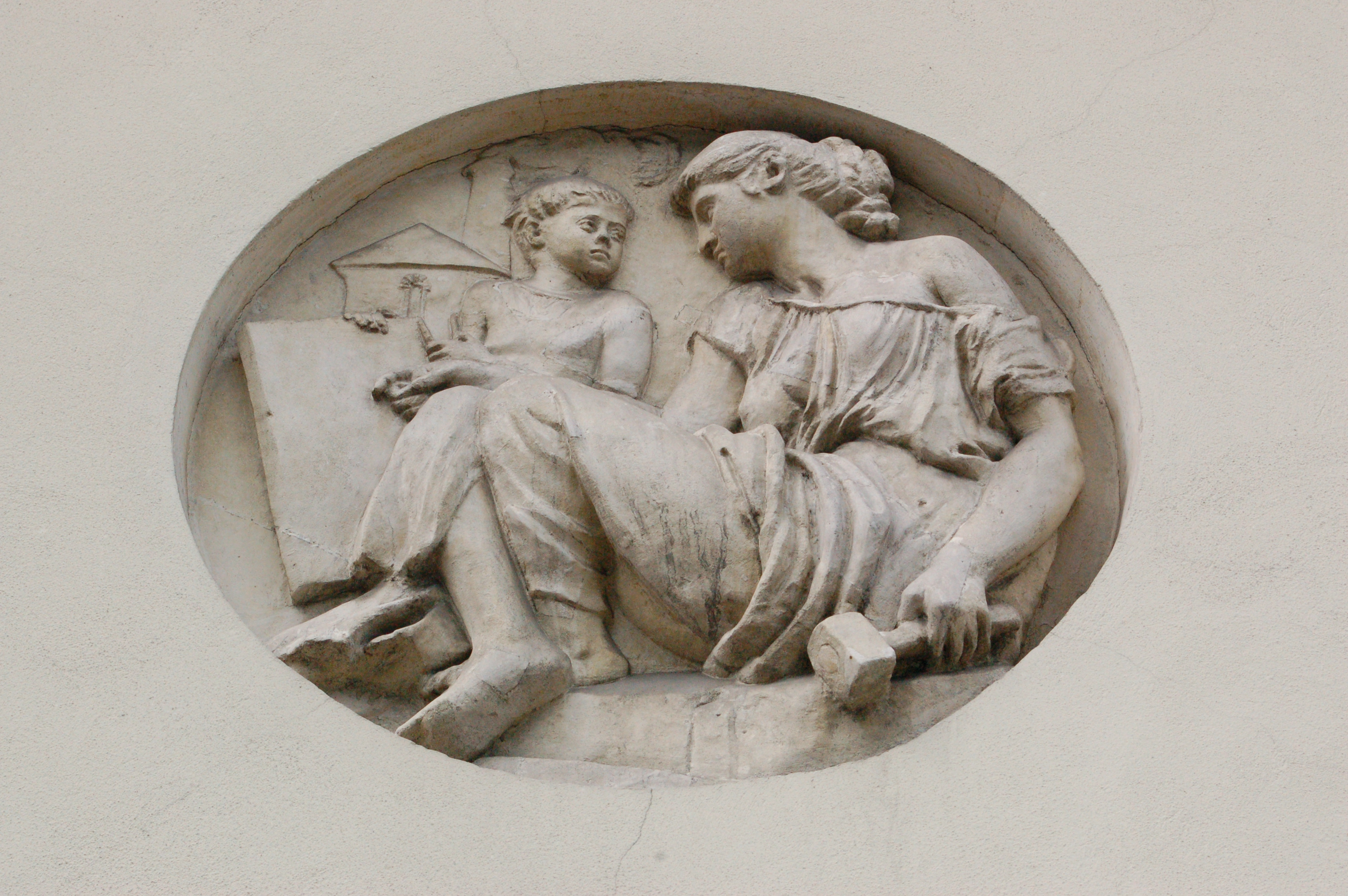
Detailed sculpture on the palace's walls
