= Assassination of Bronisław Pieracki =

1934 murder in Warsaw, Poland

- Part of OUN terror operations in Poland
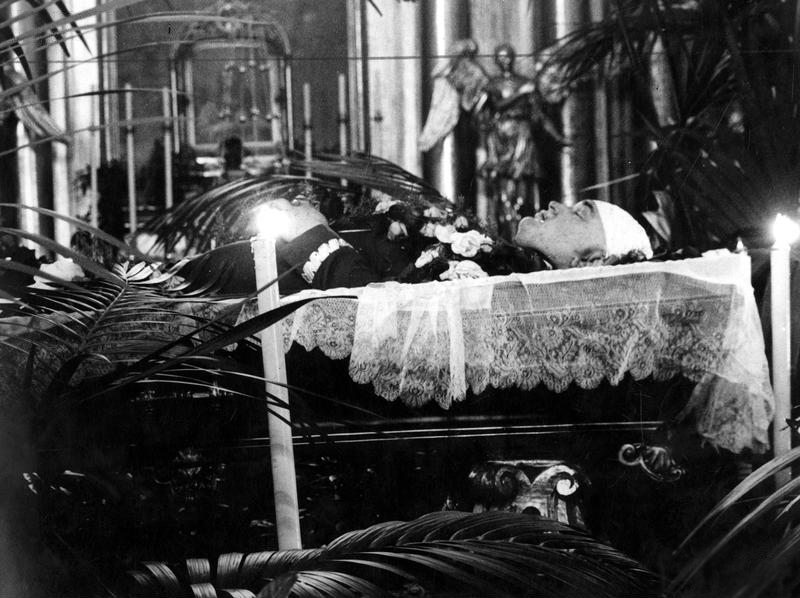
- The body of the assassinated minister on 18 June 1934
- Location: Foksal Street in Warsaw
- Date: 15 June 1934; 15:30
- Target: Bronisław Pieracki
- Attack type: Shooting
- Weapon: 7.65 mm caliber revolver
- Perpetrator: OUN led by Stepan Bandera
- Assailant: Hryhorii Matseiko
- Motive: Revenge for the pacification of Ukrainians in Eastern Galicia

On 15 June 1934, Bronisław Pieracki, the Polish minister of the interior, was assassinated by the Organization of Ukrainian Nationalists (OUN).

The chosen assassin, Hryhorii Matseiko (also known by his pseudonym "Gonta"), was a trusted member of the OUN.

== Background ==
The OUN was formed in 1929 by a number of Ukrainian pro-independence organizations dissatisfied with the annexation of Eastern Galicia by Poland in the aftermath of the Polish-Ukrainian War. It professed ethno-nationalism, including hostility to Poles, and in its first decade carried out several acts of terrorism, including political assassinations. As deputy minister of internal affairs, Pieracki was responsible for the campaign of "pacification", which was conducted by Polish authorities against the ethnic Ukrainian population suspected of being involved in OUN's sabotage campaign.

== Assassination ==
The assassination plan was decided at an OUN meeting in Berlin. In the months prior to the attack, a number of files related to the planned assassination were discovered by the police after it had captured parts of an OUN archive, and a report from Germany warned about the threat, but those were ignored by Polish authorities. On 14 June a wave of detentions was conducted in Lviv, during which Bandera and many other OUN leaders were apprehended. Mykola Lebed, the mastermind behind the plot, managed to evade arrest and supplied Matseiko, the executor of the operation, with a makeshift bomb and a 7.65mm caliber pistol from Bandera.

In the morning of 15 June 1934 Matseiko, aged 21, appeared at the Foksal Street in Warsaw in front of a social club frequented by Pieracki. He waited there for several hours undetected. The minister arrived in his limousine at 3:30 pm; however, Matseiko's bomb failed. He pulled the gun and shot the minister from behind twice in the back of his head. Matseiko escaped successfully with the help of OUN emissaries as far as Czechoslovakia and then on to Argentina.

Józef Piłsudski, Minister of Military Affairs and de-facto head of state of Poland, honoured Pieracki in his order to military units, comparing his death to one of a "true soldier". Pieracki's state funeral was attended by some 100,000 people. The coffin was sent to Nowy Sącz in a special train and laid in his family tomb.

== Aftermath ==
Despite the assassin dropping a blue and yellow ribbon, a symbol of the OUN, at the scene of the crime, the Polish authorities professed not to realize that OUN was behind the assassination and blamed the Polish National Radical Camp (ONR) for it. The mistake had terrible consequences for Poland's political life. As a result of this, the Bereza Kartuska prison for dissidents was established.

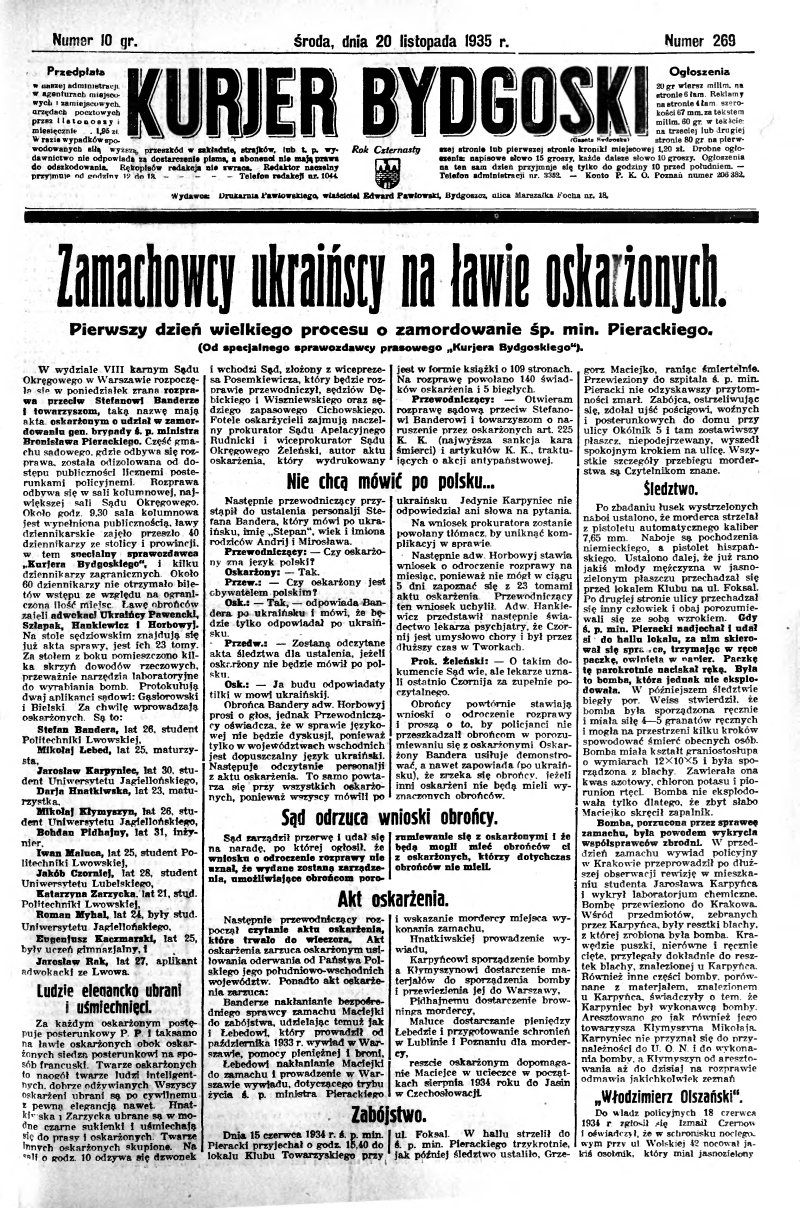
Front page of Kurjer Bydgoski from 20 November 1935, reporting on the beginning of the court case against Stepan Bandera and his co-conspirators

A year later, it became known that OUN was behind the assassination of Bronisław Pieracki. The trial of OUN leaders before a Warsaw circuit court took place between 18 November 1935 and 13 January 1936. Sixteen OUN members, including Stepan Bandera and Mykola Lebed, were found guilty of organizing the assassination.

After a two-month trial in Warsaw, the court sentenced the guilty as follows:

- Stepan Bandera, Mykola Lebed and Yaroslav Karpynets were sentenced to death (commuted to life imprisonment due to an amnesty);
- Mykola Klymyshyn, Bohdan Pidhainy sentenced to life imprisonment;
- Dariya Hnatkivska sentenced to 15 years imprisonment;
- Ivan Malyutsa, Roman Myhal and Yevhen Kachmarsky - 12 years imprisonment;
- Kateryna Zarytska - 8 years imprisonment;
- Yaroslav Rak and Yakiv Chorny - 7 years imprisonment.

The court also denied Hnatkivska, Malyutsa, Kachmarsky, Myhal, Chorny, Zarytska and Rak civil rights for 10 years.

The actual assassin, Hryhorii Matseiko, never faced a judge; he died in Buenos Aires in 1966.

== See also ==
- Assassination of Gabriel Narutowicz, first interwar president, 1922
