= Konstanty Zamoyski Palace =

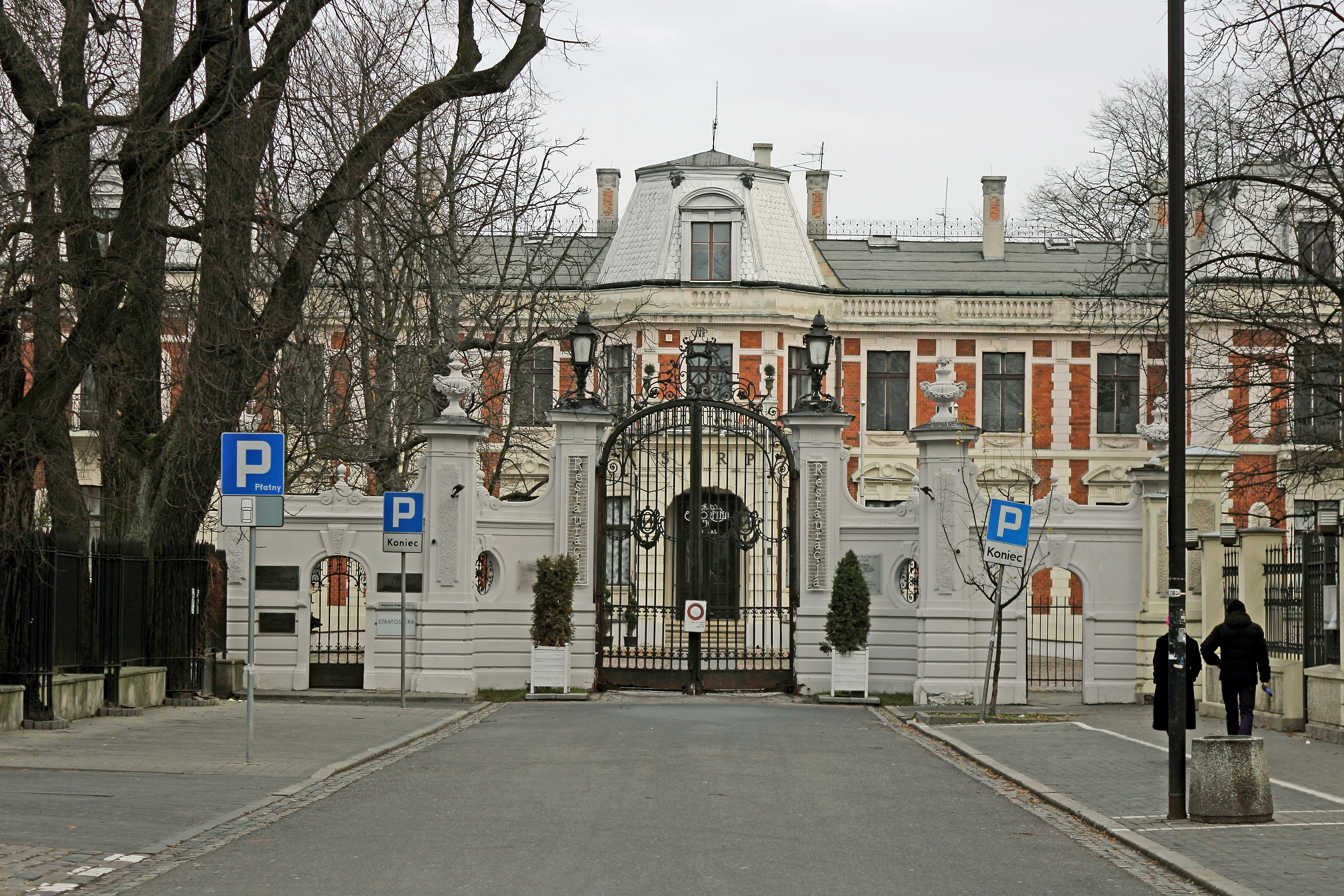
- Pałac Konstantego Zamoyskiego

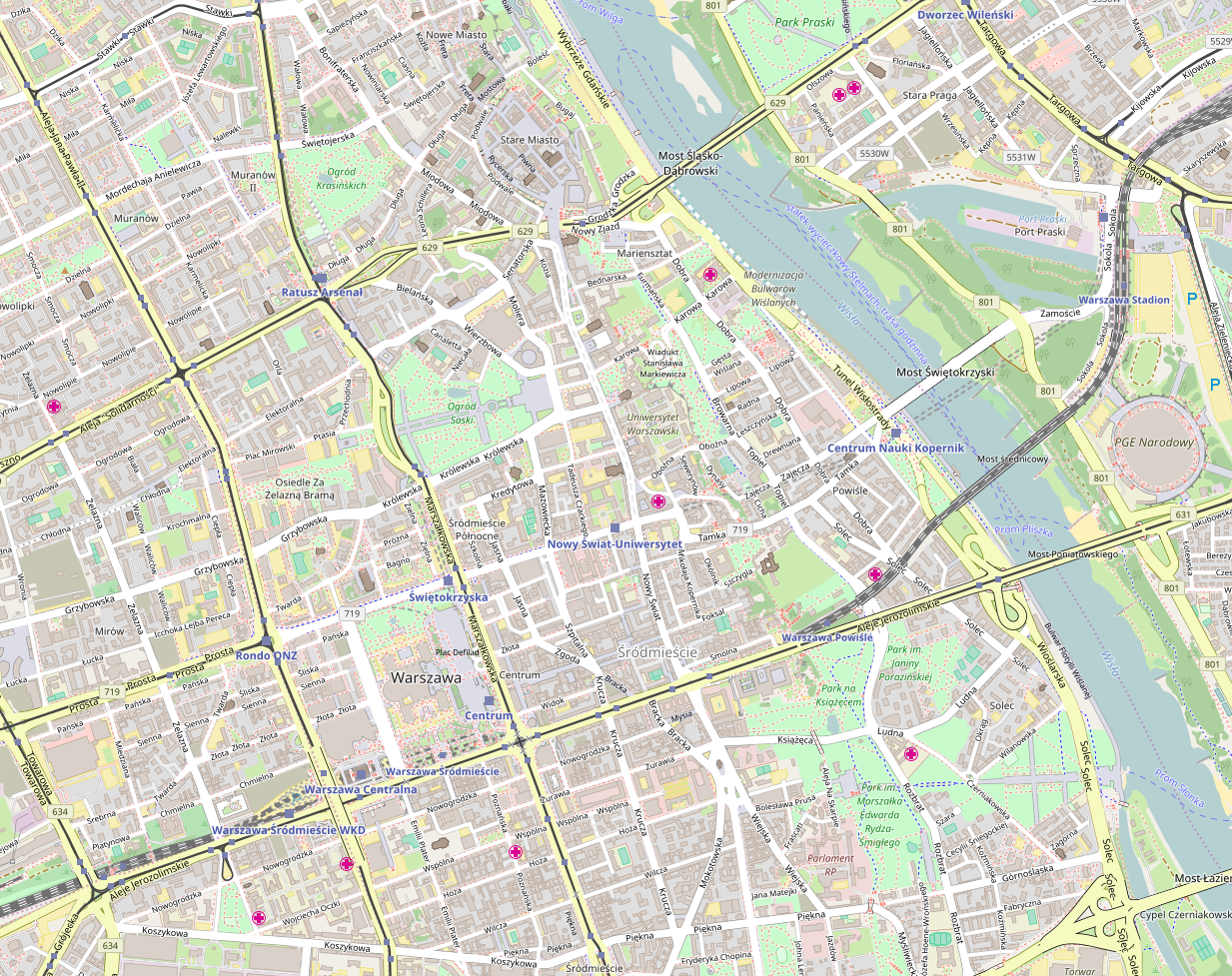
- Location of Konstanty Zamoyski Palace in Warsaw
- 52°14′04″N 21°01′26″E
- Location: Warsaw, Mazowsze Province, Poland

History
- Built: 1879

Site notes
- Architect: Leandro Marconi
- Architectural style: Renaissance Revival

The Konstanty Zamoyski Palace (Polish: Pałac Konstantego Zamoyskiego; Pałac Zamoyskich) is a historic building on Foksal Street in Warsaw, Poland.

== History ==
Prior to the construction of the Zamoyski Palace, the grounds had been dedicated for a Vauxhall Gardens-style parkland. In 1870 Konstanty Zamoyski became the grounds' owner.

The palace was built to architect Leonard Marconi's Renaissance Revival design. It comprises a main corpus and two perpendicular wings, to either side, flanking a courtyard. The driveway to Foksal Street is closed by a late-Baroque gate.

During World War II, the palace was slightly damaged. In 1949 the building complex was transferred to the Association of Polish Architects (Stowarzyszenie Architektów Polskich). The palace has also housed the Association of Polish Painters and Graphic Artists (Związek Polskich Artystów Malarzy i Grafików).

The palace now houses the Association of Polish Architects, the Association of House Builders, and the restaurant and club Endorfina Foksal.

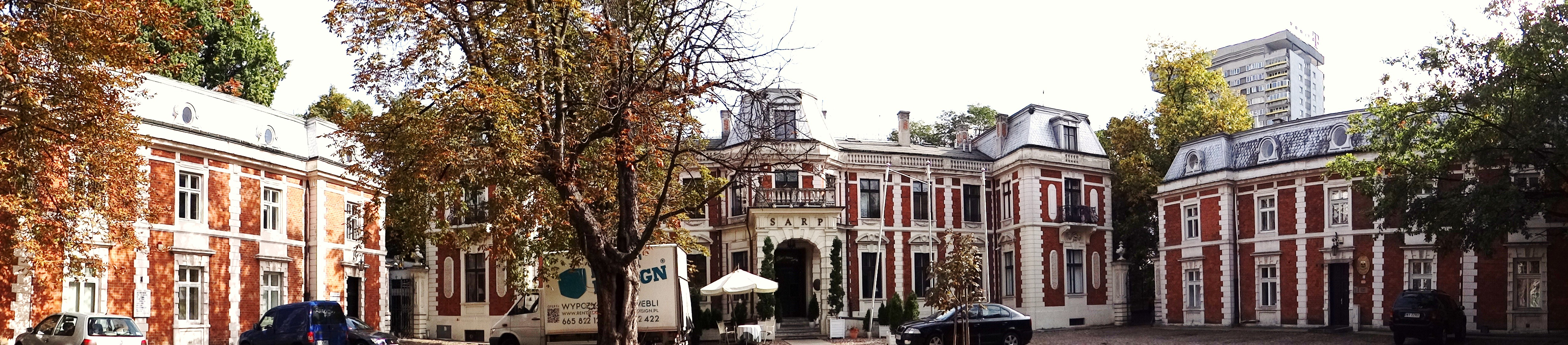
Panorama of Konstanty Zamoyski Palace
