= Leandro Marconi =

Polish architect (1834–1919)

Leandro Marconi (1834–1919) was a Polish architect, active mainly in Warsaw. His father was Enrico Marconi, also a famed architect associated with that city, while his cousin was Leonard Marconi, a sculptor.

He was born Leandro Jan Ludwik Marconi on 23 April 1834 in Warsaw, then in Kingdom of Poland. His father Enrico Marconi was a noted architect, who moved to Poland in 1822 and settled in Warsaw, while his mother was Małgorzata (English: Margaret) née Heiton, a lady of Scottish descent. He is an ancestor of Carlo Acutis.

== Biography ==
Marconi graduated from the local gymnasium in Warsaw and started career as an architect under the tutelage of his father. Initially both Marconis collaborated at the construction of the expensive Hotel Europejski (1856–1859). He also collaborated with his father and Jan Kacper Heurich at the construction of a parochial church in Wilanów (1857–1860). His first major project was a villa built for a mighty Rau family of entrepreneurs, financed by Wilhelm Ellis Rau. The building (finished in 1868) was considered successful and soon Marconi's career started for good. Until the end of the decade he authored, among others, the plan of refurbishment of his father's villa at Ujazdów Av. (dubbed "palace under the artichoke"), the monumental seat of Bank Handlowy (1873), house of Stanisław Zamoyski, and a villa for Sobański family (1877). The best-known of his designs - the Great Synagogue in Warsaw - was commissioned in 1877, after two successive architectural competitions were unsuccessful.

Around that time Marconi also built a renaissance revival palace for Konstanty Zamoyski at Foksal Street, a Branicki family residence in the Frascati Gardens and numerous palaces and churches outside of Warsaw. For many years he supervised the reconstruction of the Wilanów Palace, the summer residence of Polish kings. He is also said to be the author of Nożyk Synagogue, though his authorship is not certain. He died on 8 October 1919 in Montreux.

== Gallery ==
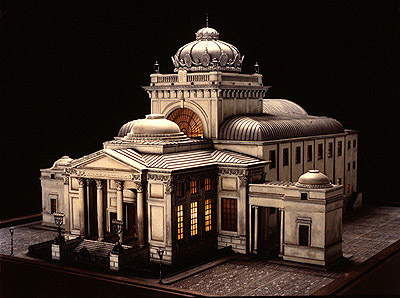
Model of the Great Synagogue in Warsaw

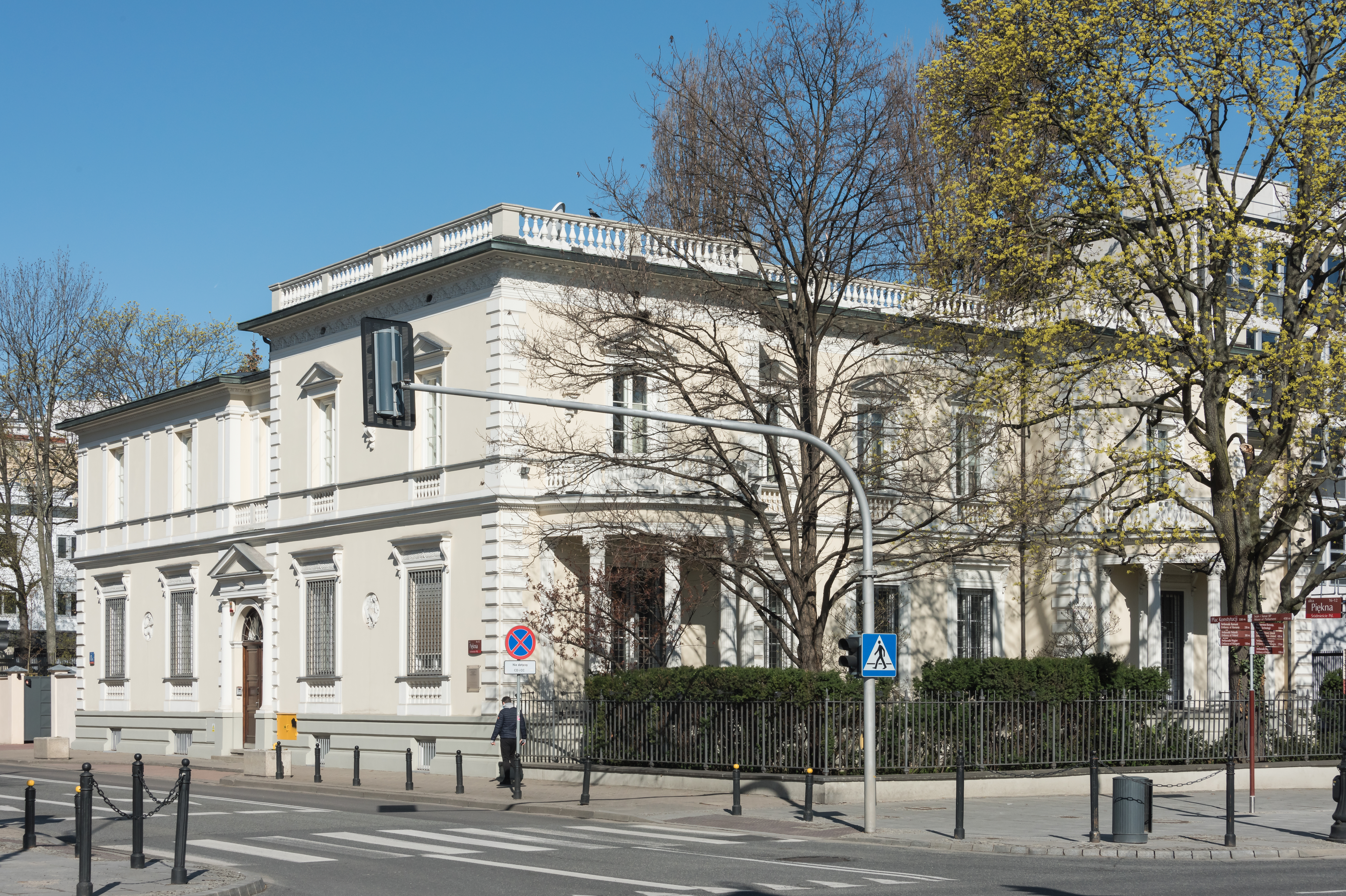
Rau Palace
(rebuilt 1948-1949)

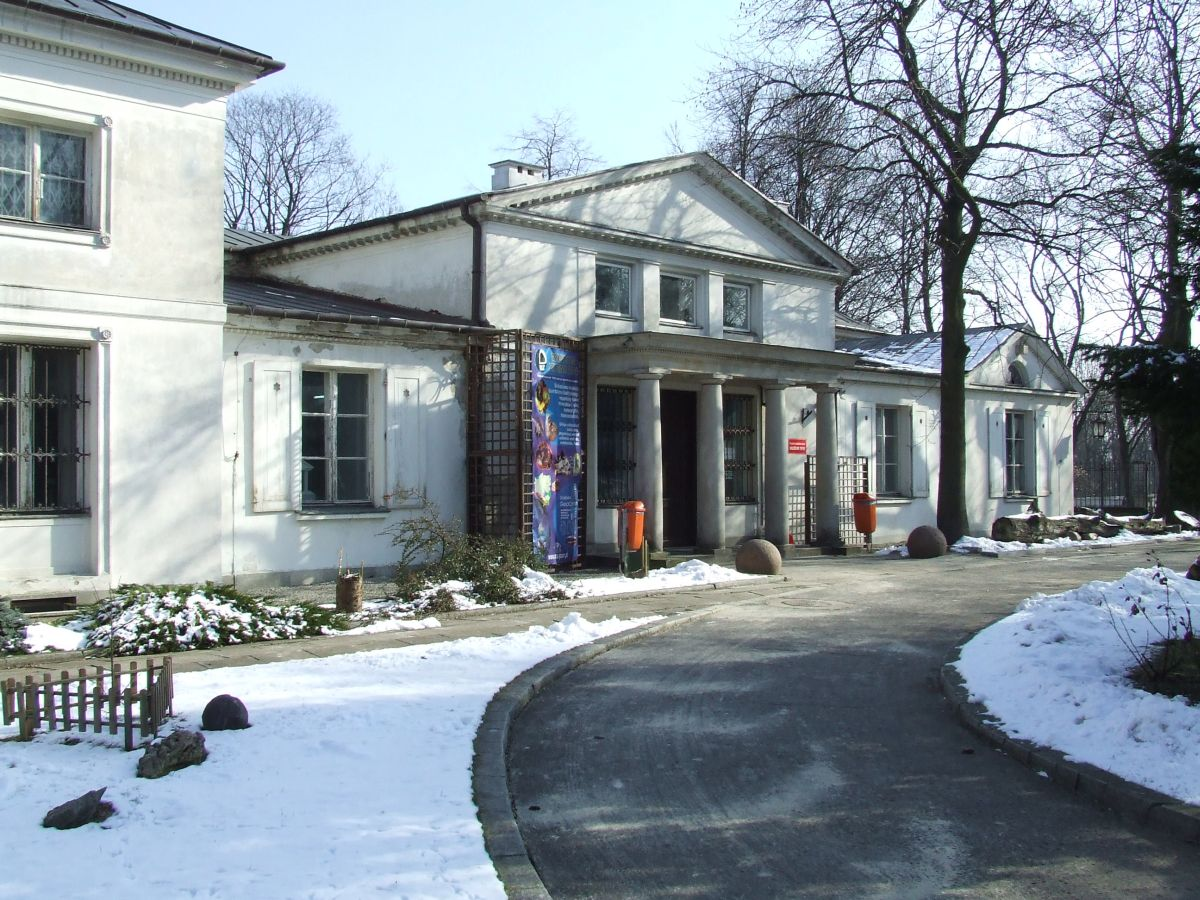
Little White Palace in Frascati Street

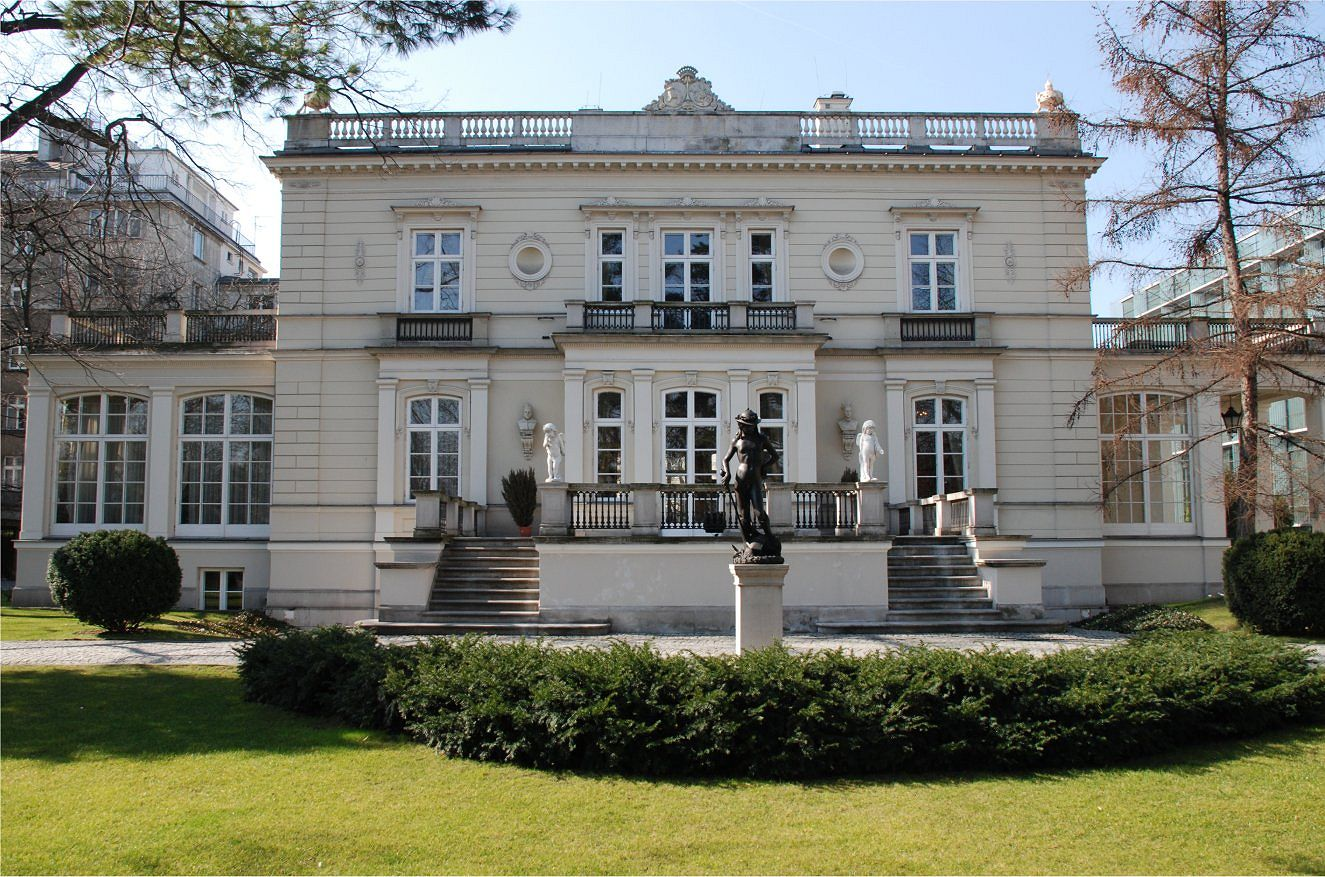
Sobańskis palace, Warsaw

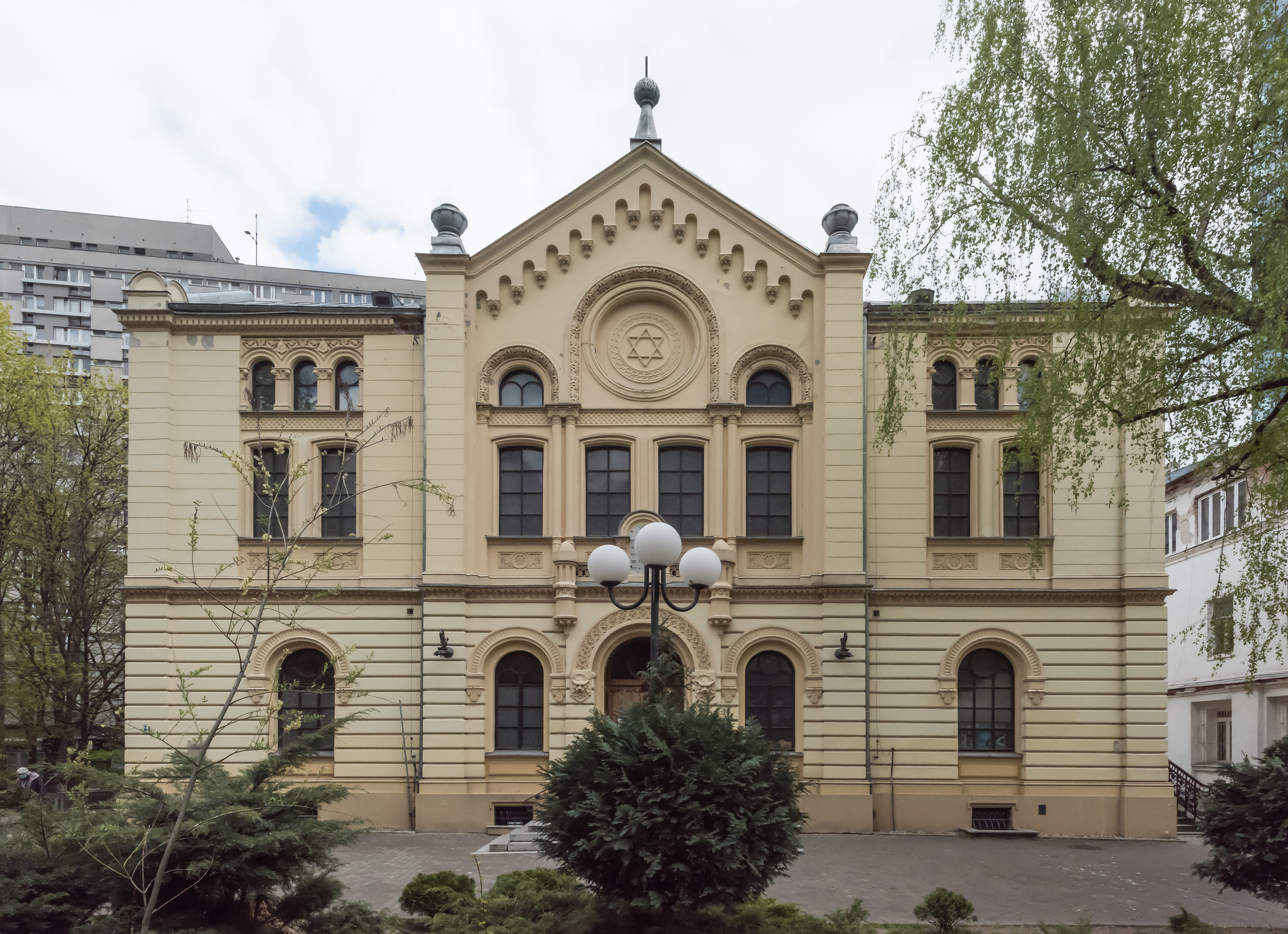
Nożyk Synagogue

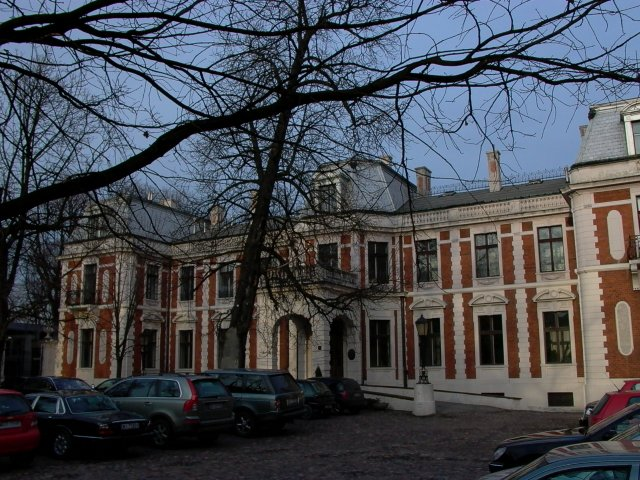
Konstanty Zamoyski palace, Warsaw

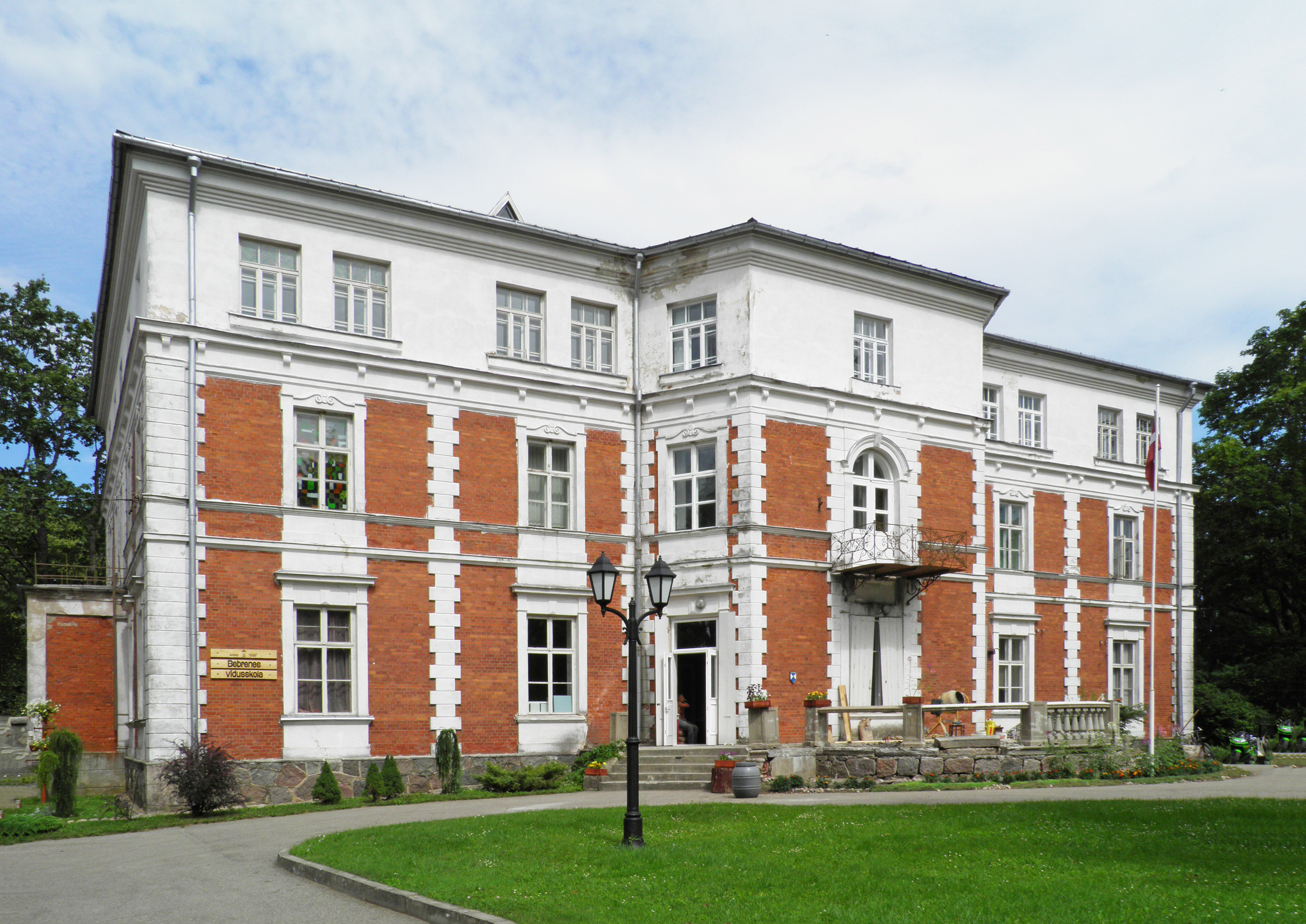
Bebrene Manor in Latvia
