= Jordaki Kuparenko =

Iordache Cuparencu (born 1780 in Călinești (Șerbăuți), Suceava; died 1844 in Warsaw) was a Polish-Romanian circus artist, aeronautics pioneer, engineer and theatre manager of Moldavian-Romanian descent.

== Life ==
=== Early life ===
Iordache Cuparencu (Cuparentco, in the Polish newspapers: Jordaki Kuparentko/Kupareńko, or as in his autographs - Kuparenko) was born in 1784 in the vicinity of Iasi into a wealthy family. According to Orgelbrand's Encyclopedia (1864), tired of being bullied by his brothers, he left his family in 1798, working as a decorator artist at the theatre in Iasi. Around 1800, he joined J. Kolter's French traveling circus that was performing in Moldavia at the time. During the tour he fell in love with the owner's daughter, whom he married in 1804. Cuparencu become a co-owner of the circus troupe, although the couple divorced in 1808. While touring in Poland, he fell from a height during a tightrope act and broke his leg severely. It turned out to be the end of his professional career as a stunt performer and tied him to Warsaw for the rest of his life, although he was an active entrepreneur of the circus later on.

=== Engineering and aeronautics career ===
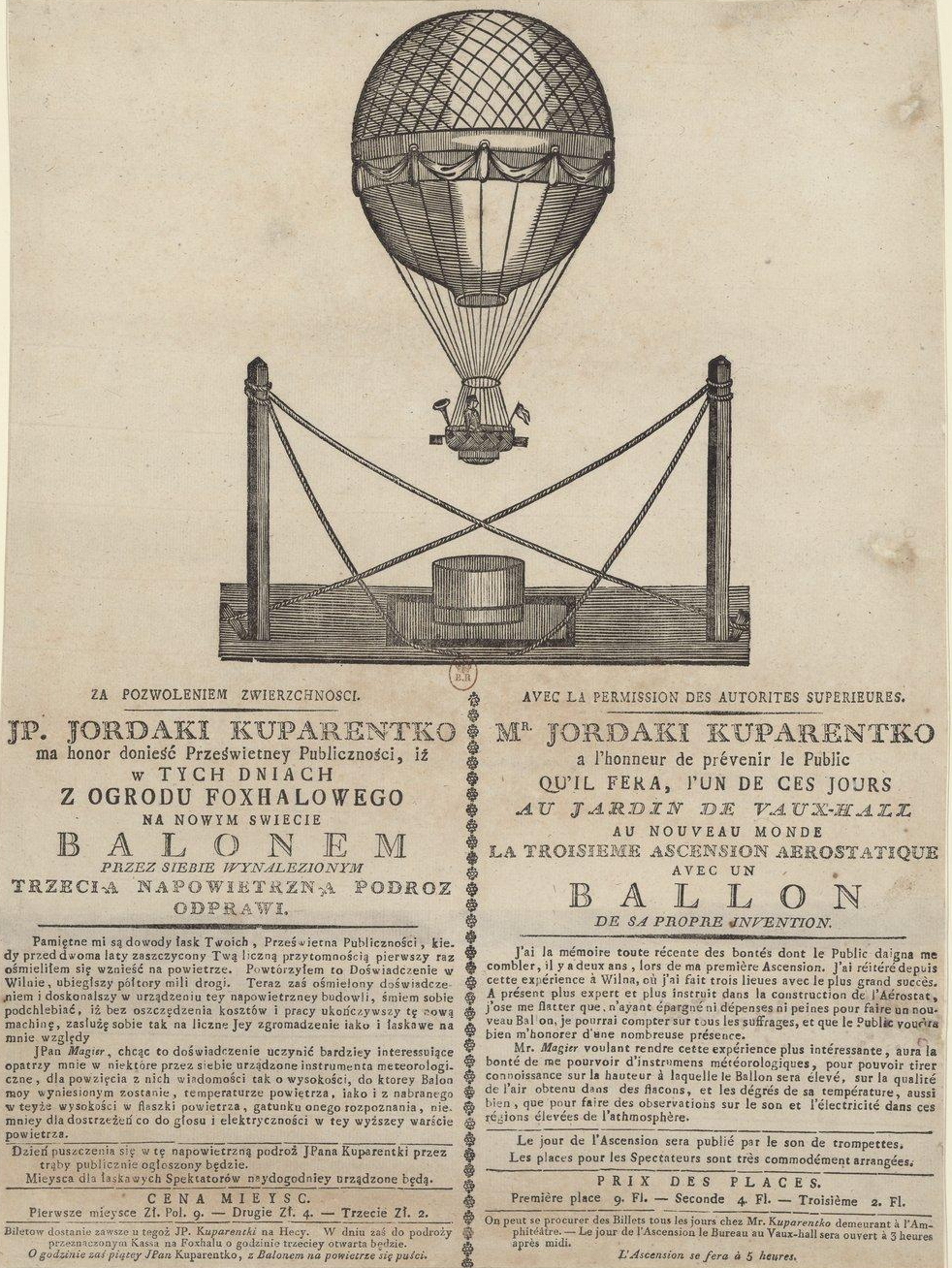
Poster of Kuparenko's third flight in Warsaw in Polish and French (1808)

Soon after a partial recovery from the accident, Cuparencu found his new venture, engineering, and experimented with constructing and piloting hot air balloons, taking inspiration from successes heard from abroad. The first two of his designs were made partly of paper; between 1806 and 1808 he flew publicly three times over Warsaw and Vilnius, rousing public interest. Despite some dangerous accidents, his flights were a commercial success, drawing large audiences and earning him recognition as an inventor. In fact, during his very first public balloon launch in June 1806, the balloon burst into flames at the height of a church tower; he saved himself by descending quickly and landing safely in Warsaw's Krakowskie Przedmieście. His second flight on 6 December 1806 in Vilnius, using the same type of construction, passed without incident despite strong winds, achieving a "high altitude" and a distance of 1.5 "miles" long (which could be up to 13 km, if interpreted as contemporary Polish miles). During his third flight on 24 July 1808, which started at 8 p.m., he used a new, fully fledged balloon construction, "having spared no expense or effort", as he claimed in the event's poster. Although ticketed, the flight was also of a scientific nature, and he carried out some meteorological measurements with equipment delivered from Warsaw. The experiment showed 3,882 French feet (1,320 meters) in height and a temperature of "several degrees" [Celsius], "so the observer [Mr. Cuparencu] felt cold", while the temperature of the air near the ground was reported as 23 degrees Celsius. According to the official poster, a sample of air was planned to be taken. The flight was successful but also featured an emergency landing, as a sudden, strong wind started to tear the balloon apart only minutes after the favorable conditions that had enabled data to be collected. The balloon then began to fall and eventually ignited near the ground. Nevertheless, Cuparencu did not leave the basket and landed safely near Warsaw's Powązki Cemetery, after a flight of less than 15 minutes, with the bottom of the basket serving as a parachute. He was assisted by two French bystanders and transported in good health back to the city, much to the excitement and relief of his audience. Cuparencu and these incidents are now listed in the Guinness World Records as the first survivor of an air crash and the first successful use of a parachute in action.

=== Puppet theatre and other activities ===
One of Cuparencu's other great interests was the art of puppeteering. From 1816 he was known as a theatre owner and manager, establishing his headquarters four times in different places in Warsaw, one of them in the chambers of the National Theatre. The first of his creations was a shadow theatre, the first permanent theatre of this kind in Warsaw. He constructed and managed a mechanized puppet theatre named Pitoresque, which officially premiered in 1830 (upgraded in 1842), and was well received in the city; it was even exhibited in Paris. It also featured optical-mechanical illusions, where the visitor could witness dioramas and panoramic "pictures of diverse places". According to a 19th-century encyclopedia, "sunsets, sun in the midday, sundowns and nights were witnessed", accompanied by realistic sound effects, such as thunder and rain.

Cuparencu was also a Polish army soldier since 1811, reaching the rank of a lieutenant (of the artillery); he spent the rest of his life in Poland. Among his other inventions were:

- A barrel organ, consisting of 27 brass trumpets that played arranged music, including fragments from the opera Der Freischütz by Karl Maria von Weber.
- During one of his ticketed exhibitions he demonstrated his repeating gun, which he described as "a gun that, after one loading, shoots 10 times". It is sometimes seen as a prototype of the machine gun.

In 1808 he married for the second time with Anna Henrtietta Teiflin, the daughter of the owner of the Heca amphitheatre; he subsequently took over management of the theatre, and eventually bought it in 1821. His biography is listed in the first edition of Polish encyclopedia by Samuel Orgelbrand. Iordache Cuparencu is buried at the Orthodox Cemetery in Warsaw.
