= Bohdan Lachert =

Polish architect (1900–1987)

Bohdan Lachert (13 June 1900 – 8 January 1987) was a Polish architect, a member of the Praesens group.

He collaborated with fellow Polish architect Józef Szanajca to design numerous buildings, including modern villas in Saska Kępa – drawing inspiration from Le Corbusier's ideas, and the Polish pavilion at Paris EXPO in 1937. Following World War II, he designed a part of Muranów (on the ruins of the Warsaw Ghetto), as well as the Mausoleum of the Soviet Soldiers in Warsaw. He was the author of the Józef Szanajca monument.

Winner of the SARP Honorary Award in 1984.
