= Józef Szanajca =

Polish architect (1902–1939)

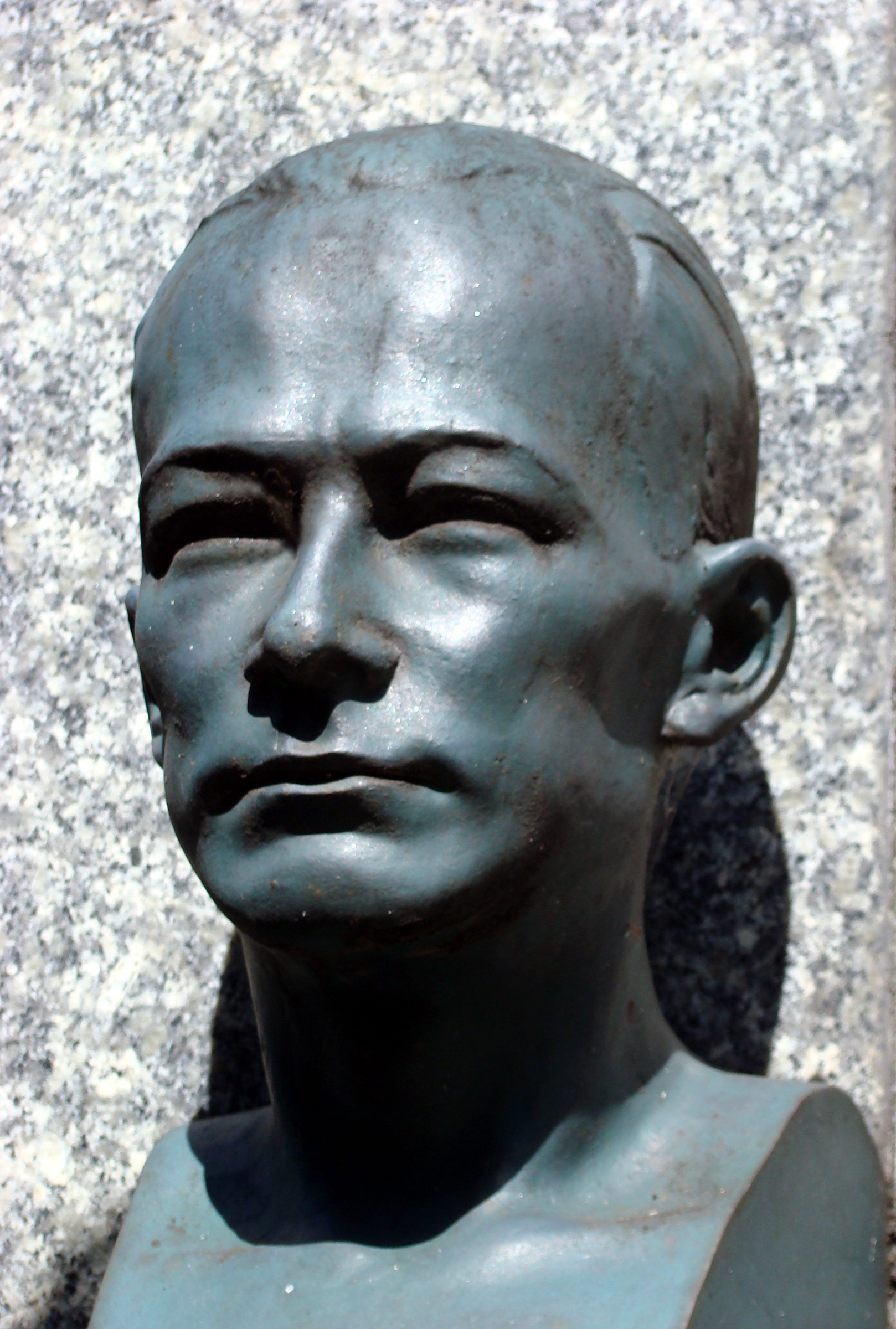

Józef Szanajca (Polish: [ˈju.zɛf ʂaˈnaj.t͡sa]; 17 March 1902 – 24 September 1939) was a Polish architect.

Founder and member of PRAESENS group: "The Praesens group played a pioneering role in the development of modern architecture in Poland. From 1927 a link with Le Corbusier was established. Its members participated in all the main meetings".

Józef Szanajca is one of the most eminent representatives of the Polish modern architecture, the holder of Malevich's and Bauhaus' ideas. Friend and partner to Bohdan Lachert. They won together the Grand Prix of Exposition Internationale des Arts et Techniques dans la Vie Moderne (1937) for the Polish pavilion.

Mobilized to Polish army, he died in combat in September 1939 during German invasion of Poland.
