= Blok (avant-garde group) =

Polish avant-garde artist collective

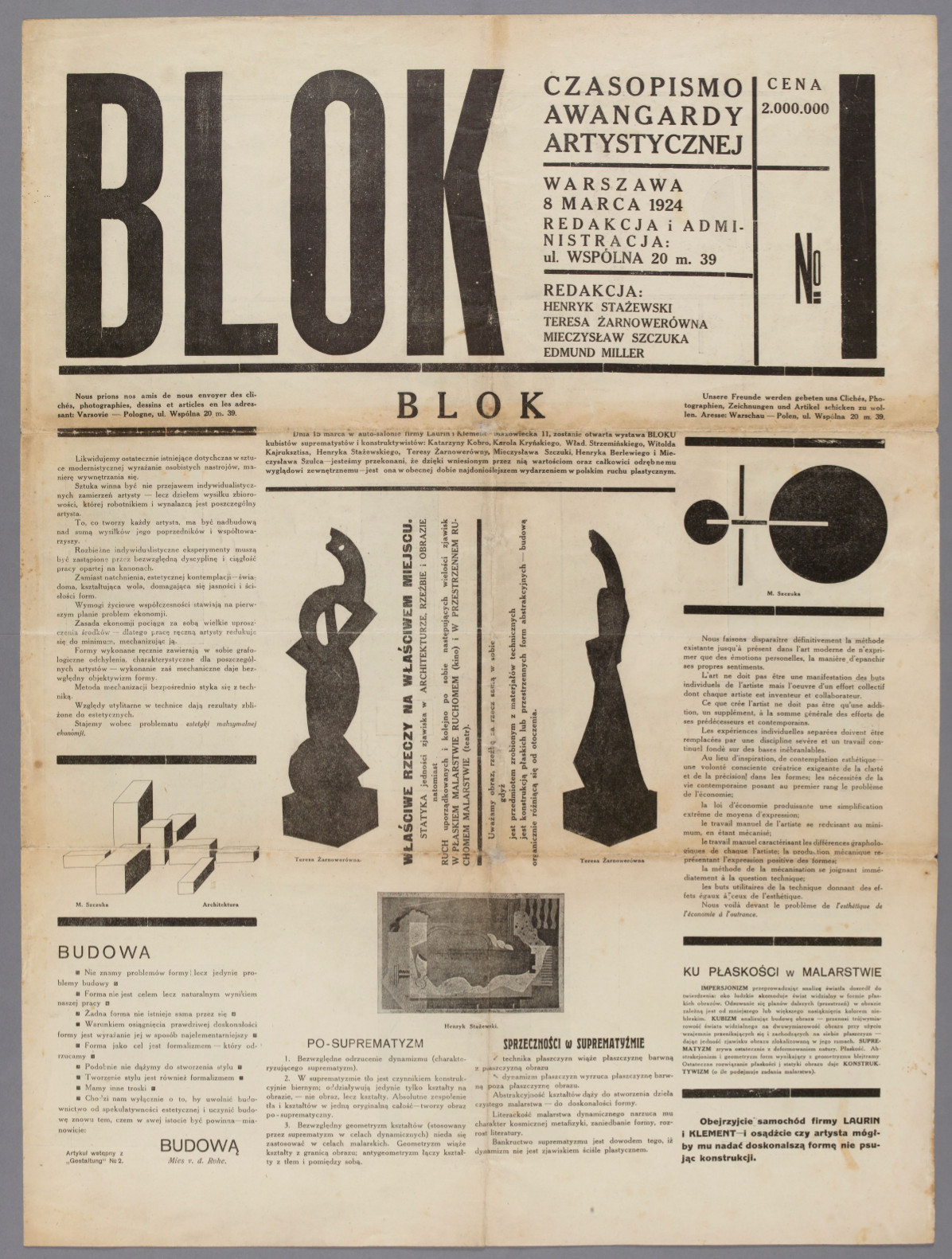
- Cover of Blok (Issue 1, 1924) which was designed by Henryk Stażewski
- Years active: 1924-1926
- Location: Warsaw, Second Polish Republic
- Major figures: Henryk Berlewi; Katarzyna Kobro; Henryk Stażewski; Władysław Strzemiński; Mieczysław Szczuka
- Influences: Constructivism
- Influenced: Praesens and a.r. group

Blok of Cubists, Suprematists, and Constructivists a.k.a. Blok (Polish: Blok Kubistów, Suprematystów i Konstruktywistów) was a Polish avant-garde artist collective active in the years 1924–1926 and founded by Władysław Strzemiński, Katarzyna Kobro, Henryk Berlewi, Henryk Stażewski and Mieczysław Szczuka, amongst others. Blok was a precursor to Praesens (1926–1930) and a.r. group (1929–1936), and all three collectives played a critical role in the development of Polish Constructivism.

== History ==
The Blok group was established following the New Art Exhibition in Vilnius, which was organized in 1923, and inspired by Russian Constructivism, specifically the activities of artists associated with the Vkhutemas and INKhUK institutes in post-revolutionary Moscow.

Similarly to their Russian counterparts, Polish Constructivist artists deployed art as a tool in aiding the formation of new, modern society through functional architecture, poster design, graphic design, typography, and furniture architecture. Blok's members included e.g. Mieczysław Szczuka, Jan Golus, Katarzyna Kobro-Strzemińska, Władysław Strzemiński, Teresa Żarnowerówna, Henryk Berlewi, Henryk Stażewski, Maria Nicz-Borowiakowa, Aleksander Rafałowski, Maria Puciatycka, Witold Kajruksztis, Karol Kryński, Teresa Roszkowska and Mieczysław Szulc.

The artists published the magazine Blok, which included theoretical texts on art and society, reproductions of works by the participating artists, as well as works by foreign artists such as Kazimir Malevich, Filippo Tommaso Marinetti, Theo van Doesburg, Kurt Schwitters and Herwarth Walden. The group dissolved in 1926 as a result of ideological disputes regarding the role and nature of art in modern society. Władysław Strzemiński, Katarzyna Kobro and Henryk Stażewski left Blok to work with a group of architects under the name Praesens.
