= Praesens =

Artist and architect collective in Warsaw

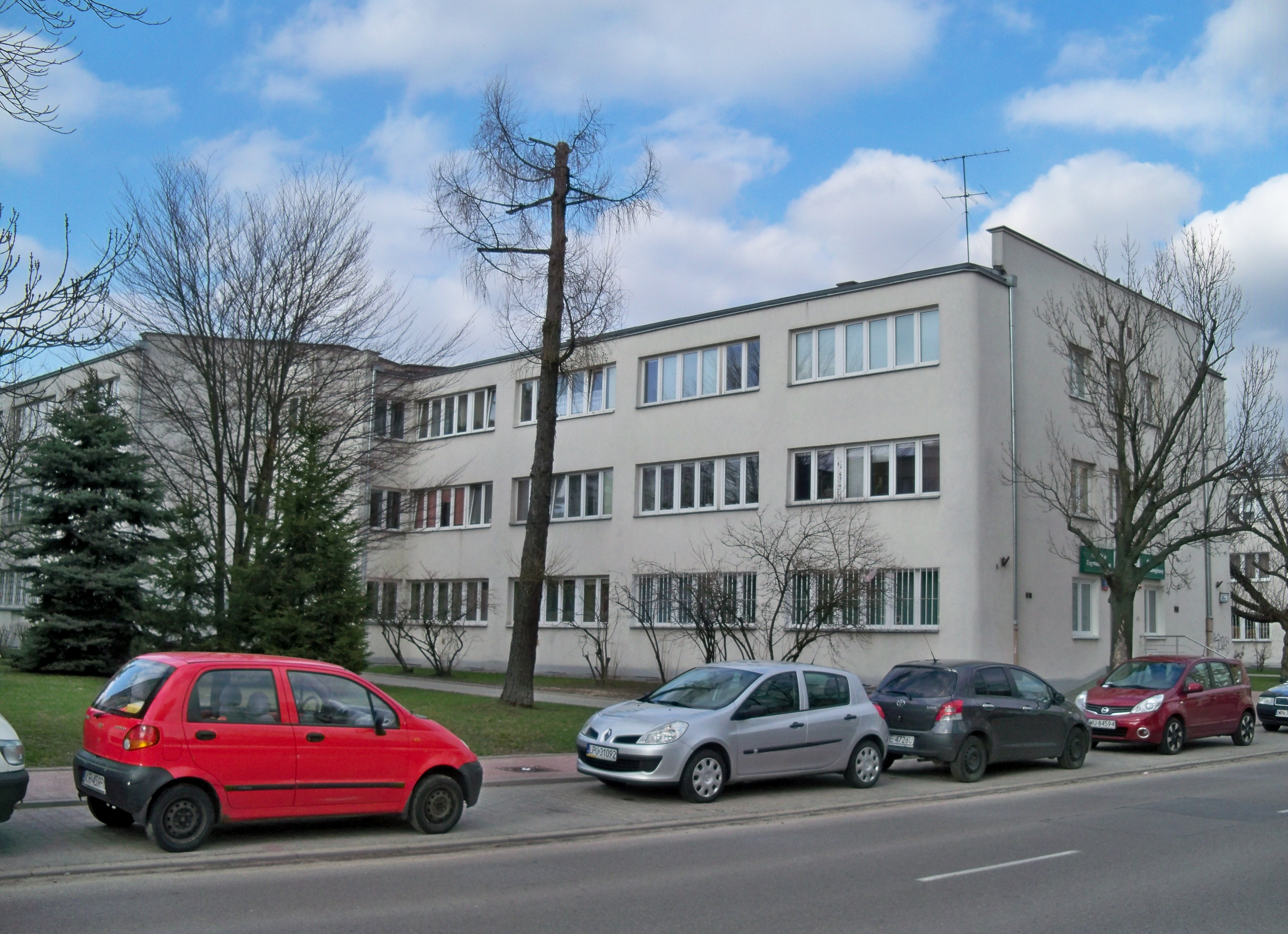
- One of the buildings comprising the WSM Rakowiec housing cooperative in Ochota, designed by members of the collective
- Years active: 1926–1930
- Location: Warsaw, Second Polish Republic
- Major figures: Helena Syrkus
- Influences: Blok
- Influenced: a.r. group

Praesens (from Latin: "present tense") was a Polish avant-garde artist and architect collective active in the years 1926–1930, which was formed following the dissolution of Blok.

== History ==
The founders of the Praesens group included graduates of the Faculty of Architecture of the Warsaw University of Technology as well as numerous avant-garde visual artists previously associated with Blok. In 1928, Praesens became the Polish branch of the Congrés Internationaux d`Architecture Moderne (CIAM).

In architecture, Praesens members had sought to create affordable housing through functional architecture. The ideas espoused by Praesens members shared many similarities with those of the artists associated with Weimar Bauhaus, the Dutch De Stijl and the Moscow Vkhutemas. Among other projects, architects associated with Praesens contributed to the design of the Warsaw Housing Cooperative in the Rakowiec district which was completed in 1936.

Its members included architects Barbara Brukalska and Stanisław Brukalski, Bohdan Lachert, Szymon and Helena Syrkus, Józef Szanajca, and Józef Malinowski, and artists Władysław Strzemiński, Katarzyna Kobro, Henryk Stażewski, Aleksander Rafałowski, Maria Łucja Nicz-Borowiakowa, Jan Golus, Karol Kryński, Romuald Kamil Witkowski, and Kazimierz Podsadecki. Three of its members, Władysław Strzemiński, Katarzyna Kobro, and Henryk Stażewski, went on to establish the a.r. group in 1929.
