= Warsaw Reconstruction Office =

Polish institution established to rebuild Warsaw after World War II

- Biuro Odbudowy Stolicy
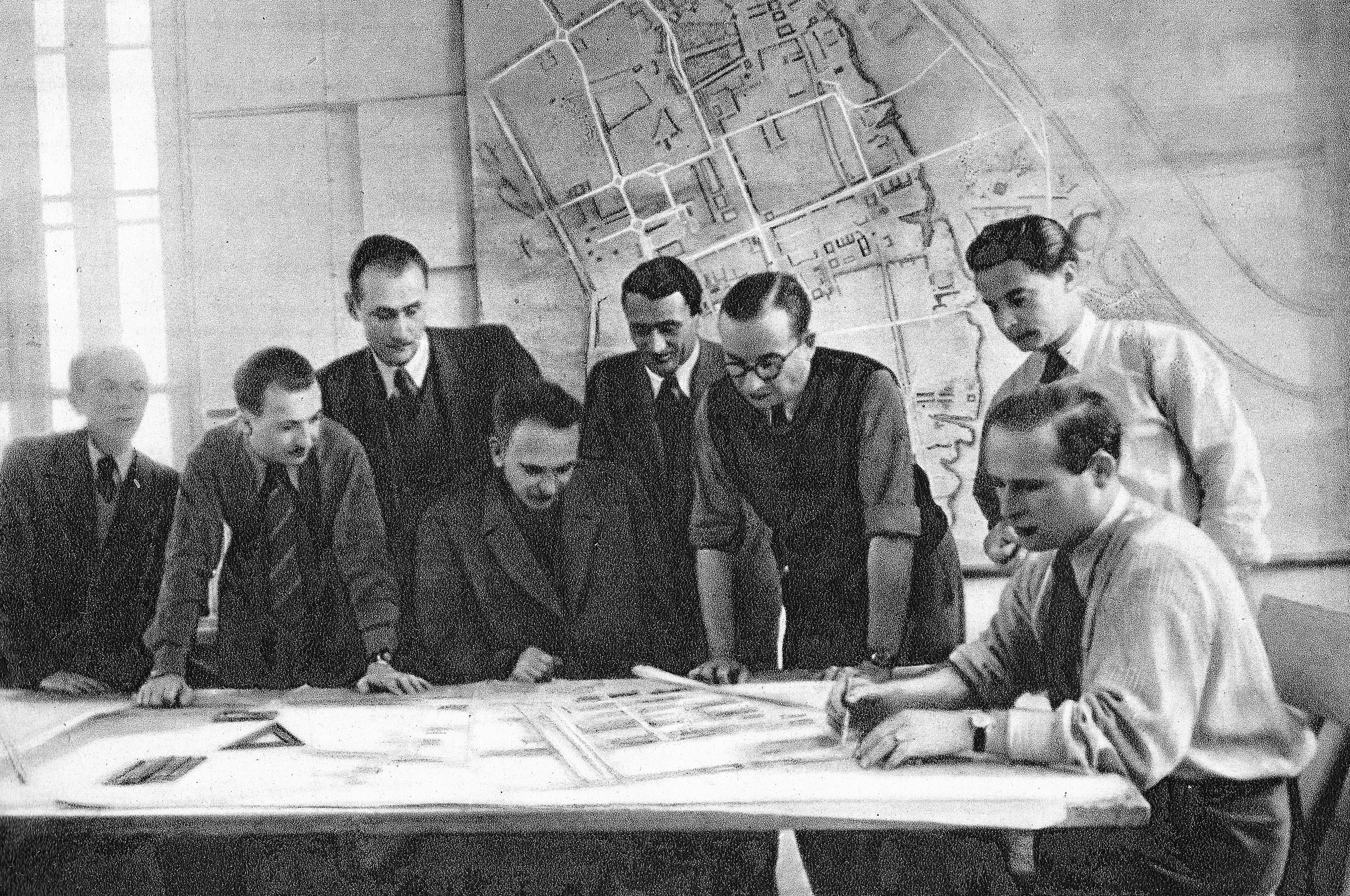
- Employees of the Warsaw Reconstruction Office in the Śródmieście urban planning studio

Agency overview
- Formed: 14 February 1945
- Dissolved: 1951
- Headquarters: 33 Chocimska Street, Warsaw

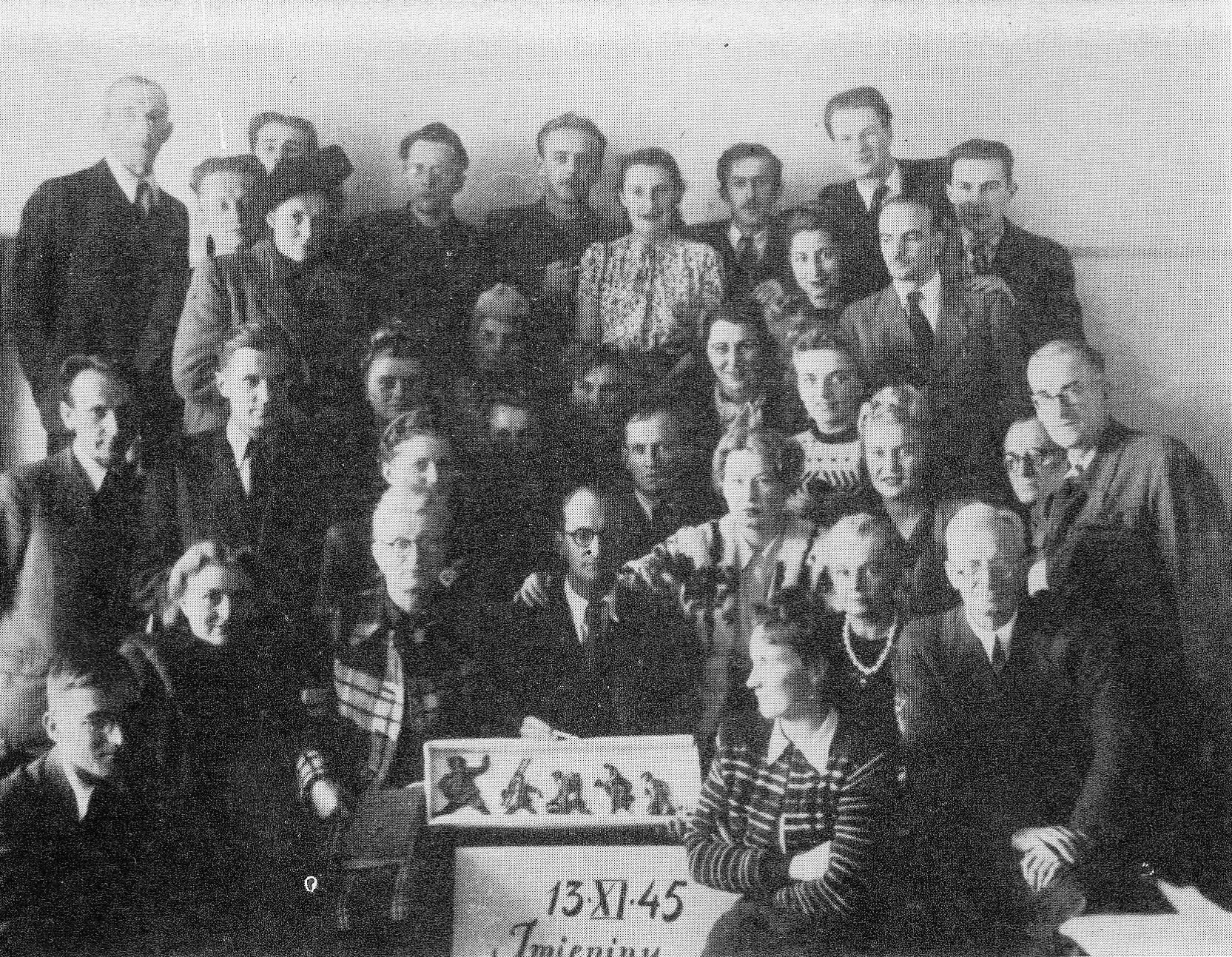
Employees of the Historic Architecture Department of Warsaw Reconstruction Office in 1945

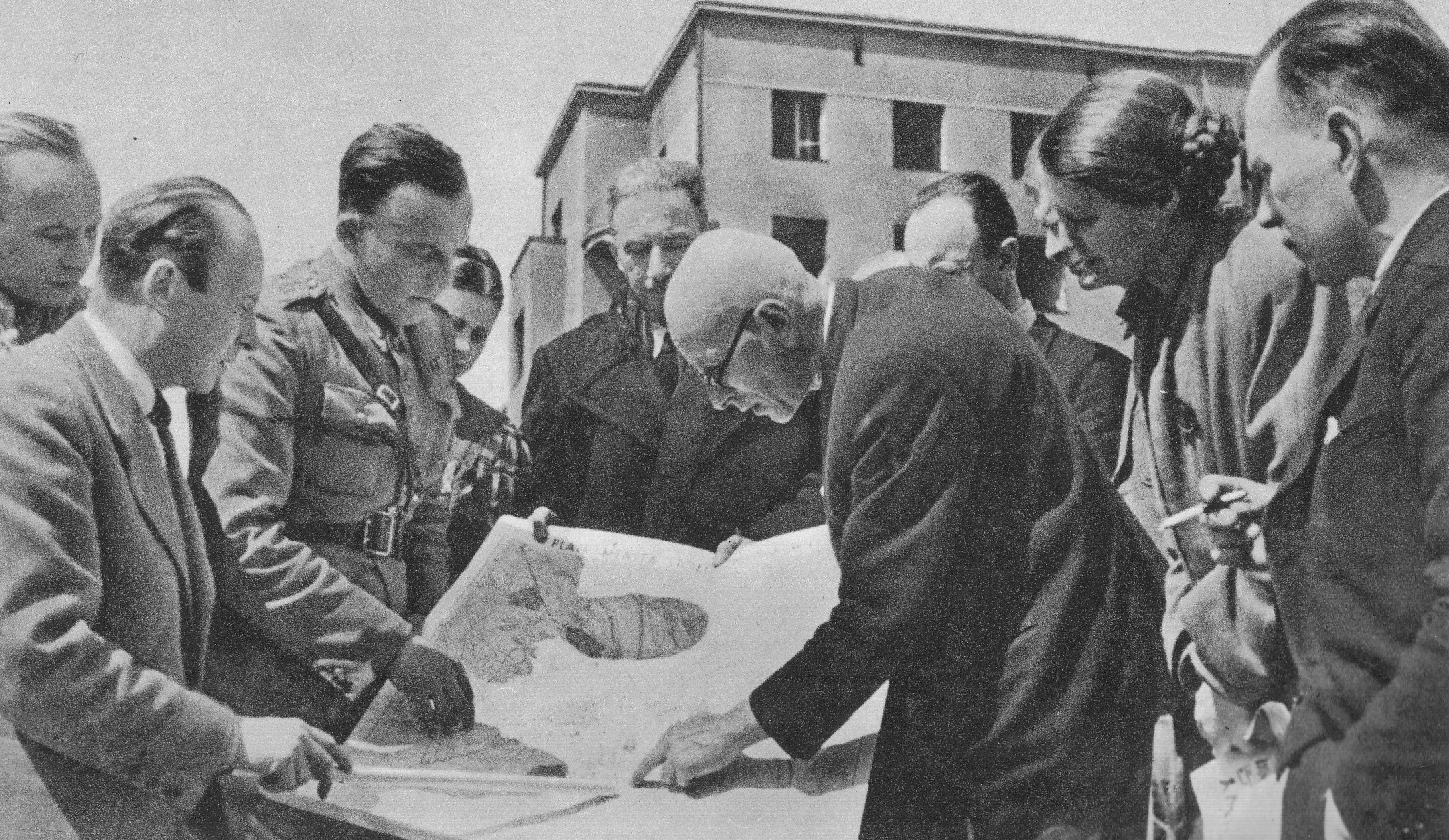
Roman Piotrowski (center) with Warsaw Reconstruction Office employees

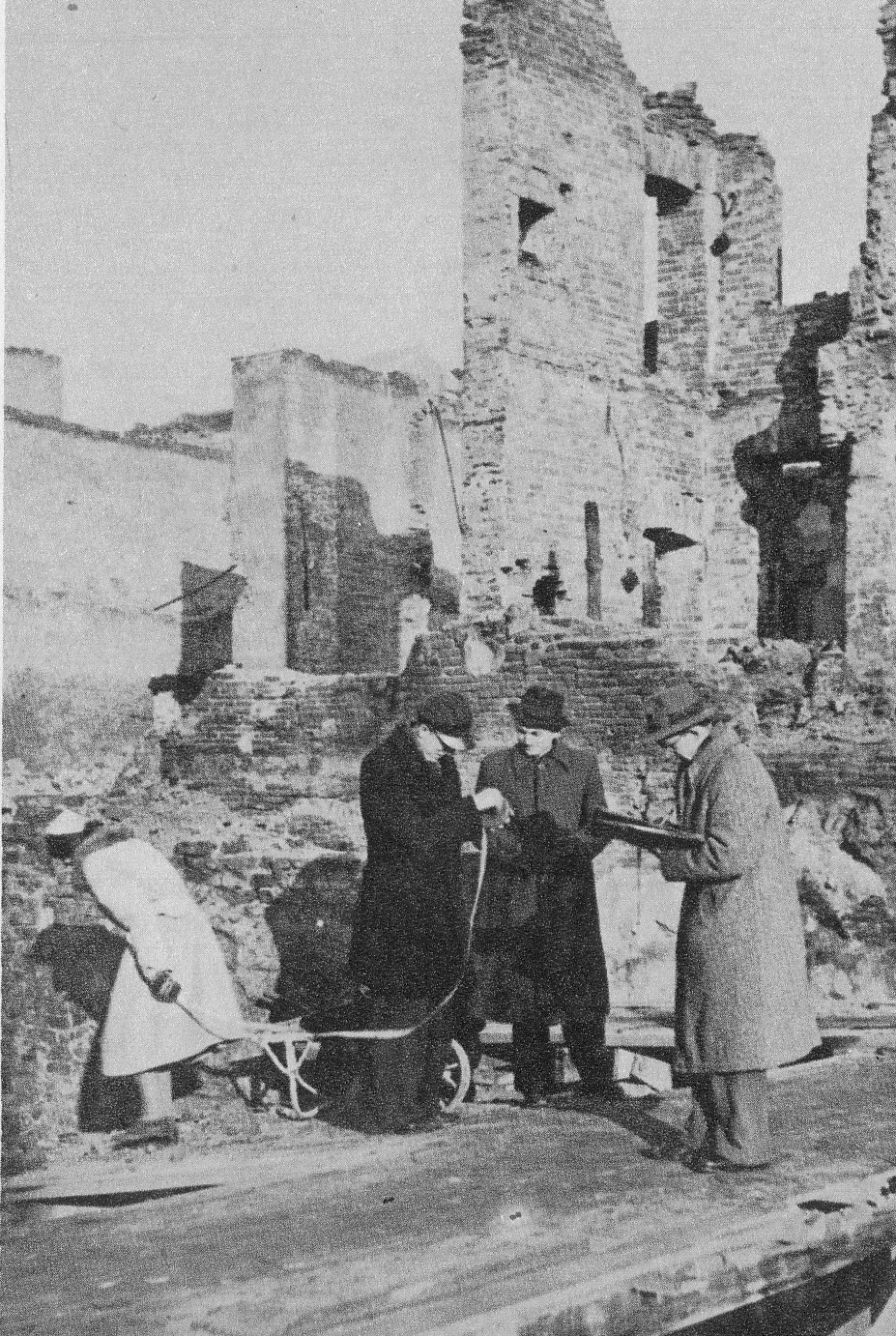
Inventory of destroyed monuments by Warsaw Reconstruction Office employees in 1945

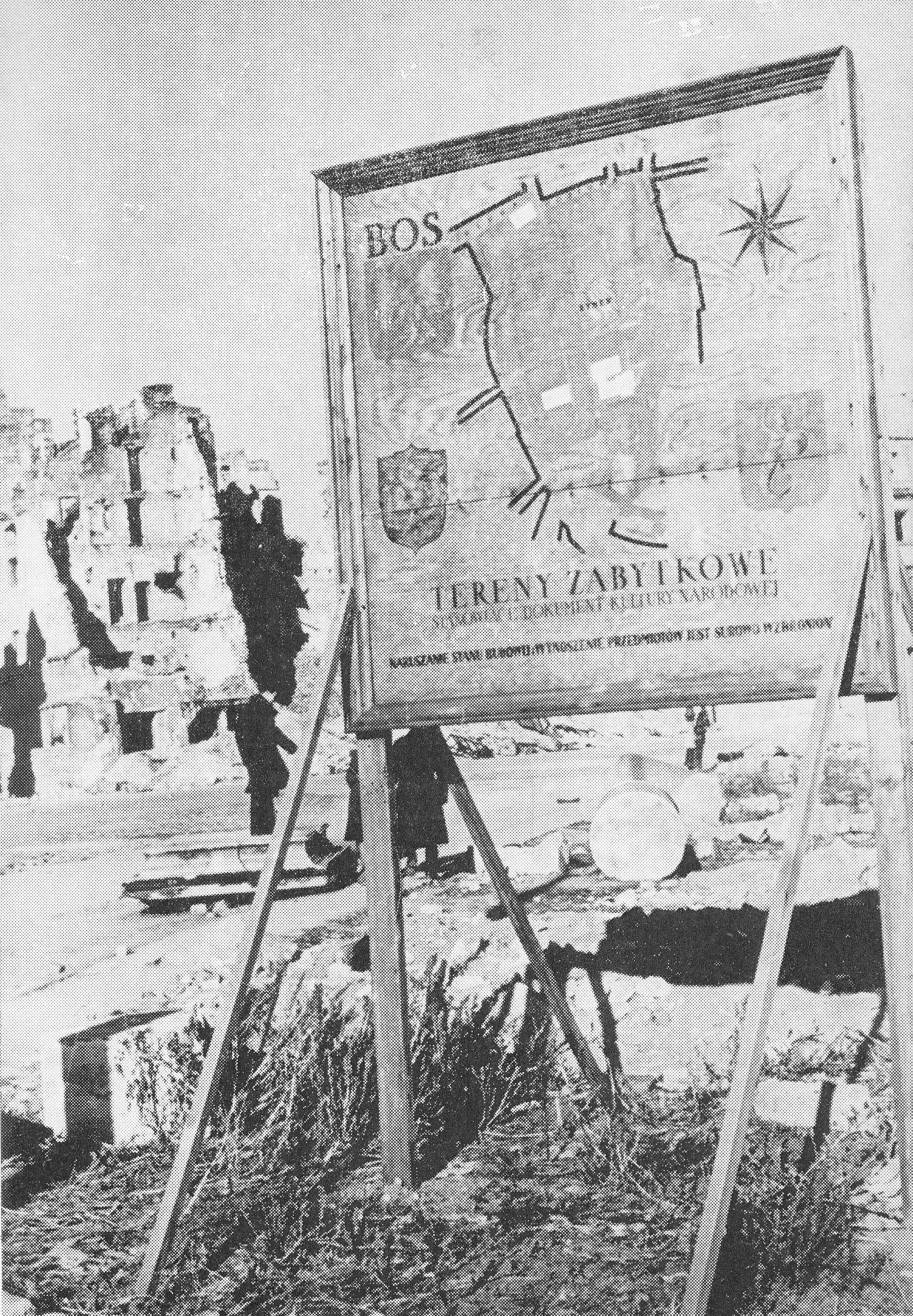
Plaque of the Warsaw Reconstruction Office at Castle Square, Warsaw

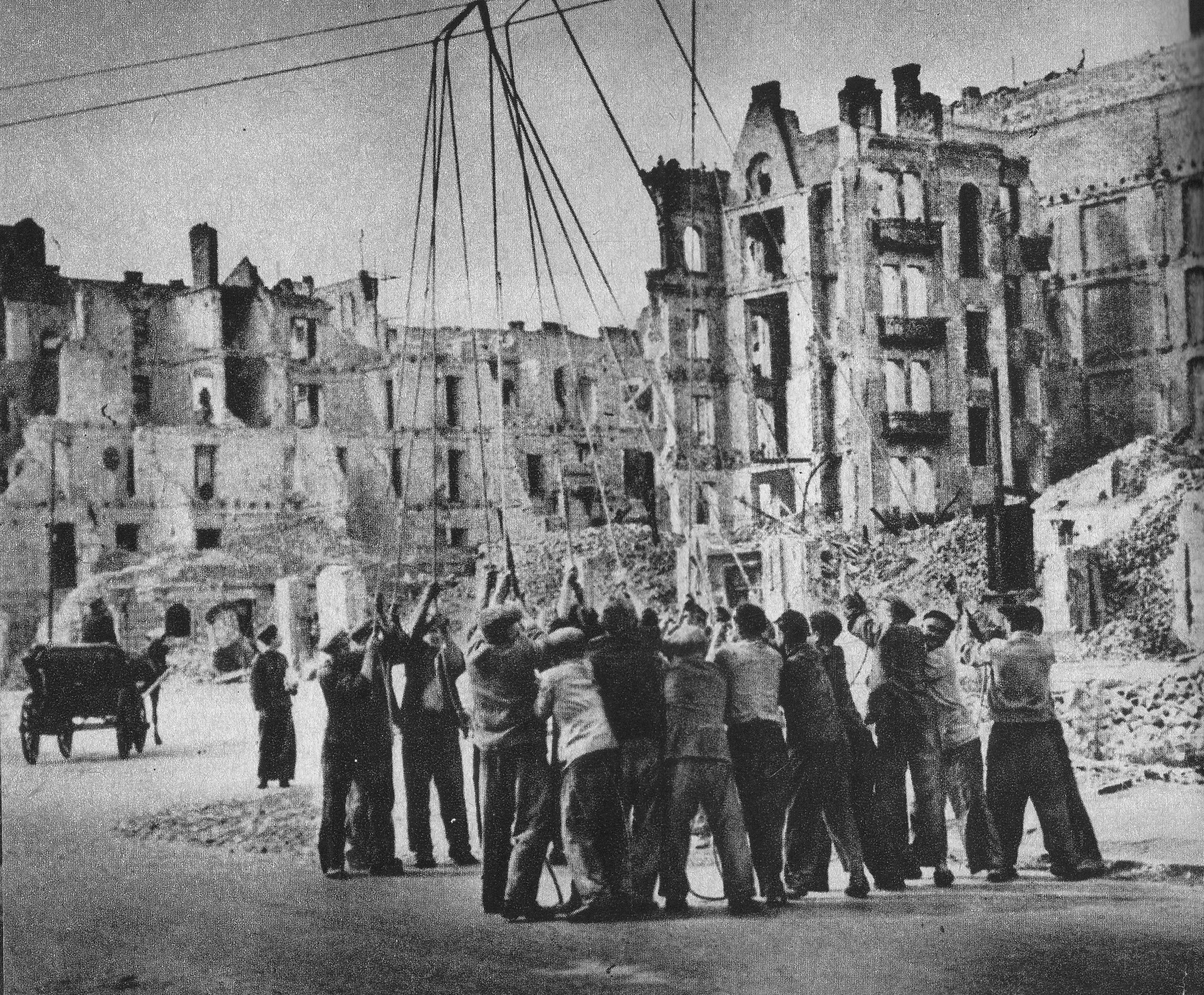
Demolition of damaged buildings at Warsaw Uprising Square in 1945

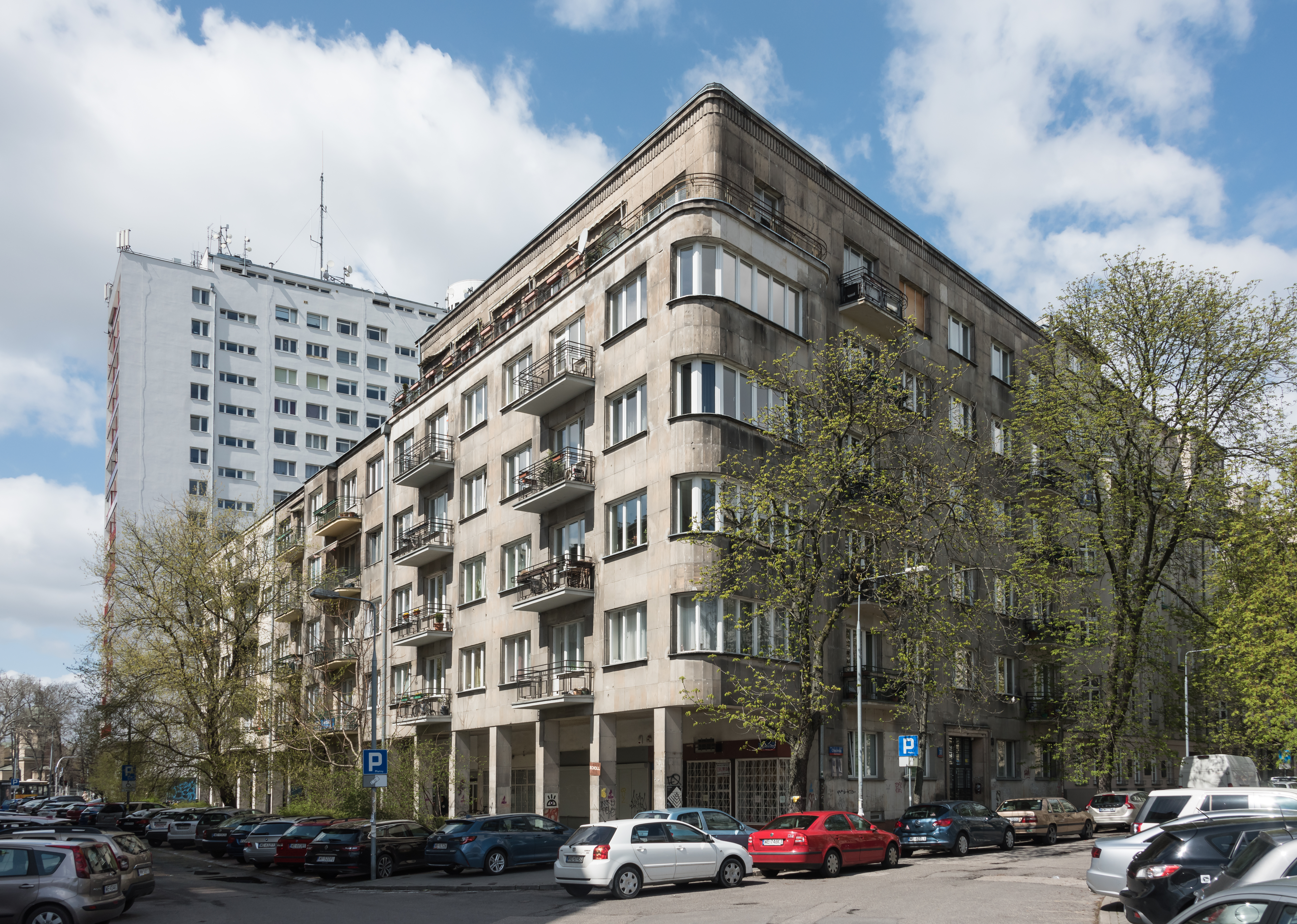
Tenement at 33 Chocimska Street, Warsaw occupied by the Warsaw Reconstruction Office from 1945 to 1951

The Warsaw Reconstruction Office (Polish: Biuro Odbudowy Stolicy, (Note: literal translation in English: Office for the Reconstruction of the Capital) BOS) was a Polish government institution established on 14 February 1945 by a decree of the State National Council to oversee the reconstruction of Warsaw, which had been extensively damaged during World War II.

== History ==
The Warsaw Reconstruction Office was established on 14 February 1945, following the earlier formation of the Office for the Organisation of Warsaw's Reconstruction, created on 22 January 1945 by Mayor Marian Spychalski, led by Jan Zachwatowicz. The municipal decision to form the Warsaw Reconstruction Office was formalized by a decree from the State National Council on 24 May 1945, tasking it with overseeing the reconstruction of the capital.

The office was led by Roman Piotrowski, with Józef Sigalin and Witold Plapis serving as deputy directors. Initially, the Warsaw Reconstruction Office focused on securing and cataloging the surviving remnants of the city's infrastructure.

Its first headquarters were located in Ludwik Tarnowski's tenement (Cooperative Housing Association of the Ministry of Public Works) at 4 Kowelska Street in the Nowa Praga district. In February 1945, the Warsaw Reconstruction Office's secretariat relocated to a tenement at 33 Chocimska Street. As the office expanded, it occupied additional buildings at 35 Chocimska Street, 1 and 3 Skolimowska Street, 3 Sędziowska Street in Ochota, and surviving pavilions of the Ujazdów Hospital. Local Warsaw Reconstruction Office studios were established in less-damaged districts such as Bielany, Żoliborz, Mokotów, and Saska Kępa, while the Historic Architecture Department opened branches in the Old Town and Łazienki Park. Many employees and their families resided at the Jazdów Estate, a settlement of Finnish houses.

The Warsaw Reconstruction Office served as the city's urban planning body, construction administration, building inspection authority, and conservation office. In 1945, it comprised the following departments:

- Urban Planning Department
- Architecture and Engineering Department
- Historic Architecture Department
- Engineering Department
- Economic Planning Department
- Propaganda Department
- Contracts Department
- Supervision Department
- Surveying Department
- Administrative and Economic Department
- Independent Personnel Department
- Independent Control Department
- General Secretariat

In February 1945, a canteen was opened at the Warsaw Reconstruction Office headquarters on Chocimska Street. In May 1945, on the initiative of Józef Sigalin, the office established a sports club with sections for athletics, boxing, association football, shooting sports, water sports, tennis, and winter sports. It also operated a holiday resort in Świder, known as Bosówka.

By July 1945, the Warsaw Reconstruction Office employed approximately 1,500 people, including architects, urban planners, engineers, economists, and lawyers.

The Warsaw Reconstruction Office co-organised the Warsaw Accuses exhibition, which opened on 3 May 1945 at the National Museum in Warsaw. Between March and April 1945, the office conducted the "red plaques" campaign, placing around 800 red plaques on historic structures, often destroyed, with the inscription: Warsaw Reconstruction Office – Historic Building, a Document of National Culture. Altering the Building's Condition is Strictly Prohibited. These efforts underscored the office's focus on preserving architectural heritage. In October 1945, the Warsaw Reconstruction Office launched the weekly magazine Skarpa Warszawska, which was later transformed into Stolica, becoming a platform for urban and social discussions about the city's future. For buildings reconstructed with the office's support, plaques featuring a compass and the inscription National Reconstruction were designed.

From 1947 to 1949, the Warsaw Reconstruction Office oversaw the construction of the East–West Route, including a tunnel beneath Miodowa Street and Krakowskie Przedmieście. By 1952, the office had reconstructed the Old Town, Krakowskie Przedmieście, New World Street, parts of Miodowa Street, Długa Street, Senatorska Street, Theatre Square, and Bank Square. However, these reconstructions were often inconsistent, loosely based on pre-war designs, and occasionally altered their original appearance.

Since 1945, the Warsaw Reconstruction Office's responsibilities were gradually reduced. In August 1945, responsibility for roads and bridges was transferred to the municipal government, and in March 1946, it assumed building inspections. In mid-1946, the Warsaw Reconstruction Directorate took over the office's investment management, and in September 1946, the Historic Architecture Department was dissolved, with its duties transferred to the City Conservation Office. By 1947, the Warsaw Reconstruction Office primarily functioned as an urban planning office. Its staff decreased from 500 in July 1947 to 280 in January 1948, and 193 by June 1948. The office was officially dissolved in 1951 by a Council of Ministers regulation issued on 6 September 1950.

Due to the scale of Warsaw's destruction, the Warsaw Reconstruction Office was humorously referred to as "Boże Odbuduj Stolicę" ("God, Rebuild the Capital").

The office's archives, housed at the State Archives in Warsaw, comprise 14,679 files containing maps, plans, designs, inventory notes, and photographs from 1945 to 1953. The collection is being digitized. In 2011, the Warsaw Reconstruction Office's archives, along with 44 other global archival collections, were added to UNESCO's Memory of the World Register.

== Controversies ==
The Urban Planning Department's actions drew criticism, as many surviving tenements were demolished under the Warsaw Reconstruction Office's orders, even though they required only minor repairs, such as replacing burnt roofs or ceilings. This led to the destruction of large portions of streets, including Chłodna, Elektoralna, Ogrodowa, Graniczna, Leszno, Wolska, and Marszałkowska. There were also instances of ideologically driven destruction of building facades and sculptures, justified as "tidying", "modernizing", or removing "questionable decorations".

== Notable people associated with Warsaw Reconstruction Office ==
Sources:

- Helena Balicka – economist and writer
- Piotr Biegański – architect and conservator
- Jan Bieńkowski – conservator
- Anna Boyé-Guerquin – architect, member of the Grey Ranks
- Teodor Bursche – architect
- Jerzy Brabander – architect
- Barbara Brukalska – architect
- Stanisław Brukalski – architect
- Maria Chodźko-Zachwatowicz – architect
- Jacek Cydzik – architect, conservator, Home Army soldier
- Zofia Cydzikowa – conservator
- Anna Czapska – architect and conservator
- Jan Dąbrowski – architect and conservator
- Krystyna Dobrowolska – architect
- Jan Dobrowolski – architect
- Zofia Döllinger – nurse
- Czesław Duchnowski – architect and urban planner
- Stanisław Dziewulski – architect and urban planner
- Jan Grudziński – architect
- Tadeusz Iskierka – architect
- Stanisław Jankowski, codenamed Agaton – architect, Polish Armed Forces soldier, Silent Unseen, Home Army intelligence officer
- Konstanty Kokozow – architect
- Mikołaj Kokozow – architect
- Halina Kosmólska-Szulc – conservator
- Mieczysław Kuzma – architect, conservator, sculptor
- Longin Majdecki – landscape architect and art historian
- Kazimierz Marczewski – architect and urban planner
- Roman Piotrowski – architect and politician
- Wojciech Piotrowski – architect, Polish Armed Forces soldier
- Wacław Podlewski – architect, urban planner, conservator
- Witold Plapis – architect and landscape architect
- Alina Scholtz – landscape architect
- Kazimierz Adam Saski – architect, urban planner, conservator
- Eleonora Sekrecka – architect
- Józef Sigalin – architect, urban planner, First Polish Army soldier, politician
- Halina Skibniewska – architect, urban planner, politician
- Zygmunt Skibniewski – architect, urban planner, politician
- Marian Spychalski – architect, People's Guard and People's Army soldier, politician
- Helena Syrkus – architect
- Szymon Syrkus – architect, deputy director of Warsaw Reconstruction Office
- Stanisław Szurmak – architect
- Hanna Szwankowska – Warsaw historian
- Włodzimierz Wapiński – architect
- Jerzy Wasilewski – architect
- Jan Zachwatowicz – architect and conservator
- Juliusz Wojciech Zamecznik – poster artist and photographer
- Stanisław Zamecznik – architect, visual artist, exhibition designer, graphic designer, set designer

== Commemorations ==
- On 14 February 1985, a commemorative plaque was unveiled on the façade of the tenement at 33 Chocimska Street, reading: In this building, on 14 February 1945, the Warsaw Reconstruction Office began its work. The plaque later disappeared under unclear circumstances. In April 2020, a new informational plaque, part of Warsaw's Municipal Information System, was unveiled to commemorate the Warsaw Reconstruction Office.
- In September 2020, a park alley running from Crossroads Square to Jazdów Street was named Warsaw Reconstruction Office Alley.

== Bibliography ==
- Piątek, Grzegorz (2020). Najlepsze miasto świata. Warszawa w odbudowie 1944–1949 [The Best City in the World: Warsaw Rebuilt 1944–1949] (in Polish). Warsaw: W.A.B. ISBN 978-83-280-3725-0.
