= Helena Syrkus =

Polish architect, urban planner and educator

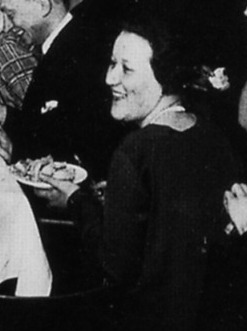
- Syrkus at a banquet in honour of Kazimir Malevich's exhibition at the Polonia Palace, 1927
- Born: Helena Eliasberg; May 14, 1900; Warsaw, Warsaw Governorate, Congress Poland
- Died: November 19, 1982 (aged 82); Warsaw, Warsaw Voivodeship, Polish People's Republic
- Resting place: Powązki Military Cemetery
- Other name: Niemirowska
- Education: University of Warsaw
- Occupation: Architect
- Era: 20th century
- Employer: Warsaw Reconstruction Office
- Organizations: Praesens; CIAM
- Known for: Signatory to the Stockholm Appeal
- Political party: Polish United Workers' Party
- Other political affiliations: Polish Workers' Party
- Movement: Modernism
- Spouse: Szymon Syrkus

Helena Syrkus (May 14, 1900 – November 19, 1982) was a Polish architect, urban planner and educator.

== Biography ==
She was born Helena Eliasberg in Warsaw and studied architecture at the Warsaw Technical Academy from 1918 to 1923. In 1922, she changed her surname to Niemirowska. Syrkus also studied drawing with Roman Kramsztyk and philosophy at the University of Warsaw. She was a co-founder of the avant-garde Praesens group. She was also a member of the Congrès Internationaux d'Architecture Moderne (CIAM) and served as vice-chairperson from 1945 to 1954. In 1950, she began lecturing on architecture at the Polish Technical Academy.

She was an editor of the Athens Charter.

She married Szymon Syrkus in 1925.

During the 1930s Syrkus and her husband developed the Na Rakowcu housing project for workers. After World War II she worked on plans for the reconstruction of the city of Warsaw. With her husband, she worked on the Na Kole estate in Warsaw, which housed 10,000 residents, between 1948 and 1952.

She became a member of the Polish Workers' Party in 1944 and of the Polish United Workers' Party in 1948.

Books by Syrkus included Ku idei osiedla społecznego ("Toward the Idea of the Social Estate") (1976) and Społeczne cele urbanizacji ("The Social Aims of City Planning") (1984).

Syrkus died in Warsaw at the age of 82.
