= Katarzyna Kobro =

Polish sculptor (1898–1951)

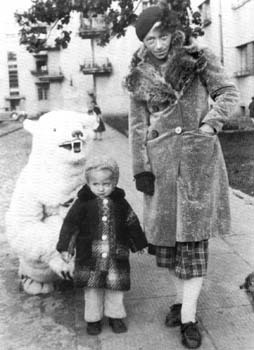
- Katarzyna Kobro with her daughter in 1938
- Born: 26 January 1898; Moscow, Russian Empire
- Died: 21 February 1951 (aged 53); Łódź, Poland
- Known for: Sculpting
- Movement: Constructivism
- Spouse: Władysław Strzemiński (m. 1920, divorced)

Katarzyna Kobro (26 January 1898 – 21 February 1951) was a Polish avant-garde sculptor and a prominent representative of the Constructivist movement in Poland. A pioneer of innovative multi-dimensional abstract sculpture, she rejected Aestheticism and advocated for the integration of spatial rhythm and scientific advances into visual art.

Born in Moscow to a family of mixed German and Russian heritage, Kobro immigrated to Poland in the 1920s where she produced most of her work. Together with her husband, Władysław Strzemiński, she worked on the concept of Spatiality by incorporating spatial composition as well as prefabricated elements and industrial or man-made products into sculpture.

== Early life ==
Katarzyna Kobro was born on 26 January 1898 in Moscow, in what was then the Russian Empire, to a multicultural family. Her father, Nikolai Alexander Michael von Kobro, came from a family of Baltic Germans from present-day Latvia, and her mother, Evgenia Rozanov, was Russian.

She spent her early years in Riga, then moved with her family to Moscow in 1915. From 1917 to 1920, she studied at the Moscow School of Painting, Sculpture and Architecture. She was a member of the Moscow Union of Artists with Kazimir Malevich, Olga Rozanova, Lyubov Popova, Vladimir Tatlin, and Alexander Rodchenko, among others. In 1920, Kobro married Polish artist Władysław Strzemiński (1893–1952). At the beginning of 1922, she fled to Poland and in 1924, obtained Polish citizenship.

== Career ==
The couple established themselves in the small Polish town of Szczekociny and later relocated to Koluszki, where they worked as teachers. In 1926, Kobro co-founded the Praesens Group with architects Bohdan Lachert and Szymon Syrkus, but left the group in 1929 over content differences. Kobro, Strzemiński, painter Henryk Stażewski, and poets Jan Brzękowski and Julian Przyboś then founded a.r. group, an initialization that is usually interpreted as "Revolutionary Artists" or "Real Avant-Garde".

She was instrumental in the establishment of the Museum of Art in Łódź. In 1932, she and her husband joined the Abstraction-Création group. In 1937, Kobro signed the 1936 Dimensionist Manifesto published by Jean Arp, Marcel Duchamp, and László Moholy-Nagy.

== Style ==
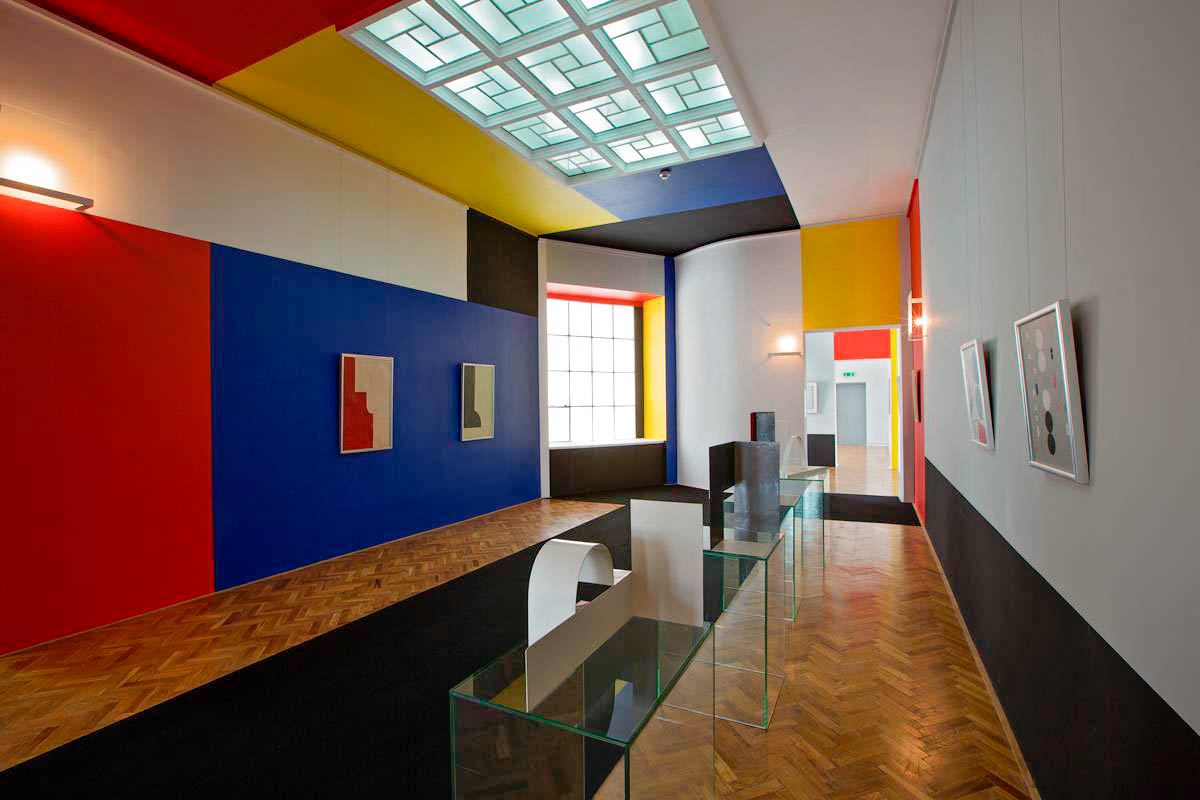
Strzemiński's Sala Neoplastyczna (Neoplastic Room) at the Museum of Art in Łódź featuring sculptures by Kobro.

Kobro was one of the most progressive interwar avant-garde artists. Under the influence of Constructivism, she rejected the concepts of Aestheticism, individualism and subjectivism, and instead postulated the absolute objectivism of form. Her main aim was to build an abstract work of art, based on universal and objective rules discovered through experimentation and spatial analysis.

Her sculpture conceptualized infinite space, which was to be seen as uniform and without focal or reference points, such as the origin of a coordinate system. Therefore, she strove to organize space in such a way that it would not be divided into space enclosed within form and excluded from it, but instead for the work to coexist with space and to allow space to penetrate it.

== Legacy ==
Kobro's unique spatial compositions had a considerable impact on various modern artists, among others on the Belgian sculptor and painter Georges Vantongerloo whose sculptures evolved in the course of the 1920s and 1930 under the influence of Kobro's work. Her works have been exhibited in museums around the world including Centre Pompidou, Museo Reina Sofia, Museum of Modern Art, Moderna Museet Malmö, and Whitechapel Gallery.

On 12 December 2012, the International Astronomical Union named a crater located in the southern hemisphere of Mercury in honor of Kobro.

Kobro's work was included in the 2021 exhibition Women in Abstraction at the Centre Pompidou.

On 26 January 2022, Google featured a Doodle to commemorate her 124th birthday.

== See also ==
- List of Polish sculptors
- Art in Poland
- Constructivism
