= Marcin Stańczyk =

Polish composer (1977-)

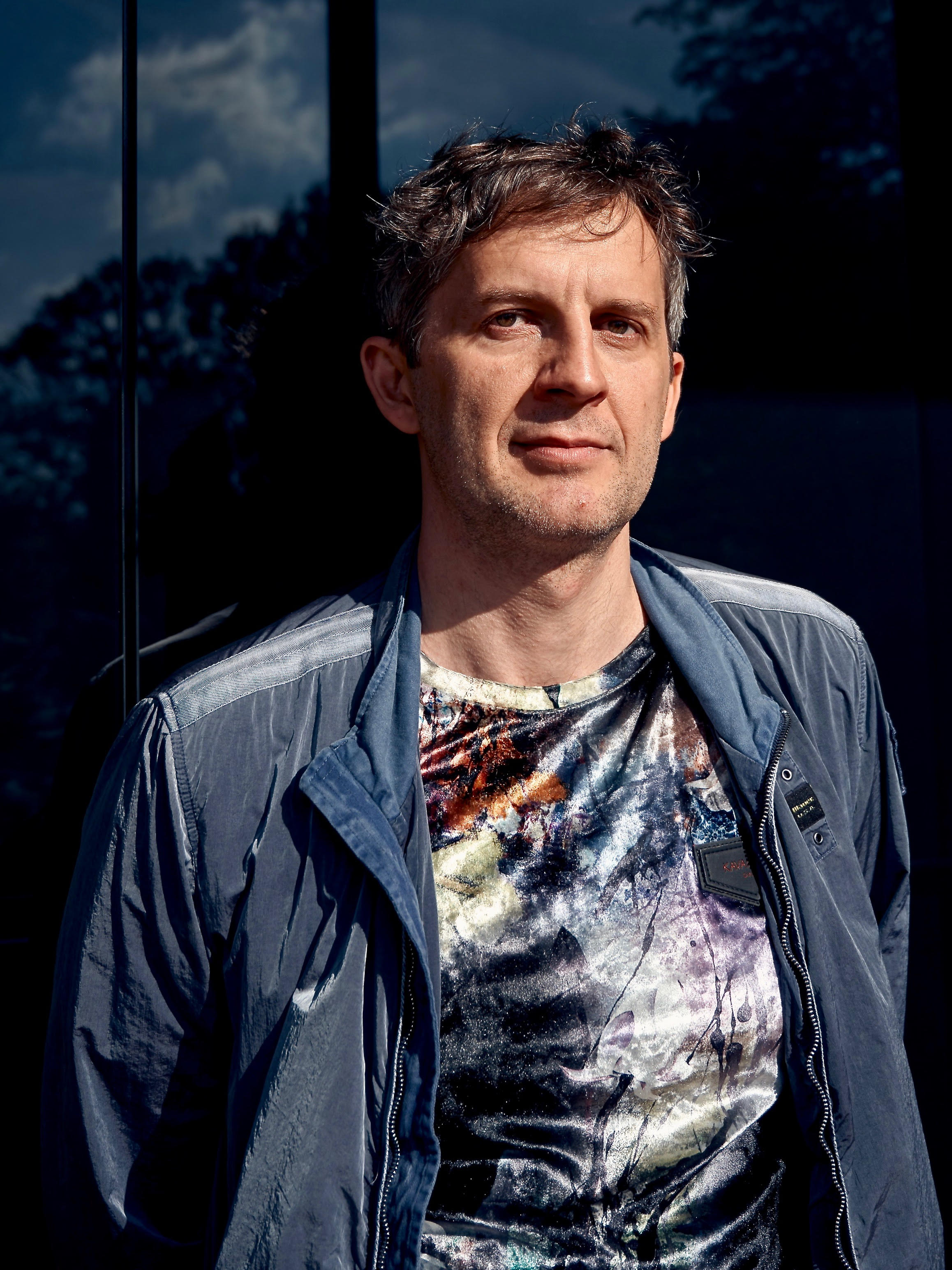
- Born: 16 November 1977 (age 48); Łęczyca, Poland
- Occupations: Composer, Lawyer, Pedagogue, Music Theorist

Marcin Stańczyk (born November 16, 1977, in Łęczyca, Poland) – Polish composer, lawyer, pedagogue and music theorist. Laureate of numerous awards, the only Pole to receive the Toru Takemitsu Award. Author of symphonic, chamber, stage, electronic and film music. Creator of multimedia and intermedia spectacles.

== Biography ==
Marcin Stańczyk graduated from the University of Łódź (Law in 2001) and the Academy of Music in Łódź (Music Theory in 2006 and Composition in 2007 as a graduate of Zygmunt Krauze). He then continued to study in Poland and abroad, i.a. completed a post-graduate degree in the Accademia Nazionale di Santa Cecilia in Rome and CURSUS 1 and 2 at IRCAM, Paris. He participated in many workshops and courses, i.a. 13th Young Composers Meeting in Apeldoorn (2007), workshops with Klangforum Wien and Trilok Gurtu during La Biennale di Venezia (2007, 2008), Voix Nouvelles course with Brian Ferneyhough as a part of Royamount Foundation scholarship (2009), Internationale Ferienkurse für Neue Musik in Darmstadt (2010), De Musica ovvero la fabbrica della creatività in Rome with Beat Furrer (2010) and Mark Andre (2012) and also Jerwood Opera Writing Programme in Aldeburgh Centre of Music with Giorgio Battistelli (2011).

His pieces have been commissioned by prestigious festivals and ensembles and performed in Europe, Asia (China, Japan, Israel), North America (USA, Canada), South America (Chile, Cuba) and Australia. He has cooperated with Klangforum Wien, Ensemble InterContemporain, Ensemble MusikFabrik, Neue Vocalsolisten Stuttgart, Ensemble Linea, Elision Ensemble, Bang on a Can All Stars, Tokyo Philharmonic Orchestra, Oslo Sinfonietta, Ensemble Nikel, Algoritmo, Zone Expérimentale Basel, Meitar, E-MEX Ensemble, Divertimento, Orkest de ereprijs, Ensemble Nostri Temporis, Shanghai Philharmonic Orchestra, Sinfonia Varsovia, NOSPR and many others. He has also cooperated with popular music artists, such as Aphex Twin, Zamilska and Pianohooligan (Piotr Orzechowski).

Stańczyk's pieces have been showcased i.a. at Gaudeamus Musik Week in Amsterdam, Biennale Musica during La Biennale di Venezia, Manifeste and Season IRCAM in Paris, Bang On a Can Marathon, Noise Non-ferenc and MATA in New York, Les Espaces Sonores in Basel, Rondò in Milan, Review of Composers in Belgrade, Images sonores in Liège, Nuova Consonanza in Rome, Warsaw Autumn, Sacrum Profanum in Kraków, Festival of Premieres NOSPR in Katowice. In 2018 he was chosen to become the first composer-in-residence at Musica Polonica Nova festival in Wrocław. He has been a guest lecturer at universities in France, Germany, Italy, USA, Great Britain, Israel, China, Norway and Poland.
As a composer he won over a dozen international competitions in Poland, France, Italy, Germany, US, Netherland, Romania, Japan and China, including the prestigious Tōru Takemitsu Award in Tokyo (2013) with the piece SIGHS described by the chairman Sir Harrison Birtwistle as "a virtuoso piece of musical awareness". In 2012, Bang on a Can All-Stars dedicated to him a monographic concert in Krakow.
Stańczyk is a laureate of numerous scholarships, including "Młoda Polska" ("Young Poland", 2007), ones founded by ZAIKS (2007), Ministry of Culture and National Heritage (2007, 2014), Marshal of Lodz Voivodeship (2008, 2009, 2010) and the Witold Lutosławski scholarship (2011, 2013), as well as double Coryphaeus of Polish Music Nominee (2013, 2015, Personality of the Year), an award bestowed by the Polish music community. He was a participant of scholarship programmes and residencies: Bang on a Can Summer Music Festival fellowship in New York (2009), the Italian Government scholarship (2009, 2010), Royamount Foundation scholarship (2009), Internationales Musikinstitut Darmstadt Stipendenpreis (2010), Aldeburgh Center of Music fellowship (2010), SACEM scholarship (2013); and residencies: the artistic residence of the city of Paris and Institut Français, Centre International d'Accueil et d'Échanges des Récollets (2014), Cité Internationale des Arts (2014), The Bogliasco Foundation (2018) and Civitella Ranieri Foundation (2019). In 2017 he was awarded the 'Distinguished for Polish Culture' distinction by the Polish Minister of Culture and National Heritage.

Since 2016 Marcin Stańczyk has been a Polish representative in the cultural cooperation programme between China and 16 European countries "16+1".

He works in the Provincial Administrative Court in Łódź. He is a professor in the Academy of Music in Łódź where he received a D.M.A. degree in 2013 and a Habilitation in 2016. In 2020, he became a full professor. In the term 2020–2024, he held the position of Rector's Proxy for Equal Treatment.

Stańczyk is a member of Polish Composers' Union (ZKP), ZAiKS and Polish Society for Contemporary Music.
His scores are published by PWM Edition.

== Music ==
Marcin Stańczyk is the creator of the idea of "aftersounds", inspired by the optical phenomenon of "afterimage" explored in the 1940s by the avant-gardist Polish painter Władysław Strzemiński. With aftersounds, music comes not only from morfological ‘reflections’ of sound, various "noises, resonances and echoes", but also some psychological aspects of the listening and seeing – something which is not there yet, but will be in a moment, which precede the sound or has remained afterwards. As Marta Tabakiernik states:

The concept of aftersounds can be considered on the level of music material (resonances and reflections of various kinds, contrasts on the sound level) as well as metaphorically (when the composition becomes an afterimage of an external phenomenon).

Stańczyk is also the author of the concept of musique acousmatique instrumentale, defined as "acoustic music that may be experienced as electronic acousmatic music, that is, as sound moving in space without simultaneous observation of moving musicians". The musique acoustique instrumentale genre is represented by such pieces as Blind Walk (2014–15), Some Drops (2016), Sursounds (2018) and Unseen (2017-18). All of these pieces are recommended to be listened to with blindfolds covering the eyes in order to intensify the auditory experience by cancelling visual stimuli. In his compositions he often uses theatrical expressions associated with his idea of a "total performance", earlier described as "theatralization of performance", which engages the musician's entire body to perform a piece (full-body experience). As Anna Wójcikowska describes:

[...] in line with his concept of ‘total performance’, according to which the composer requires from performers their total involvement in the performance (or, some- times, even co-creation) of a work, different types of non-harmonic sounds are of vocal provenance or they are derived from the gestures of a choreographic character. In his scores, Stańczyk often provides one performer with notation on a few staves (e.g. in Three Afterimages for double bass, 2008, or Mosaïque for cello and live electronics, 2011–12) and the notation itself is characterized by unusual meticulousness.

For many years the composer has been underlining the role of imagination – not only of composer or performers, but most importantly of the listeners. The result of his belief is a separate genre of Stańczyk's conceptual pieces, including 4’34’’ – short piece against John Cage (2011) and triptych: Possible Music I (2012), Possible Music II (2015) and Impossible Music (24.02.2022), created on the day of the Russian invasion of Ukraine. In these instances, Stańczyk sees the recipient's imagination as a complement to his compositional ideas, realizing the idea of true freedom of art.

His early musical style was described by composer Ivan Fedele in Il Giornale as “distorsionismo”. In reference to his later works, connections with spectralism or new complexity were pointed out.

== Selected works ==
- Laterna for ensemble and tape (2008)
- Three afterimages for double-bass (2008)
- Afterimages – rosso for piano (2009)
- Nibiru – La rivoluzione della terra sconosciuta for ensemble (2009)
- Analessi Rotte for cello, 2 voices and trombone (2009)
- Sospiri for ensemble (2009)
- Westchnienia (Sighs) for chamber orchestra (2009)
- Il riverbero della malinconia for ensemble (2010)
- Tajemnica Chopina (The Mystery of Chopin) - musical sculpture (cooperation with Łukasz Leszczyński) (2010)
- OPERA 3 for female singer, accompanist and composer (cooperation with Peter Cant) (2010)
- Archeopteryx - ballet music (2011)
- In case of rapture - mini-opera (2011)
- Mosaïque for cello and live electronics (2012)
- Esercizi for students (2006 rev. 2012)
- Geysir – Grisey for ensemble (2005 rev. 2012)
- Muzyka Możliwa I (Possible Music I) (2012, rev. 2015)
- 4'34'' – short piece against J.Cage (2012)
- Le teste scambiate - opera for chamber orchestra and 3 characters (2010 - 2012)
- Attorno for alto flute, cello and piano (2013)
- Muzyka tkana (Woven Music) for orchestra (2013)
- Solarize - chamber opera (2013-2014)
- Aftersounds for 2 percussionists and live electronics (2013-2014)
- Aftersounds for guitar (2014)
- A(pol)ogia - multimedia performance (cooperation with Peter Cant and Alex Eisenberg) (2014)
- Blind walk for ensemble (2014-2015)
- Posłuchy (Afterhearings) for ensemble (2015)
- Powiodki (Afterimages) for voice, string quartet and audio-video live electronics (2015)
- muzyka tkana – powidoki (woven music - afterimages) - audiovisual interactive installation (2016)
- Some Drops for double-bell trumpet and ensemble (2016)
- A due for Fender Rhodes, string orchestra and electronics (2017)
- Dancing Dune for chamber orchestra of Chinese traditional instruments (2017)
- Sursounds for string quartet, wind quintet and electronics (2018)
- Kobro/ Strzemiński. Opowieść fantastyczna (Kobro/ Strzemiński. Fantastic story) - film music, dir. by Borys Lankosz (2018)
- Ciemno, prawie noc (Dark, almost night) - film music, dir. by Borys Lankosz (2018)
- Afterthoughts - multimedia spectacle (2018)
- Unseen for female voice, ensemble and electronics (2017-2018)
- Western Whiffs I for guzheng, vibraphone and yangqin (2019)
- Muzyka Możliwa II (Possible Music II) (2020)
- Aftersounds for flute solo (2020–21)
- Aftersounds II for guitar solo (2021)
- Live for saxophones, symphonic orchestra and electronics (2021)
- Impossible Music (24.02.2022) (2022)
- Quatre chants sur ce qui n’existe plus for flute (alto flute), tuba, guitar, cello and tape (2023)
- After for female voice, ensemble, video and electronics (2024)

== Monographic Albums ==
- Chamber Music, DUX (DUX0757), 2015
- Acousmatic Music, double CD, Anaklasis/PWM (ANA 015), 2021
- Mosaïque, Kairos (0015108KAI), 2021
- Dark, Almost Night, DUX (DUX1818), 2021
- Chamber Works (re-edition), DUX (DUX1117), 2023
