= A.r. group =

Polish avant-garde artists collective

a.r. group
- Years active: 1929–1930s
- Location: Second Polish Republic
- Major figures: Katarzyna Kobro; Henryk Stażewski; Władysław Strzemiński
- Influences: Praesens and Abstraction-Création

The a.r. group (Polish: artyści rewolucyjni or awangarda rzeczywista – "revolutionary artists" or "real avant-garde") was an avant-garde art group set up by Władysław Strzemiński, Katarzyna Kobro, and Henryk Stażewski in 1929, who had previously been members of Blok and Praesens.

Rather than creating its own magazine the a.r. group issued short irregular bulletins, the first in March 1930, followed by a second in December 1932. They also published a series of avant-garde books, which formed the a.r. collection. Nevertheless, through the a.r. group, Strzemiński was able to set up the first International Collection of Modern Art in Europe, based in Łódź.
