= Abstraction-Création =

Association of artists (Paris, 1931)

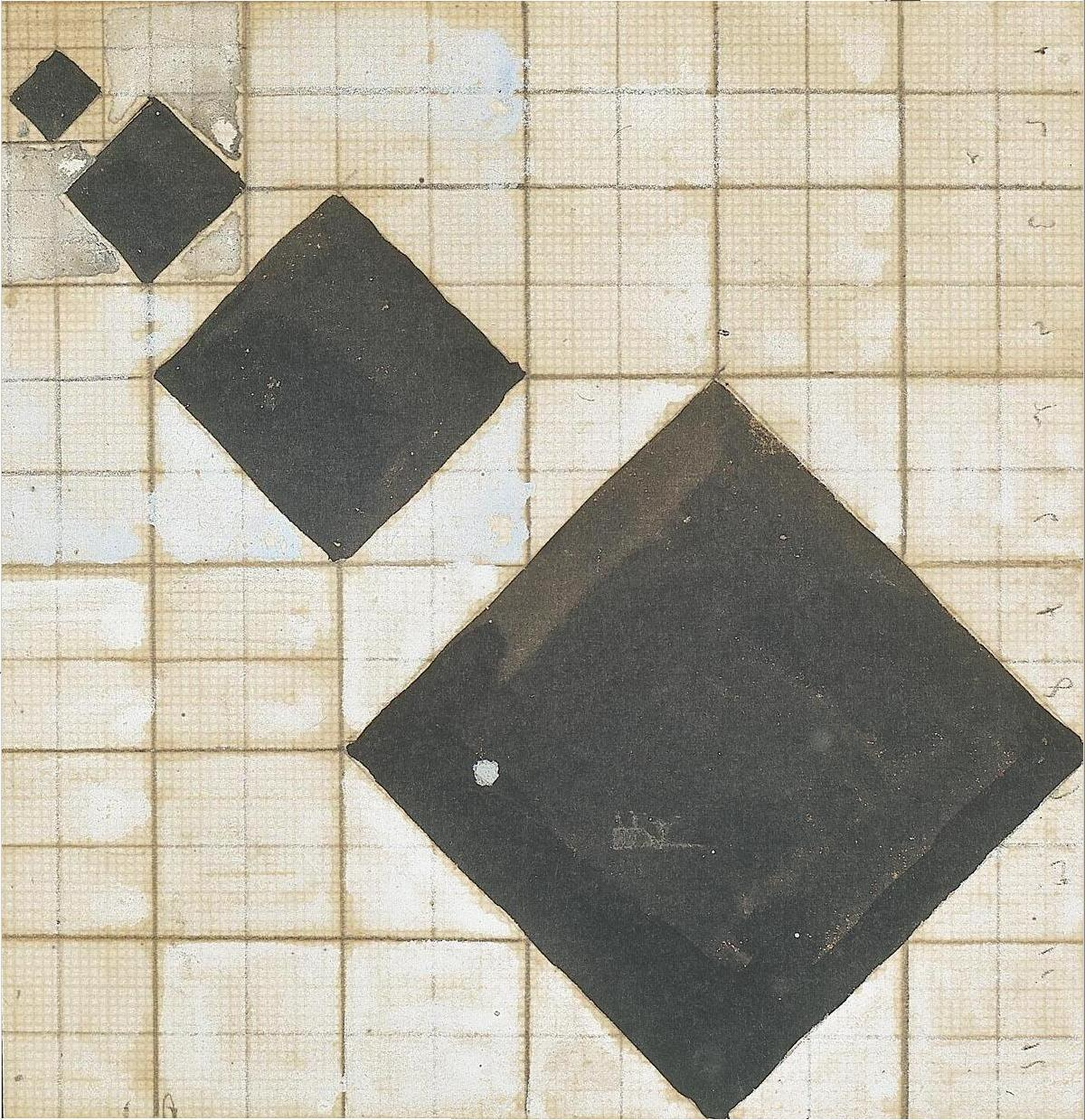
- Theo van Doesburg, c. 1929–30, Study for Arithmetic Composition, pencil, Indian ink and gouache on graph paper, 12 × 12 cm, Kröller-Müller Museum
- Years active: 1932–1936
- Location: Paris, French Third Republic
- Major figures: Theo van Doesburg; Auguste Herbin; Jean Hélion; Georges Vantongerloo
- Influences: a.r. group
- Influenced: Salon des Réalités Nouvelles

Abstraction-Création was a loose association of artists formed in Paris in 1931 to counteract the influence of the Surrealist group led by André Breton.

Founders Theo van Doesburg, Auguste Herbin, Jean Hélion and Georges Vantongerloo started the group to foster abstract art after the trend turned to representation in the 1920s.

A non-prescriptive group of artists were involved in Abstraction-Création, whose ideals and practices varied widely: Albert Gleizes, František Kupka, Piet Mondrian, Jean Arp, Alexander Calder, Marlow Moss, Naum Gabo, Alberto Magnelli, Barbara Hepworth, Ben Nicholson, Kurt Schwitters, Wassily Kandinsky, Wolfgang Paalen, Théo Kerg, Taro Okamoto, Paule Vézelay, Hans Erni, Bart van der Leck, Katarzyna Kobro, Henryk Stażewski, Leon Tutundjian and John Wardell Power.

Five Cahiers (yearbooks) were published between 1932 and 1936 entitled Abstraction-création: Art non-figuratif; a reprint edition of the Cahiers was published by the Arno Press, New York in 1968. Art exhibitions were also held throughout Europe.

== Reading ==
- Alan Fowler. Constructivist Art in Britain 1913 - 2005. University of Southampton. 2006. PhD Thesis.
