= Teresa Żarnowerówna =

Polish artist and architect (c. 1895/97 – 1949)

- Born: 16 December 1897; Warsaw, Poland
- Died: 3 April 1949 (aged 51); New York, New York
- Known for: Painting
- Movement: Avant-garde

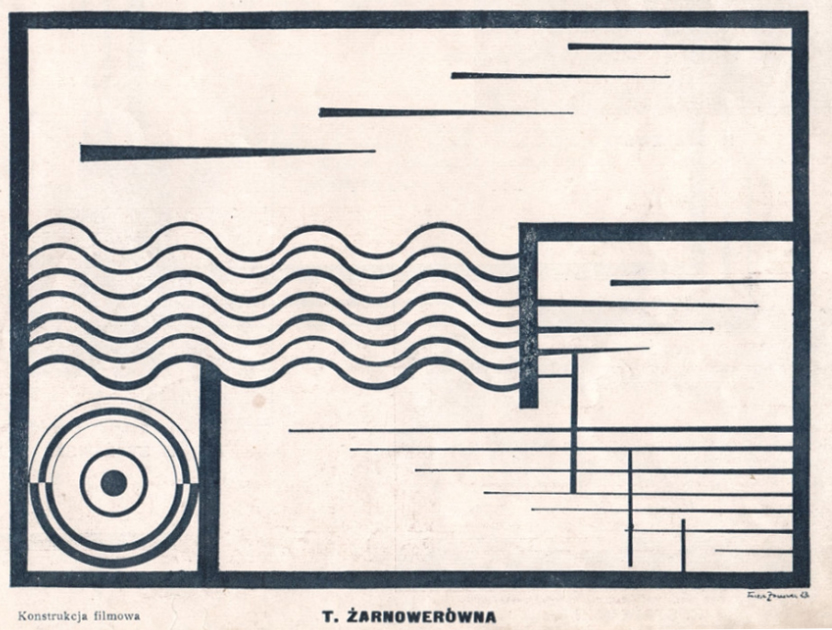
Film Composition, 1924

Teresa Żarnowerówna (or Żarnower; c. 1895–1897 – April 30, 1949) was a Polish avant-garde artist, painter, sculptor, scenographer, and architect.

== Personal life ==
Teresa Żarnowerówna was born in Targówek, Warsaw in either 1895 or 1897 (sources cannot agree) in a Polonized (assimilated) Jewish family. She had a brother, David Żarnower. She had an affair with a fellow artist and mountaineer Count Mieczysław Szczuka until his climbing accident death in 1927. In 1937, due to the increasingly precarious position of communists in Poland, she left to live in Paris, Spain, Portugal, and Canada, and eventually arrived as a refugee in the US, where she would remain until her early death.

She died 30 April 1949 at her apartment on 15 West 67th Street. The New York Times reported she "died unexpectedly" at age 48. It is said that she died soon after receiving a letter from her brother, who wrote that he had survived World War II and was in Russia. In her New York flat, a letter was found at her side, of which she had managed to write only one sentence: "The joy that you are alive will probably kill me..." However, this is unconfirmed. Other sources suggest that she committed suicide after many years of loneliness and financial hardship.

== Artistic style and career ==
Żarnowerówna is known for being a very versatile artist. She created sculptures and geometric abstract compositions painted on canvas or made in the form of color linocuts and drawings. She produced photo-montages, book covers, typography designs and propaganda posters, and participated in architectural projects. Her work was generally influenced by Russian Constructivism and the Dutch De Stijl movement. Her early paintings have been lost, but according to surviving descriptions, they depicted geometric, typographic compositions composed of diagonal lines, which introduced dynamism. Similarly, her abstract sculptures designed on the basis of the opposition between concave and convex planes have not been preserved. What works that were preserved can be found in the Museum of Art in Łódź.

From 1915 to 1920, Żarnowerówna studied at the Warsaw School of Fine Arts in Edward Wittig's sculpture studio. Her early sculptures show the influence of Wittig and of French sculptor Aristide Maillol, but with an increased attention to abstracted geometric volumes. At the Warsaw School of Fine Arts, Żarnowerówna met Henryk Stażewski, Maria Łucja Nicz-Borowiakowa, and Szczuka. The four of them would later constitute the core of the Polish Constructivist avant-garde during the inter-war period, and she is considered a pioneer in the field.

Originally, she focused on sculpture. In 1920, her diploma work Akt won a prize in a sculpture competition organized by the Ministry of Art and Culture. In 1921, she made her debut in the Spring Salon of the Towarzystwo Zachęty Sztuk Pięknych (Society for Fine Arts Promotion) in Warsaw. She collaborated with Szczuka, and together they displayed their works at the 1923 Wystawa Nowej Sztuki (Exhibition of New Art) in Vilnius, and in Berlin's Der Sturm gallery. During the same time period she created Spatial Construction Sketch, which was followed by the Typography Compositions and New Compositions series in 1924. After 1924, she became less interested in painting and sculpture and turned her attention to socially useful art, such as typography, graphics, book and newspaper design, posters, photomontages, and architectural design. Szczuka and Żarnowerówna were the only artists to engage in political photomontage in Poland at the time.

In 1926, she participated in the International Exhibition of Modern Art in Bucharest and in the First International Exhibition of Architecture in Warsaw, where she showed her projects of modern co-operative blocks of apartments, prepared together with Szczuka. While none of these projects were ever built, they became part of the history of Polish avant-garde architecture. One of them, called Garden Homes in Garden Cities (1927), was an interesting reference to Le Corbusier's idea of linking architecture with its environment.

Szczuka and Żarnowerówna were co-creators of the "Grupa Kubistów, Konstruktywistów i Suprematystów Blok" (Cubists, Constructivists, and Suprematists group), the first Polish constructivist artistic group in Warsaw. Żarnowerówna co-edited the group's magazine, Blok, Czasopismo Awangardy Artystycznej (Blok, The Magazine of Artistic Avant-garde), as well as Szczuka's magazine, Dźwignia (The Lever), from his death until July 1928. Both magazines serve as the primary source of information about her work as most of her original works are lost. Blok disbanded in 1926 due to artistic differences amongst its members. After Szczuka's death in 1927, Żarnowerówna completed many of his works, including the cover for Anatol Stern's (1899–1968) poem Europa in 1929.

During her time in the U.S., she had a solo exhibit, called 16 Gouaches, at Peggy Guggenheim's Art of This Century Gallery in 1946. This particular exhibition was recently partially reconstructed by the Museum of Art in Łódź. Shortly thereafter she took part in The Jewish Museum's inaugural exhibition in 1947.

== Political art and views ==
Żarnowerówna had left-wing views, and many of her posters, print designs, and photomontages were a mixture of political propaganda and avant-garde art. Through her brother David, a doctor and an avid member of the Polish Communist Party, she was acquainted with Marxist ideology and became involved in the revolutionary movements taking place during the inter-war period. In 1928, she designed a whole series of election posters for the left-wing Workers and Peasants Unity party along with party leaflets. She also designed the graphic layout of a number of magazines: The Forge, a Worker Youth Monthly (1927), Literary Monthly (1929), and the publication of the Central Committee of the Polish Communist International section, Czerwony Sztandar (The Red Banner, 1931). In 1931 she signed the manifesto against torture of political prisoners. However, shortly thereafter Żarnowerówna ceased her artistic activities.

During her turbulent flight from Poland to the United States, Żarnowerówna created a cycle of photo-montages for the book The Defense of Warsaw, which sought to publicize Polish suffering during, and in the aftermath of, the German destruction of the city of Warsaw. Żarnowerówna later worked on a monumental bias-relief sculpture devoted to the Warsaw Ghetto uprising (it was never completed).
