= Barbara Brukalska =

Polish architect

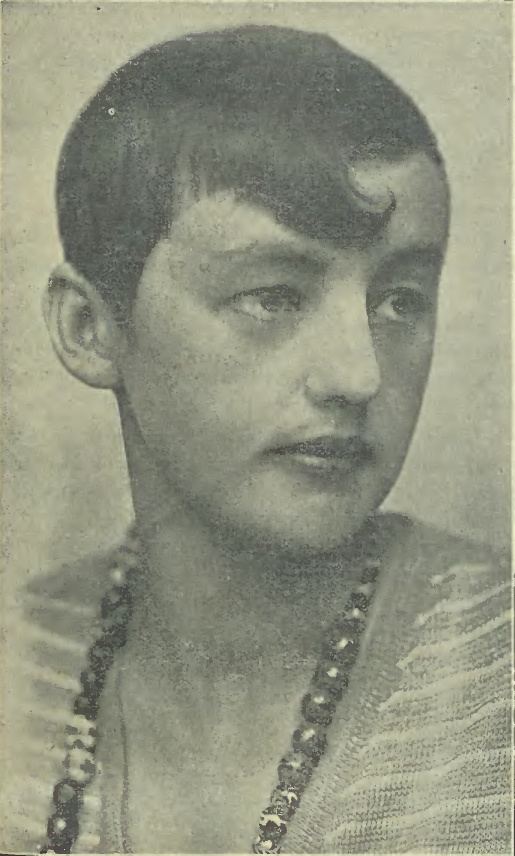
- Born: 4 December 1899; Brzeźce, Masovian Voivodeship
- Died: 6 March 1980 (aged 80); Warsaw
- Occupation: Architect
- Spouse: Stanisław Brukalski
- Practice: Warsaw Polytechnic
- Design: Praesens group

Barbara Brukalska (4 December 1899 - 6 March 1980) was a Polish architect, an architectural theorist, a prominent exponent of Functionalism, a member of the Praesens group, and a professor at Warsaw Polytechnic. She was also the wife of architect Stanisław Brukalski.

== Life ==
Brukalska was born in Brzeźce, Masovian Voivodeship. Her early work was with her husband, Stanisław Brukalski. Like other members of the avant-garde Praesens group (founded in 1926), influenced by Le Corbusier's idea of the "machine for living", they advocated for inexpensive, residential housing that emphasized pure, simple functionality. Brukalska's ideas for the interiors of affordable homes for workers included combining in one room the functions of kitchen and dining room, limiting furnishings to the simplest and most indispensable, and a system of built-in closets, tabletops, sinks and stoves designed to be practical and hygienic. For the kitchen-dining area, she also insisted on white-painted walls, white linoleum, and white surface coverings to bring it as close as possible to the conditions of a laboratory. She declared that "we present the kitchens already furnished, since no one would be capable of fitting their tables and sideboards - often so irrationally designed -- into this small space" From 1927 to 1938, the Brukalskis also worked together designing the interiors of passenger ships.

Because of prevailing economic conditions, project financing for workers' residences was problematic, and workers themselves were not eager to live in such extremely functionalist homes. Despite these setbacks, the Brukalskis persisted in their idealistic vision through the mid-1930s. They continued to design simplified furniture — for a "Smallest Apartment" exhibition (1930), an "Interior" competition organized by the Institute for Propaganda Art Propaganda (1932), and an exhibition held in houses of the Warsaw Society of Workers Estates (1935).

Stanisław Brukalski was interned in a German administered POW camp from 1939 to 1944. After World War II Brukalska and her husband worked more independently, mostly in Warsaw, although both turned away from the strictures of Functionalist style and toward more organic forms inspired by historical precedent. Brukalska designed, among other things, a housing development in Okęcie and the Matysiak Retirement Home. They were also both appointed to the faculty of Warsaw Polytechnic. She died in Warsaw.

== Major works ==
- Housing complexes IV, VII, and IX in Żoliborz district Housing Cooperative (1927-1939)
- 8 Niegolewski St. in Warsaw (1927-1928)
- Reconstruction of Dom pod Orłami (House under the Sign of the Eagles) in Warsaw (1948-1950)
- Matysiak House in Warsaw (1956)
- Church in Troszyn (1956-1975)
- Housing development in Okęcie district of Warsaw(1960)
- House of Parliament, interior (1964)
- Church in Sypniew (1971-1974)
