= Spatiality (architecture) =

Spatiality is a term used in architecture for characteristics that, looked at from a certain aspect, define the quality of a space. In comparison to the term spaciousness, which includes formal, dimensional determination of size—depth, width or height—spatiality is a higher category term. It includes not only formal but other qualities of space—such as definition, openness, visibility, expressivity, etc.

Spatiality in architecture is achieved in different ways, by using one of the design principles. In a general sense, the principles are classified into: a) those that use space organisation to determine or redefine boundaries, and b) those that use visual treatment to create a perceptive experience of its extension. In the physical sense, the principles can refer to:

- space volume (open plan, flexibility, enfilade, and circular connection),
- space surface (overlapping and gradation of planes), and
- materialisation of elements or surfaces.

Spatiality can be defined by the user of the space or the designer of the space. In attempts to find a clearance to sleep within, homeless or unhoused individuals seek public spaces as temporary homes. Spatiality is used within an architectural context to prevent unhoused individuals from residing in these spaces. It often targets people who use or rely on public space more than others, like people who are homeless and youth which can be referred to as hostile architecture. Hostile architecture is defined as "an urban design strategy in which public spaces and structures are used to prevent certain activities or restrict certain people from using those spaces." The formal qualities of design and architecture aid in defining the quality of a space as unfit for a specific sub culture of individuals. "The form, function, and meaning of public space differ across numerous cultural traditions and is influenced by varying degrees of social and political control." Using objects like spikes, metal teeth, metal bars, large bolts, dividers, and steep ledges are all physical qualities that go unnoticed but serve a purpose of keeping individuals out of that physical space, preventing them from resting in that space and deterring the use of that space. An example is youth skateboarding where forms of exclusionary architecture prevent them from specific behaviours like riding on the sides of railings or buildings. Another example of exclusionary architecture is reduced public seating in train stations or at bus stops that restrict not only intended groups like unhoused individuals but those who require extra accessibility aid. Using formal qualities and defining the spatiality can control the behaviours of those intended but inhibit behaviours of others unintentionally. The designed spaces that include hostile aspects and restrict or exclude (exclusionary architecture) individuals are creating a designed experience for those that reside within it. By preventing individuals from sleeping on a park bench, the experience in that space is changed for the individual looking for a place to sleep and it is also changed for those who what have coexisted in that public space.

== Social spatialization (architecture) ==
Social spatialization (social spatiality) is a concept that can be defined within the realm of architecture as a mode of being, a manner of 'seeing; and way of doing'. Alongside the term spatiality, social spatialization focuses on cultural affordance which is defined in psychology as the possibility of an action or event taking place in relation to the user and an object within a particular context. It is important to consider spatiality in a social and cultural context within a range of different professional disciplines and practices including but not limited to philosophy, the natural sciences, art, and poetry.

An example of social spatiality applied within an architectural context is Kabyle houses. The Kabyle house and the Berber culture were a North African community and group of people studied by Bourdieu. The Kabyle house divides the different areas of the house through formal qualities of design. The relationship between the house and the outside world and the affordances offered are connected to the roles of the male and female culture. Women take responsibility for the dark, interior of the home and look after the water, cooking, and manure. They stay within the house and the garden while the male spends their time outside the home working in agriculture. The layout of the homes reflect these roles, the lower part of the home is reserved for the humans and the tasks to be performed including procreation, death, and forms of intimacy must be completed in this section of the home. Bourdieu outlines that the social identities and actions of the Berber people is mirrored by their designed space. Each role is reflected back in the hierarchy of their space, the objects that reside within them and light or direction of the sun it follows.
