= Vytautas Kairiūkštis =

Lithuanian constructivist artist

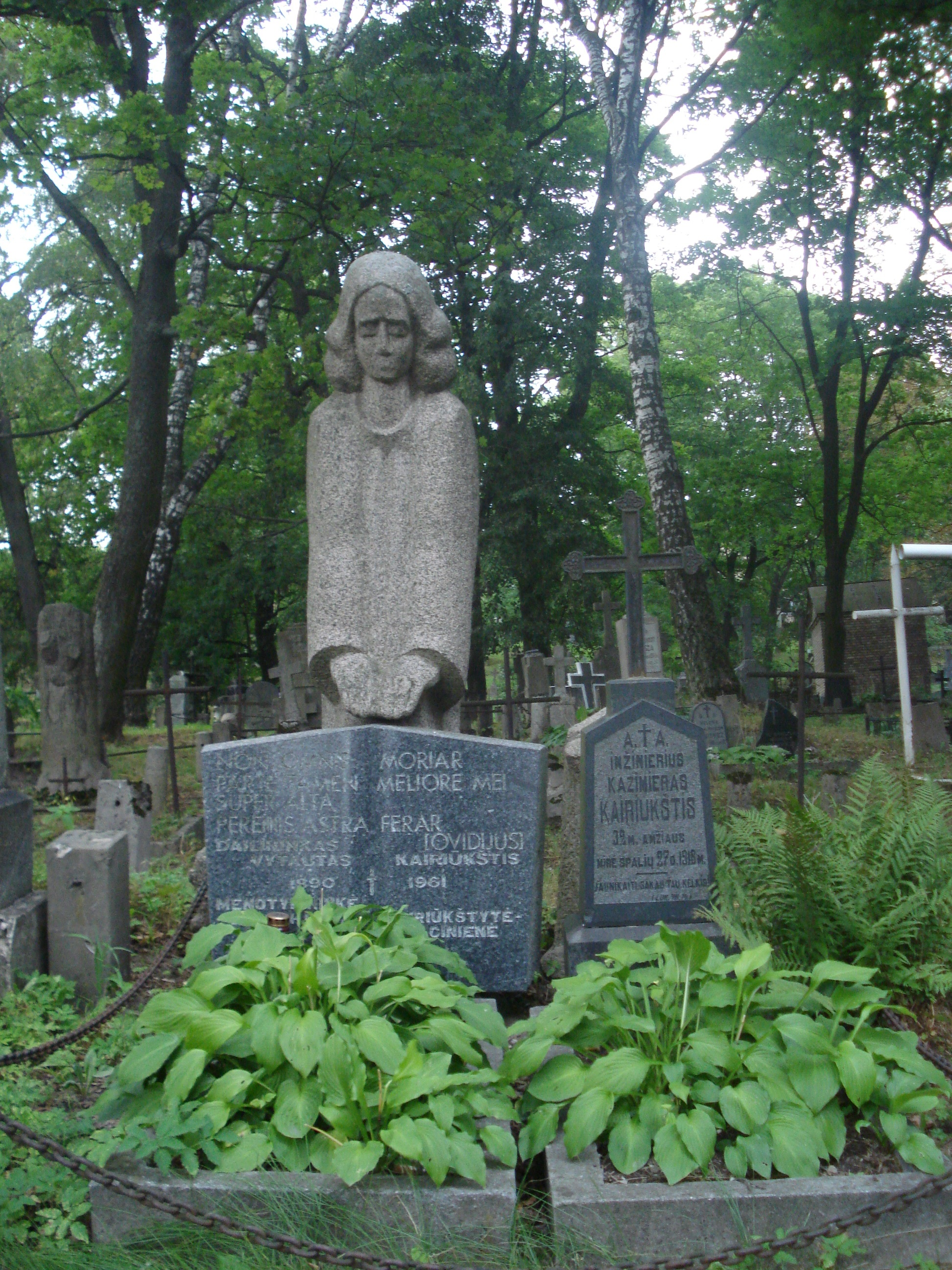
Gravestone in Bernardine Cemetery, Vilnius

Vytautas Kairiūkštis (Polish: Witold Kajruksztis, 1890 in Sejny – 1961 in Vilnius) was a Lithuanian constructivist artist.

From 1910 to 1911 Kairiukstis attended the Vilnius Drafting School.

In 1923 Kairiūkštis organised the New Art Exhibition which lasted from May 20 to June 20. In this he was aided by Władysław Strzemiński, who had moved to Vilnius the year before. This was the first avant-garde art exhibition in Lithuania and featured Cubist, Constructivist, and Suprematist works.
