= Władysław Strzemiński =

Polish avant-garde painter (1893–1952)

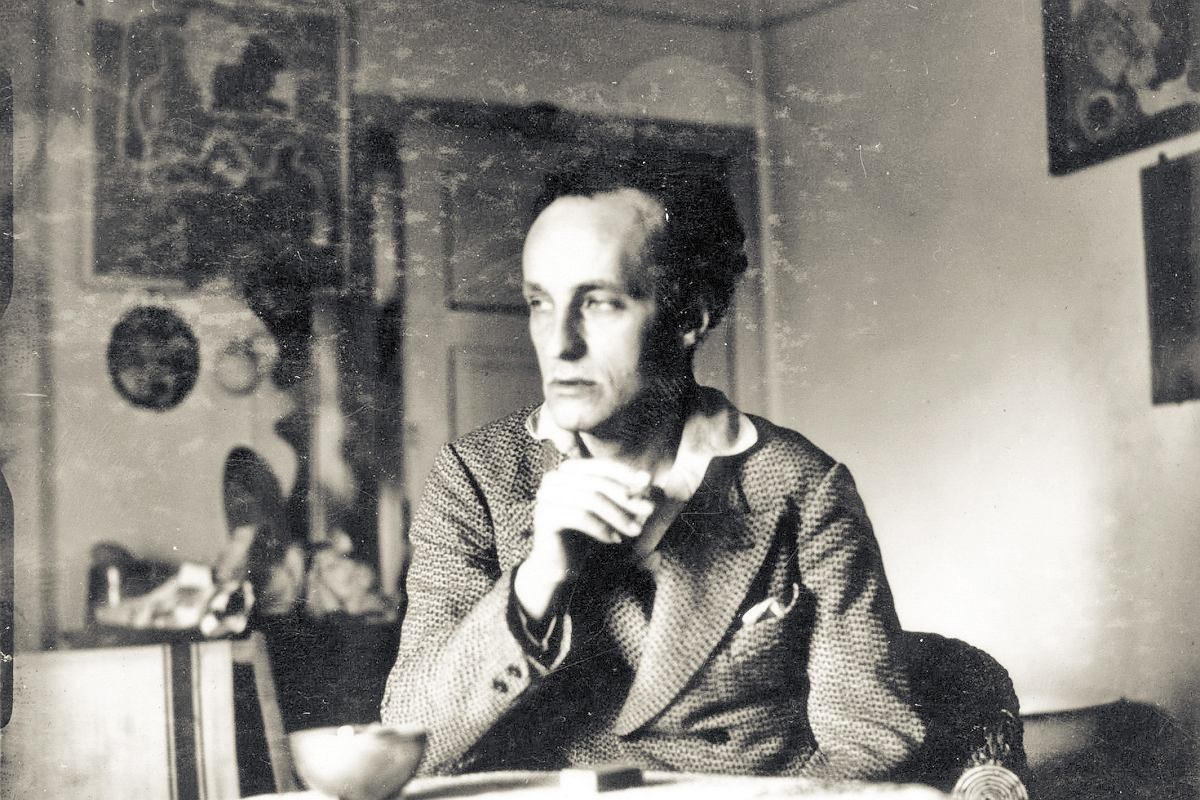
- Strzemiński in 1932
- Born: 21 November 1893; Minsk, Russian Empire
- Died: 29 December 1952 (aged 59); Łódź, Poland
- Resting place: Old Cemetery, Łódź, Poland
- Known for: Painting, drawing, teaching
- Movement: Constructivism
- Spouse: Katarzyna Kobro (m. 1920, divorced)

Władysław Strzemiński (Polish pronunciation: [vwaˈdɨswaf ʂt͡ʂɛˈmiɲskʲi]; Russian: Владислав Максимилианович Стржеминский, romanized: Vladislav Maksimilianovich Strzheminsky; 21 November 1893 – 26 December 1952) was a Polish painter, art theoretician, pedagogue, and soldier. He is regarded as a pioneer of Constructivist avant-garde of the 1920s and 1930s and the developer of the theory of unism (Polish: unizm).

== Life and work ==
Strzemiński was born in Minsk to Maksymilian Strzemiński and Ewa Rozalia Olechnowicz, both of whom were ethnically Polish and cultivated Polish traditions. His father was a lieutenant colonel in the Imperial Russian Army, who hoped for a military career for his son.

In 1914, Władysław Strzemiński graduated from the Military School of Civil Engineering in Saint Petersburg. During World War I, he served as second lieutenant at the Osowiec Fortress. In 1915, he was severely wounded and crippled in the Attack of the Dead Men, where he became the commander after the death of Vladimir Kotlinsky and for which he received the Order of St. George. The injuries were so acute that portions of Strzemiński's right leg and left arm were amputated, and he partially lost sight in one of his eyes. In 1920, he married painter Katarzyna Kobro.

In 1922, he moved to Wilno (now Vilnius), and in the following year supported Vytautas Kairiūkštis in creating the first avant-garde art exhibition in what is now the territory of Lithuania (then part of Poland, under Polish rule).

In November 1923, he moved to Warsaw, where with Henryk Berlewi he founded the constructivist group Blok.

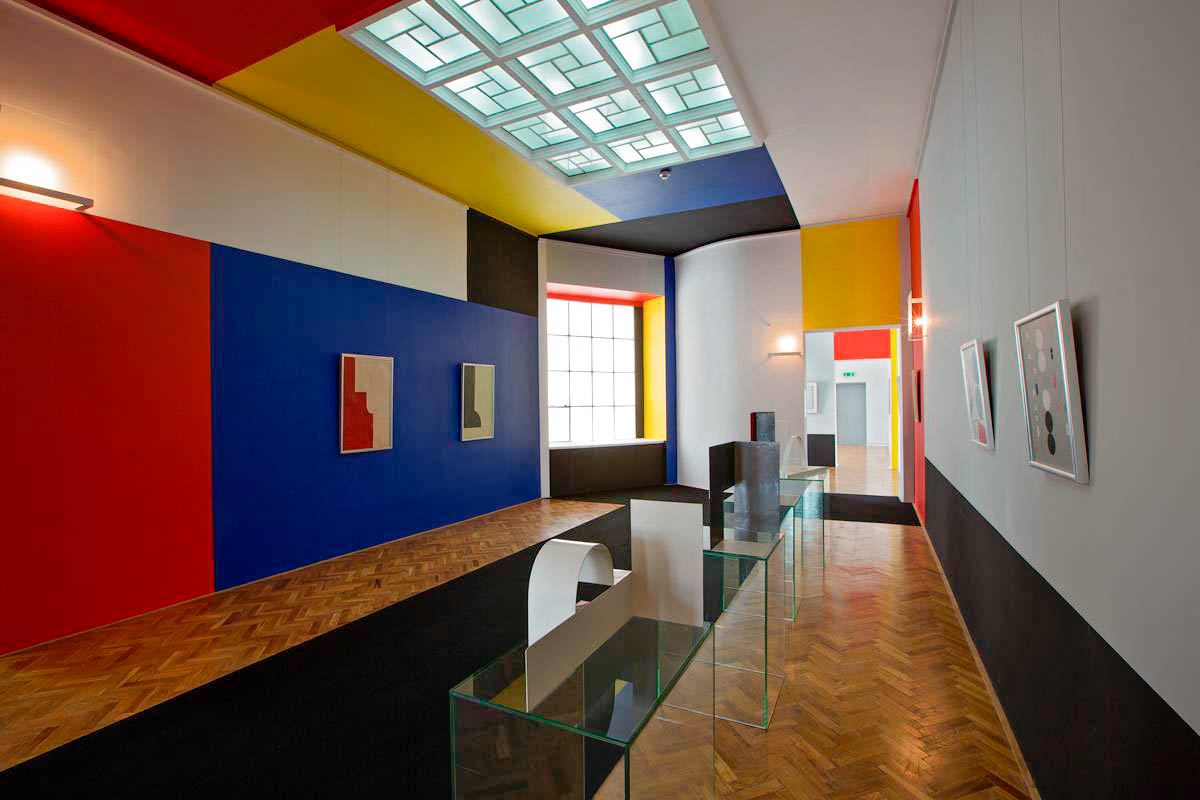
Neoplastic Room as reconstructed in 1960 by Bolesław Utkin, one of Strzemiński's students.

During the 1920s, he formulated his theory of Unism (Unizm in Polish). His paintings influenced the musical compositions of Polish composers Zygmunt Krauze, the creator of unistic music, and Marcin Stańczyk, the inventor of Aftersounds (inspired by Strzemiński’s Afterimages). He is an author of a revolutionary book titled "The theory of vision". He was co creator of unique avant-garde art collection in Łódź gathered together thanks to the enthusiasm of members of the "a.r." group as Katarzyna Kobro and Henryk Stażewski (the artists) and Julian Przyboś and Jan Brzękowski (the poets).

In postwar Łódź, Strzemiński was an instructor at the Higher School of Plastic Arts and Design Neoplastic Room at the Museum of Art, Łódź, where one of his students was Halina Ołomucka, survivor of the Nazi concentration camps. His Neoplastic Room was installed in the museum in 1948 but was removed in 1950 as it failed to fit in with the socialist realist aesthetic imposed by Włodzimierz Sokorski, the minister of culture of the Polish United Workers' Party.

His works have been exhibited in such museums around the world as Centre Pompidou, Museo Reina Sofia, Moderna Museet Malmö and Whitechapel Gallery.

== In film ==
He is the subject of Afterimage (2016), the final film by Andrzej Wajda.

== Selected paintings ==
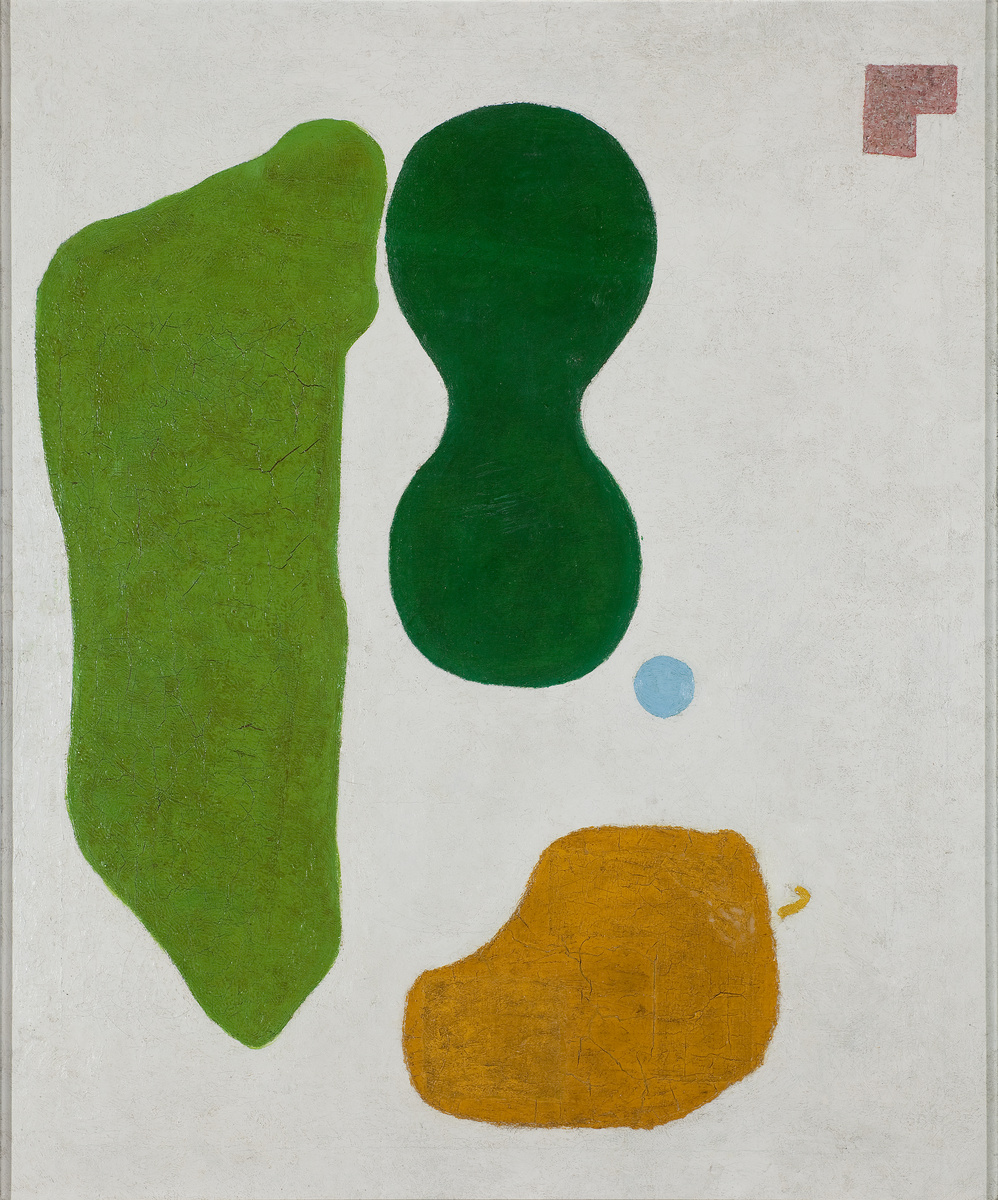
Synthetic composition I (1923)

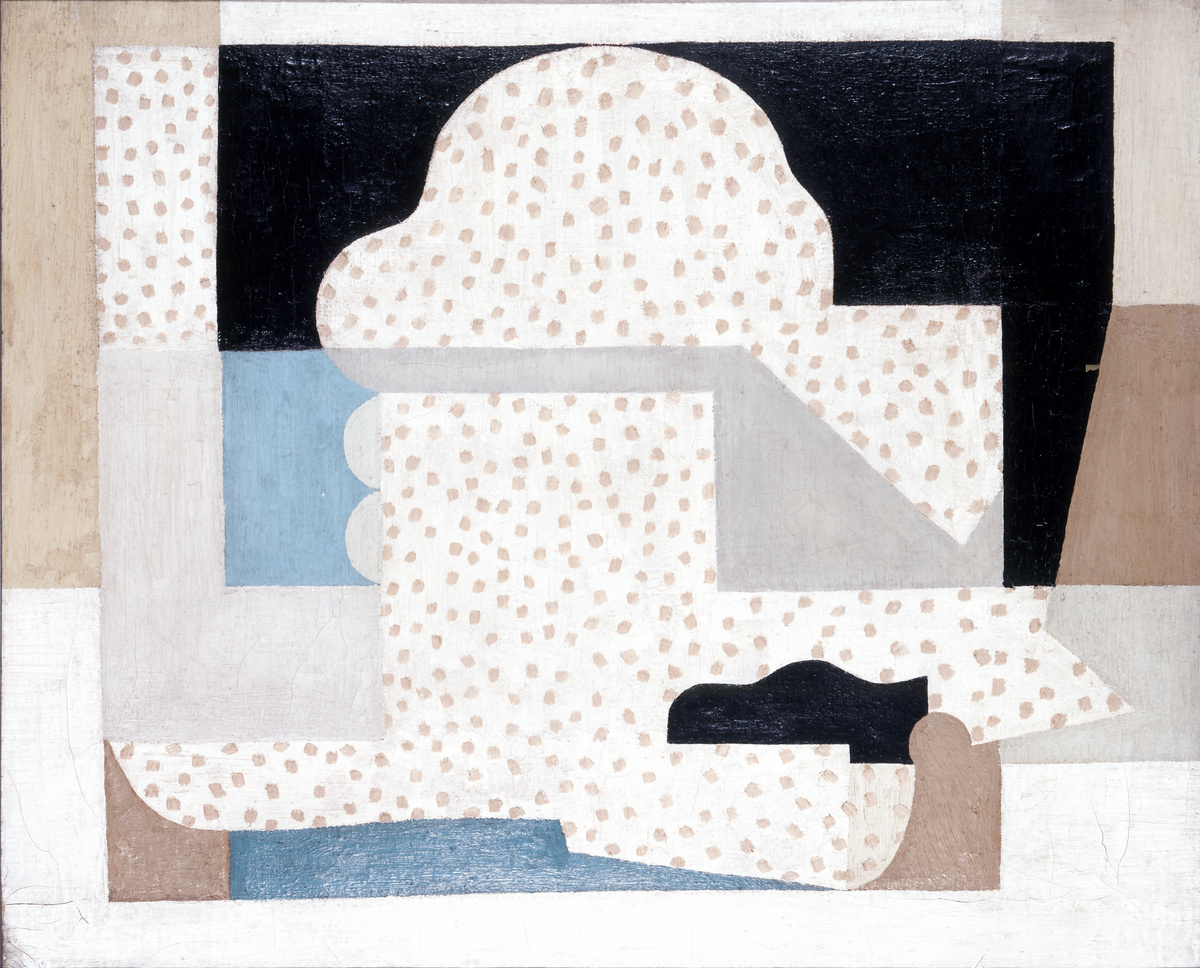
Still life 3 (1923)

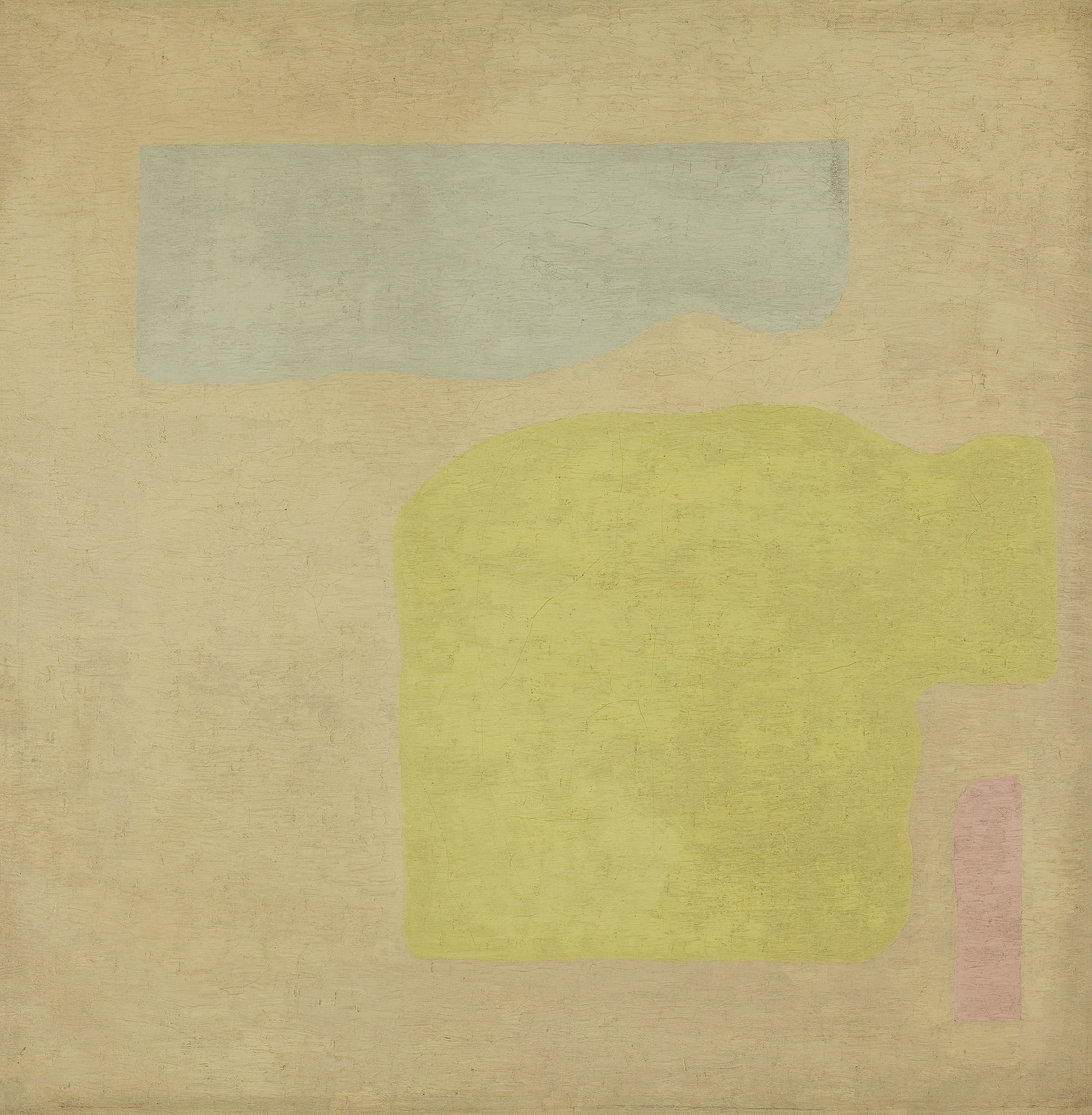
Unitist composition 4 (1925)

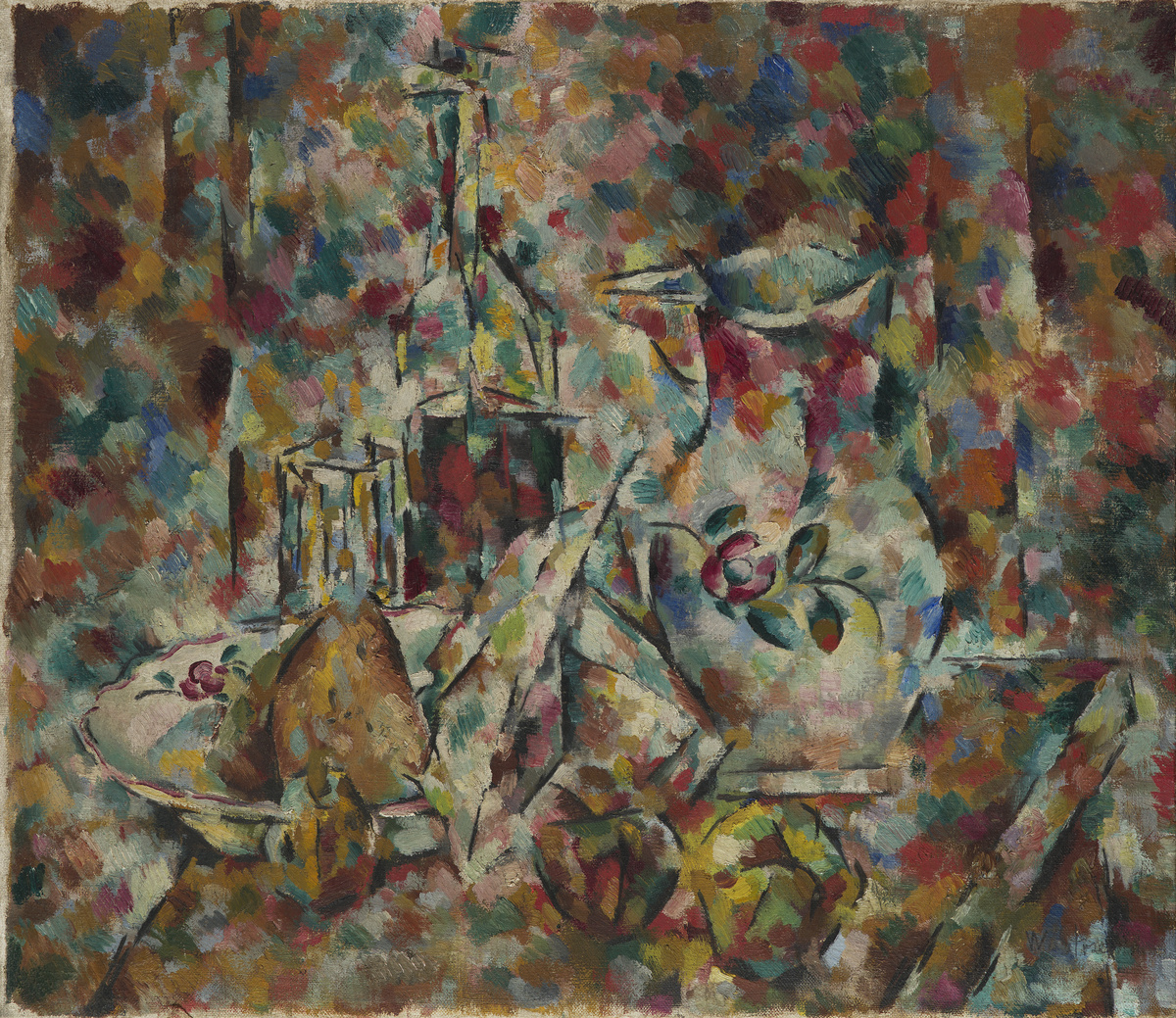
Still life (1926)

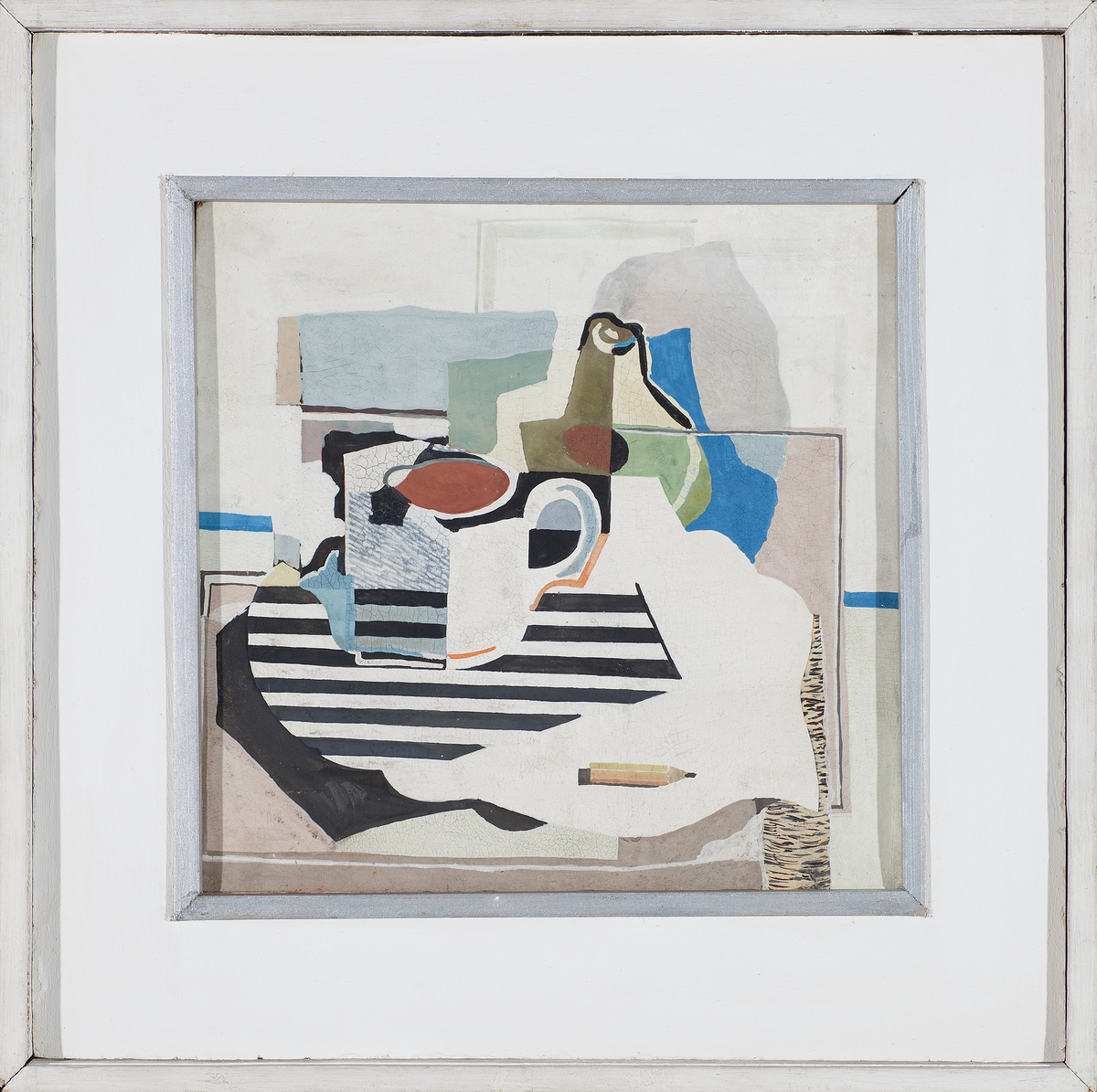
Still life (1926)

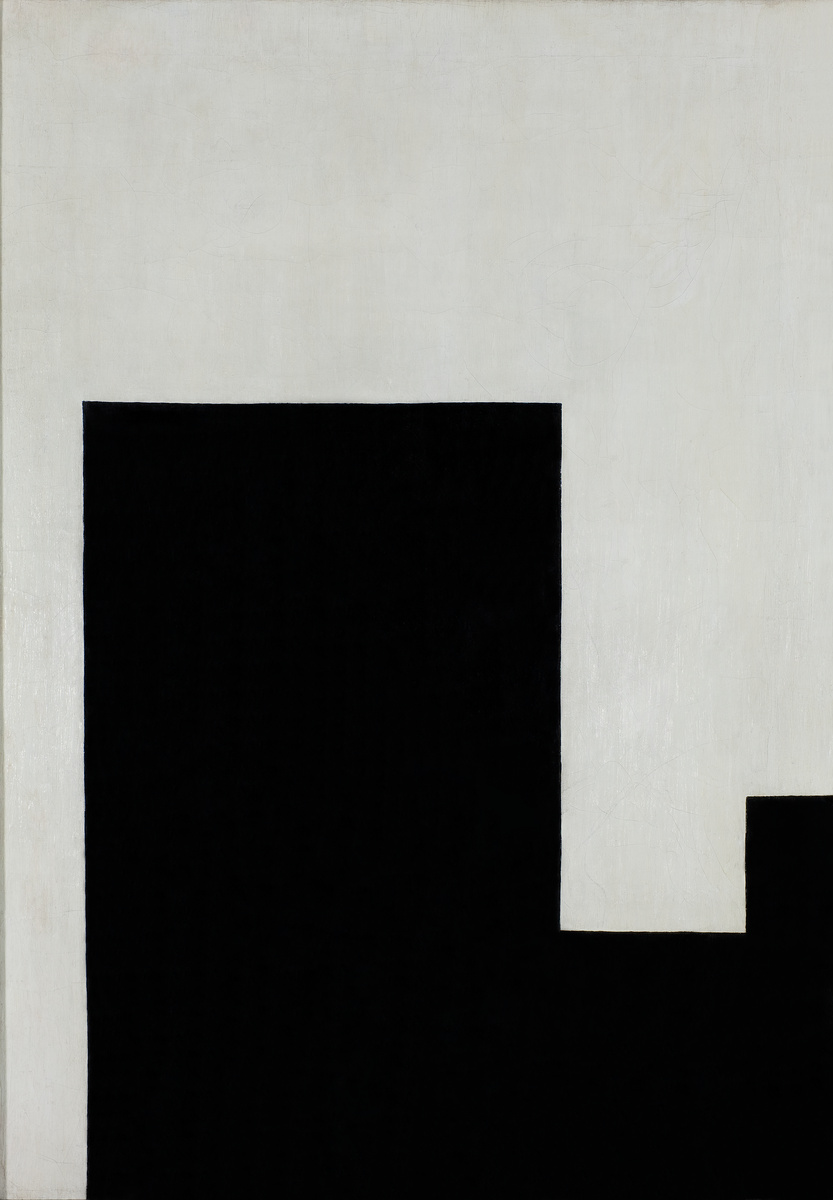
Architectural composition I (1926)

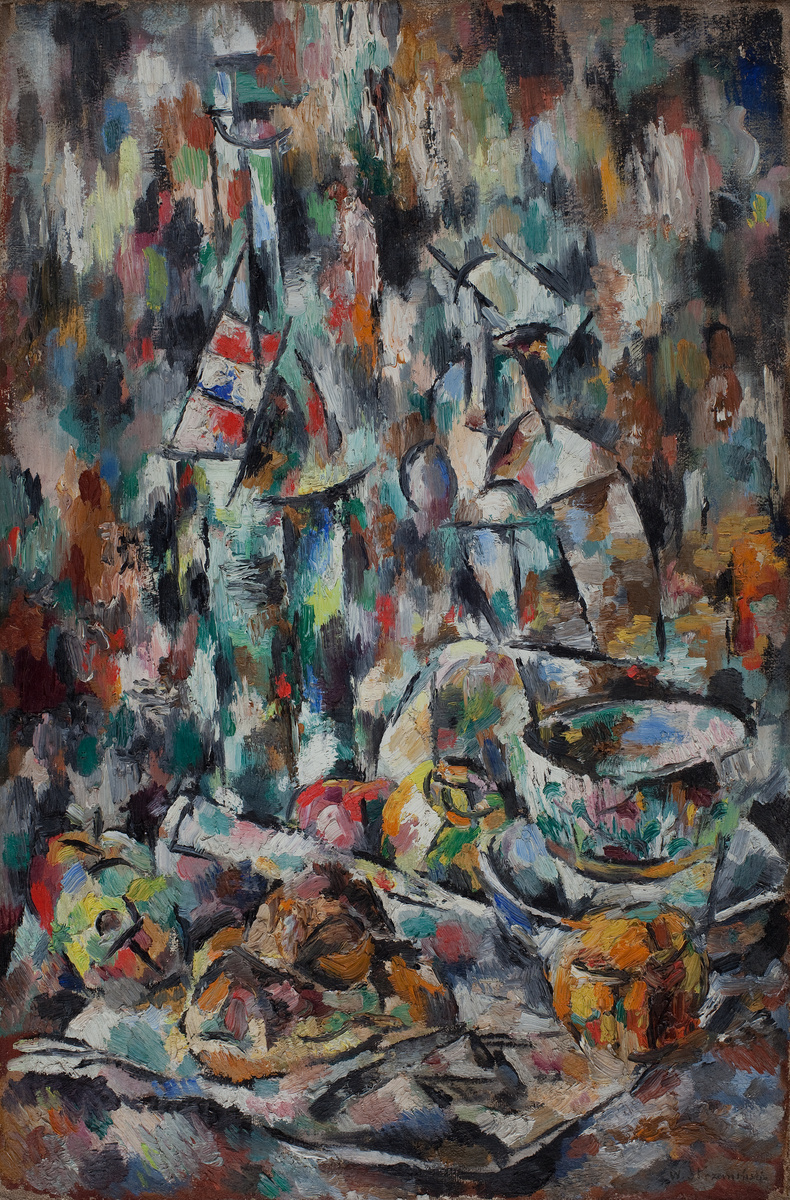
Still life IV (1926/1927)

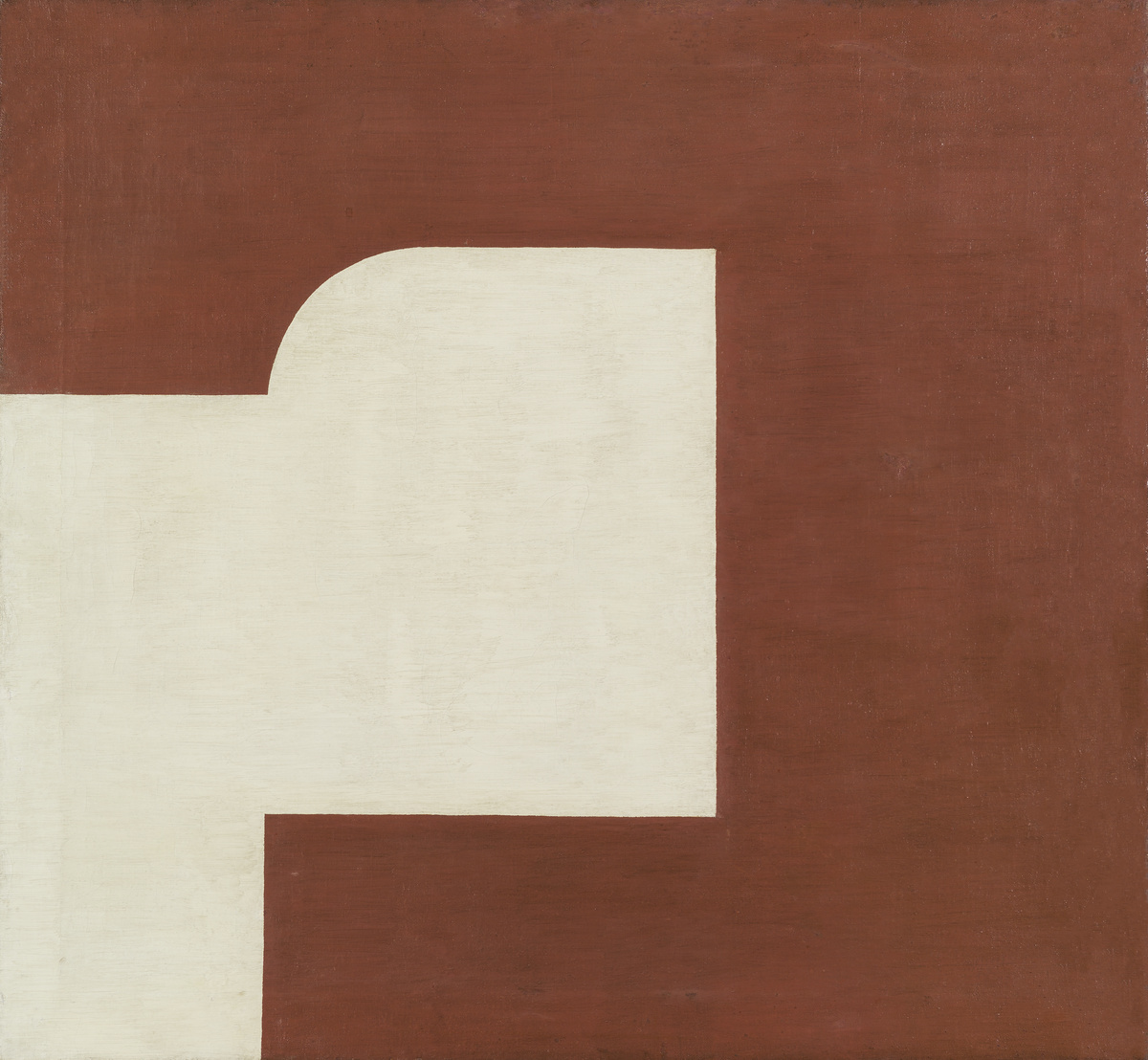
Architetural composition IVa (1927)

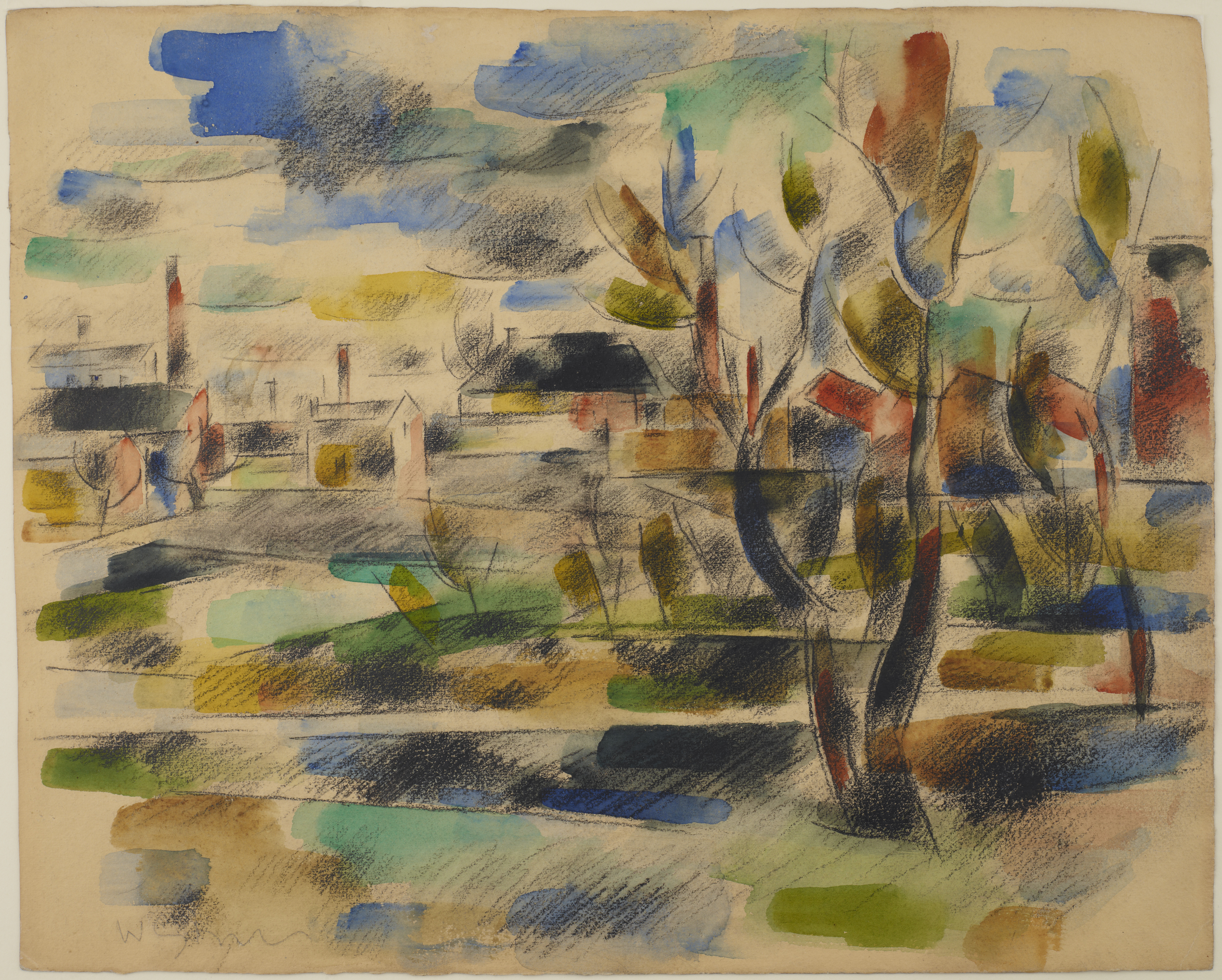
Landscape of Łódź Seen From Retkinia (1941)

== Bibliography ==
- Władysław Strzemiński. Readability of Images. Proceedings of the international conference devoted to the work of Władysław Strzemiński, 13–14 October 2011, Muzeum Sztuki, Łódź 2015.
- Władysław Strzemiński 1893–1952. On the 100th Anniversary of His Birth, Muzeum Sztuki w Łodzi, Łódź 1993.
