= Mieczysław Szczuka =

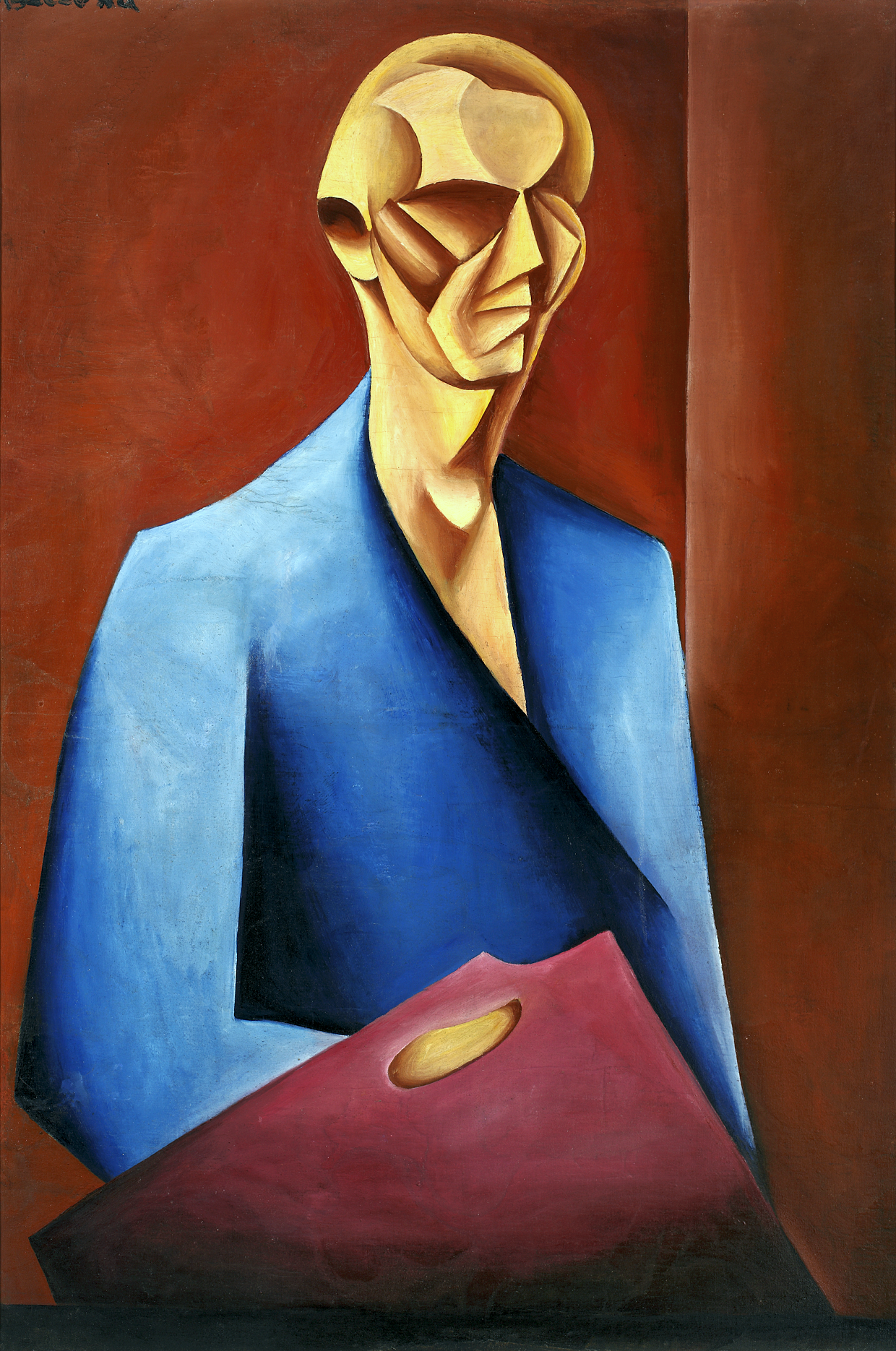
- Self-portrait (1920)
- Born: 19 October 1898; Warsaw, Kingdom of Poland
- Died: 13 August 1927 (aged 28); Tatra Mountains, Poland

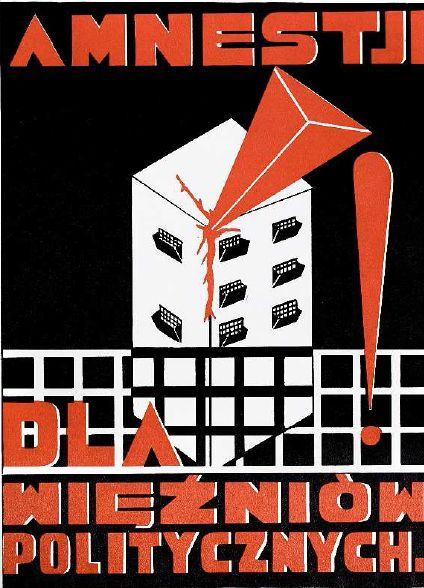
Amnesty for political prisoners Poster by Mieczysław Szczuka (1926)

Mieczysław Szczuka (19 October 1898 – 13 August 1927) was a Polish avant-garde artist and mountaineer.

Count Szczuka was born in Warsaw, Kingdom of Poland, Russian Empire (now Poland) and studied painting in 1915–1918 at the Academy of Fine Arts in Warsaw, with Professor Miłosz Kotarbiński. After graduation, he worked as painter and graphic artist. His main work was as a book illustrator and a theatre set designer. He also produced photomontages and abstract art films. Szczuka participated in several international exhibitions such as the "First exhibition of modern art" in Bucharest. A promoter of utilitarianism in Poland, Szczuka joined the group of avantgarde artists "Blok".

Diagnosed with tuberculosis, in 1923 Mieczysław Szczuka moved to the mountain resort of Zakopane at the foot of Tatras. He started mountaineering and in 1923-1927 repeated some most difficult climbs of the time and established own new routes.

He died in an accident while climbing the south face of Zamarła Turnia in the Tatra Mountains with a novice climber.
