= Henryk Stażewski =

Polish painter (1894–1988)

- Stażewski at his Warsaw studio during the 1980s
- Born: 9 January 1894; Warsaw, Kingdom of Poland
- Died: 10 June 1988 (aged 94); Warsaw, Polish People's Republic
- Education: Warsaw Academy of Fine Arts
- Style: geometric abstraction
- Movement: Polish Constructivism, Blok, Praesens, a.r. group
- Awards: Gold Cross of Merit (1955); Herder Prize (1972)

Henryk Stażewski (pronounced: /stəʒɛfskiː/ STa-zhef-skee; 9 January 1894 – 10 June 1988) was a Polish painter, visual artist and writer. Stażewski has been described as the "father of the Polish avant-garde" and is considered a pivotal figure in the history of constructivism and geometric abstraction in Central and Eastern Europe. His career spanned seven decades and he was one of the few prominent Polish artists of the interwar period who remained active and gained further international recognition in the second half of the 20th century.

Stażewski rose to prominence as a co-founder of Blok, Praesens, and a.r. group, three interwar artist collectives which spearheaded the development of Polish Constructivist art. During the 1920s and 1930s, he became acquainted with and influenced by prominent European avant-garde artists, including the Soviet Suprematist painters Kazimir Malevich and El Lissitzky, the Dutch de Stijl artists Theo van Doesburg and Piet Mondrian, as well as the French Cubist painter and later founder of the Abstraction-Création collective Albert Gleizes, among others. As a member of the a.r. group, Stażewski was also one of the key artists—alongside Władysław Strzemiński and Katarzyna Kobro—involved in the formation of Muzeum Sztuki in Łódź in 1931, the first museum in Europe dedicated to showcasing and collecting modern art. Stażewski's career was hindered by the outbreak of World War II and most of his work was destroyed during the Nazi occupation of Poland. After the end of the war in 1945, he returned to painting but faced the cultural constraints resulting from the imposition of Stalinism and Socialist Realism in Poland.

Following the cultural and political Thaw of 1956, Stażewski began working on abstract relief sculptures, a medium that preoccupied him in the following decades and became his most recognized body of work. First exhibited in 1959, Stażewski's reliefs deployed diverse media and embraced various non-figurative visual vocabularies inspired by his interwar investigations into geometric abstraction. During the 1960s, still working behind the Iron Curtain, Stażewski helped facilitate unofficial cultural exchanges with numerous Western artists. In 1966, he initiated a years-long collaboration with the non-commercial gallery space Galeria Foksal in Warsaw, which played a critical role in the development of the Polish post-war avant-garde. Working alongside Christian Boltanski, Tadeusz Kantor, Allan Kaprow, Edward Krasiński, Annette Messager and other contemporary artists who exhibited at Foksal throughout the 1980s, Stażewski continued to cultivate international artistic connections with the West during the late communist period in Poland.

Stażewski's works are included in permanent collections of museums in Europe and the United States. For his contributions to Central and Eastern European culture, the artist was awarded the 1972 Herder Prize.

== Early life and work ==
=== Education and early work ===
Henryk Stażewski was born in Warsaw on 9 January 1894, then part of the Kingdom of Poland, a semi-autonomous state under the political control of the Russian Empire. He was one of the four children of Leonard Rafał Stażewski, the owner of a small foundry on Wspólna Street in central Warsaw, and Michalina (née Skibicka). He enrolled at the Warsaw Academy of Fine Arts in 1913, where he studied under the prominent portraitist and illustrator Stanisław Lentz. A surviving series of figurative watercolor paintings from 1915—including nudes, portraits, and landscapes—reveals the influence of Impressionist art in Stażewski's early work.

Stażewski graduated from the academy in 1919, a year after Poland had regained its independence. In 1921, he participated in Wystawa Formistów (The Formist Exhibition) at the Society for the Encouragement of Fine Arts in Warsaw. A Polish avant-garde artistic and literary group that drew on Cubism, Futurism, and Expressionism, the Formists opposed naturalism in painting and sought to incorporate influences from other Western avant-garde movements. Later in 1921, Stażewski showed his work—together with several early compositions by a fellow Polish painter Mieczysław Szczuka—at the Polish Artists' Club in Warsaw. In 1922, Stażewski was included in the Trzecia Wystawa Grupy Formistów F9 (The Third Formist Exhibition F9) in Warsaw and a year later, in the Exhibition of New Art in Vilnius and the International Exhibition of New Art in Łódź.

=== Polish Constructivism (1924–1930s) ===
The front page of Blok (Issue 1, 8 March 1924) designed by Stażewski, which also included some of his early writing on abstraction

The Vilnius exhibition in 1923, which included works by avant-garde artists from across Eastern Europe and Russia, is credited with introducing constructivist tendencies to Polish art. Among the participating artists who would have a significant impact on Stażewski's approach to artistic production was Władysław Strzemiński, who had previously studied at two Constructivist collectives, INKhUK and Vkhutemas, in Moscow. (Note: While he had never visited Russia, Stażewski was familiar with several key artists associated with the Russian avant-garde during the 1920s, including El Lissitzky, who had briefly stayed in Poland en route to Berlin in 1921. Lodder (2018), pp. 25–37) While in Moscow, Strzemiński investigated various ways in which art could be harnessed to construct a new, socialist society in the aftermath of the Great War (later known as World War I), recognizing the role of an artist as that of an engineer as well as a scientist aiding in the process of social transformation.

For Stażewski, the connection between art and science was crucial, and he argued that "a painting's systematic quality connected it to contemporary civilization in a unilateral action—from science and machines to works of art". Through analyzing the constituent parts of their painting—that is, "space, faktura, line, and color"—the Constructivist artists were not completely beholden to the notions of intuition or talent, imbuing the process of art making with a sense of objectivity and collective labor.

==== Blok Group of Cubists, Constructivists, and Suprematists (1924–1926) ====
In 1924, following the Vilnius exhibition, Stażewski, working with Strzemiński and Strzemiński's wife Katarzyna Kobro among other artists, co-founded Blok, or the Blok Group of Cubists, Constructivists, and Suprematists (Grupa Kubistow, Konstruktywistow i Suprematystow Blok). Active until 1926, Blok became the first Polish Constructivist collective focused on gathering like-minded artists, designers, architects, and theorists to help improve the lives of ordinary citizens. Inspired by leftist politics, Polish Constructivists associated with Blok had sought to use abstraction—applied to functional architecture, furniture design, typography or graphic design—as a radical tool to foster social and political transformation, thus bringing art into the service of the people. In a text from 1924, Stażewski emphasized the important role that abstraction plays in constructing a modern society:

Abstract art is not something detached from the external world surrounding us; and yet it ceases to be descriptive and operates by purely artistic means (...) The only purpose of the new abstract fine arts is to express the laws governing things and existence.

— Henryk Stażewski, Concerning Abstract Art, Blok nos. 8–9, 1924

At Blok, Stażewski collaborated with Henryk Berlewi and Szczuka who were considered leading figures in Polish avant-garde typography. After Blok was dissolved in 1926 due to internal disagreements, Stażewski became one of the co-founders of the avant-garde collectives Praesens (1926–1929) and later a.r. group (1929–1936), both of which also became critical in defining the direction of Constructivism in Poland. As a member of these groups, Stażewski contributed to Polish Constructivism through typography, posters, theoretical writings (including publications for the Blok magazine published between 1923 and 1926), as well as interior design and furniture design. Though predominantly idealistic and of limited impact on the Polish post-World War I society, the Constructivists completed some important architectural projects (Praesens, for instance, participated in the design of apartment buildings for the Warsaw Housing Cooperative in the Rakowiec district) and imbued the Polish avant-garde, up until then largely autonomous, with a sense of social commitment.

==== Kazimir Malevich's exhibition in Warsaw (1927) ====
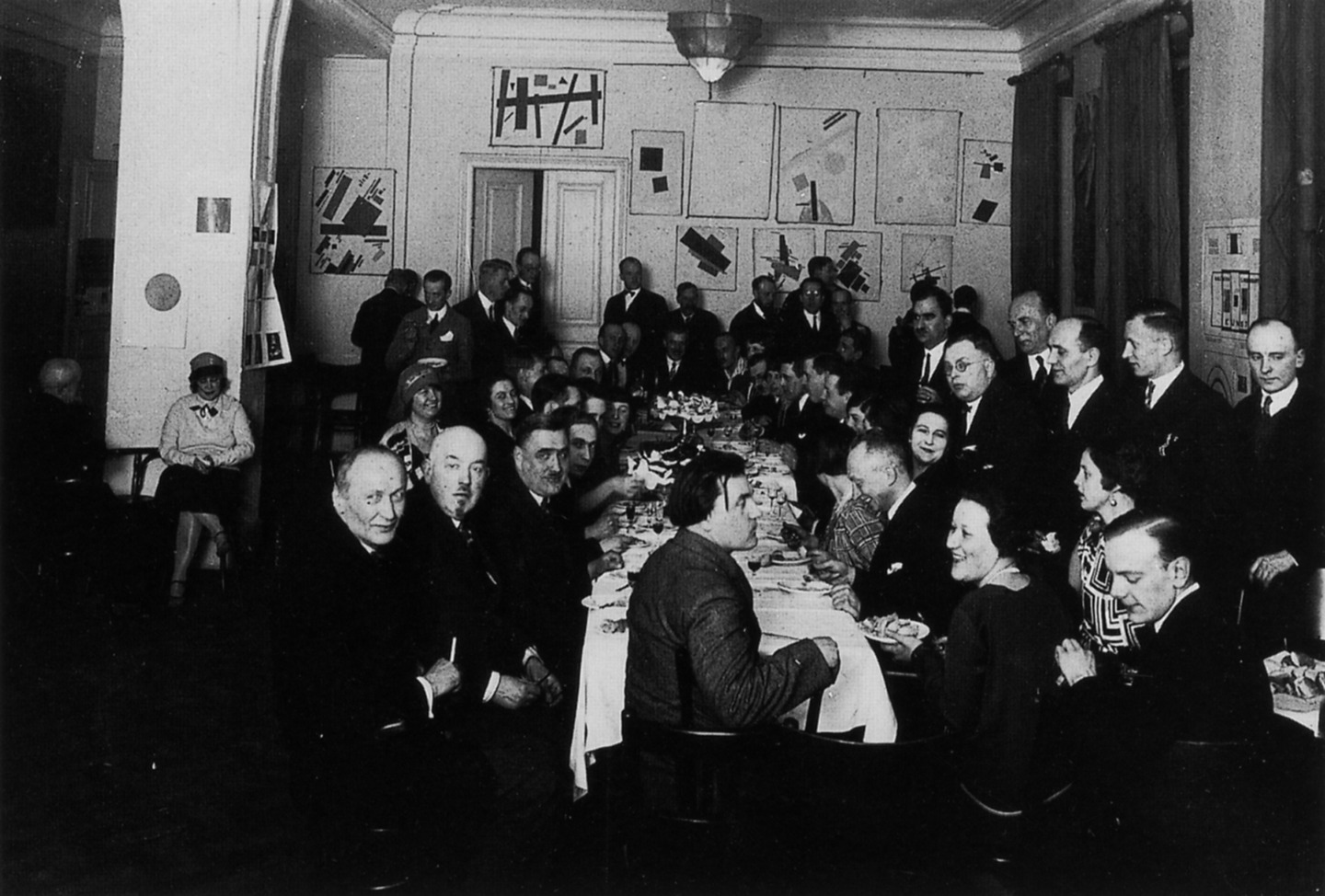
Banquet celebrating Kazimir Malevich's solo exhibition at the Hotel Polonia in Warsaw, 1927. Henryk Stażewski is standing to the far right.

In March 1927, Stażewski was among several Polish artists hosting the Russian Suprematist painter Kazimir Malevich during his trip to Warsaw. A pioneer of abstraction, Malevich coined the term Suprematism to promote the supremacy of "non-objective art of 'pure feeling', unconcerned with representation of the visible world". Malevich's theories of painting had served as a crucial point of reference for Russian Constructivists and avant-garde artists across Central and Eastern Europe. Stażewski helped organize Malevich's exhibition at Hotel Polonia and invited the artist to visit his studio.

In Warsaw, Malevich faced criticism from some contemporary artists, including Mieczysław Szczuka, who argued that Suprematism, as understood by Malevich, was no longer relevant for Polish utilitarianism-oriented avant-garde and that the artist was "a Romantic who loves painterly means for their own sake". Nonetheless, Malevich is said to have made a lasting impact on Stażewski in particular, who examined some of the key ideas of the movement regarding the autonomy of art and the superiority of non-objective visual forms in relation to his own artistic practice during the late 1920s and the early 1930s. In 1962, Stażewski would paint a reproduction of Malevich's Suprematist Composition: Airplane Flying from 1915. Malevich's 1915 work was among the paintings he had exhibited at Hotel Polonia in Warsaw in 1927 and was subsequently acquired by The Museum of Modern Art in New York.

=== Relationships with European avant-gardes ===
Kompozycja (Composition), oil on canvas (c. 1929–1930), Muzeum Sztuki

Kompozycja fakturowa (Textural Composition), 1930, lithograph (after a 1930 painting of the same title), Muzeum Sztuki

According to literary scholar Michał Wenderski, Stażewski "played an invaluable part by functioning as a sui generis liaison between Polish artists and the West" in the interwar period. While working with Constructivist groups in Poland during the 1920s, Stażewski traveled frequently and participated in several international exhibitions, including the 1926 Paris Exhibition of Theatrical Art and the New York Machine Age Exposition in 1927. He also developed and cultivated relationships with representatives of Western European avant-garde groups, including Theo van Doesburg and Piet Mondrian of the Dutch De Stijl movement, as well as the French painter Albert Gleizes. The influence of De Stijl can be found in Stażewski's work from around that time, including oil paintings titled Kompozycja (c. 1929–1930) and Kompozycja fakturowa (Textural Composition) from 1931, which rely on interlocking vertical and horizontal shapes to form a geometrical grid.

In 1929, Stażewski became a member of the Cercle et Carré and in 1931 joined Abstraction-Création, two Paris-based groups gathering international abstract painters. Also in 1931, as member of the a.r. group, Stażewski co-organized the International Collection of Modern Art in Muzeum Sztuki in Łódź. Spearheaded by Strzemiński, the collection opened on 15 February 1931 with works by key modern artists from across Europe, including Fernand Léger, Max Ernst, Hans Arp and Kurt Schwitters.

By the second half of the 1930s, Stażewski returned to representational art while still exhibiting abstract paintings and graphic design in Poland and other European countries. He also supported himself financially through portrait commissions. During Hitler's invasion of Poland in early September 1939, the building which housed Stażewski's studio in Warsaw was bombed, destroying most of his work. Stażewski remained in Poland and lived under Nazi occupation, first in Szczekociny (1943) and later in Radość (1945), having mostly abandoned artistic production during that period, except for several caricatures and landscapes, virtually none of which have survived till this day.

== Post-war career ==
=== Stalinist Poland (1948–1956) ===
Ucieczka (Escape), 1947, after the end of World War II, Stażewski experimented with various modernist styles, including semi-figurative compositions inspired by Surrealism (Starak Family Foundation)

In 1945, shortly after the war ended, Stażewski moved to Warsaw and was hired as the head of the art studio at the Military Geographical Institute. He took an apartment on Piękna Street with the artists Jan Rogoyski and Maria Ewa Łunkiewicz-Rogoyska, a space that would become a nexus of Warsaw avant-garde artists and intellectuals in the following years. During the early post-war era, he returned to painting and experimented with various modernist styles, including biomorphic abstraction—which evokes forms and shapes found in nature—and semi-figurative compositions inspired by Surrealism (evident, for instance, in the 1947 painting titled Escape).

In 1947, as a result of rigged legislative elections, the hardline Stalinist Bolesław Bierut became President of Poland. Following the Unification Congress of the Polish Workers' Party and Polish Socialist Party in December 1948, Poland was turned into a satellite state of the Soviet Union. Earlier that year, Stażewski had co-designed decorative glass panels for the large-scale Wystawa Ziem Odzyskanych (Exhibition of Recovered Territories)—a sweeping display celebrating the Polish post-war annexation of parts of Germany—which had become a centerpiece of the early Stalinist propaganda and was held in the city of Wrocław between July and October 1948. Although fired from his position at the Institute in 1949, Stażewski was able to carefully navigate the new socio-political system, avoiding the fate of his fellow avant-garde collaborators, Strzemiński and Kobro, who had been accused of reactionary cultural activities and whose careers had been effectively destroyed by the emergent Stalinist regime.

Soon, Stażewski turned to Socialist Realism—a Soviet figurative art doctrine reliant on idealized depictions of life under socialism—that had been officially imposed by the communist regime in 1949. However, he had never fully committed to the naturalistic academicism expected of Soviet Socialist Realist artists. In 1950, Stażewski was named a member of the selection committee for the I Ogólnopolska wystawa plastyki (First Nationwide Display of Plastic Arts), the inaugural exhibition of Polish Socialist Realism organized at the National Museum in Warsaw. (Note: Between 1950 and 1952, he completed multiple figurative paintings to align himself with the demands of the state. Among Stażewski's surviving Socialist Realist works is an oil painting titled Na scalonych ziemiach (On the Recovered Territories) completed in 1950, in which a tractor driver is seen traversing the eponymous reclaimed land, and exhibited at the Second National Display of Plastic Arts at the Zachęta National Gallery of Art in 1952. Ładnowska (1994a), p. 127)

While taking on various part-time projects for the government including retouching official portraits of party members at the Central Photographic Agency, Stażewski continued to organize regular clandestine gatherings for avant-garde artists in his Warsaw apartment, and wrote (at that time unpublished) texts about abstraction. The death of Stalin in 1953 and the subsequent political Thaw of 1956 precipitated the return of modernism. While Poland had become one of the first countries among the Soviet satellite states to embrace the Thaw, the cultural shift was a gradual process. Toward the end of the Stalinist regime, Stażewski and Łunkiewicz-Rogoyska were commissioned to paint a worker-themed realistic mural at the new headquarters of state-controlled Metalexport company in Warsaw, which opened in 1954. In recognition for his artistic contributions to the Polish People's Republic, Stażewski received a Gold Cross of Merit, a medal awarded for distinguished contributions to the state, in 1955.

=== Reliefs (1956–1970s) ===
In 1955, Stażewski became a member of Klub Krzywego Koła (Crooked Circle Club) in Warsaw, an independent cultural initiative for avant-garde artists, writers, and intellectuals. In 1956, Stalin's successor Nikita Khrushchev delivered his "On the Cult of Personality and Its Consequences" speech, which disavowed Stalinism and ushered in the political thaw. That year Stażewski joined the newly opened gallery space of the Crooked Circle Club where Jerzy Nowosielski, Alina Szapocznikow, Urszula Broll, Stefan Gierowski and other contemporary painters would also exhibit their work.

Around 1956, Stażewski began exploring the relief form as his medium. (Note: Some scholars indicate the year 1957 as the beginning of Stażewski's relief works, but recent research has shown he started applying the name "relief" and explored three-dimensionality in painting as early as 1956. Warszewska-Kołodziej (2012), p. 25) Using a variety of unorthodox materials including plywood, plexiglass, cardboard, Masonite board and copper, the artist deployed non-representational forms to construct three-dimensional reliefs on a horizontal pictorial surface. Stażewski's reliefs broke away from the traditional pictorial flatness and underscored the artist's interest in the tactile qualities of used materials, forging a new theoretical space with which to articulate color. Moreover, the artist's emphasis on tactility and materiality recalls the Russian Constructivist engagement with faktura, an intention to accentuate the work's physical qualities as a way to challenge traditional illusionism in painting.

White on White No. 25, 1963 in which the artist created a monochromatic textural composition used oil paint and wood, recalling Constructivist engagement with faktura (Buffalo AKG Art Museum)

Untitled, 1966, aluminum, in 1964, Stażewski began making reliefs using copper and aluminum that highlighted the intrinsic visual properties of metal (private collection)

Relief nr. 38, 1969 illustrates Stażewski's continued reliance on simple geometric shapes to formulate the visual vocabulary of his polychromatic reliefs (private collection)

In 1959, Stażewski exhibited the reliefs for the first time during a solo show at Kordegarda Gallery in Warsaw. The exhibition space consisted of large, protruding panels designed by the Polish scenographer and architect Stanisław Zamecznik, contributing to what Stażewski called "relative movement," or an intention to increase the physical depth of the relief space to create a more immersive environment for the viewer. Well received by contemporary critics, the Kordegarda show helped to re-position Stażewski as a leading figure in the Polish contemporary art scene. According to art historian Marek Bartelik, Stażewski's commitment to abstraction in the post-war era speaks "to the persistence of the utopian belief in the transcendent power of abstraction: as a form of absolute universal expression". His inspirations during that time were manifold and art historian Andrzej Turowski notes that Stażewski "did not succumb to any stylistic categories". At the same time, scholar Christina Lodder points to the continued relevance of Russian avant-garde art, including that of Malevich, whose Suprematist Composition: Airplane Flying from 1915 Stażewski had reproduced in 1962.

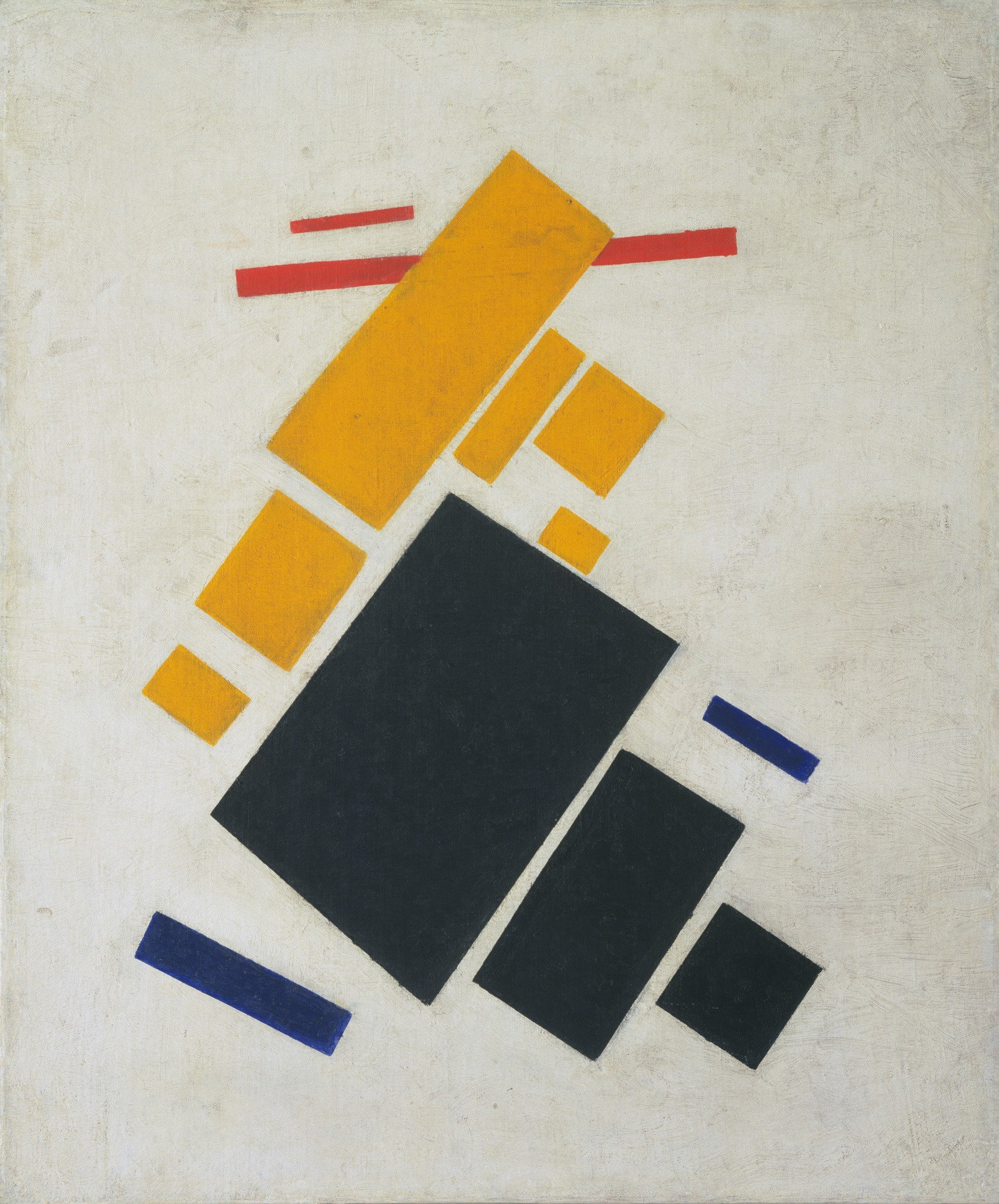
Kazimir Malevich, Suprematist Composition: Airplane Flying, oil on canvas, 1915 (Museum of Modern Art, New York) was reproduced by Henryk Stażewski in 1962.

Between 1960 and 1962, Stażewski held three exhibitions at the Crooked Circle Gallery in Warsaw. He continued to show his relief work, including a series called White Reliefs made in 1961. In August 1961, several of these were included in Fifteen Polish Painters, a major exhibition of Polish contemporary art at the Museum of Modern Art in New York, alongside works by Wojciech Fangor, Tadeusz Kantor and Jan Lebenstein, among others. Focused almost exclusively on non-representational art and organized by a major U.S. institution, the show championed abstraction as a symbolic manifestation of Poland's cultural and political freedom during the Cold War era.

Also in 1961, art dealers Madeleine Chalette-Lejwa and Arthur Lejwa, the founders of Galerie Chalette in New York, featured Stażewski's work in a group exhibition, offering him an early exposure to the American market. Examining Stażewski's writings from that period, art historian Marta Zboralska argues that the artist saw himself as an "active contributor to the enquiry into abstraction throughout the 1960s and beyond". Distancing himself from the influences of Malevich and Mondrian, Stażewski stressed in an essay written in 1968 the impact of Johannes Itten and Josef Albers, two Bauhaus artists whose engagement with color theory was influential in both Europe and the US.

By the mid-1960s, Stażewski had begun using aluminum and copper for his relief work, shunning painted material in favor of the intrinsic color properties of metal. According to art historians Maja and Reuben Fowkes, the reliefs made of metal simulate "the effect of depth by rhythmically layering shapes and optical effects on the surface, exchanging visual determinism for the randomness of reflected light". In 1964, Kazimir Karpuszko, a Polish expatriate art dealer, organized a show of Stażewski's work at Chicago's Contemporary Art Gallery, the artist's first solo exhibition in the United States and an opportunity to introduce his reliefs to the wider American public. In subsequent years, Stażewski's work was also shown at Marlborough-Gerson Gallery and Sidney Janis Gallery in New York.

In Poland, several of Stażewski's works, including a large-scale geometric metal sculpture modeled after one of his abstract reliefs, were included in the First Biennial of Spatial Forms in Elbląg in 1965. By 1968, Stażewski had returned to polychromatic relief compositions, often made with wood on Masonite board and painted over with acrylic, frequently juxtaposing simple geometrical figures in contrasting colors to achieve a sense of visually dynamic arrangement. Referring to his sustained engagement with color during a 1968 interview, the artist said: "I gradually move from cold to warm colors according to their wavelengths, from pure to grey, from light to dark, using vertical and horizontal combinations. This gives me an infinite number of variants".

=== Foksal Gallery ===
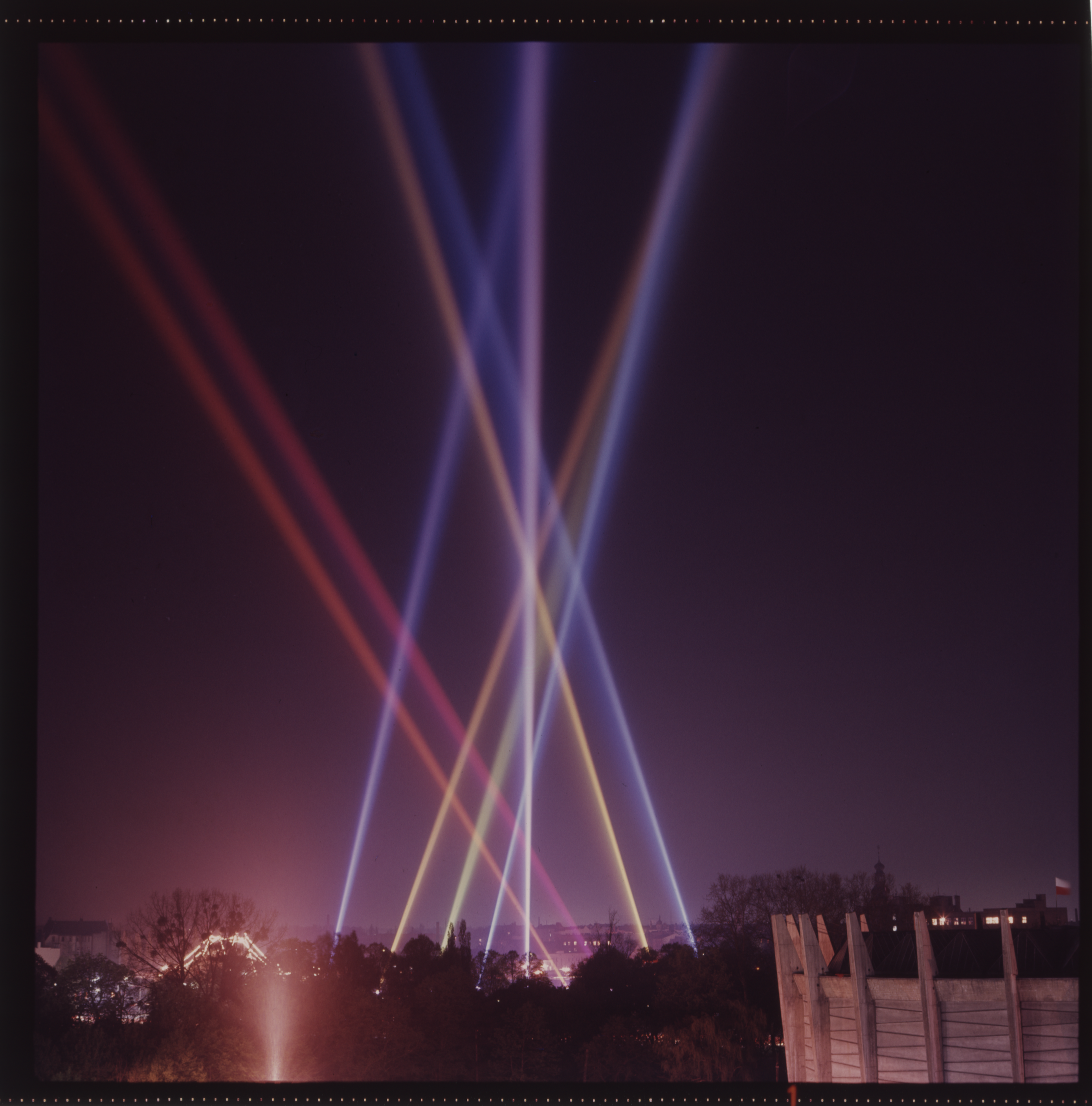
Infinite Vertical Composition, 1970. The artwork was made from color light beams projected onto the night sky during the Wrocław 70 symposium in Wrocław, Poland

Nr. 14, 1973. During the 1970s, Stażewski's work often examined the compositional properties of a straight line (private collection)

In 1966, Stażewski was one of the artists representing Poland at the XXXIII Venice Biennale, where his relief works received an honorable mention. Throughout the 1960s, Stażewski collaborated regularly with contemporary galleries in and outside of Poland. Key among them was his long-standing collaboration with Foksal Gallery, which he co-founded in 1966, a non-commercial art space in Warsaw that would play a key role in the development of Polish post-war avant-garde. Unlike traditional exhibition venues, Foksal revolved around robust collaboration between participating artists and was supposed to present displays that "problematized the artistic process itself" while keeping an "apparent distance from governmental endeavors to instrumentalize art", even though the gallery was publicly funded.

Participating in the artistic program of Foksal provided Stażewski with an opportunity to exhibit his work in a more experimental space. He also continued to facilitate connections with international artists. Throughout the 1970s, he worked alongside Włodzimierz Borowski, Tadeusz Kantor, the American happening artist Allan Kaprow (exhibited at Foksal in 1976), the French conceptual and installation artists Christian Boltanski (1978) and Annette Messager (1978), and the American conceptualist Lawrence Weiner (1979), among others.

Outside of Foksal, he collaborated with the French conceptual artist and art theorist Daniel Buren, who re-designed the exhibition space of the Paris-based Galerie 16 in 1974 for Stażewski's show. Stażewski and Buren would later work together on a project at Galerie 1–36, an experimental space active in Paris from 1972 to 1976. He also developed a close artistic relationship with Edward Krasiński. He and Krasiński shared an apartment at Aleja Solidarności in Warsaw from 1970 until Stażewski's death in 1988. The space, which had served as a salon for Polish artists and intellectuals during the last three decades of communist rule in Poland, was later renamed the Instytut Awangardy (Avant-garde Institute) and opened to the public in 2007.

=== Late career (1970s–1988) ===
Stażewski experimented with color and geometry in diverse visual and aesthetic registers throughout his career. In 1970, he participated in the art symposium Wrocław 70 where he showcased Infinite Vertical Composition (9 Rays of Light in the Sky), an artwork made of colorful beams of light projected onto the night sky that released color from its previous pictorial confines. In 1972, the Dallas Museum of Art included Stażewski in Geometric Abstraction, 1916–1942, a survey show of geometric abstract art in the first four decades of the 20th century. That year, he was also awarded the Herder Prize for his contributions to the visual culture of Central and Eastern Europe. In 1976, he was featured in Constructivism in Poland, 1923–1936: Blok, Praesens, a.r., an exhibition devoted to the history of Polish Constructivism organized at the Museum of Modern Art in New York, which traveled the same year to the Detroit Institute of Arts, the Albright-Knox Gallery in Buffalo, and the Art Institute of Chicago.

In the 1970s, Stażewski explored the visual properties of line. His paintings and drawings from that period show an investigation into the possibilities afforded by line, including the monochromatic grid. Geometry remained a critical reference point for the artist and he considered it an "innate measure in the eye of every man, allowing him to grasp relations and proportions". Over the next decade, Stażewski also continued to revitalize some of the visual forms present in his early tactile reliefs by moving back them onto a flat painterly surface. While his later compositions had become more intuitive, standing in contrast to the more scientifically determined compositional methods, the artist remained committed to examining the pictorial properties of color. Scholar Janina Ładnowska described Stażewski's planes of color as "flat, strong, homogeneous, clean, sometimes shining" and suggested that these polychromatic compositions made late in the artist's career cast doubt on the "rational" structures of his earlier work.

During the late 1970s, Stażewski also became interested in creating environments, reimagining his paintings in three-dimensional spaces, informed by his interest in psychology. He continued to exhibit internationally throughout the 1980s, participating in solo and group shows at Staatliche Kunstsammlungen in Dresden, Monumentum Fine Arts in Minneapolis, as well as Centre Pompidou and Galerie Denise René in Paris. In 1980, Stażewski proposed a cultural exchange between Poland and the United States, inviting contemporary American artists to donate their works to the Muzeum Sztuki in Łódź and offering a collection of works from Polish artists to the Museum of Contemporary Art, Los Angeles. The project, coordinated by the Polish artist Anna Ptaszkowska, resulted in an exhibition titled "Une expérience muséographique d'échange entre artistes Pologne-USA: 1931–1982", organized in collaboration with the Museum of Contemporary Art, Los Angeles at Musée d'Art Moderne de la Ville de Paris in June 1982.

Stażewski died in Warsaw on 10 June 1988, aged 94. His funeral was held on 17 June and he is interred at the Powązki Military Cemetery in Warsaw.

== Legacy ==
Owing to his multifaceted practice and a long-standing career, Stażewski has had an important influence on the history of Polish and European modern and contemporary art. He has been described as "the father of the Polish avant-garde", "one of the classic figures in the history of Eastern European Constructivism", an artist who "pioneered the classical avant-garde in the 1920s and 1930s", and "one of the most important" Polish artists to link the pre and post-war "Avant-garde tendencies". Stażewski's work is said to have "paved the way for the revitalization of geometric art" and has served as a source of inspiration for the younger generation of Polish postwar artists. Magdalena Abakanowicz, for instance, closely modeled her early textile works on Stażewski's reliefs and relied on the artist's use of "contrast as an organising principle".

In 1976, critic Hilton Kramer, referring to Stażewski's early constructivist work in his review of "Constructivism in Poland 1923–1936" at the Museum of Modern Art in New York, wrote: "In the vein of geometrical painting that seeks to maximize the optical effects of shifting grids and alternating textures, Henryk Stażewski's extraordinary composition of 1930–31 in black, white and grays likewise sums up an ambition that has rarely been improved upon". A 1990 exhibition of his abstract works at Centro Atlántico de Arte Moderno in Las Palmas recognized Stażewski as a pioneer of concrete art, originally an offshoot of Neoplasticism initiated in 1930 by the Dutch painter Theo van Doesburg, which later gained popularity in Latin America during the 1940s and 1950s. In 1994, to commemorate the 100th anniversary of Stażewski's birth, Muzeum Sztuki in Łódź organized a major posthumous retrospective devoted to his oeuvre. In his review of the exhibition, critic and art historian Marek Bartelik wrote that, for Stażewski's Polish admirers, "his uncompromising stance serves today as a confirmation of their belief in the infinite depth and superiority of geometric abstraction".

In 2009, Daniel Buren, with whom Stażewski had collaborated during the 1970s, designed a temporary display space for several of Stażewski's reliefs at the Muzeum Sztuki, titled Daniel Buren / Hommage à Henryk Stazewski. Cabane éclatée avec tissu blanc et noir, travail situé, 1985–2009 and installed as an homage to the late artist. In 2015, Stażewski's Colored Relief (1963) was featured in Transmissions: Art in Eastern Europe and Latin America, 1960–1980, a comprehensive survey exhibition organized at the Museum of Modern Art in New York that examined parallels between art in Eastern Europe and Latin America during the 1960s and 1970s.

=== Collections ===
Stażewski's interwar compositions displayed in the Neoplastic Room at the Muzeum Sztuki in Łódź in 2020

Stażewski's works are included in the permanent collections of museums in Europe and the United States, including the Museum of Modern Art and the Brooklyn Museum in New York, Buffalo AKG Art Museum (formerly known as Albright–Knox Art Gallery), the Museum of Contemporary Art in Chicago, the Museum of Contemporary Art in Los Angeles, Zachęta, the National Gallery of Art in Warsaw, Museum Boijmans Van Beuningen in Rotterdam, Hungarian National Gallery in Budapest, Kröller-Müller Museum in Otterlo, the Centre Pompidou in Paris, and the Tate Modern in London.

Several of his geometric abstracts from the interwar period are on permanent display at the Neoplastic Room (Sala Neoplastyczna) at Muzeum Sztuki in Łódź. The design of the room was conceived by Władysław Strzemiński in 1948, inspired by interactions of primary colors typical of De Stijl movement, complemented by black, white and grey tones. The display was shut down in 1950 by the communist regime, until it was reconstructed based on surviving photographs. The exhibition space was expanded in 2010 to include a wider range of interwar and contemporary art from the museum's collection.

In November 2022, Stażewski's 1969 Relief No. 8 was sold for €1.03 million at Sotheby's in Milan, becoming one of the highest prices paid at auction for a 20th-century Polish work of art.

== Sources ==
- Bartelik, Marek (September 1995). "Henryk Stażewski". Artforum. Vol. 34, no. 1.
- Bazin, Jérôme; Hornyik, Sándor; Milovac, Tihomir; Stańczyk, Xawery (2018). "Narratives and Places of Cultural Opposition in the Visual Arts". In Apor, Balázs; Apor, Péter; Horváth, Sándor (eds.). The Handbook of Courage: Cultural Opposition and Its Heritage in Eastern Europe. Budapest: Institute of History, Research Centre for the Humanities, Hungarian Academy of Sciences. doi:10.24389/handbook. ISBN 978-963-416-142-4.
- Błotnicka-Mazur, Elżbieta (27 December 2019). "The Image of Art between Ideology and Modernity. Elblag Biennales of Spatial Forms in 1960s Poland". ARTis ON (9). Lisbon: University of Lisbon: 97–106. doi:10.37935/aion.v0i9.242. hdl:20.500.12153/1663. ISSN 2183-7082. S2CID 213378194.
- Bugajski, Jill (2012). "Tadeusz Kantor's Publics: Warsaw–New York". In Romijn, Peter; Scott-Smith, Giles; Segal, Joes (eds.). Divided Dreamworlds? The Cultural Cold War in East and West. Amsterdam: Amsterdam University Press. pp. 53–73. ISBN 978-90-485-1670-4.
- Henryk Stazewski: pionero polaco del arte concreto (exh. cat.) (in Spanish). Las Palmas de Gran Canaria: Centro Atlántico de Arte Moderno. 1990. OCLC 22492858.
- Cotter, Holland (3 September 2015). "Review: 'Transmissions' at MoMA Explores an Era When Art Upended Tradition". The New York Times. ISSN 0362-4331.
- Cramer, Charles; Grant, Kim (28 September 2019). "Suprematism, Part I: Kazimir Malevich". Smarthistory.
- Crowley, David (2023). Henryk Stażewski. Late Style (PDF). Łódź: Muzeum Sztuki. ISBN 978-83-66696-37-2.
- Crowley, David (2024). "The Aura of the Avant-garde—Henryk Stażewski's Contributions to the Exchange". In Pindera, Agnieszka; Polit, Paweł; Słaboń, Natalia (eds.). The 1982 Cultural Exchange Between Łódź and Los Angeles. Łódź: Muzeum Sztuki. ISBN 978-83-66696-43-3.
- Cytlak, Katarzyna (2021). "Chapter 14: Multiple Resistances to the Concept of Modernism. The Emergence of Artistic–Poetic Networks between Eastern Europe and Latin America in the Late 1960s and 1970s". In Frigeri, Flavia; Handberg, Kristian (eds.). New Histories of Art in the Global Postwar Era. Multiple Modernisms. New York: Routledge. pp. 57–69. ISBN 978-0-367-14085-4.
- Davies, Norman (2005). God's Playground. A History of Poland. Volume II: 1795 to the Present. New York: Columbia University Press. ISBN 978-0-231-12819-3.
- Fowkes, Maja; Fowkes, Reuben (2020). "Chapter 2. 1960s: Gestures of Liberation". Central and Eastern European Art Since 1950. World of Art. London: Thames & Hudson. pp. 41–71. ISBN 978-0-500-77535-6.
- Glisic, Iva (16 August 2023). "New approaches to art and life in the Polish People's Republic: Henryk Stażewski at Muzeum Sztuki". ARTMargins.
- Gołębiowska, Barbara (26 November 2019). "Powojenny optymizm i 'epidemia grypy' (1946–1954)". Mewa. M. Ewa Łunkiewicz (in Polish).
- Haidu, Rachel (September 2007). "Edward Krasinski's Studio". Artforum. Vol. 46, no. 1.
- Hartmann, Doris (2016). "Constructive-Concrete Art in GDR, Poland, and Hungary". In Bazin, Jérôme; Dubourg Glatigny, Pascal; Piotrowski, Piotr (eds.). Art Beyond Borders: Artistic Exchange in Communist Europe (1945–1989). Budapest: Central European University Press. pp. 201–209. ISBN 978-963-386-083-0.
- Inglot, Joanna (2004). "Abakanowicz's Artistic Beginnings. The Polish Cultural Milieu from 1945 to 1960". The Figurative Sculpture of Magdalena Abakanowicz. Bodies, Environments, and Myths. Berkeley: University of California Press. ISBN 978-0-520-23125-2.
- Jurkiewicz-Eckert, Dorota (2006). "Międzynarodowa Kolekcja Sztuki Nowoczesnej Muzeum Sztuki w Łodzi i jej znaczenie dla dziedzictwa kulturowego Europy". Studia Europejskie – Studies in European Affairs (in Polish). 40 (3): 121–143. ISSN 1428-149X.
- Kemp-Welch, Klara (2010). "Articulating the 'between': Stażewski's Critical Spaces". In Świtek, Gabriela (ed.). Avant-garde in the Bloc. Warsaw: Foksal Gallery Foundation. pp. 306–317. ISBN 978-3-03764-094-4.
- Kohlrausch, Martin (2019). "3. Organising New Architectural Goals". Brokers of Modernity: East Central Europe and the Rise of Modernist Architects, 1910–1950. Leuven: Leuven University Press. pp. 97–129. ISBN 978-94-6166-254-5. OCLC 1089449662.
- Kossowska, Irena (December 2001). "Henryk Stażewski". Culture.pl. Warsaw: Adam Mickiewicz Institute.
- Kramer, Hilton (7 February 1976). "Art: Constructivism in Poland". The New York Times.
- Kramer, Hilton (21 May 1976). "Art: Cletus Johnson's 'Theaters'". The New York Times. ISSN 0362-4331.
- Kulicz, K. (1965). "Ta sztuka chce wyrażać ruch i przestrzeń—Henryk Stażewski. Rozmawiamy z laureatami Nagród Ministra Kultury i Sztuki". Stolica (in Polish). No. 34. Warsaw.
- Ładnowska, Janina (1994a). "Kalendarium życia i dzieła Henryka Stażewskiego" [Chronology of Life and Work of Henryk Stażewski]. Henryk Stażewski. W setną rocznicę urodzin 1894–1988 (exhibition catalogue) (in Polish). Łódź: Muzeum Sztuki. pp. 102–171. ISBN 83-901628-5-7.
- Ładnowska, Janina (1994b). "Sztuka wolnego ładu". Henryk Stażewski. W setną rocznicę urodzin 1894–1988 (exhibition catalogue) (in Polish). Łódź: Muzeum Sztuki. ISBN 83-901628-5-7.
- Landoni, Davide (24 November 2022). "Sotheby's Milano. Morandi come nessuno mai, Boetti e Fontana tra i top lot dell'asta di casa". ArtsLife (in Italian).
- Lemoine, Serge (2018). "To the West". In Szczepaniak, Andrzej (ed.). Henryk Stażewski. Milan: Skira Editore. pp. 37–49. ISBN 978-88-572-3735-0.
- Levinger, Esther (2022). "Chapter 2: Constructivist Visions of Totality and Happiness". Constructivism in Central Europe. Painting, Typography, Photomontage. Leiden: Brill. pp. 95–172. ISBN 978-90-04-50555-1.
- Lodder, Christina (2018). "Henryk Stażewski: The Suprematist Dimension". In Szczepaniak, Andrzej (ed.). Henryk Stażewski. Milan: Skira Editore. pp. 25–37. ISBN 978-88-572-3735-0.
- Lodder, Christina; Benus, Benjamin (2012). "Constructivism". Grove Art Online. Oxford University Press. doi:10.1093/gao/9781884446054.article.T019194. ISBN 978-1-884446-05-4.
- Lodder, Christina; Forgács, Éva (2019). "Suprematism: A Shortcut into the Future: The Reception of Malevich by Polish and Hungarian Artists during the Inter-War Period". Celebrating Suprematism: New Approaches to the Art of Kazimir Malevich. Leiden: Brill. pp. 240–258. doi:10.1163/9789004384989_014. ISBN 978-90-04-38498-9. Archived from the original on 29 November 2021.
- Mansbach, Steven (2012). "Delayed Discovery or Willful Forgetting? The Reception of Polish Classical Modernism in America". Slavic Review. 71 (3): 489–515. doi:10.5612/slavicreview.71.3.0489. ISSN 0037-6779. S2CID 164189073.
- Markowska, Anna (2020). "Malarstwo w poszerzonym polu. Sala Neoplastyczna jako suplement i obraz szkatułkowy". In Kiepuszewski, Ł.; Haake, M.; Juszkiewicz, P. (eds.). Obraz jako obiekt teoretyczny. Studia z teorii i historii badań nad sztuką, T. 2 (in Polish). Poznań: Wydawnictwo Naukowe Uniwersytetu Adama Mickiewicza. pp. 149–177. ISBN 978-83-232-3839-3.
- Mikina, Ewa (2003). "Stażewski, Henryk". Grove Art Online. Oxford University Press. doi:10.1093/gao/9781884446054.article.T081120.
- Moskalewicz, Magdalena (2021). "Three Scenes from the Artistic Life of Henryk Stażewski". In Tomaszewski, Patryk P. (ed.). Henryk Stażewski: Constructing Reliefs. New York: The Kosciuszko Foundation. pp. 30–37. ISBN 978-0-578-99560-1.
- Moskalewicz, Magdalena (2022). "Knots: Abakanowicz and the Polish Art Scene in the 1960s". In Coxon, Ann; Jacob, Mary Jane (eds.). Magdalena Abakanowicz. London: Tate Publishing. pp. 31–65. ISBN 978-1-84976-673-9.
- "Galerie 1–36 – Eustachy Kossakowski archive". artmuseum.pl. Museum of Modern Art in Warsaw.
- "History of the Museum". Muzeum Sztuki w Łodzi.
- "Stefan Gierowski i Galeria Krzywe Koło". Muzeum Sztuki w Łodzi (in Polish). Łódź.
- "Wróblewski, Opałka i Abakanowicz. 10 najdroższych prac polskich artystów". Onet Kultura (in Polish). 1 December 2021.
- Partum, Berenika (8 March 2009). "Daniel Buren: Hommage à Henryk Stazewski, Cabane éclatée avec tissu blanc et noir, travail situé, 1985–2009: Musealisierung der Kritik?". artmagazine.cc.
- Pindera, Agnieszka; Polit, Paweł; Słaboń, Natalia, eds. (2024). The 1982 Cultural Exchange Between Łódź and Los Angeles. Łódź: Muzeum Sztuki. ISBN 978-83-66696-43-3.
- Piotrowski, Piotr (2011). In the Shadow of Yalta. Art and the Avant-garde in Eastern Europe, 1945–1989. Translated by Brzyski, Anna. London: Reaktion Books. ISBN 978-1-86189-863-0.
- "Uchwała Rady Państwa z dnia 11 lipca 1955 r. nr 0/1085a" (PDF). European Legislation Identifier (List of individuals who were given awards by the Polish People's Republic in 1955) (in Polish). 1955.
- Skowronek, Thomas (2016). "Crossing the Border: The Foksal Gallery from Warsaw in Lausanne/Paris (1970) and Edinburgh (1972 and 1979)". In Bazin, Jérôme; Dubourg Glatigny, Pascal; Piotrowski, Piotr (eds.). Art Beyond Borders: Artistic Exchange in Communist Europe (1945–1989). Budapest: Central European University Press. pp. 381–393. ISBN 978-963-386-083-0.
- Stażewski, Henryk (1968). "Wypowiedź Henryka Stażewskiego". Odra (in Polish). No. 2. pp. 63–66.
- Stażewski, Henryk (1983). Hultén, Pontus; Ptaszkowska, Anna (eds.). "An artistic conversation, 1931–1982: Poland/USA": translation supplement [for the] Ulster Museum, Belfast (Exhibited initially in Paris in 1982 and later in Belfast in 1983. No page numbers.). Belfast: Ulster Museum. OCLC 810685744.
- Strożek, Przemysław (2013). "The Magazine Formiści and the Early International Contacts of the Polish Avant-Garde (1919–1921)". Rocznik Historii Sztuki. 38. Warsaw: Polish Academy of Sciences.
- Suchan, Jarosław (2017). "Kobro and Strzemiński: Prototypes of a New Thinking". Kobro and Strzemiński: Avant-Garde Prototypes (exhibition catalogue). Madrid: Museo Nacional Centro de Arte Reina Sofía. ISBN 978-84-8026-550-8.
- Suchan, Jarosław (n.d.). "Sala Neoplastyczna. Kompozycja otwarta". Muzeum Sztuki w Łodzi (in Polish).
- Szczepaniak, Andrzej (2018). "Henryk Stażewski, 1894–1988". In Szczepaniak, Andrzej (ed.). Henryk Stażewski. Milan: Skira Editore. pp. 9–25. ISBN 978-88-572-3735-0.
- Tomaszewski, Patryk P. (2021). "Henryk Stażewski's Path to Reliefs, 1950–1959". In Tomaszewski, Patryk P. (ed.). Henryk Stażewski: Constructing Reliefs. New York: The Kosciuszko Foundation. pp. 16–34. ISBN 978-0-578-99560-1.
- Turowski, Andrzej (2005). "Stażewski Internacjonał". In Jurkiewicz, Małgorzata; Mytkowska, Joanna; Borowski, Wiesław (eds.). Henryk Stażewski. Ekonomia myślenia i postrzegania (in Polish). Warsaw: Foksal Gallery Foundation. pp. 29–31. ISBN 83-89302-05-5.
- Tyszkiewicz, Jakub (1997). Sto wielkich dni Wrocławia: wystawa Ziem Odzyskanych we Wrocławiu a propaganda polityczna Ziem Zachodnich i Północnych w latach 1945–1948 (in Polish). Wrocław: Wydawnictwo Arboretum. ISBN 83-86308-25-7.
- Warszewska-Kołodziej, Agata (2012). "Materiały i konstrukcja wybranych reliefów Henryka Stażewskiego". Acta Universitatis Nicolai Copernici. Zabytkoznawstwo i Konserwatorstwo (in Polish). 410 (43). Toruń: Nicolaus Copernicus University: 227–256. doi:10.12775/AUNC_ZiK.2012.012.
- Wenderski, Michał (21 September 2018). "From Łódź to Leiden—On International Contacts of the Polish Inter-war Avant-garde". Muzealnictwo. 59: 203–210. doi:10.5604/01.3001.0012.5067 (inactive 12 July 2025). ISSN 0464-1086.
- Wróblewska, Magdalena (July 2010). "Maria Ewa Łunkiewicz-Rogoyska". Culture.pl. Warsaw: Adam Mickiewicz Institute.
- Zboralska, Marta (1 March 2023). "Henryk Stażewski's Art in America". Archives of American Art Journal. 62 (1): 4–19. doi:10.1086/725119. ISSN 0003-9853.
