= Biennale of Spatial Forms in Elbląg =

Polish art exhibition

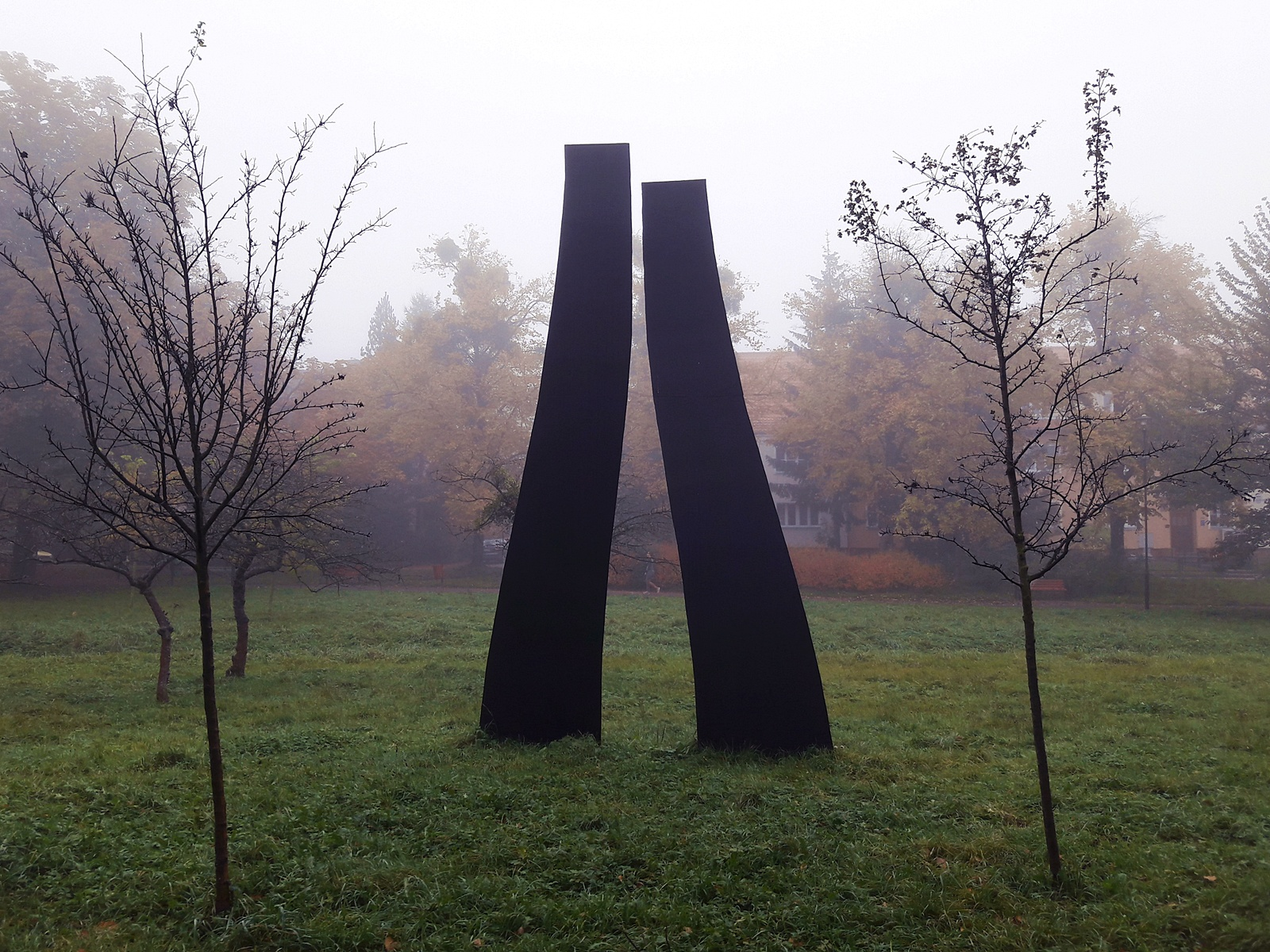
An outdoor large-scale sculpture by Zbigniew Dłubak exhibited at the First Biennial of Spatial Forms in 1965, currently located in Kajki Park in Elbląg

Biennale of Spatial Forms in Elbląg (Biennale Form Przestrzennych w Elblągu) was a bi-annual art exhibition organized by state-owned Zakłady Mechaniczne Zamech in Elbląg (Polish People's Republic) between 1965 and 1973. Described as the largest "experiment combining art and industry in Poland", the biennale had five editions, with only the first two dedicated primarily to sculpture and spatial forms.

== History ==
Initiated by the artist Gerard Kwiatkowski, a founder of the EL Gallery, the premise of the biennale relied on close collaboration between local craftsmen and contemporary artists. It its attempts to bring artists and workers together and to escape the confines of museum walls, the Elbląg Biennale has been described as an example of performed "collective labor" and compared to the activities of Polish Constructivist artists in Poland during the 1920s and 1930s.

Throughout its history, the biennale showed work by numerous prominent Polish and international artists, including Magdalena Abakanowicz, Jan Berdyszak, Henryk Berlewi, Marian Bogusz, Włodzimierz Borowski, Zbigniew Dłubak, Tihamér Gyarmathy, Oskar Hansen, Jerzy Jarnuszkiewicz, Edward Krasiński, Jadwiga Maziarska, Ewa Partum, Henryk Stażewski and Magdalena Więcek-Wnuk.
