= Vladimir Markov =

Vladimir Markov may refer to:

- Vladimir Markov (mathematician) (1871–1897), Russian mathematician
- Vladimir Markov (footballer, born 1889) (1889–1942), Russian football defender
- Vladimir Markov (politician) (1859–1919), Finnish general and politician
- Vladimir Ivanovich Markov, Latvian artist also known as Voldemārs Matvejs
