= Sala Neoplastyczna =

Avant-garde art installation in Łódź

- Neoplastic Room (English)
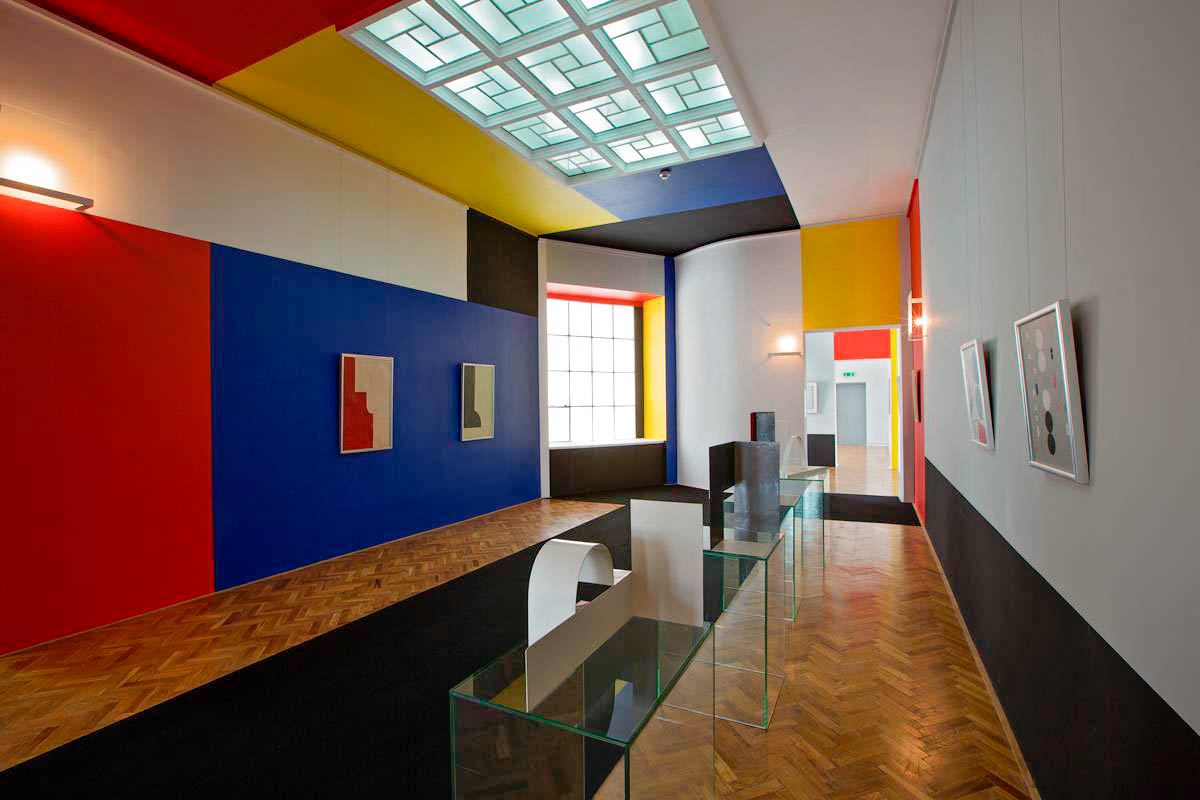
- Sala Neoplastyczna in 2013
- Artist: Władysław Strzemiński
- Completion date: 1948 (reconstructed in 1960 by Bolesław Utkin)
- Movement: Neoplasticism, Constructivism
- Location: Museum of Art, Łódź, Łódź

Sala Neoplastyczna (Neoplastic Room) is a permanent exhibition space at Muzeum Sztuki in Łódź originally designed by the Polish avant-garde artist Władysław Strzemiński in collaboration with the director of the museum Marian Minich in 1948. It was intended to showcase the works by European avant-garde artists of the interwar period, including Katarzyna Kobro, Theo van Doesburg and Henryk Berlewi, among others.

== History ==
=== Design and installation (1948) ===
The idea for the Neoplastic Room emerged in the aftermath of World War II when the director Marian Minich, who had been leading the institution since 1935, expressed a desire to create a dedicated space for displaying works by European interwar avant-garde artists from the museum's collection. It was conceived for the museum's new location at the Poznański family palace on Więckowskiego Street.

The Neoplastic Room was designed in 1948 by Władysław Strzemiński, one of the pivotal artists associated with Polish Constructivism and a co-founder of the a.r. group, which formed the core of the museum's pre-war collection. Strzemiński's project for the room was based on a 1931 manifesto he wrote together with his wife Katarzyna Kobro, titled Composition of Space: Calculations of Space-Time Rhythm.

Intended to achieve a "balance and harmony of space", the Neoplastic Room and its name were inspired by the ideas and visual vocabulary of the Dutch Neoplasticism movement originally established by Piet Mondrian and Theo van Doesburg. The space, "divided into planes based on strict mathematical calculations and painted with basic colours (red, blue, and yellow)", was augmented by vertical and horizontal arrangement in white, gray, and black. The Neoplastic Room originally featured works by Berlewi, van Doesburg, Sophie Taeuber-Arp, Vilmos Huszár, Jean Hélion, Henryk Stażewski, and Georges Vantongerloo. In addition to displaying paintings, the room showcased abstract sculptures by Kobro called Spatial Compositions (Kompozycje przestrzenne), which were placed on custom-designed glass pedestals.

=== Later history (1950–present) ===
Neoplastic Room at Muzeum Sztuki in Łódź seen in 2020 with works by Henryk Stażewski

The Neoplastic Room survived only until October 1, 1950, when it was shut down due to the imposition of the Socialist Realist doctrine in Stalinist Poland. This followed the firing of Strzemiński from the Łódź Academy of Fine Arts earlier that year by the deputy minister of culture and arts Włodzimierz Sokorski. The space was painted over and the works were moved to warehouses, as modernism and avant-garde ran counter to Stalinist cultural policies. The room was reconstructed in 1960 by Bolesław Utkin, following the 1956 Khrushchev Thaw and subsequent liberalization of cultural policies across the Soviet Union and the Eastern Bloc. A student of Strzemiński, Utkin based his reconstruction of the Neoplastic Room on preserved photographs. Since then, the room has been renovated multiple times and has become the most prominent permanent exhibition space at the museum.

== Sources ==
- Adamczewska, Izabella (May 29, 2023). "Nowa wystawa w Muzeum Sztuki w Łodzi. Rekonstrukcja Galerii Sztuki Nowoczesnej z Salą Neoplastyczną" [A new exhibition at the Muzeum Sztuki in Łódź: a reconstruction of the Gallery of Modern Art with the Neoplastic Room]. Gazeta Wyborcza (in Polish).
- Kiliszek, Joanna (2022). "Living Simulacrum: The Neoplastic Room in Łódź: 1948 / 1960 / 1966 / 1983 / 2006 / 2008 / 2010 / 2011 / 2013 / 2017 / ∞". In Baldacci, Cristina; Nicastro, Clio; Sforzini, Arianna (eds.). Over and Over and Over Again: Reenactment Strategies in Contemporary Arts and Theory. Cultural Inquiry. Vol. 21. Berlin: ICI Berlin Press. pp. 219–229. doi:10.37050/ci-21_22. ISBN 978-3-96558-027-5.
- Kurc-Maj, Paulina (2023). Sala Neoplastyczna. Stan początkowy [The Neoplastic Room: Initial State] (PDF) (in Polish and English). Łódź: Muzeum Sztuki. ISBN 978-83-66696-39-6.
- Ładnowska, Janina (2005). "Katarzyna Kobro – zarys twórczości". In Fuchs, Elżbieta; et al. (eds.). Katarzyna Kobro 1898–1951: w setną rocznicę urodzin (exh. cat.) (in Polish). Łódź: Muzeum Sztuki. ISBN 978-83-87937-41-6.
