= Hel Enri =

Polish-Jewish painter

- על־ענרי
- Born: Khaye Leye Shrayber; 20 March 1873; Warsaw, Congress Poland, Russian Empire
- Died: 18 December 1976 (aged 103); Paris, France
- Other names: Helena Berlewi
- Occupation: Painter
- Years active: 1952–1976
- Style: Naive art
- Children: Henryk Berlewi

Helena Berlewi (Yiddish: העלענאַ בערלעװי; born Khaye Leye Shrayber [Yiddish: חיה לאה שרײַבער]; 20 March [O.S. 8 March] 1873 – 18 December 1976), known pseudonymously as Hel Enri (Yiddish: על־ענרי), was a Polish-Jewish painter active in Paris. She was the mother of avant-garde artist Henryk Berlewi.

== Early life ==
By the age of 18, Berlewi was married to her husband, Israel. She had three children, including artist Henryk Berlewi. In 1928, as a widow, she emigrated to France.

During the Nazi occupation, Berlewi was held in a transit camp with her daughter, Stefania, in Tours, France. She avoided being transferred to a concentration camp, hiding in the south of France. After the end of World War II, she became a social worker in Nice to assist wartime victims.

== Career ==
On 14 January 1952, at the age of 79, Berlewi painted her first painting using her son Henryk's materials in his studio. Henryk was surprised to come across the unknown painting, thinking that he arranged for its professional valuation. Two years later, in 1954, her artistic career formally began with her debut solo exhibition at the Galerie M. Bénézit in Paris, under the pseudonym Hel Enri which she adopted for the remainder of her career.

Berlewi described her floral, abstract paintings as "herbariums." Critics have classified her work as naive, consistent with her untrained background. Her work has been compared stylistically to Georgia O'Keeffe, Niki de Saint Phalle, Sam Francis, Vincent van Gogh, Henri Matisse, and her son Henryk, whose Constructivist mechano-faktura framework informed her greatly.

By 1970, Berlewi's work was featured in over 30 exhibitions across the globe, including two in her native Poland.

== Museum collections ==
Berlewi's work exists in the permanent collections of the Musée d'Art Moderne de Paris, the Tel Aviv Museum of Art, the National Museum in Warsaw, and the National Museum of Ethnography in Warsaw.

== Exhibitions ==
- 1954: Solo exhibition, Galerie M. Bénézit, Paris.
- 16 May 1958 – 30 May 1958: Zachęta National Gallery of Art, Warsaw.
- 1955: Découvrir, Galerie Charpentier, Paris.
- 1966: Klubie Międzynarodowej Prasy i Książki, Warsaw.
- 1968: Peinture naïve, La Boetie Gallery, New York.
- 1970: Hel Enri. Retrospective 1952 – 1970. Galerie Verrière, Lyon, France.
- 17 May 2019 – 14 June 2019: Hel Enri. The Power of Colour. Wejman Gallery, Warsaw.
- 28 June 2024 – 16 September 2024: "Bio-faktura." The Paintings of Hel Enri, POLIN Museum of the History of Polish Jews, Warsaw.
