= Faktura =

Russian art criticism term

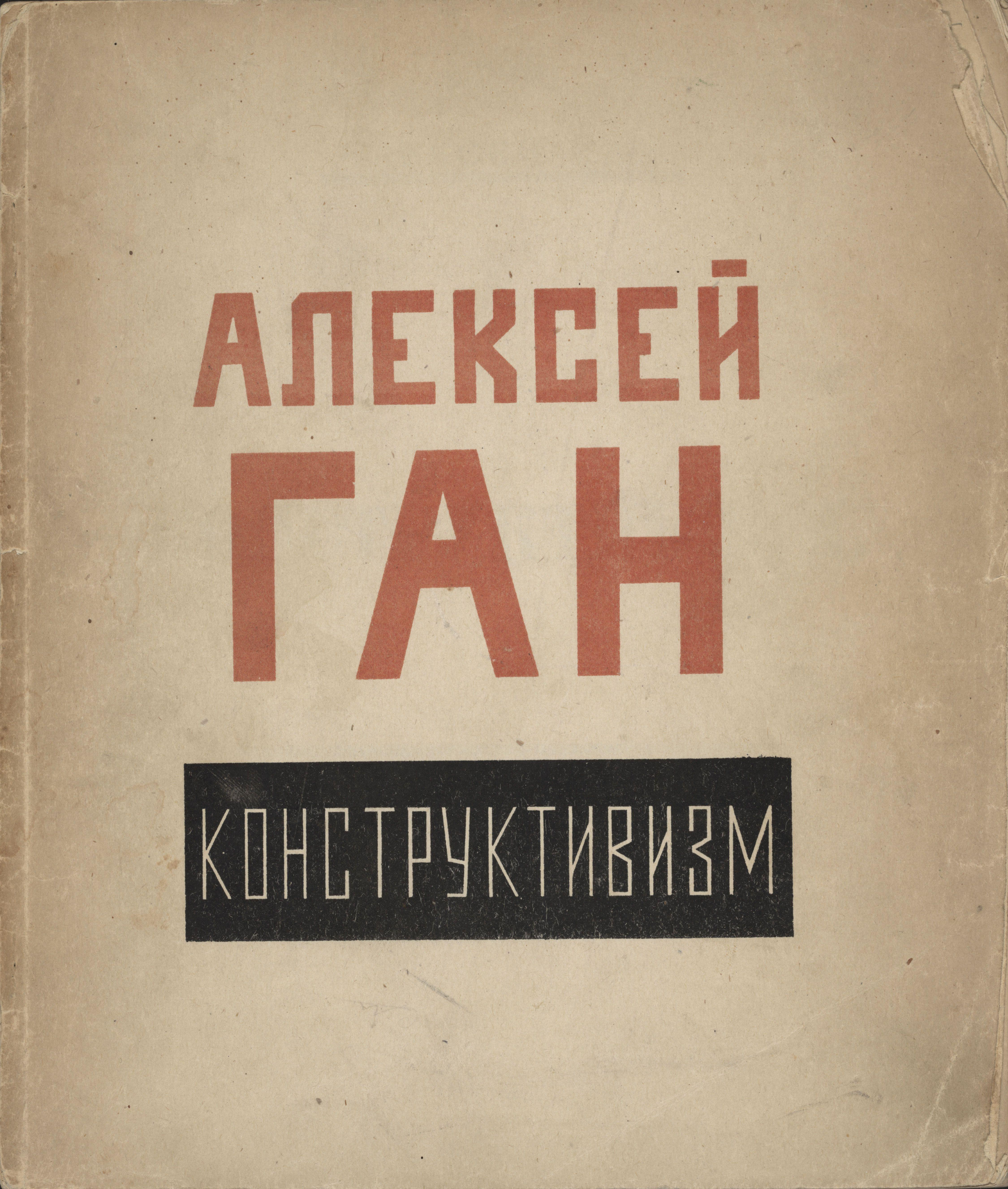
The cover of Konstruktivizm by Aleksei Gan, 1922.

The term of faktura (Russian: фактура) emerged in Russian art criticism before the First World War. David Burliuk used the term as a Russian equivalent of the French word "facture" which refers to the texture of the painted surface. Voldemārs Matvejs used the term in his 1914 text "Printsipy tvorchestva v plasticheskikh iskussvakh: Faktura (Principles of Creation in the Visual Arts: Faktura).

It was later developed by Russian Constructivism. Alongside tectonics and construction, faktura constituted one of the three core principles defined by Aleksei Gan in his book Konstruktivizm. In the period after the Russian Revolution, new definitions of art had to be found, such as the definition of art objects as "laboratory experiments". "Faktura" was the single most important quality of these art objects, according to the critic Victor Shklovsky, referring to the material aspect of the appearance. The surface of the object had to demonstrate how it had been made, exhibiting its own distinct property.

Thus Faktura could be characterised as the visual demonstration of properties inherent to materials, as illustrated in Corner Counter Relief (1914) by Vladimir Tatlin.
