= Zbigniew Dłubak =

Polish painter, photographer, and art theoretician

Zbigniew Andrzej Dłubak (1921–2005) was a Polish painter, photographer, and art theoretician.

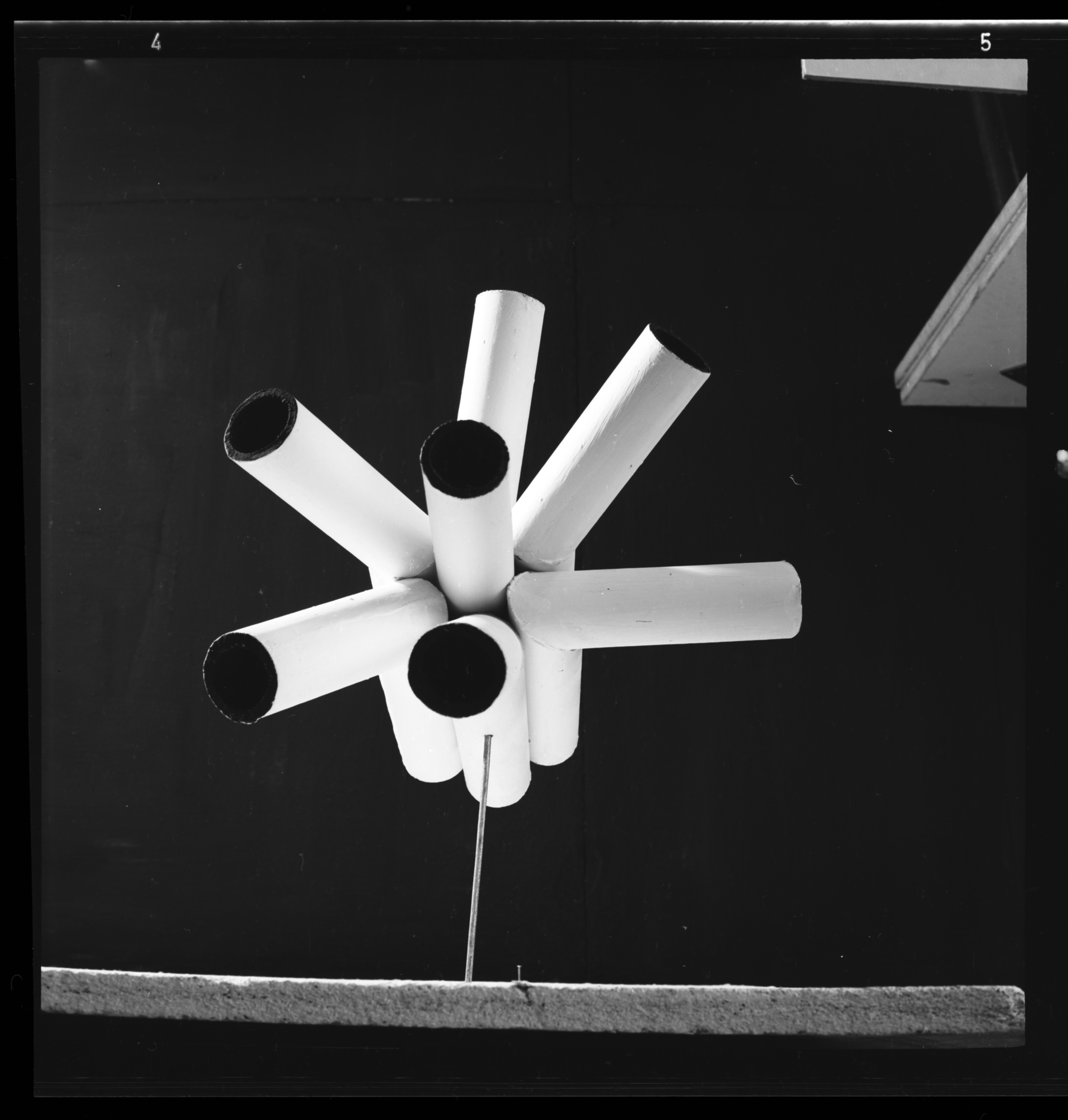
Kompendium, Zbigniew Dłubak, Natalia Lach-Lachowicz, Andrzej Lachowicz, Wrocław Contemporary Museum

Dłubak was born on April 26, 1921, in Radomsko. During World War II, following the AB Action aimed at the Polish intelligentsia and Scouting movement, he was arrested and sent to the Mauthausen-Gusen concentration camp, but managed to survive.

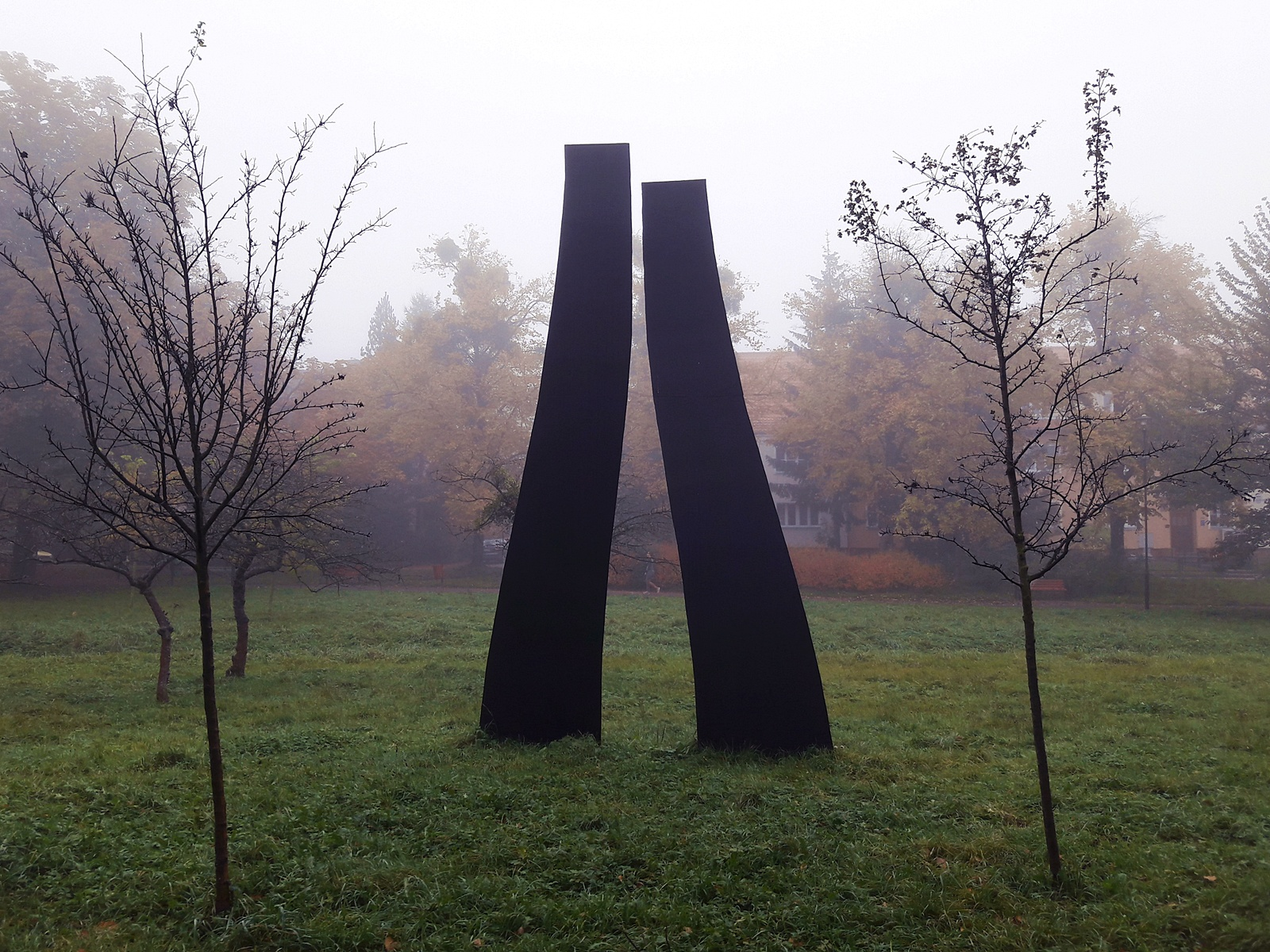
Biennale Form Przestrzennych in Elbląg

In 1945 he returned to Poland, where he took an active part in the reconstruction of Polish artistic life after six years of foreign occupation. He became one of the cofounders of Grupa 55. He also cooperated with various art galleries and artistic groups, among them Krzywe Koło, Współczesna, Mała Galeria, Labirynt, Zamek, Remont, Permafo, and Foto-Medium-Art. Between 1953 and 1972 he was editor-in-chief of the Fotografia monthly. He was also a tutor at the National Film School in Łódź and at the Higher School of Fine Arts in Łódź.

In 1975 he organized a group of youngsters interested in art theory into the Seminarium Warszawskie (Warsaw Seminary) group and discussion club. In 1982, during the period of Martial law in Poland, he was allowed to leave the country and settled in Meudon near Paris. He died August 21, 2005, in Warsaw.

In his oeuvre he had, among others, series of paintings (Wojna, Macierzyństwo, Amonity, Antropolity, Movens, Systemy) and cycles of photography (Egzystencje, Gestykulacje). He was one of the winners of 'Nagroda Prezesa Rady Ministrów I stopnia' (The Prime Minister's Award of the I Grade) in 1979. He was awarded with Order of the Cross of Grunwald of the third grade, a Golden and Silver Cross of Merit, Cross of Valour.
