= Maria Łunkiewicz-Rogoyska =

Polish painter

- Born: 5 April 1895; Ternopil, Ukraine
- Died: 4 September 1967 (aged 72); Warsaw, Poland
- Occupation: Painter

Maria Łunkiewicz-Rogoyska (5 April 1895 – 4 September 1967) was a Polish painter. Her work was part of the painting event in the art competition at the 1936 Summer Olympics.
