= Jan Berdyszak =

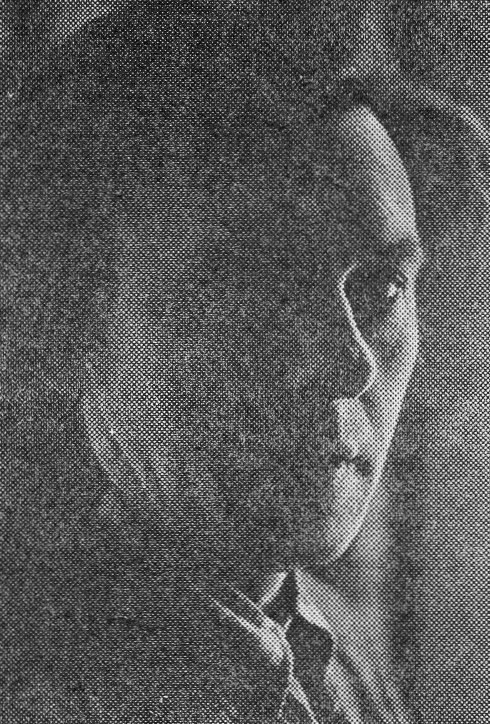
Late Jan Berdyszak

Jan Berdyszak (15 June 1934 –18 September 2014) was a Polish artist. From 1952 to 1958, he studied at the Sculpture Department of the State College of Fine Arts in Poznań (now Fine Arts Academy), where he eventually returned as a lecturer. He participated in numerous exhibitions both in Poland and abroad. His works were exhibited in the Foto-Medium-Art Gallery in 1980, 1986, 1995 and 2007.

In honor of his merits for culture he was appointed a Knight of Polonia Restituta Order in 1988 and an Officer of Polonia Restituta in 2001. He also received the Doctorate Honoris Causa of Fine Arts Academy in Bratislava in 1999.

== Projects ==
Berdyszak's artistic projects cover a wide range of fields and techniques, including graphic design, sculpture, installations, photography, and stage designs for theatre performances. His art is frequently analytical and academic, and he frequently deliberates on variations of a particular problem, sometimes bringing threads from past projects into subsequent ones.

A number of Berdyszak's works concentrate on the issue of space, which he defined as "the original being, and also density, darkness, void, transparency and potentiality." He later focused on notions of sacrum, space-time continuum and infinity. His sculpture projects and stage designs frequently reflect on light, words, and movement.

== Works ==
The artist's works have been purchased by museums and private collections including the National Museums in Warsaw, Cracow, Wrocław; Art Museum in Łódź, Staatliches Museum in Berlin, UNESCO Collection in Paris, The Kosciuszko Foundation in New York, Boston Museum of Fine Art and the Pushkin Museum in Moscow.

=== List of selected works ===
- Double Circles, 1962–64
- Compositions of Circles, 1963
- Structural Painting with an OpeningIII, 1965
- Animated Art, 1966–1970
- Transparent, 1970–1979
- Frames of the East, 1972
- Silence, 1972–1975
- Reserved Seats, 1973–1976
- Infinity, 1975–1977
- Beams of the Cross, 1977–1988
- Fragments as Radical Wholes, 1982–1984
- Others to Bases, 1982–1984
- States of Morality, 1985–1987
- At the Stone, 1986–1988
- Neither Necessity Nor Possibility, 1987–1995
- Beams, 1988–2001
- Passe-pas-tout, 1990-2000
- Apres Passe-par-tout, 2000
- Photographic Re-Installations, 1992-?
- Covers and Aftercovers, 1995-?

== Photo gallery ==
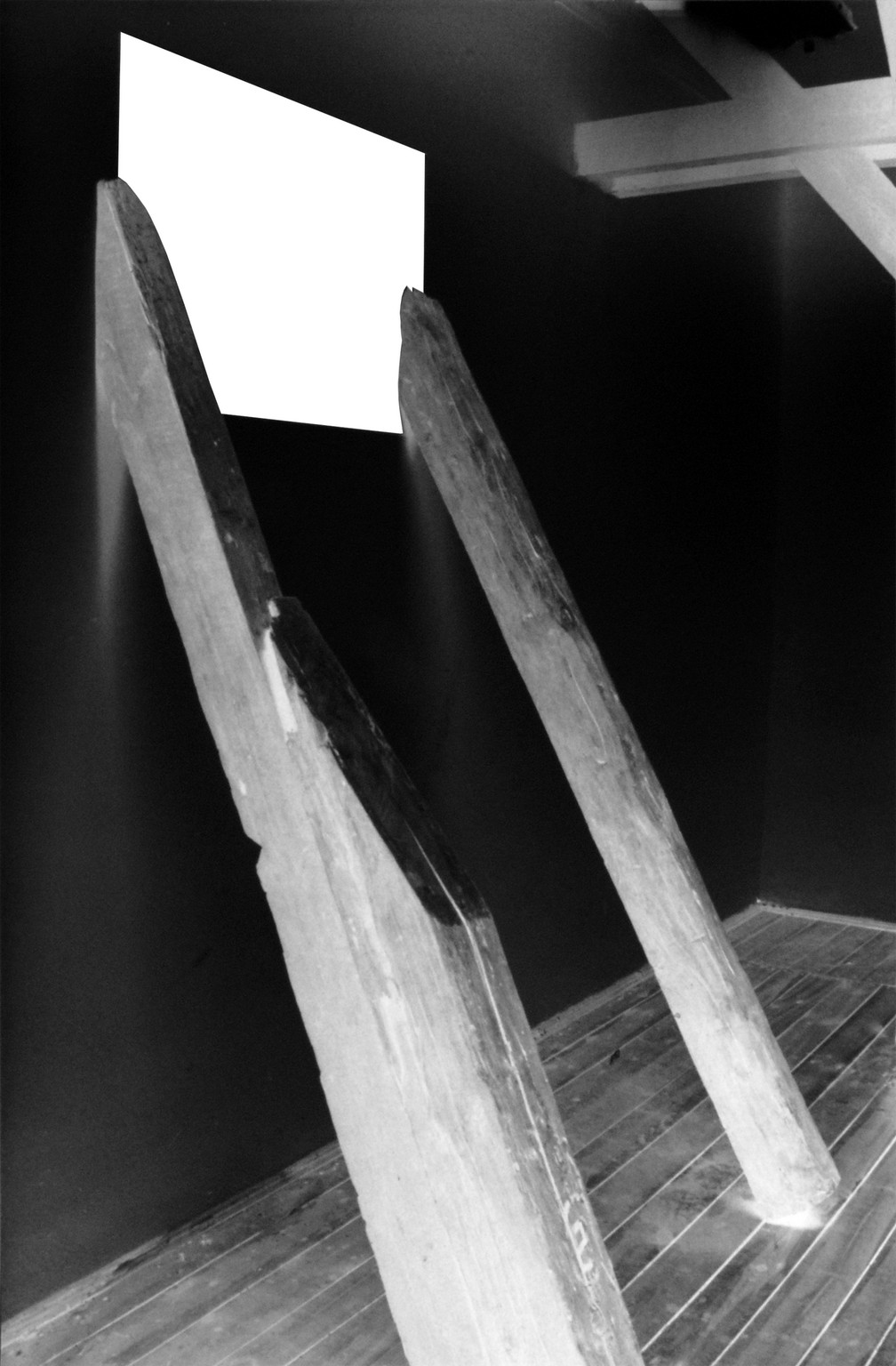
Jan Berdyszak, Dwie przezroczystości/Two transparency, 1991-2006

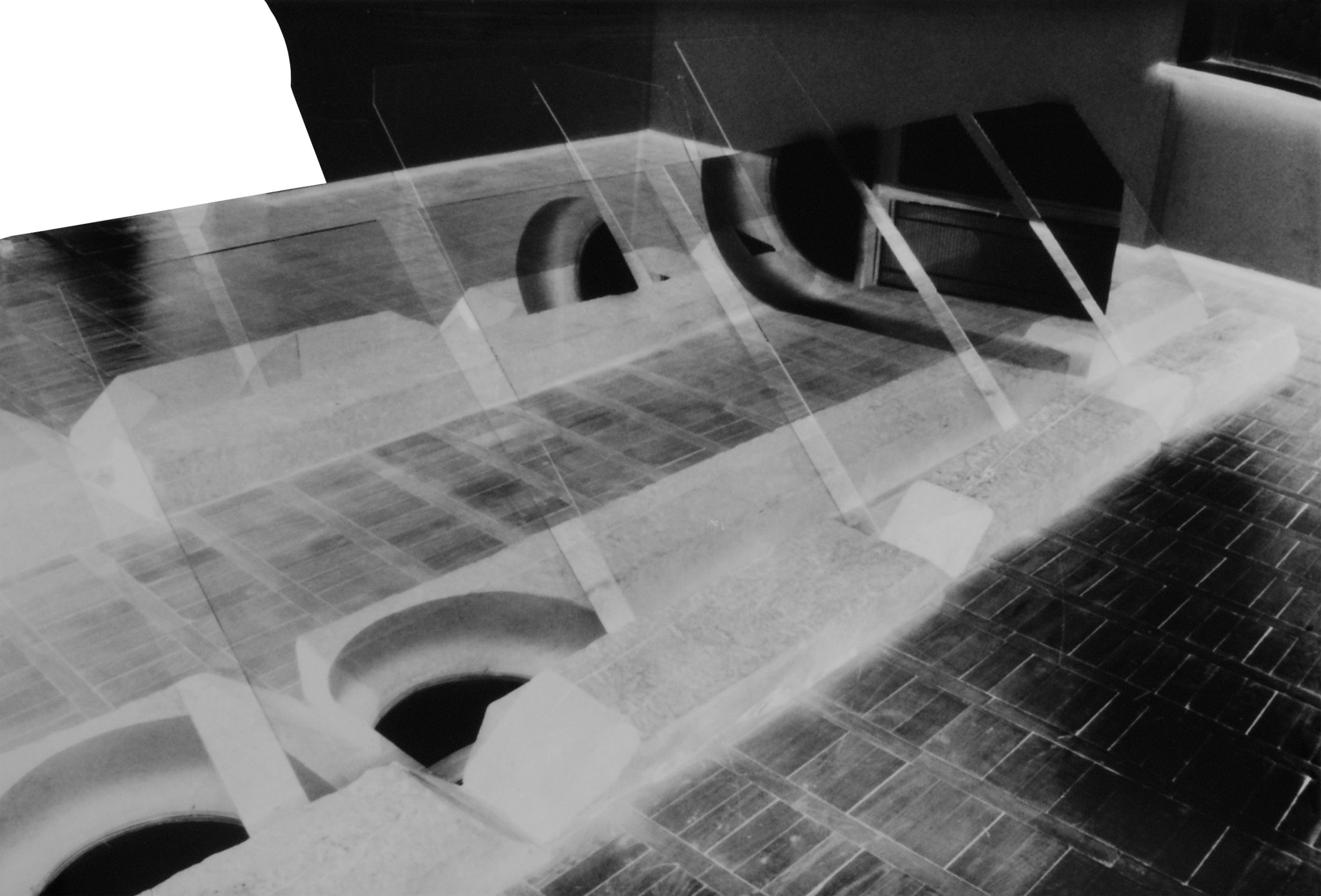
Jan Berdyszak, Reinstalacja obrazogenna, 1993

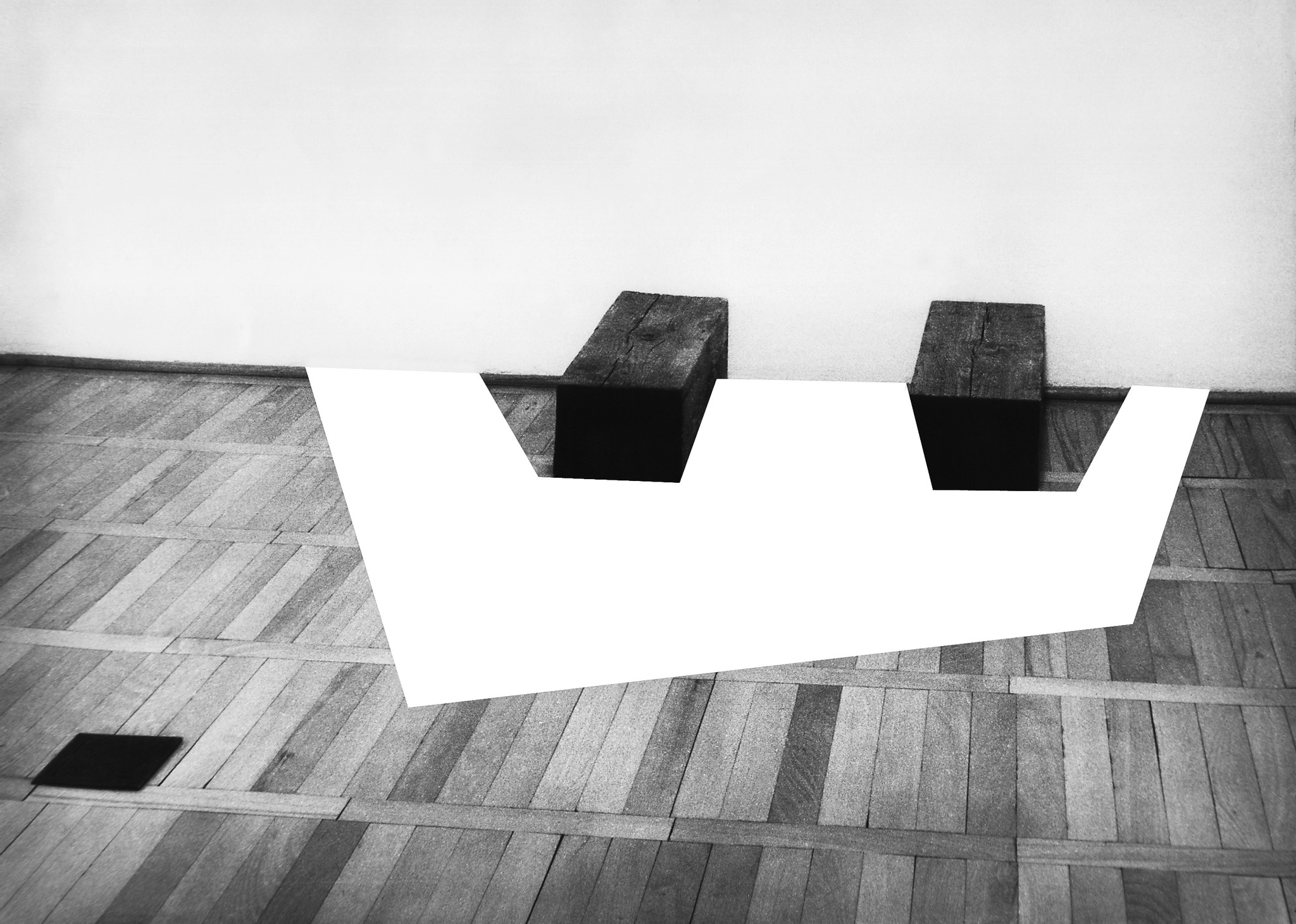
Jan Berdyszak, Reinstalacja sytuacyjna II/Situation Reinstallation II, 1993

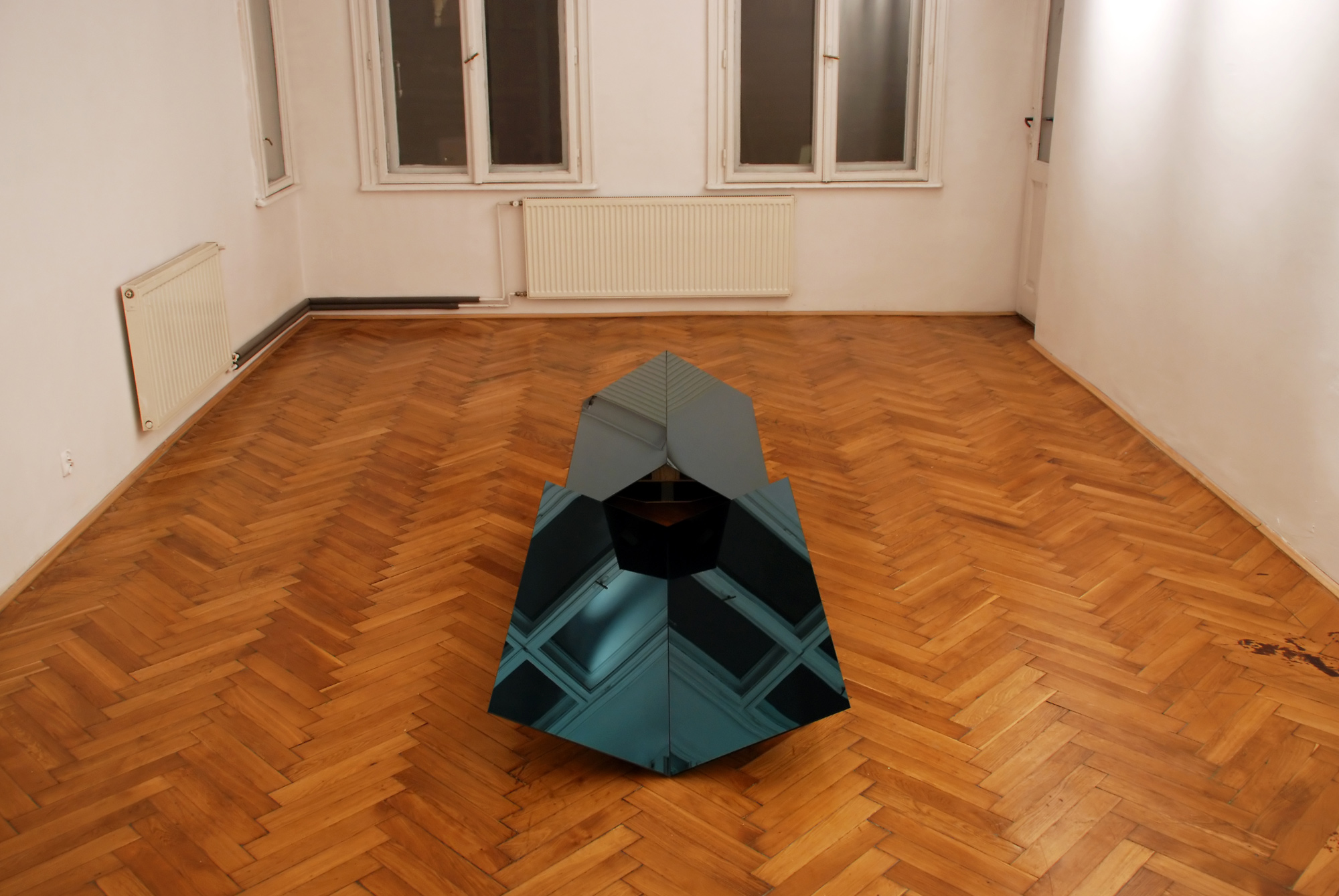
Jan Berdyszak, Generator fotografii efemerycznych/Generator of Ephemeral Photographs, 2008

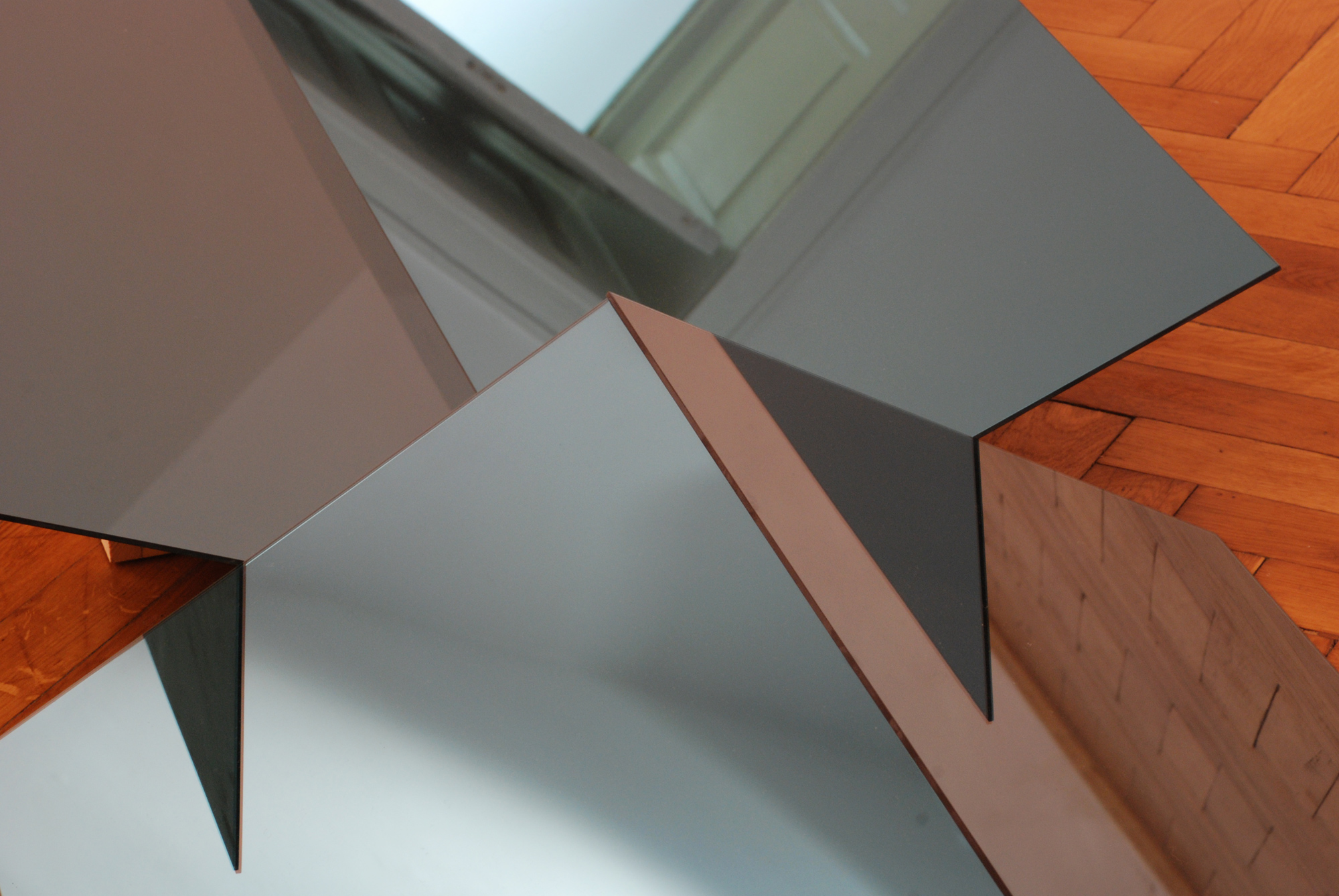
Jan Berdyszak, Generator fotografii efemerycznych/Generator of Ephemeral Photographs, 2008

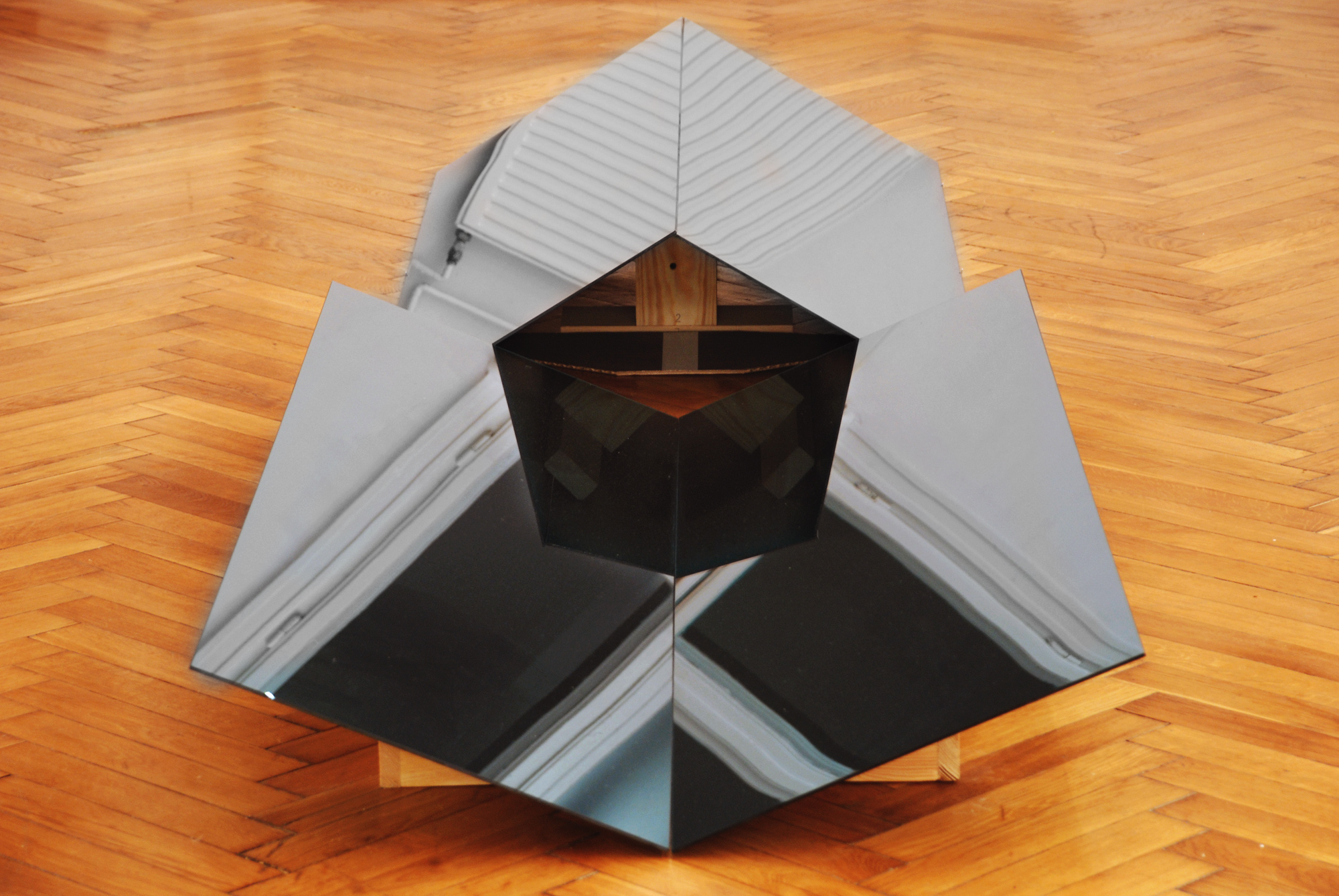
Jan Berdyszak, Generator fotografii efemerycznych/Generator of Ephemeral Photographs, 2008

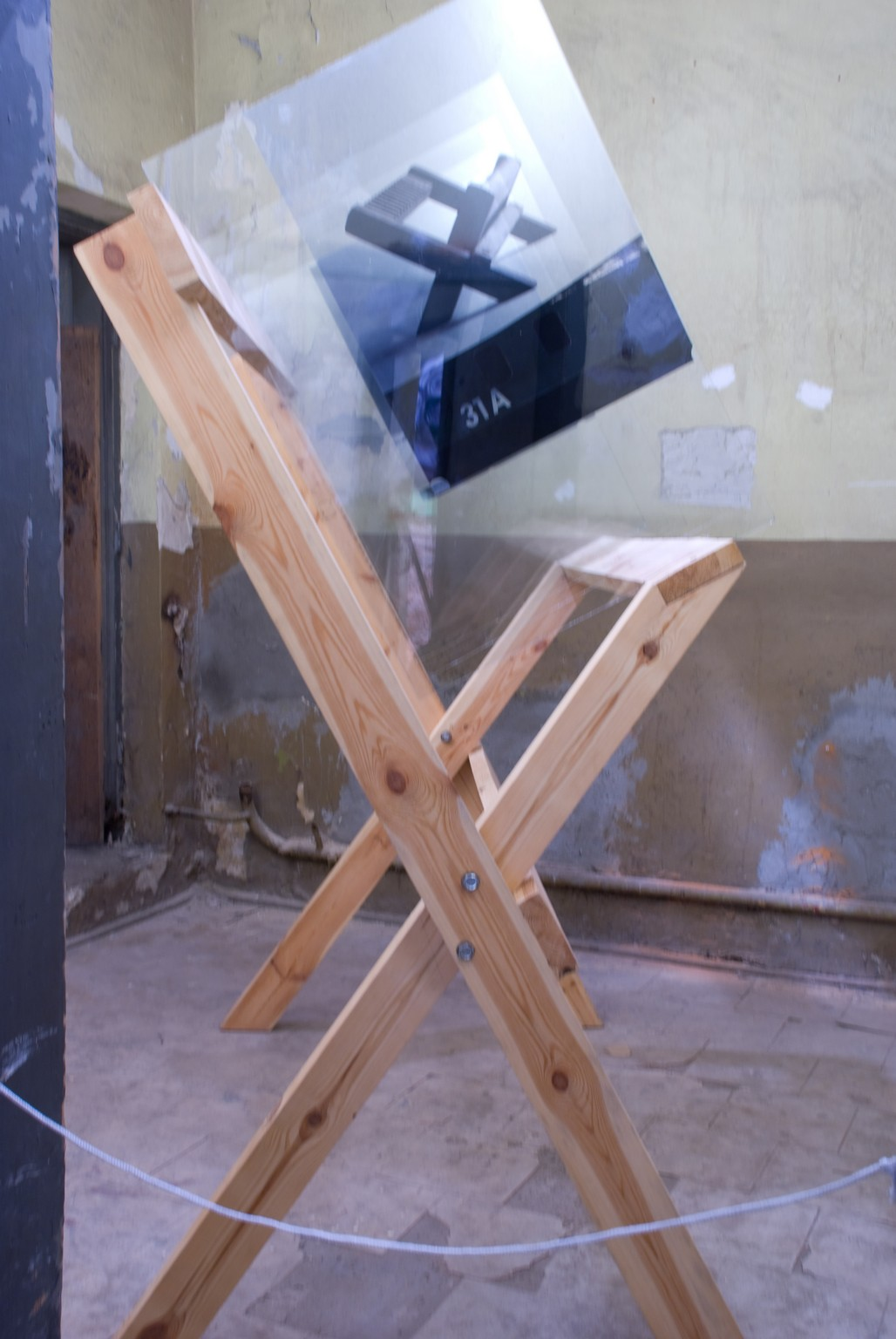
Jan Berdyszak, Rekonstrukcja/Reconstruction, 1995

== Bibliography ==
- Now! Artists of Foto-Medium-Art Gallery, Mazowieckie Centrum Sztuki Współczesnej „Elektrownia” w Radomiu, Radom 2008.
