= Klara Kemp-Welch =

British art historian

Klara Kemp-Welch is an art historian and academic, specialising in modern and contemporary Eastern European art and the intersections of art and politics. Her work focuses on themes including modern and contemporary art, migration and mobility, international relations, the Cold War, Eastern European art and politics, post-socialism, and European Union dynamics

She is Professor of Modern and Contemporary Art History at the Courtauld Institute of Art, University of London, and acting Head of Research Degrees for the 2025–2028 term.

She is the author of two monographs. Networking the Bloc: Experimental Art in Eastern Europe, 1965-1981 (MIT Press, 2019) offered the first networked survey of the experimental zeitgeist in Eastern European art, examined through personal encounters and collaborative exchanges, using archival material gathered in twelve countries to counter Cold War narratives of Eastern-bloc isolation. The book was well received. The Art Journal reviewer described it as a ‘companiable guide through the complex transnational art worlds of Eastern Europe’ which ‘brilliantly investigates local primary materials within an international artworld setting’.

A reviewer of her earlier monograph, Antipolitics in Central European Art. Reticence as Dissidence under Post-Totalitarian Rule (IB Tauris, 2014; Bloomsbury, 2017) wrote that ‘Kemp-Welch’s contributions as a scholar who persistently engages the complex intersections of art and politics in the former East… will… spark productive debates while setting a high bar for anyone who wants to weave together theoretical insights, sociopolitical contexts, transnational geographies, and wide-ranging erudition in and beyond the visual arts’.

Her current research investigates themes of migration, mobility, and border politics in Eastern European contemporary art, under the provisional title Free Movement?

== Early life and education ==
Kemp-Welch earned her PhD in History of Art in 2008, supervised by Professor Briony Fer, following earlier studies at University College London and the School of Slavonic and East European Studies.

Before her appointment at the Courtauld in 2009, she taught at University College London, Camberwell (University of the Arts London), and the University of York.

== Publications ==
- Special issue of ArtMargins: Artists' Networks in Latin America and Eastern Europe (2012)
- Antipolitics in Central European Art: Reticence as Dissidence under Post-Totalitarian Rule 1956–1989 (Bloomsbury Publishing, IB Tauris, 2014)
- Networking the Bloc: Experimental Art in Eastern Europe 1965–1981, (MIT Press, 12 February 2019; ISBN 9780262038300)
- Co-editor (with Beáta Hock and Jonathan Owen) of A Reader in East-Central European Modernism 1918–1956 (Courtauld Books Online, 2019)
