= Ewa Partum =

Polish artist

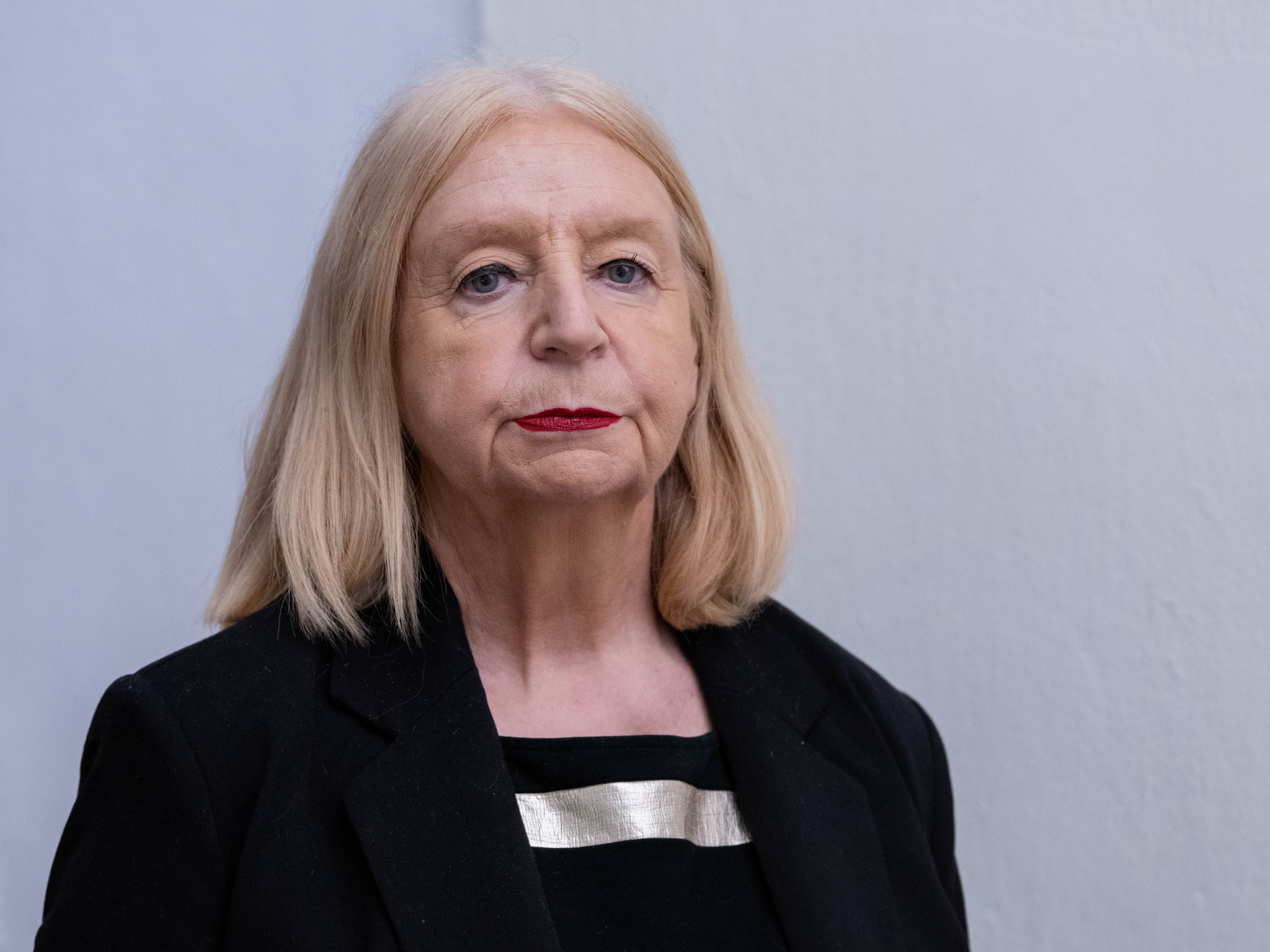
- Ewa Partum in 2026
- Born: 1945 (age 80–81); Grodzisk Mazowiecki
- Known for: conceptual art

Ewa Partum (born 1945, Grodzisk Mazowiecki near Warsaw, Poland) is a poetry artist, performance artist, filmmaker, mail artist, and conceptual artist.

== Education ==
Beginning in 1963, Partum studied at the State Higher School of Fine Arts in Łódź. She then went to the Academy of Fine Arts in Warsaw in 1965, where she studied in the painting department. She gained her diploma for her work with poetry as art, and she received her diploma in 1970.

== Major works ==
Partum engages in linguistic and performative play in an attempt to discover new artistic language. This search for a "new language" is rooted in her belief that painting has exhausted its potential to generate new or transformative ideas. Partum's work also is motivated by touching on issues such as the notion of public space, the situation of women, female subjectivity and the political context of the 1980s.

Partum's work explores issues of female identity, including the gender bias of the art world. At the beginning of the 1970s, while the amount of artist run institutions increased, there was also a development of a new paradigm that perpetuated the dominant, institutionalized model of art, which Partum considered confining. In interviews, she speaks about the difficulties and discrimination that she has faced as a female performance artist. This bias inspired her decision to perform naked in many pieces. At one point, Partum declared she would perform naked until women in the art world obtained equal rights. In interviews, she has spoken of the naked performances, saying "In their interpretations, many critics concentrate on the use of my naked body in my actions without actually understanding that for me it was a matter of creating a sign: a sign pointing into one direction. It was a tautological and not, as so many are inclined to believe, an egocentric strategy... My naked body is merely a tool. I'm very focused, not making any spontaneous movements. When the performance is finished I bow towards my audience as a virtuoso after a concert..."

Partum's public work began in 1969 and continued through the seventies, integrating poetry and performance. In a performance called Change, in 1974, Partum had a makeup artist work on half of her naked body in front of an audience. She announced that she was a work of art, making her body an element of the feminist discourse. This can be used as an example of essentialism, in that art is about the woman's body, and using the body as a canvas in feminist performance.

Another work, Self-Identification (1980), included photomontages of her naked figure superimposed against scenes of Warsaw, among pedestrians, next to a policewoman, and in front of the presidential place, showing the controversial nature of the naked female body. The piece's title speaks to the complicated and fraught search for a female identity in a world in which the female body is often observed as a source of shock or shame.

Partum's work often focuses on the harm of traditional gender biases and expectations. For example, in Stupid Woman (1981) she performed exaggerated compliance to norms of female submissiveness and stupidity by "kiss[ing] hands of members of the audience, pour[ing] alcohol over [her] head, writ[ing] with whipped cream on the floor 'sweet art' - in other words act[ing] like a drunk and stupid woman." In another work, Women, Marriage is Against You! (1980), she dressed in a wedding dress and wrapped herself in transparent foil, topped with a sign that said "For Men." Then, she cut through the dress and the foil, emerging naked.

Since 1971, she has been creating "Poems By Ewa," conceptual poetry in the shape of poetic objects in which she often imprints her lips. Early conceptual-poetic pieces include Active Poetry, in which Partum used the wind to scatter cut-out letters in a variety of landscapes, using their random distribution to create poetry. Her later poems compose of a strong feminist and social tone, although it is never stated in a clear or obvious way to the viewer. In one of Partum's performances during the period of martial law in 1982, she is naked and wearing red lipstick, and formed the word “Solidarnosc,” meaning solidarity, one by one with her lips on a piece of white paper. This expresses one of the themes of her work that includes parodying the manners in which women try to conform to men's idealized expectations of them. In an exhibition on the subject of the Berlin Wall, she photographs herself naked in high-heels, and holding up a big letter “O” in her right hand and a “W” in her left, signifying Ost-West Schatten, or east–west shadows.

Partum's films act both as documentation of her poetic and performative work and as explorations of film as a medium, in line with the structural cinema of the 1960s. For example, in Tautological Cinema (a series of short films made between 1973 and 1974), Partum examines the automated nature and materiality of film. The content of one piece, Ten Meters of Film, draws a simple correlation between film length and running time, denoting on the screen the number of meters of film that have run through the projector (up to ten). Another short film display the artist's face in a variety of scenes with at least one feature obscured. The film calls into question the ability of the artist to fully communicate an idea, arguing that once the work is observed by another, the authority of the artist is lost. Of the films and of film as a medium, Partum as said, "It’s not dealing with aesthetics. It’s rather a new sort of philosophical practice that operates in the area in which the relation between the film image and the camerawork covers the whole interest in the film itself.”

Partum also worked as the organizer and curator of a very influential mail art gallery from 1971 through 1977. The gallery, Galeria Adres, displayed the work of Fluxus artists, and others. Partum described the gallery as "a place, a situation, an opportunity, an offer, for information, proposition, documentation, speculation, provocation, exposition". As part of the gallery, Partum additionally published catalogs and books.

Throughout the 1960s and 1970s, Partum's work was often affected by Polish censors, who refused to allows its distribution in publications.

== Exhibitions ==
In July 2013, the Frac Lorraine in Metz, Francep held an exhibition entitled, “Bad Girls: A Collection in Action”, honoring female artists who dedicated their work to deconstructing established order and creating room for freedom, experience, and life, changing the audience's vision of the future and encouraging social change.

Several retrospectives of Partum's work have occurred, including Ewa Partum: The Legality of Space at the Wyspa Institute of Art (2006). In interviews, Partum has celebrated the work of retrospective exhibitions, in that they allow the audience and critics to "trace the genealogy of the artist's language."

Exhibitions of her work include:

- W.O.R.K.S., Conceptual Graphics "Reading of Our World" in Calgary, Canada in 1973
- Prospectiva 74 in São Paulo in 1974; International Exhibition of Mail Art ‘75 in Buenos Aires in 1975
- The Film Festival "Film as Film - Film as Art" in Lodz in 1977
- Quatro in Milan in 1982; Contemporary Polish Art in Berlin in 1984
- Polska 86, an exhibition of 20th century Polish photography
- Black-and-White Poland in Paris in 1990
- Jestesmy at Zacheta National Gallery of Art in Warsaw in 1991
- WACK! Art in the Feminist Revolution at MoCA, 2007
- For a Special Place: Documents and Works from the Generali Foundation Collection at the Austrian Cultural Forum, 2007
