= Voldemārs Matvejs =

Latvian artist and art theorist

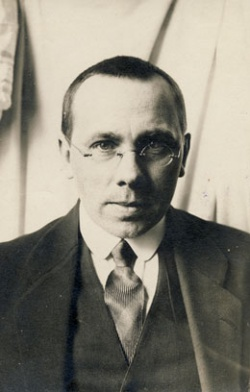
Voldemārs Matvejs c. 1912

Voldemārs Matvejs (1877–1914) was a Latvian artist and art theorist. Despite dying in 1914, he was to have a significant impact on the development of Soviet art. Nikolay Punin remarked: "If he had not died so early he would have been the first among us: he knew what was necessary for art better than the others: he saw and understood better than the rest." He was one of the founders of the Union of Youth in 1908.

He had a particular interest in African art and his writing in this area has been compared with that of Carl Einstein.

== Faktura ==
Matvejs was the art theorist who pioneered the concept of Faktura.

== Gallery ==
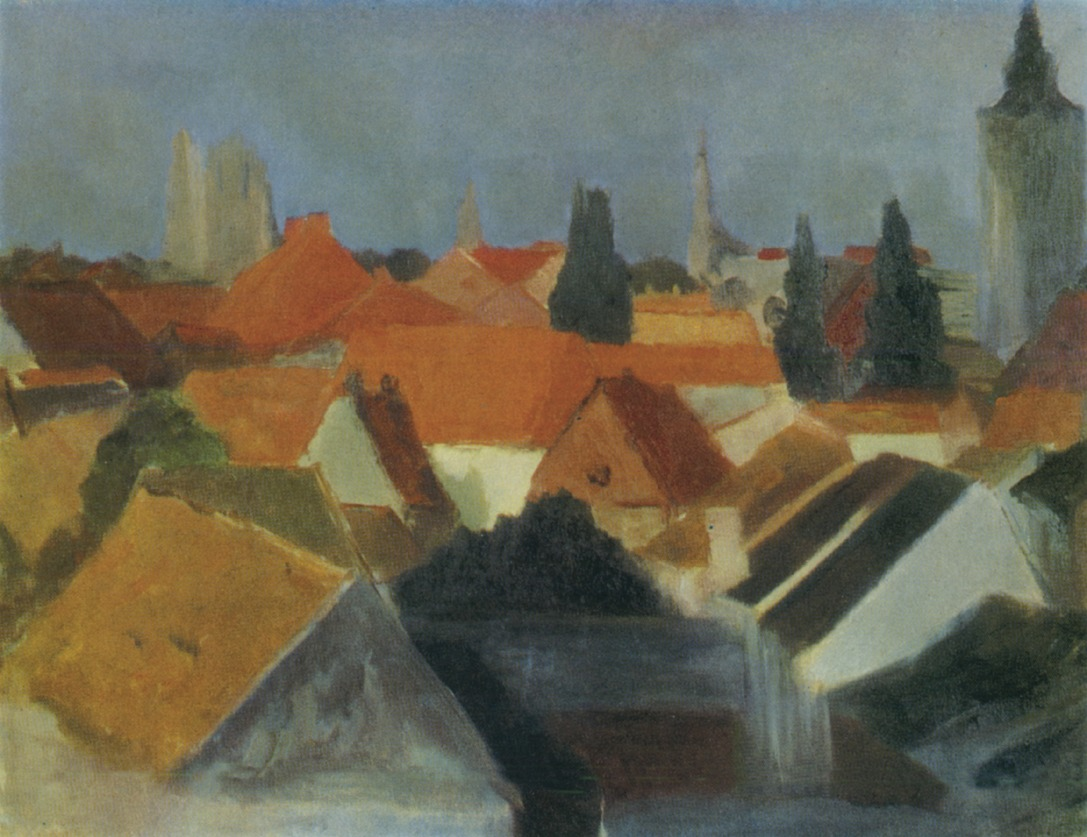
Red Roofs, Visby (ca. 1909)

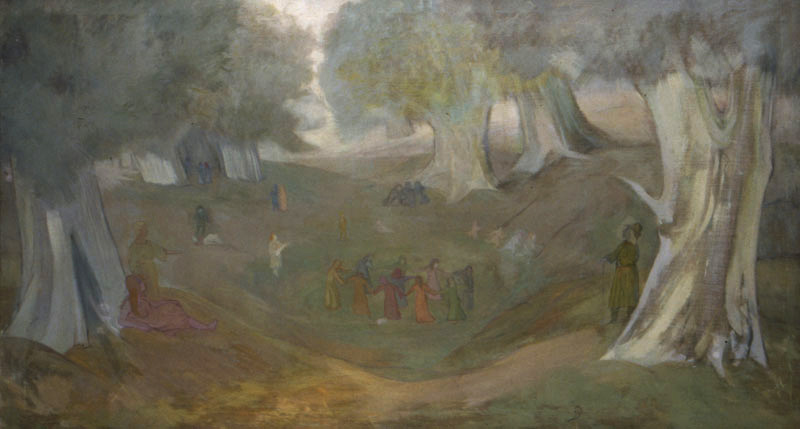
Ancient Times (ca. 1910)

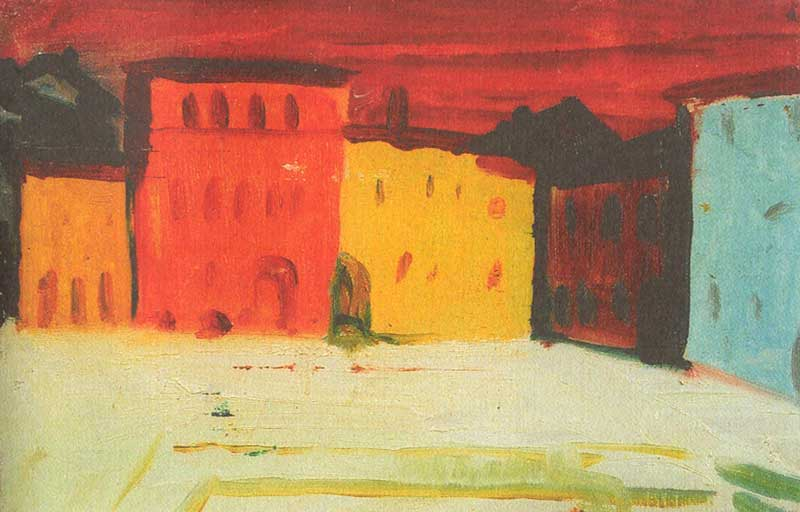
Yellow Square (1911)

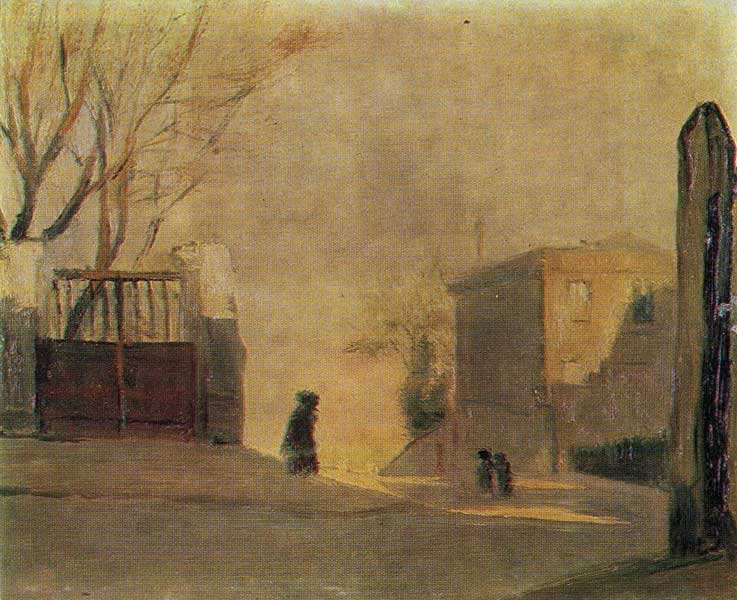
View of Paris (1912)

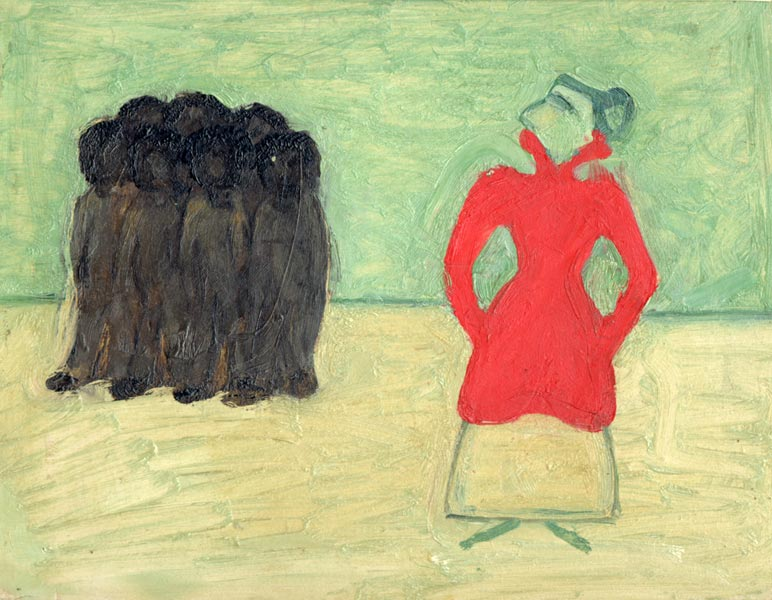
Red and Black (1913)
