= Henryk Berlewi =

Polish-French painter, graphic designer and art theorist

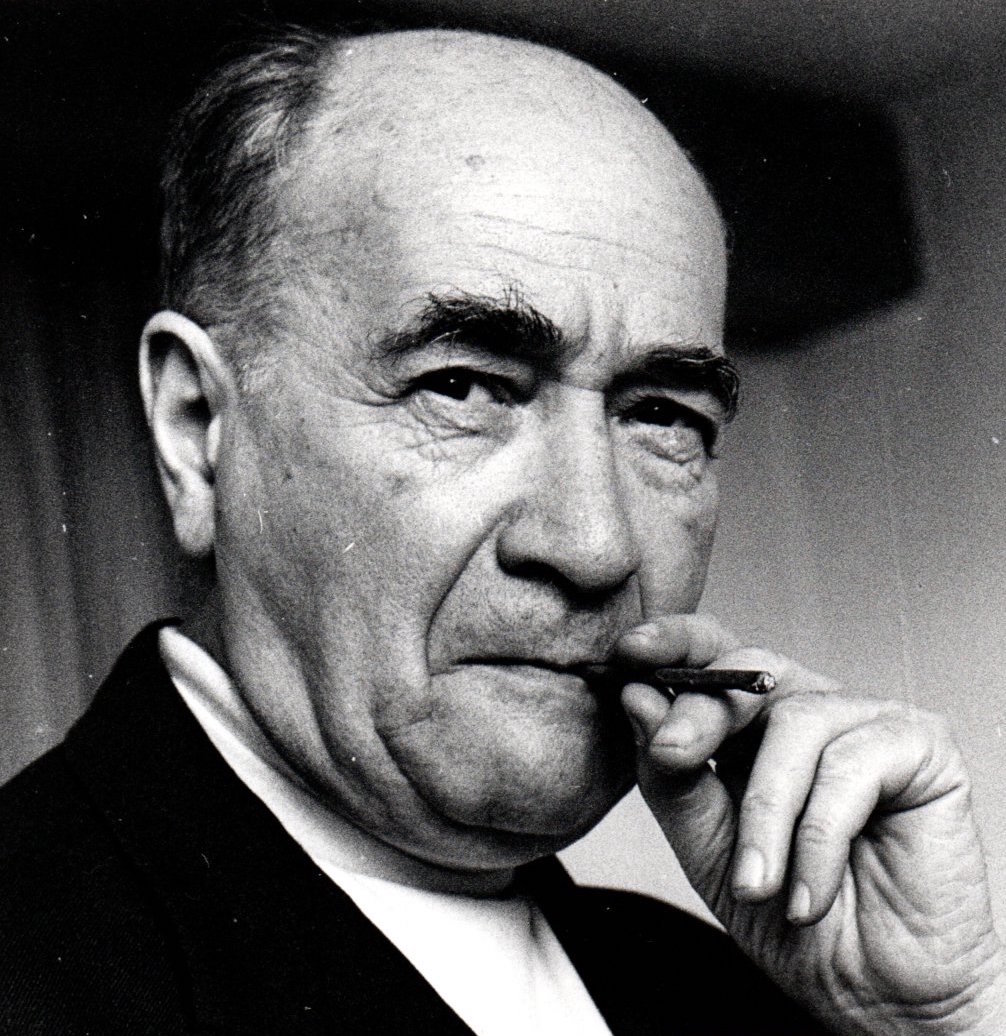
- A photograph of Henryk Berlewi in Berlin by Helmutz Lortz (1962)
- Born: October 20, 1894; Warsaw, Poland
- Died: August 2, 1967 (aged 72); Paris, France
- Education: Warsaw Academy of Fine Arts, École des Beaux-Arts, École des Arts Décoratifs
- Movement: Constructivism

Henryk Berlewi (Yiddish: הענריק בערלעװי; October 20, 1894 – August 2, 1967) was a Polish-French painter, graphic designer and art theorist, who is primarily remembered as an abstract artist who paved the way for optical art, but he was also an important figure in Yiddish book design and typography in the early 1920s. He drew portraits of many Jewish writers and artists, among them Uri Zvi Greenberg.

== Life and work ==
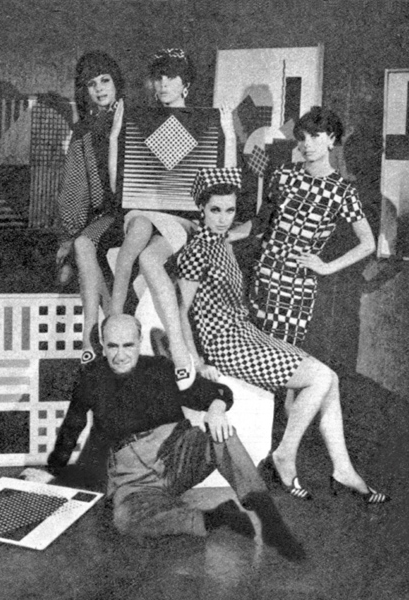
Henryk Berlewi, surrounded by models in op-art clothing, 1966 (Photograph by Edward Hartwig

Berlewi was born in Warsaw to an assimilated Polish Jewish family. He studied art in Antwerp and Paris, and was active in Polish art circles. Supported by his mother Helena, who would also later become an artist, Berlewi studied fine art in Warsaw (1904–1909), Antwerp (1909–1910), and Paris (1911–1912), returning to Warsaw in 1913 to study at the school of design. During World War I he discovered Futurism and Dada, and in 1918 he met the futurist Aleksander Wat and the formist Anatol Stern, fellow Jews whose Polish language verse he later illustrated. In 1918-1922 Berlewi focused on Jewish themes.

In 1920 Berlewi attended El Lissitzky's lecture in Warsaw, motivating him to move to Berlin, where in 1922–1923 he abandoned figurative art for pure constructivist abstraction. In 1922 he participated in the Novembergruppe exhibition. Along with Jankel Adler he was chosen to represent Jewish artists from Eastern Europe at the International Congress of Progressive Artists, where he met El Lissitzky, Viking Eggeling (to whom Berlewi devoted an article published in 'Albatross' in 1922), László Moholy-Nagy, Theo van Doesburg, Gerhard Richter, Laszlo Peri and Ludwig Mies van der Rohe. In May-Sep 1923 he presented his first Mechano-Faktura compositions in the Novembergruppe section of the Grosse Berliner Kunstaustellung.

In November 1923 Berlewi returned to Warsaw, where with Władysław Strzemiński he founded the constructivist group Blok. In his review of the exhibition which accompanied the International Congress of Progressive Artists, published in Nasz Kurier, he stated that Expressionism was obsolete and was replaced by Novembergruppe's Dada and by constructivism. In March 1924 Berlewi published his theoretical tract (in progress since 1922) Mechano-Faktura, using mechanical means to create texture, prefaced by the writer Aleksander Wat. Its basic premise rejects the illusion of space in favor of two-dimensionality; color is reduced to black, white, and red, and visual equivalents of images are accomplished by mechanical means using rhythmic arrangements of lines and simple geometrical forms such as circles and squares. Along with the publication he organises the first mechanofaktura exhibition at the Austro-Daimler Automobile Salon.

In summer 1924 Berlewi was invited by Herwarth Walden, founder of the Der Sturm magazine and gallery to exhibit his mechanofaktura works in Berlin; the German version of his manifesto was published. Later in 1924 he founded the Reklama-Mechano advertising agency with Wat and Stanisław Brucz, which obtained a contract for the Plutos chocolate brochure. In 1926 Berlewi quit his research and returned to figurative art, working as a set designer. In 1928 he settled in Paris along with other Polish and Jewish artists. In 1928-1938 he traveled through Belgium and made a few portraits of the political and literary world until he learned that he was seriously ill and stopped working.

In 1942 Berlewi left Paris for Nice, and in 1943-1944 joined the French Resistance. In 1947 he returned to painting. Wanting to "reintroduce the object", he created still lives inspired by the French masters of the 17th century. Rediscovered by a French critic, Berlewi took part in a major Paris show, Precursors of Abstract Art in Poland (1957). Suddenly appreciated again, he held one-man shows in Berlin (1963, 1964), Paris (1965), and Warsaw (1966). After his death more shows were held in Zurich (1974) and New York (1976, 1978). He died in Paris.
