= Alina Szapocznikow =

Polish sculptor

- Born: 16 May 1926; Kalisz, Poland
- Died: 2 March 1973 (aged 46); Praz-Coutant, Passy, France
- Resting place: Montmartre Cemetery, Paris
- Education: Ecole nationale Supérieure des Beaux-Arts, Paris
- Known for: Sculpture, drawing
- Spouses: Ryszard Stanisławski, Roman Cieślewicz

Alina Szapocznikow (Polish: [ʂapɔt͡ʂˈɲikɔf]; 16 May 1926 – 2 March 1973) was a Polish artist and Holocaust survivor. Recognized as one of the most important Polish sculptors of the post-war era, Szapocznikow utilized diverse and experimental mediums to investigate and examine the human form, recalling genres such as surrealism, nouveau realism, and pop art.

Born in 1926 in Kalisz, Poland, into a Jewish family, she grew up in Pabianice near Łódź. Her childhood was disrupted by the outbreak of World War II. Szapocznikow was later imprisoned in the Nazi concentration camps at Auschwitz and Bergen-Belsen before being transferred to Terezin in 1943. After the end of the war in 1945, Szapocznikow moved to Prague, where she began her formal training in sculpture. Her education continued at the École nationale supérieure des Beaux-Arts in Paris, under Paul Niclausse. During the late 1940s and early 1950s, she moved between Prague and Paris, and later became ill with peritoneal tuberculosis.

In 1952, Szapocznikow married Polish art historian Ryszard Stanisławski, but the marriage ended in 1958. She participated in numerous competitions for public monuments conforming to the doctrine of Socialist Realism in Soviet-aligned Poland. After the Khrushchev Thaw, Szapocznikow returned to avant-garde works, focusing on the subject of her own body, a theme that would remain central to her work throughout the rest of her artistic career. In 1962, she was offered a solo show at the Venice Biennale and moved to Paris in 1963, where she became friends with Pierre Restany and experimented with innovative materials and techniques in sculpture. Szapocznikow died in March 1973 of bone cancer. After the fall of communism in Poland, her work gained recognition domestically and abroad, including a major retrospective at the Museum of Modern Art in New York in 2013.

== Biography ==
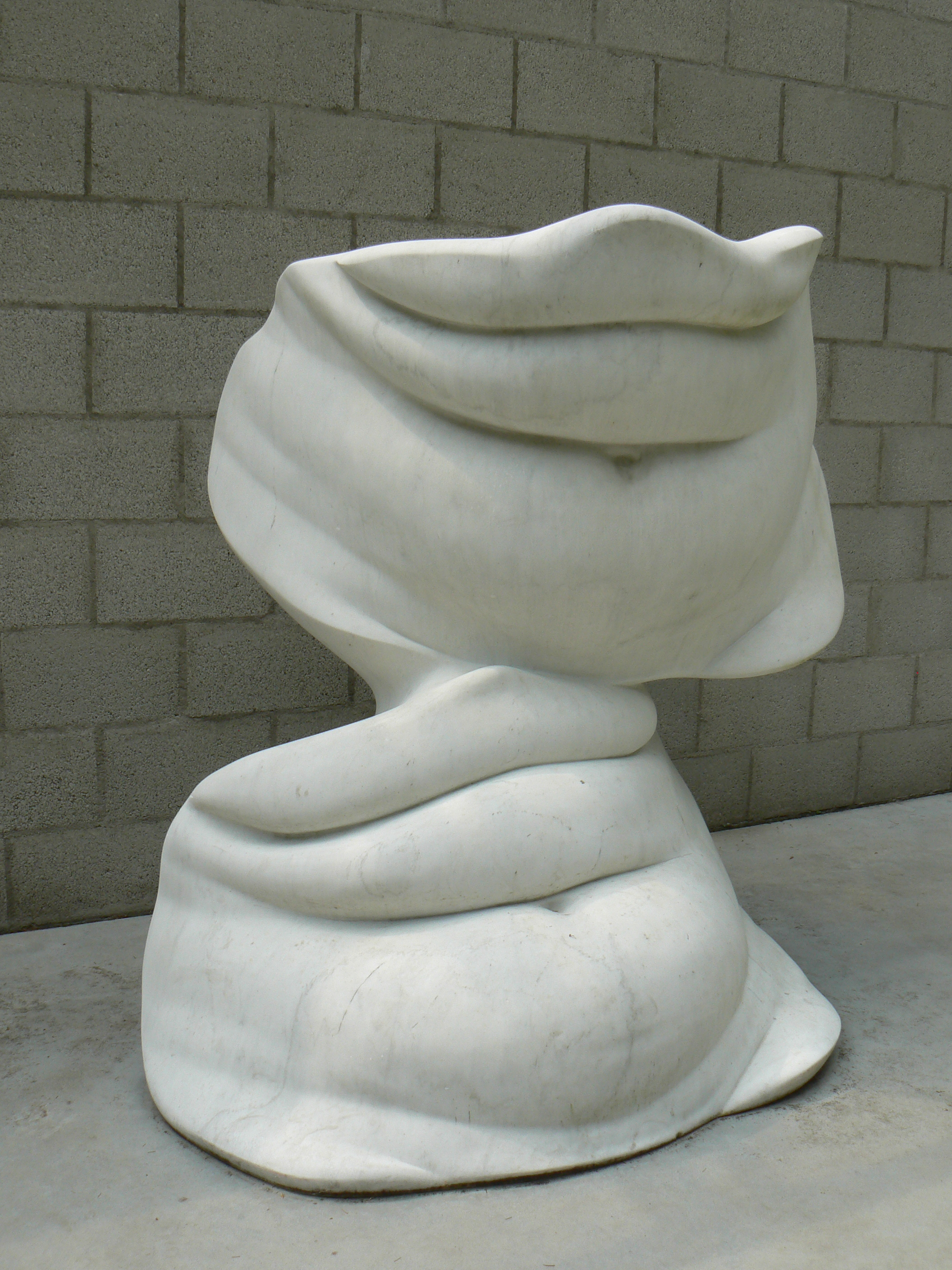
Alina Szapocznikow Grands Ventres, 1968, in the Kröller-Müller Museum.

=== Early life (1926–38) ===
Szapocznikow was born in Kalisz in 1926 to a Jewish family (mother, father, and one younger brother). Her father, Jakub, was a dentist and her mother, Ryfka "Regina" Auerbach, was a pediatrician. Her family lived in Pabianice near Łódź. During these years, Szapocznikow attended a small Polish elementary school in Pabiance New Town and a State High School of St. Hedwig in Putawskiego St. Her father died from tuberculosis in 1938 right before the war broke out.

=== Life during World War II (1939–45) ===
As a thirteen year old, Szapocznikow was soon left all alone with her mother, as her brother went missing shortly after the start of the war. Once they were relocated to the ghetto in Pabianice, they spent two years (February 1940 to May 1942) at the ghetto employed in the hospital – her mother as a doctor and Alina as a nurse. The familial pair continued to work as a doctor and nurse when they were moved to the Łódź ghettos at the end of May before being shipped even farther. They passed through Auschwitz on their way to the concentration camp in Bergen-Belsen.

Szapocznikow and her mother stayed at the camp for a total of 10 months, before being moved from the camp. According to documentation from their stay, the change in internment in autumn of 1943 was due to Szapocznikow's mother's scolding of a German doctor who "did not acquit himself well of his duties." By autumn 1943, the familial pair was moved to Terezin where they stayed together for one more year before ultimately being separated. The artist's experiences during the end of the war are unknown. After the war, Szapocnikow headed to Prague with a group of prisoners while her mother returned to Łódź.

Alina Szapocznikow barely spoke of her war experiences during the entirety of her life. However, there are letter fragments of correspondences with her first husband, Ryszard Stanisławski that mention her war experience:

"But the difference is that in the process of your formation in the last 10 years you have not gone through that baptism of despair, all these things, everything didn't end for you irretrievably several times as it did for me in the ghettos and the camps. I'm sorry, Rys, I am embarrassed. You know how much I hate, how ashamed I am for those people who go on or "brag" about the years of torment they have lived through."

=== Late life (1945-1973) ===
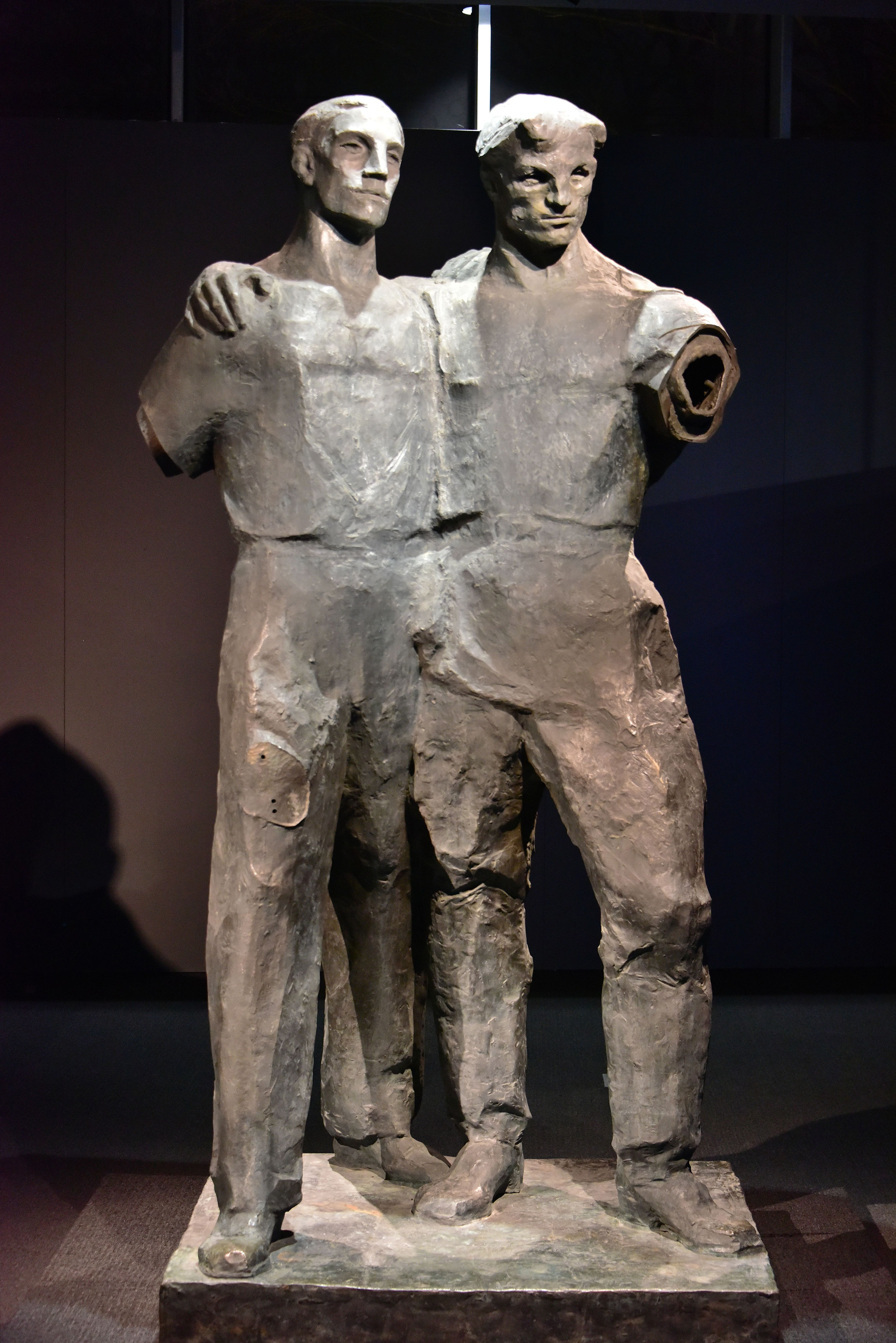
Friendship, a socialist realism sculpture by Szapocznikow, 1953–1954

Alina Szapocznikow, once in Prague, decided to study the art of sculpture. She trained as a sculptor in Otokar Velimsky's studio in Prague from 1945 to 1946. In 1947 she studied at the Academy of Art and Industry in Prague under the tutelage of Josef Wagner, after which she attended Paul Niclausse's atelier at the École nationale supérieure des Beaux-Arts in Paris. During her time in Paris, she was introduced to the Polish community where she met her first husband, Ryszard Stanisławski, a Polish art historian, and the director of the Museum of Modern Art in Łódź. The artistic life of France was important in Szapocznikow's development as an artist – she was given the freedom to establish the fundamentals of sculpture. The artist was exposed to and inspired by the works of Jean Arp, Ossip Zadkine, Henry Moore and Alberto Giacometti.

Between the years 1947–1949, Szapocznikow traveled back and forth between Prague and Paris for a time. In 1951, she was afflicted with a sudden illness. She was diagnosed with peritoneal tuberculosis, which was not treatable at the time. Under the recommendation of her doctor, she traveled to Sirod in the Jura Mountains, before a relapse caused her to go to a private hospital in Champagnole. After consulting her doctor, Szapocznikow allowed for the use of an experimental antibiotic (Streptomycin) which assisted in her recovery. She returned to Poland, where she married Stanisławski July 1952 and that same summer they adopted a son named Piotr. The artist took part in numerous competitions to create public monuments to Chopin, Polish-Soviet friendship, Warsaw heroes, the victims of Auschwitz, and Juliusz Słowacki. Szapocznikow and Stanisławski only stayed together for 6 years, before divorcing the summer of 1958, though they remained close for the rest of their lives. She became romantically involved with Polish graphic designer Roman Cieślewicz. They married 1967 in Paris.

In 1962, Szapocznikow was offered a solo show in the Polish Pavilion at the Venice Biennale. The following year she moved to Paris where she became friends with the art critic and founder of the Nouveau Réalisme movement, Pierre Restany. Back in Paris, Szapocznikow started to produce casts of her breasts, stomach, and legs. Working mainly in bronze and stone, Szapocznikow's early artistic production constitutes the first materially documented trace of her own embodiment. In 1963, the artist began to combine fragmented body parts with revolutionary sculpting materials including polyester and polyurethane. Such technical innovation allowed Szapocznikow to immortalize a personal language informed by her exposure to death in childhood, traumatic memories of the Holocaust, as well as witnessing the premature collapse of her own body due to tuberculosis.

=== Death ===
In 1968, the artist was diagnosed with breast cancer. Much of her work after her diagnosis, revolved around her inevitable death and the traumas she endured throughout her life. That same year Szapocznikow started making her "tumor" sculptures using resin, gauze, crumpled newspapers and photographs. Through casts of the human body, the artist intended to preserve the impermanence of the body as a source of pain, trauma and truth. Her choice of using photographs of herself and of friends in forms of synthetic resin calls upon the processes of sculpture and photography as grave diggers and carriers of melancholy. One of the last works that Szapocznikow worked on was a purely conceptual project. Encouraged by Pierre Restany, she explored a design that would celebrate and beautify the region of Vesuvius. A paradoxical production, it involved not the crown of Vesuvius but the inside of the crater itself. There was to be a skating rink – inviting skaters to waltz to On the Hills of Manchuria, lighting, ski-lifts, and artificial snow. The design can be described as "the gesture of someone who, in challenging nature, subjugates and enchants it" and the "triviality and the playful character of that gesture." The artist herself comments on the inevitability of the end with the conceptual project:

"If one day during a figure skating competition some Peggy Fleming of the time executes her program in the frozen crater and if we, the spectators, amazed by her wonderful and frivolous pirouettes, are surprised by a sudden eruption of lava and become petrified for ever, like the inhabitants of Pompeii, then the triumph of the moment and of the force of transition will be complete. And such a fleeting moment and such a transitory instant are the only symbol of our earthy passage."

Alina Szapocznikow died on 2 March 1973 in Praz-Coutant due to the last phase of her illness, bone cancer and advancing paralysis.

=== Reception ===
After the artist's death, Alina Szapocznikow's work was organized into a number of shows. In 1975, the posthumous reception of her work reached its peak where her work was shown extensively throughout Poland, lengthy articles and essays were also written. In the late 1970s and 80s, her work was shown in group exhibitions, but not in many solo exhibitions. In recent years, Alina Szapocznikow has been "rediscovered" by the public and major museums have organized shows including the Museum of Modern Art in New York.

== Notable works ==
=== War ===
Throughout her career, Szapocznikow explored the fragmented human body through sculptures of bronze and later used modern plastic materials including polyester, polyurethane, and wiring. Influenced by her experiences as a Polish Jewish woman during World War II, she uses the distorted, decaying, and fragmented human body as a witness to wartime experiences, ultimately criticizing the valorization of labor and militarism. Exhumed, from 1955, is a portrayal of the body after war with a pitted surface texture and hollowed torso. The work evokes heroic Herculean figures and victims of the 79 CE Eruption of Mount Vesuvius in Pompeii, further driving the idea that valorized bodies are not immune to the impact of war.

=== Human body ===
Alina Szapocznikow is known for her sculptures of the fragmented female. Created in 1956, Difficult Age is constructed of patinated plaster—a delicate medium for sculpture—that can be interpreted as a metaphor for the fragility and impermanence of youth and beauty.

After being diagnosed with breast cancer, Alina Szapocznikow began her Tumors Personified series experimenting with polyester resin and polyurethane—a new use of materials which most artists had not utilized at this time. She abstracts feminine sensuality in Illuminated Lips, Marching Lips, and Illuminated Breast among others from 1966 on, which transforms female body parts into utilitarian objects and changes their function. Her male contemporaries (e.g., César Baldaccini, Arman) had exhausted this notion of the mechanized body, but Szapocznikow's functional household objects maintain a strange sensuality.

One of her most recognized and well known works is Grands Ventres (Big Bellies) which depicts two large bellies stacked on top of each other, each around five feet tall. Compared to her other works regarding the body, these are very realistic and soothing to look at. Many of her other works have been regarded as impolite and are not what one might call "tasteful".

=== Bird ===
In 1959 Alina Szapocznikow created the sculpture Bird in her studio in Warsaw. Bird was part of a series of abstract works that Szapocznikow created in 1958–1960 that were characterized by their inverted center of gravity and their organic and distinctive expressive forms resembling shapes in nature.

Bird is made from cement and metal, exceptionally heavy materials for its dimensions—the sculpture stands 166 cm tall. With the bird's neck and beak pointing straight upwards to the sky and its wings drawn together, the sculpture suggests the tension in the animal's body during the precise moment of departing from earth, no longer fully on the ground but not yet in the sky.

There are several photographs of Szapocznikow with Bird, including one made by Tadeusz Rolke.

The sculpture was last exhibited at Polish Painting and Sculpture in 1961 at the Gres Gallery in Washington, D.C., and was considered lost for over 50 years until it was rediscovered in the outhouse of an art collector in upstate New York. When Bird was sold at an auction in April 2016 it broke the record for the most expensive Polish sculpture. This work was shown to the public for the first time in 56 years at The Hepworth Wakefield art gallery.

== Exhibitions (solo and two-person) ==
- 1960 – 2nd Exhibition of the Sculptures of Alina Szapocznikow at BWA Arsenał, Poznań, Poland
- 1960 – Alina Szapocznikow (Drawings) at Farsettiarte, Prato, Italy
- 1960 – Alina Szapocznikow Confrontations at Galeria Krzywe Koło, Warsaw, Poland
- 1960 – Sculptures of Alina Szapocznikow at 13th Festival of Fine Arts, BWA Gallery, Sopot, Poland
- 1961 – Alina Szapocznikow (along with Roman Cieślewicz) at Gallery of Fine Arts, Rijeka, Yugoslavia
- 1961 – Alina Szapocznikow at Kordegarda Gallery, Warsaw, Poland
- 1962 – Alina Szapocznikow at 31st Biennale, Venice, Italy
- 1967 – Alina Szapocznikow at Florence Houston Brown Gallery, Paris, France
- 1967 – Sculptures of Alina Szapocznikow at Zachęta National Gallery of Art, Warsaw, Poland
- 1968 – Alina Szapocznikow at Cogeime Gallery, Brussels, Belgium
- 1969 – Outdoor show at Port-Barcarès, France
- 1970 – Envahissement de Tumeurs (Invasion of Tumors) at Stedelijk Museum, Amsterdam, Netherlands
- 1971 – Instant et Chose at Aurora Gallery, Geneva, Switzerland
- 1973 – Alina Szapocznikow – Tumeurs, Herbier at City of Paris' Museum of Modern Art, Paris, France
- 1974 – Alina Szapocznikow (Drawings) at Museum of Modern Art, Warsaw, Poland
- 1975 – Alina Szpocznikow (Drawings) at Aurora Gallery, Geneva, Switzerland
- 1975 – Retrospective Exhibition of Alina Szapocznikow: 1926–1973 at Museum Sztuki, Łódź, Poland
- 1976 – Untitled show at Municipal Gallery Arsenal, Poznań, Poland
- 1976 – Untitled show at Pałac Sztuki i Galeria Pryzmat (Palace of Art), Kraków, Poland
- 1976 – Untitled show at Municipal Art Gallery of Bydgoszcz, Bydgoszcz, Poland
- 1976 – Untitled show at National Museum, Gdańsk, Poland
- 1977 – Untitled show at Municipal Art Gallery of Białystok, Białystok, Poland
- 1978 – Untitled show at Regional Museum of the Kalisz, Kalisz, Poland
- 1978 – Alina Szapocznikow PhotoSculptures at Salon Krytyków, BWA, Lublin, Poland
- 1989 – Alina Szapocznikow: 1926–1973 at Galeria Sztuki Sceny Plastycznej KUL, Lublin, Poland
- 1990 – Alina Szapocznikow: 1926–1973 at Polish Library, Paris, France
- 1998 – Alina Szapocznikow: 1926–1973 at Zachęta National Gallery of Art, Warsaw, Poland
- 1998 – Alina Szapocznikow: 1926–1973 at National Museum, Kraków, Poland
- 1999 – Alina Szapocznikow: 1926–1973 at Museum Sztuki, Łódź, Poland
- 1999 – Alina Szapocznikow: 1926–1973 at National Museum, Wrocław, Poland
- 2000 – Alina Szapocznikow at Czech Museum of Art, Prague, Czech Republic
- 2010 – Out of My Mouth: Chewing Gum Sculptures The Photosculptures of Alina Szapocznikow at the Henry Moore Institute, Leeds
- 2012 – Alina Szapocznikow: Sculpture, Undone, 1955–1972, at The Museum of Modern Art, New York and at The Hammer Museum, Los Angeles
- 2013 – Alina Szapocznikow: Du dessin à la sculpture, at Musée National d'Art Moderne, Centre Pompidou, Paris
- 2015 – Them at Schinkel Pavillon, Berlin, Germany
- 2015 – Alina Szapocznikow at Andrea Rosen Gallery, New York
- 2017 – Alina Szapocznikow: Human Landscapes, at The Hepworth Wakefield, England

== See also ==
- List of Polish sculptors
