= Museum of Art, Łódź =

Museum of Art in Łódź
- Muzeum Sztuki

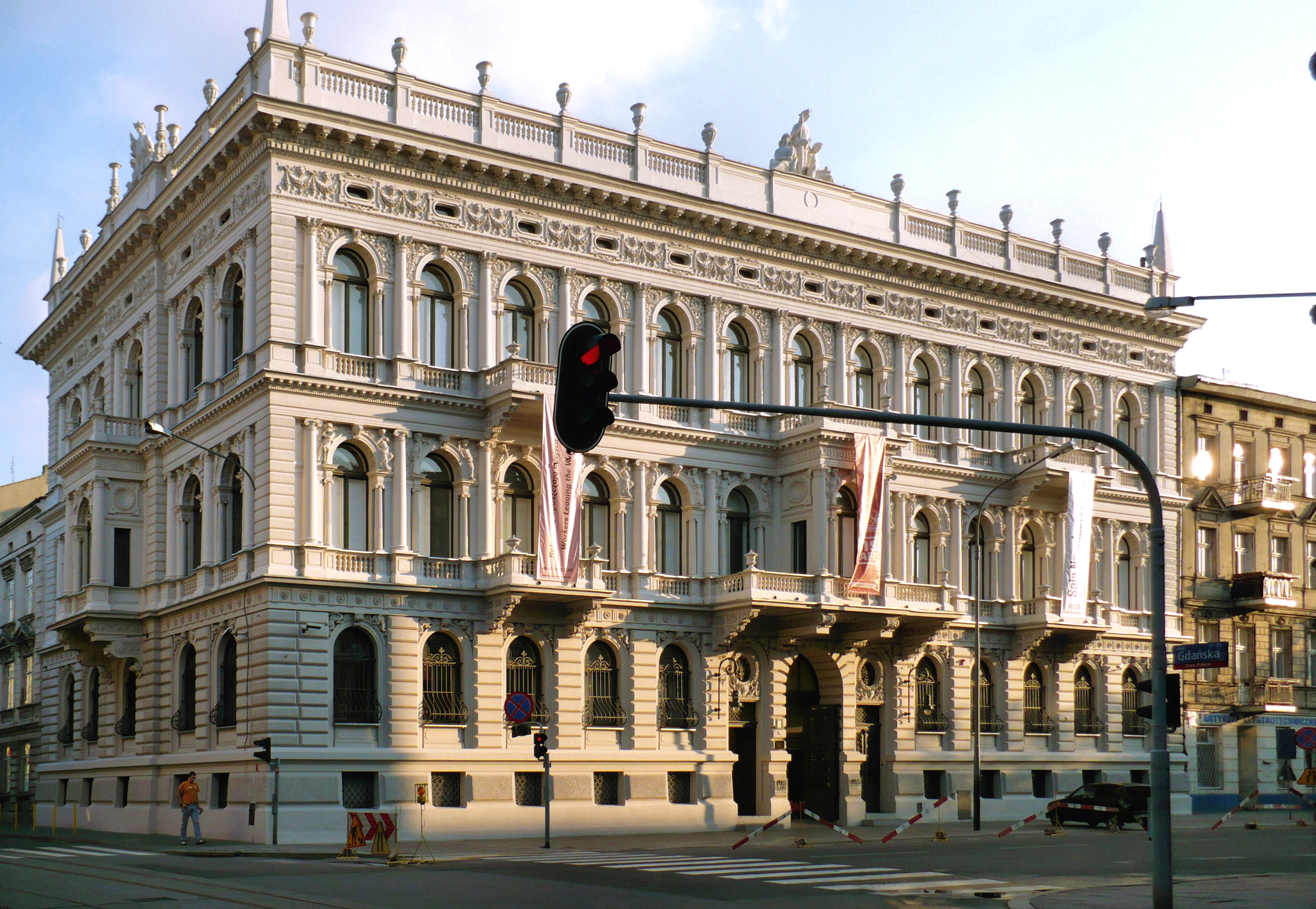
- Maurycy Poznański's Palace, the primary ms^{1} branch

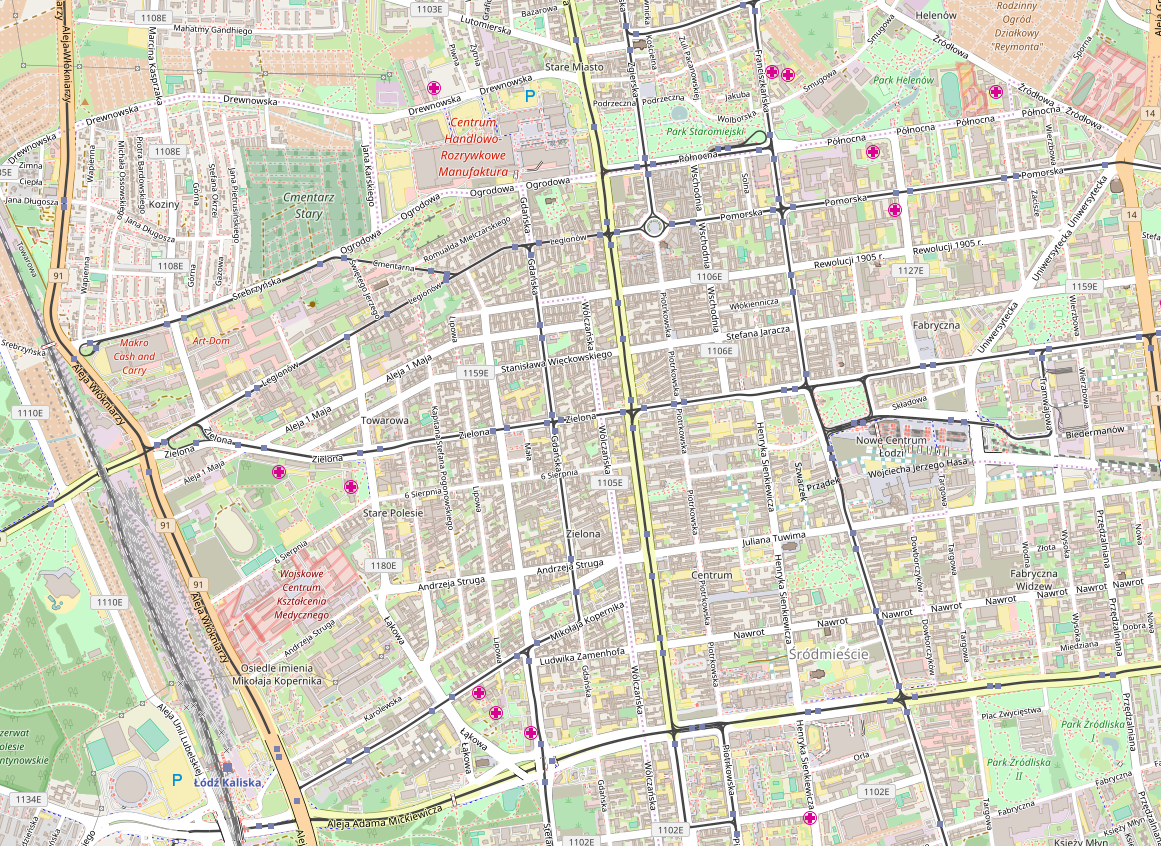
- Location within the city of Łódź
- Interactive fullscreen map
- Established: April 13, 1930
- Coordinates: 51°46′18″N 19°26′54″E
- Type: Art museum
- Collection size: Modern art, Contemporary art, Avant-garde art
- Director: Daniel Muzyczuk
- Website: msl.org.pl

Muzeum Sztuki, or the Museum of Art in Łódź, is a museum of modern and contemporary art in Łódź, Poland, whose main goal is to research and display the history of avant-garde art, with a focus on Central and Eastern Europe. Founded in 1931, Muzeum Sztuki became the first museum in Europe and the second in the world (after The Museum of Modern Art in New York) dedicated to collecting and showcasing modern art.

The museum opened to the public on 15 February 1931 as the International Collection of Modern Art. The founders were Polish artists associated with the a.r. group, among them Władysław Strzemiński, Katarzyna Kobro and Henryk Stażewski. The early collection encompassed a diverse range of avant-garde styles such as Cubism, Futurism, Dada, Surrealism, Formism, and Unism. The museum's early years in the 1930s saw expansion under director Marian Minich, enriching the collection with Polish modern art. Following the end of World War II and the imposition of Stalinism in Poland, the museum remained under Minich's directorship and moved to the Poznański family palace in 1948. The same year, the Neoplastic Room, an experimental exhibition space designed to display avant-garde art, was opened at the museum. The institution was nationalized and the museum's name changed to Muzeum Sztuki in 1950.

During the 1950s, in the wake of the Khrushchev Thaw, the museum returned to a more robust international program, collaborating with Western gallerists and artists such as Denise René and Michel Seuphor, among others. This approach developed further under the directorship of Ryszard Stanisławski who led the institution between 1966 and 1990. Notable contributions included a donation of selected works by the German artist Joseph Beuys in 1981 and an artistic exchange with the Museum of Contemporary Art, Los Angeles organized in 1982. The museum later acquired the Edward Herbst Palace and planned for new developments in the former Izrael Poznański factory. Currently, the institution consists of three branches: ms^{1}, ms^{2} and Herbst Palace Museum (Polish: Muzeum Pałac Herbsta). In 1998 Muzeum Sztuki in Łódź was entered into the Polish National Register of Museums under number 53.

== Mission ==
Muzeum Sztuki in Łódź is primarily focused on studying and displaying the collection of 20th and 21st century art in a variety of contexts, as well as on providing progressive artistic interventions and enhancing the role of art as element of social life, e.g., through educational activities.

Its programme coincides with avant-garde project worked out at the turn of the 1920s and 1930s by the “a.r.” group or, more precisely, by Władysław Strzemiński, Katarzyna Kobro and Henryk Stażewski) and with the idea developed by Ryszard Stanisławski (Muzeum's director in 1966–1992) of a “museum as a critical instrument”. These ideas are further expanded in the assumption, according to which a museum is capable of re-defining and updating notions pertaining to art and culture and establishing social relations with the involvement of art. Through exhibition, research, educational and publishing programme, the Muzeum strives to practice the idea of art as a way to experience, feel and understand the reality, which was a part of avant-garde dream of creative life available to all.

== History of the collection ==
=== 1920s – the "a.r" collection ===
Muzeum Sztuki was established as a result of reorganisation of Łódź museums in 1930. The core of its collection is based on works of modern art collected in Poland and abroad by the a.r. group in the period 1929–1932 and supplemented until 1938. The initiator and the main driving force behind the action of collecting the donations from artists was a painter and art theoretician Władysław Strzemiński, actively supported by Katarzyna Kobro – a sculptor, Henryk Stażewski – painter, as well as Jan Brzękowski and Julian Przyboś – poets.

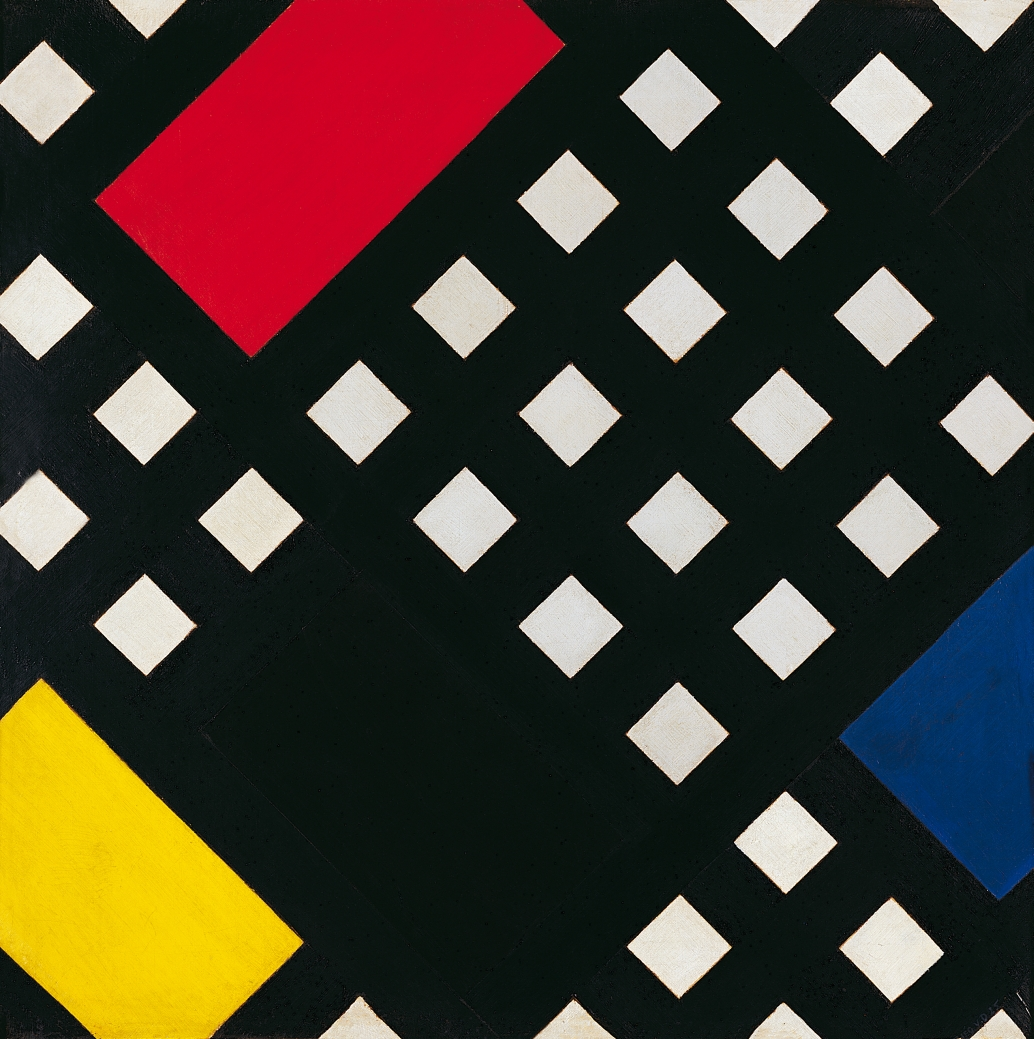
Theo van Doesburg, Counter-composition XV, collection of the Museum of Art in Łódź

The Collection in its ideological dimension reflects Strzemiński's artistic preferences, although its final shape was the product of the activities of many people, including Henryk Stażewski, Hans Arp and Michel Seuphor. It presents an overview of avant-garde strands and tendencies of the late 1920s and includes masterpieces of Abstractionists, such as Hans Arp and SophieTaeuber-Arp, Theo van Doesburg, Jean Gorin, Jean Helion, Vilmos Huszar, Henryk Stażewski or Georges Vantongerloo. The collection also includes artworks of artists representing Cubism (e.g., Fernand Léger, Louis Marcoussis), Futurism (Enrico Prampolini), Dada (Kurt Schwitters), Surrealism (Max Ernst, Kurt Seligmann), Formism (e.g., Leon Chwistek, Tytus Czyżewski), “pure form” (Stanisław Ignacy Witkiewicz) or Unism (Władysław Strzemiński). The collection was initiated by the artists and took shape as a result of their solidarity-based international initiative to donate works against any artistic divisions.

=== 1930s ===
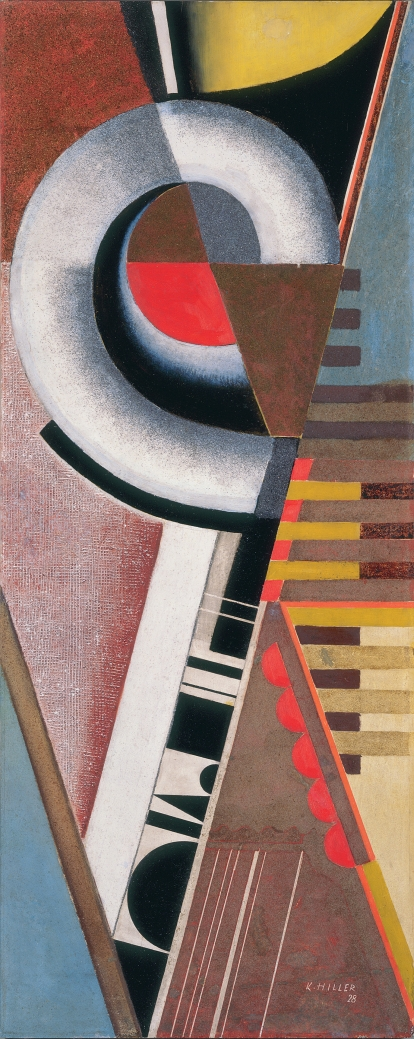
Karol Hiller, Board with Spiral

Originally, the museum was housed on the first floor of the former town hall at Liberty Square (Plac Wolności) 1 and its full name read “The J. and K. Bartoszewicz Municipal Museum of History and Art” (named after Kazimierz Bartoszewicz, who donated his family collection of art to the city in the period 1928–1930). The first exhibition opened on 13 April 1930 and this date is considered to mark the beginnings of what is today Muzeum Sztuki in Łódź. Avant-garde art from the collection of "a.r" group was made available to the public on 15 February 1931. In 1935 Dr. Marian Minich was appointed the director of the museum and already in the initial years he expanded the collection with works that have complemented the picture of Polish modern art with Polish Formists, the Lviv group of surrealists Artes, and representative works of Jankel Adler and Karol Hiller.

Immediately after World War II, Muzeum Sztuki acquired paintings of Alexej Jawlensky. Soon, the museum was transferred to one of the palaces of the Poznański family, in Więckowskiego 36, which since 1948 has been one of its locations. Marian Minich was re-nominated as a director. It was he who adapted rooms in the palace to the needs of the museum and invited Władysław Strzemiński to cooperate, which resulted in the “Neoplastic Room” being added to the exhibition space. The collection of contemporary art was expanded with, inter alia, works by Jonasz Stern, Jerzy Nowosielski, and Alina Szapocznikow.

=== Ryszard Stanisławski and the Museum of Art in the 1950s ===
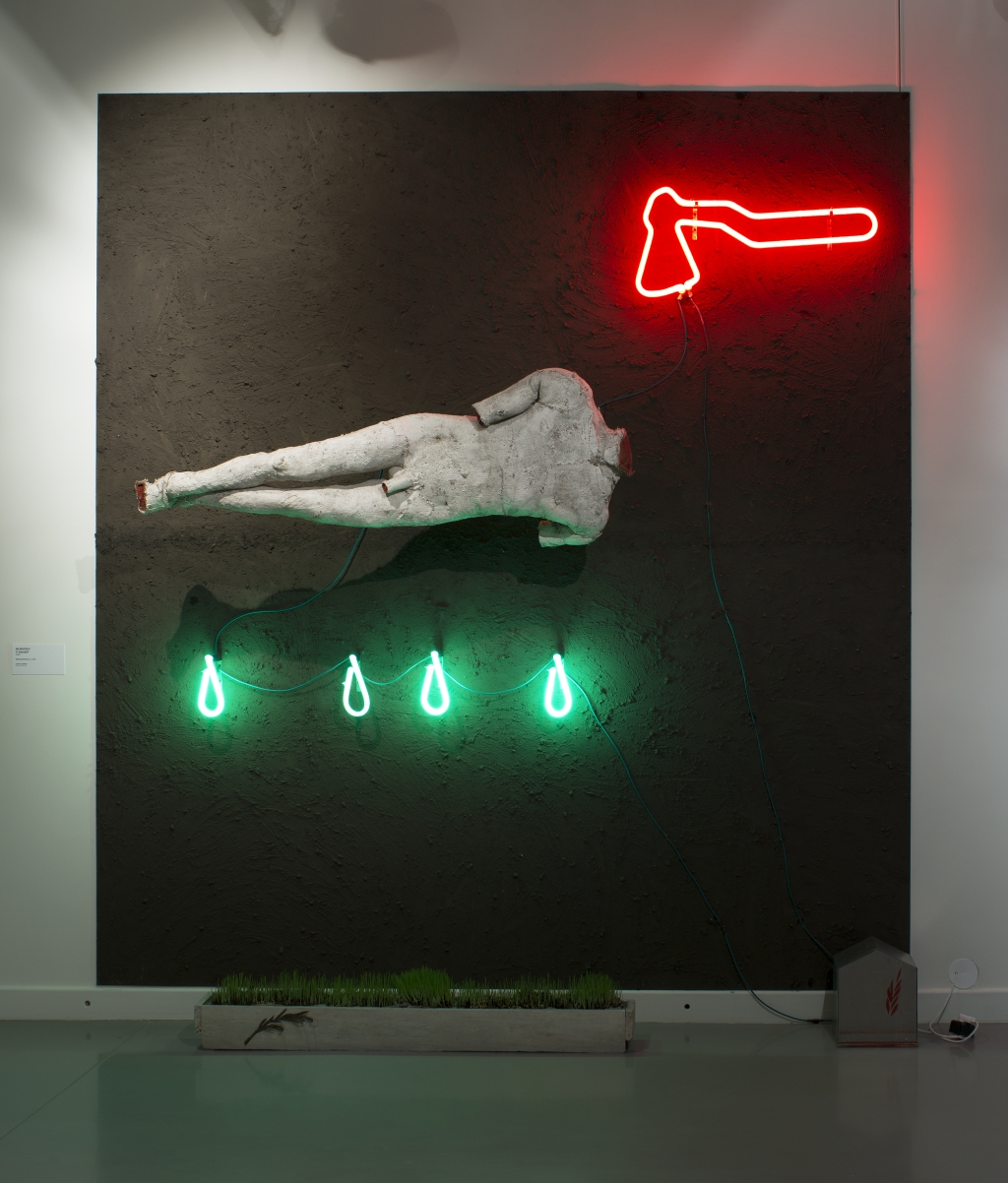
Mirosław Bałka, Św. Wojciech

In 1950 the museum changed its name to Muzeum Sztuki (Museum of Art) in Łódź. The second director of the museum became Ryszard Stanisławski, who headed the institution in the years 1966–1991. His goal was to expand the international collection of modern and contemporary art. In his museum practice he accentuated the pivotal role of the “museum as a critical instrument” and preferred focusing the collection on phenomena that were perceived as open, creative and authentic. Stanisławski's efforts led to the acquisition of the first painting from Roman Opałka series of “counted” paintings (others were to follow), the collection of early works of Krzysztof Wodiczko, Mirosław Bałka, and representatives of Warsztat Form Filmowej (Film Form Workshop). Muzeum also received a collection of works by Czech artists acquired at the end of the Prague Spring (e.g. Jiří Kolář). Mateusz Grabowski, owner of an avant-garde gallery in London, donated artworks representing British Pop Art and Op Art (e.g. Derek Boshier, Bridget Riley, and Pauline Boty). American artists (e.g. Sam Francis, Lawrence Weiner, Barbara Kasten, and Chris Burden) bestowed their works in exchange for artworks of Polish artists. The collection of works from the first Construction in Process (Polish: Konstrukcja w Procesie) festival donated by “Solidarity” (e.g. Peter Downsbrough, Dan Graham, and Richard Nonas) enriched the representation of minimal art.

In a symbolic gesture of solidarity with Polish society, Joseph Beuys donated ca. 300 artworks from his archives within the framework of “Polentransport 1981”.

Insufficient exhibition space was a permanent problem of the Muzeum. In the early 1970s a tender was advertised for the construction of a new building for the museum but the project has never been successfully accomplished due to the economic crisis. In 1973 the museum acquired an industrialist's mansion Edward Herbst Palace in Księży Młyn (Priest's Mill). Prospects of having a building that could meet exhibition requirements of avant-garde art became real with plans to develop the Manufaktura Shopping and Entertainment Centre in the former Izrael Poznański factory.

=== The ms^{2} branch ===
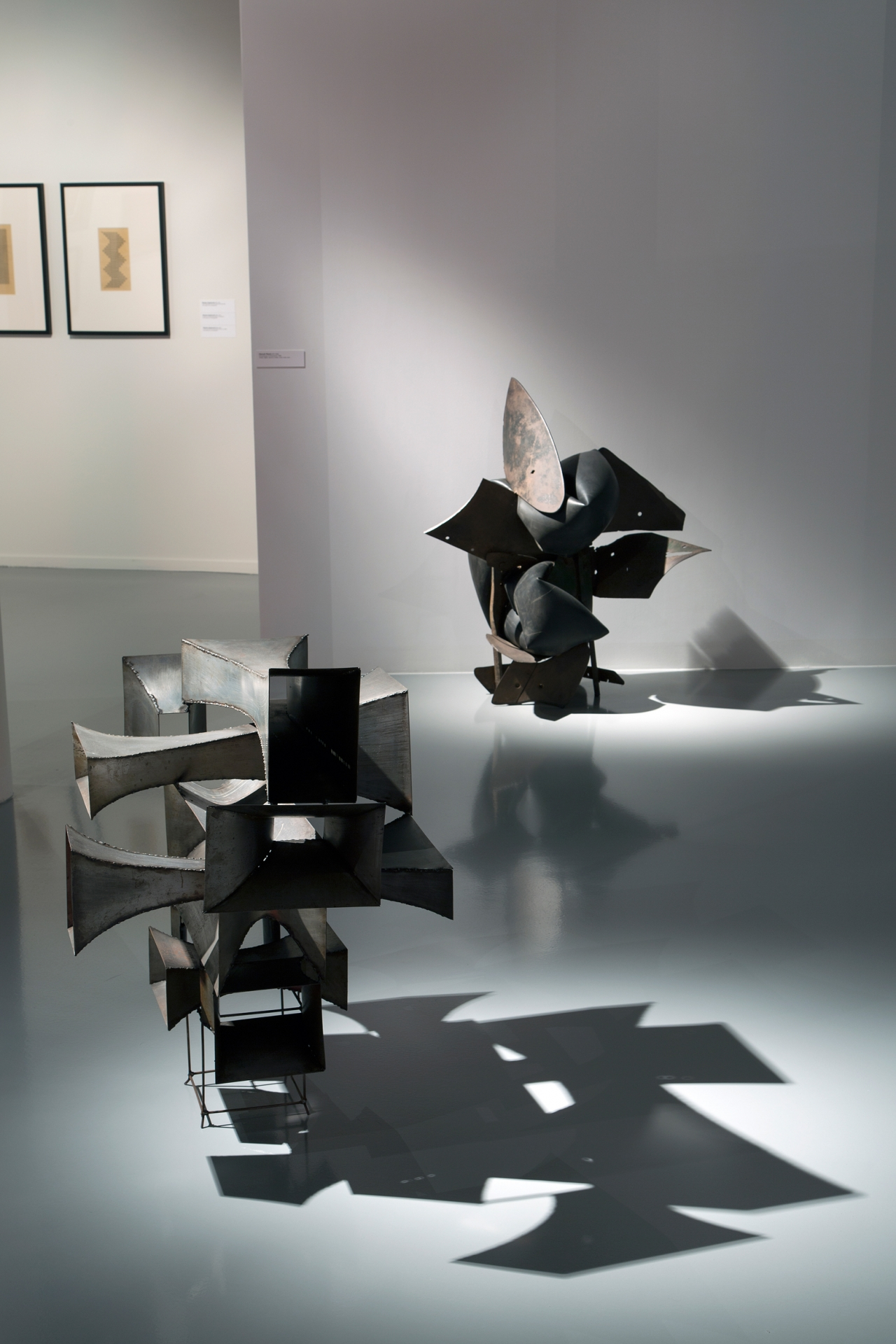
Atlas of Modernity permanent exhibition at ms^{2} branch

In 2006 Jarosław Suchan was appointed the director of the museum and he has been holding the post ever since. Funds acquired from the European Union (under the Integrated Regional Development Operational Programme), the Polish Ministry of Culture and National Heritage, Voivodeship Office, and the Marshal Office in Łódź were used to regenerate and modernise the former spinning mill in the factory of Izrael Poznański. In the autumn 2008 it became a new location of Muzeum Sztuki known as ms^{2} offering the space of 3000 m^{2}, which houses the Collection of the 20th and 21st Century Art; further 600 m^{2} are dedicated to temporary exhibitions.

The collection is exhibited in a way that departs from both the chronological arrangement of works of art and the idea of a ‘permanent exhibition’. New exhibition projects, whose aim is to uncover the potential of the collection anew, are underway within the framework of “works on the collection”. According to the programme: avant-garde is not treated as a closed chapter that belongs to the past but as a set of ideas, which may still be meaningful to a contemporary viewer. Muzeum Sztuki introduces the audience to contemporary and avant-garde art in locations at ms^{2} and ms^{1}. In the years 2011-2013 exhibition space in the building in Więckowskiego was refurbished. Edward Herbst villa that holds Old Masters Collection was also renovated in 2013.

== Muzeum’s locations ==
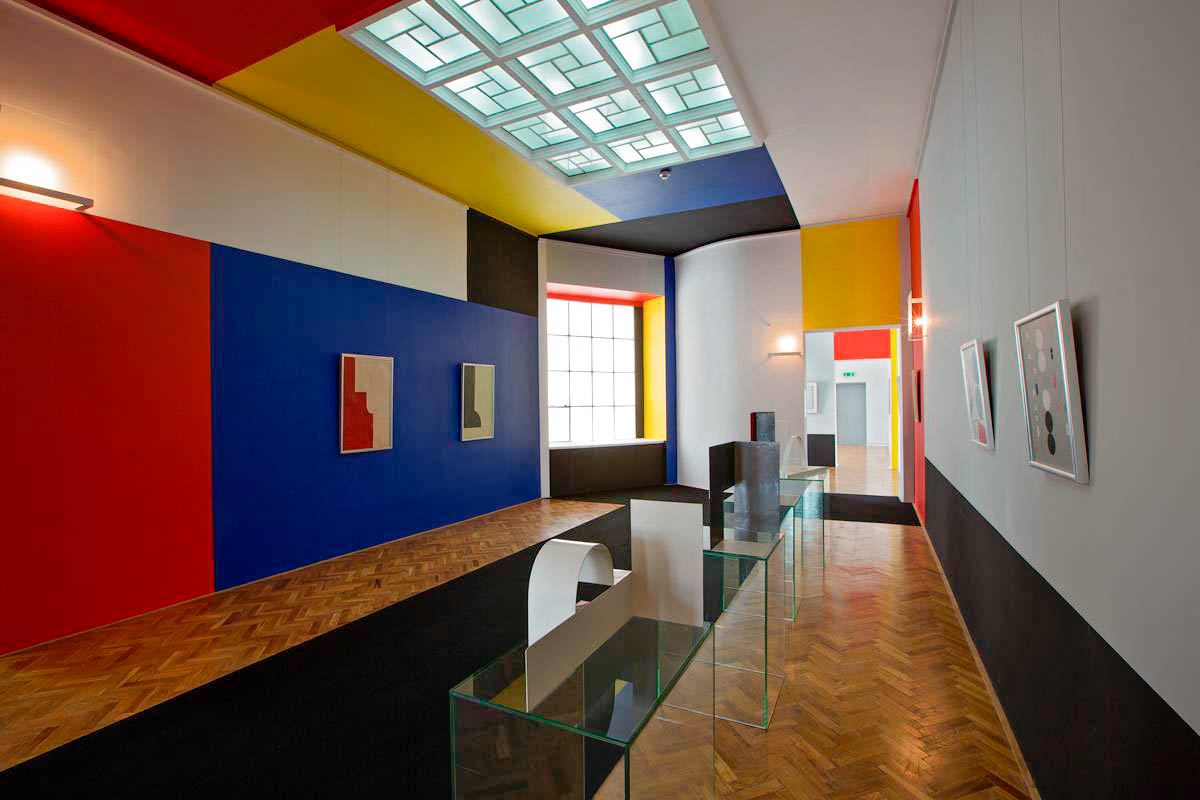
Neoplastic Room, ms^{1} branch

ms^{1}, Więckowskiego 36 (Maurycy Poznański palace) – with Neoplastic Room designed by Władysław Strzemiński, which was the core of the exposition of “a.r.” group International Collection of Modern Art. In 2008 the collection moved to the premises of ms^{2}, while the Neoplastic Room itself was left in its original place and the space around it is used to display works by contemporary artists, who make references to the Constructivism legacy within the project “Neoplastic Room Open Composition”. In ms^{1} at two floors of exhibition space we can find temporary exhibitions that show interesting phenomena in contemporary art. The garden in the backyard is used for open air events, such as film shows and concerts. The building houses also a coffee shop and a library open to all visitors.

ms^{2}, Ogrodowa 19 (building of the former spinning mill of Izrael Poznański factory) – facilities used for experimental interventions with the Collection of 20th and 21st century. The Museum's collection is organized around themes that exhibition curators consider relevant to modern audience. Space at the ground floor is used for temporary exhibitions that tackle mainly the issues connected with the avant-garde legacy. In the building there are rooms for workshops and other educational activities, as well as a multi-media room, which hosts, inter alia, lectures and film shows. There is also a coffee shop “Awangarda” and a bookshop selling books on art.

Herbst Villa, Przędzalniana 72 (Edward Herbst palace and garden complex) – a refurbished mansion formerly owned by a family of Łódź industrialists has become the exhibition space for old masters works (mainly those of the 19th century), presentation of palace interiors from the turn of the 19th and 20th centuries and the overview of the history of the Herbst family of industrial tycoons.

== Collections ==
The collection includes paintings, sculptures and spatial objects, drawings, photographs, video, and installations. It is the largest and the oldest museum collection of modern art in this part of Europe. The collection of Muzeum Sztuki in Łódź was initiated by the members of the ”a.r.” group: Władysław Strzemiński, Katarzyna Kobro, Henryk Stażewski, Julian Przyboś, and Jan Brzękowski, who since 1929 had been involved in collecting modern art. It was made available to the public for the first time in February 1931 at the original seat of the museum in Wolności Square [Polish: Plac Wolności]. After 1945 the collection has been being supplemented predominantly with the works by contemporary artists.

The collection includes artworks by artists, such as: Max Ernst, Władysław Strzemiński, Katarzyna Kobro, Kurt Schwitters, Kazimierz Podsadecki, Enrico Prampolini, Janusz Maria Brzeski, Teresa Żarnower, Mieczysław Szczuka, Włodzimierz Borowski, Derek Boshier, Christian Boltanski, Joseph Beuys, Bridget Riley, Alina Szapocznikow, Ewa Partum, Krzysztof Wodiczko, Edward Krasiński, Ali Kazma, Barbara Hammer, Agnieszka Kalinowska, Zofia Kulik, Jadwiga Maziarska, Erna Rosenstein, Jadwiga Sawicka, Ahlam Shibli, Mladen Stilinović, Mona Vătămanu & Florin Tudor, Haegue Yang, Konrad Smoleński, Cezary Bodzianowski, Zbigniew Libera, Artur Żmijewski, Julita Wójcik, Antje Majewski, and Allan Sekula.

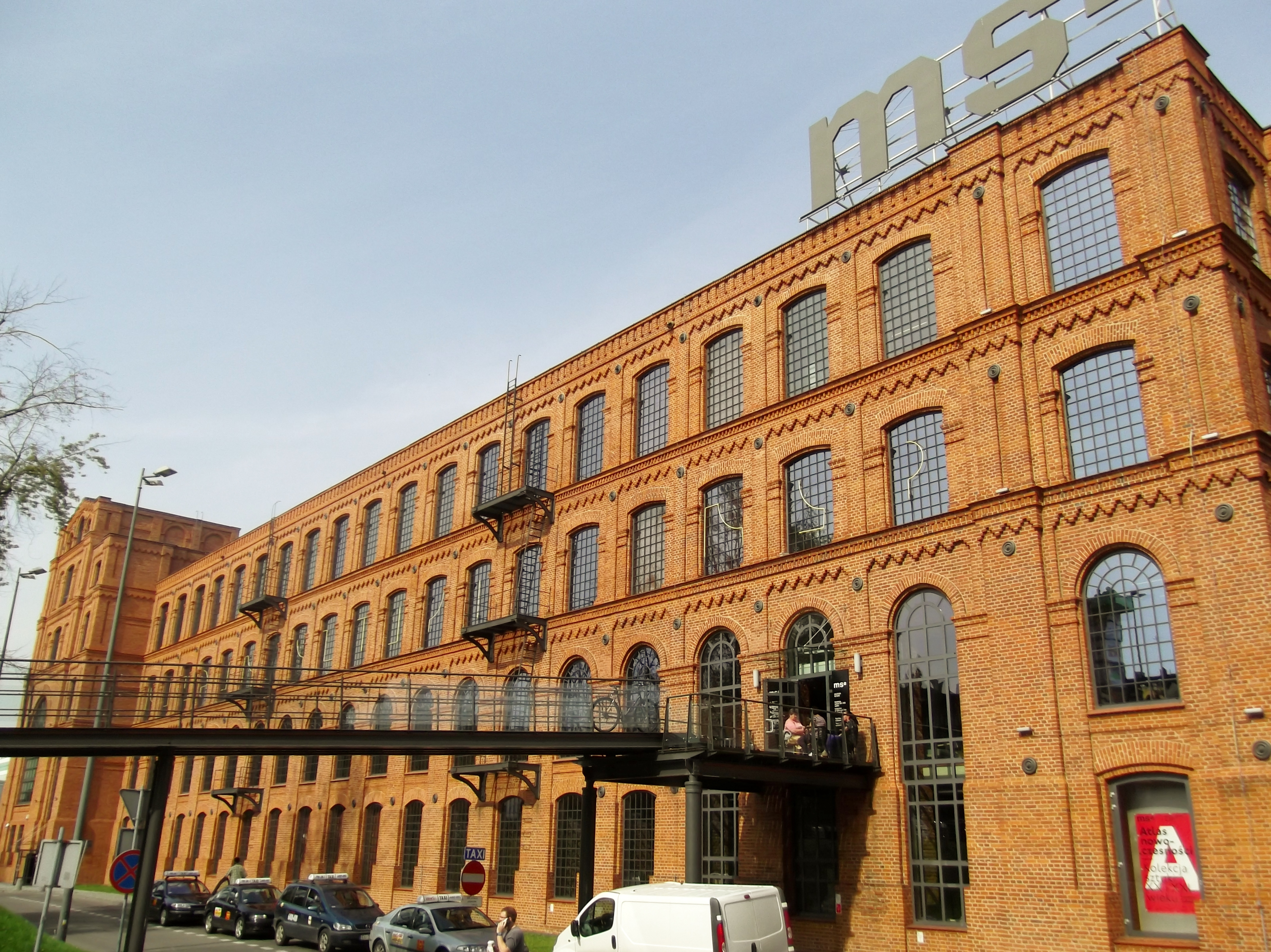
ms^{2}

=== Atlas of Modernity. Collection of 20th and 21st Century Art ===
Opened on 24 February 2014 in ms^{2}, a division of Muzeum of Art in Łódź, is an overview of the collection featuring works by artists active in the 20th and 21st centuries. The exhibition occupies three floors in the premises owned by Muzeum Sztuki located in the shopping and entertainment centre Manufaktura in Łódź. It covers in total 2700 m^{2}, where the visitors may see more than 200 exhibits whose number changes depending on the exhibition projects hosted in this space.

“Atlas of Modernity” is another stage in the works on Muzeum Sztuki in Łódź collection that have been continued since 2008 and “whose goal is to research, re-interpret and update the meaning of artworks included in the collection.” The exhibition refers to the idea of art historian Aby Warburg and his project “Mnemosyne Atlas”, it departs from both the chronological arrangement of works of art and the idea of a ‘permanent exhibition’. The exposition “has given up typical linearity that organises museum’s collection against a timeline of art history and groups artworks into schools, trends, styles or tendencies.” Works focus around 14 notions connected with the idea of modernity: “museum”, “autonomy”, “capital”, “machine”, “city”, “progress”, “experiment”, “propaganda”, “norm”, “tradition”, “catastrophe”, “me”, “emancipation”, and “revolution”; “creating a ‘collage’ of artworks from different periods representing different aesthetics and artistic attitudes around these notions; the exhibition poses questions about how the phenomena changed, how the way they were perceived altered and, most importantly, to what extent they shape our today's reality.”

The exhibition has been prepared by a curatorial team headed by Jarosław Suchan, the Muzeum’s director, and composed of: Aleksandra Jach, Paulina Kurc-Maj, Maria Morzuch, Anna Saciuk-Gąsowska, Joanna Sokołowska, Katarzyna Słoboda, and Magdalena Ziółkowska.

=== Polish Painting ===
The Collection is a representative selection of artworks by Polish artists, in particular of the 19th and the turn of the 19th and 20th centuries, including some masterpieces of Polish painting such as: “Portrait of the Artist’s Mother” (1853) by Henryk Rodakowski, “Napoleon on Horseback” by Piotr Michałowski, “Sleeping Mietek” by Stanisław Wyspiański, and “Sobieski in Częstochowa” by Jan Matejko.

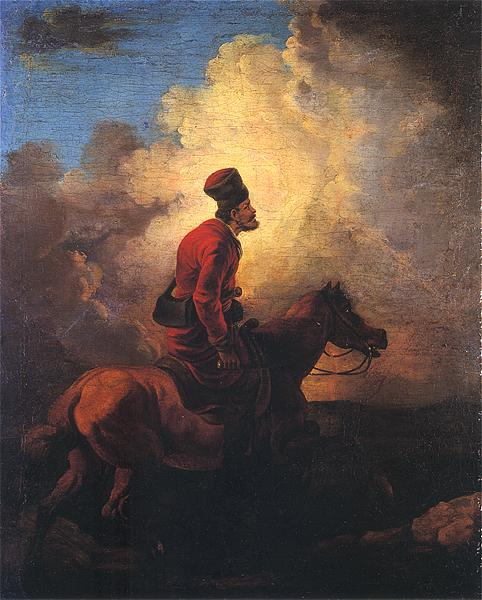
Cossack on Horseback, Aleksander Orłowski

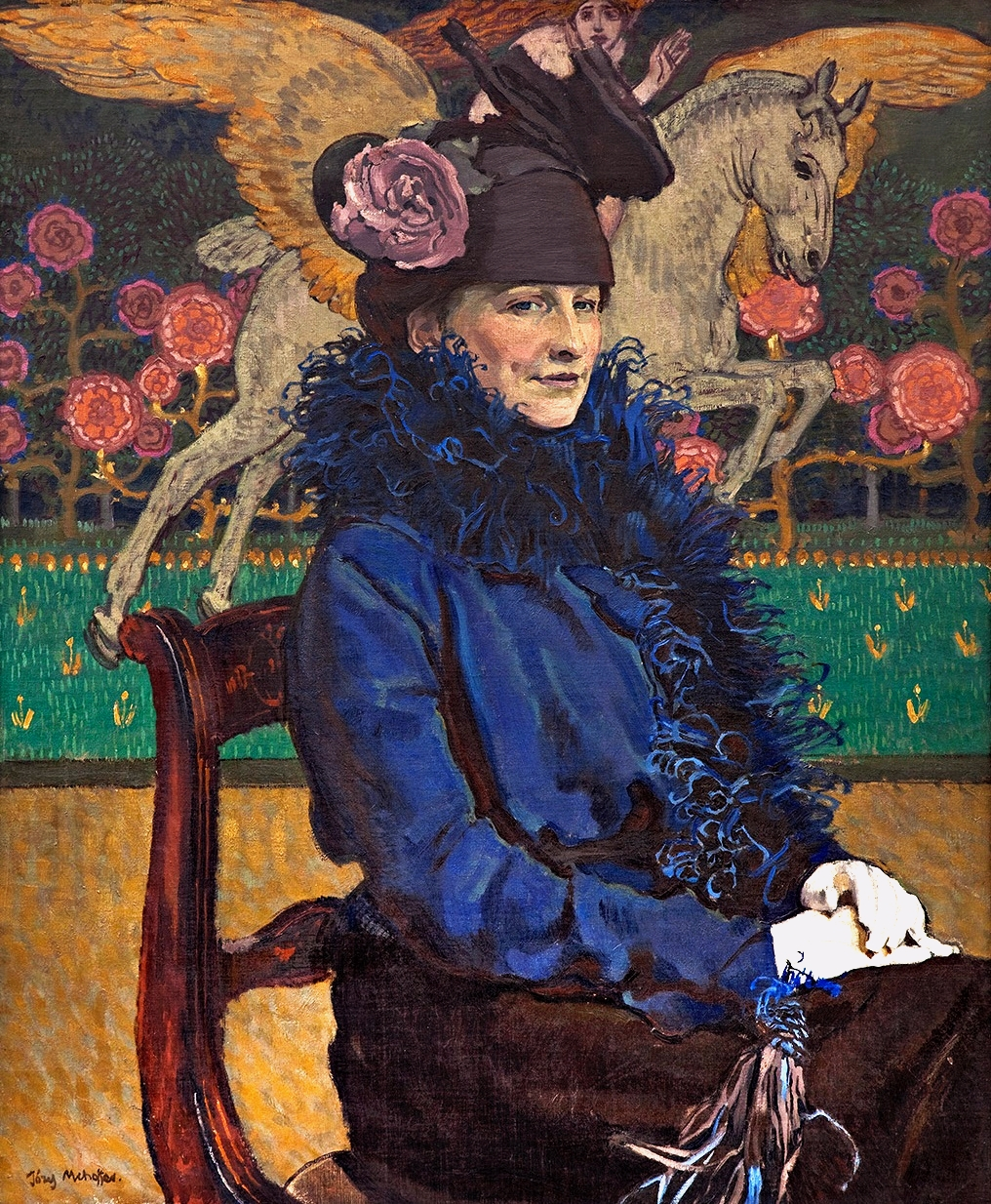
Portrait of artist's wife with Pegasus, Józef Mehoffer

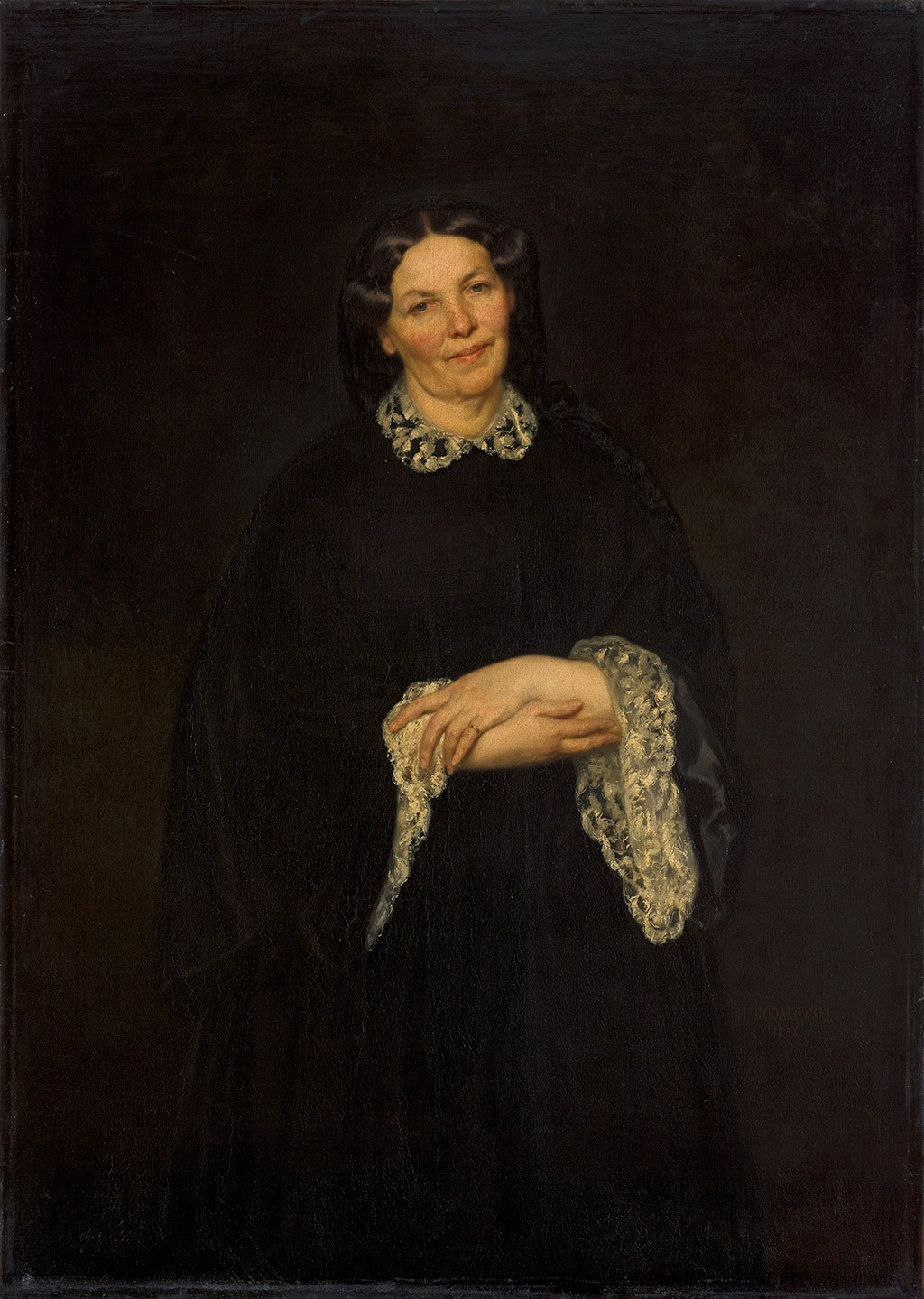
Portrait of Mother, Henryk Rodakowski

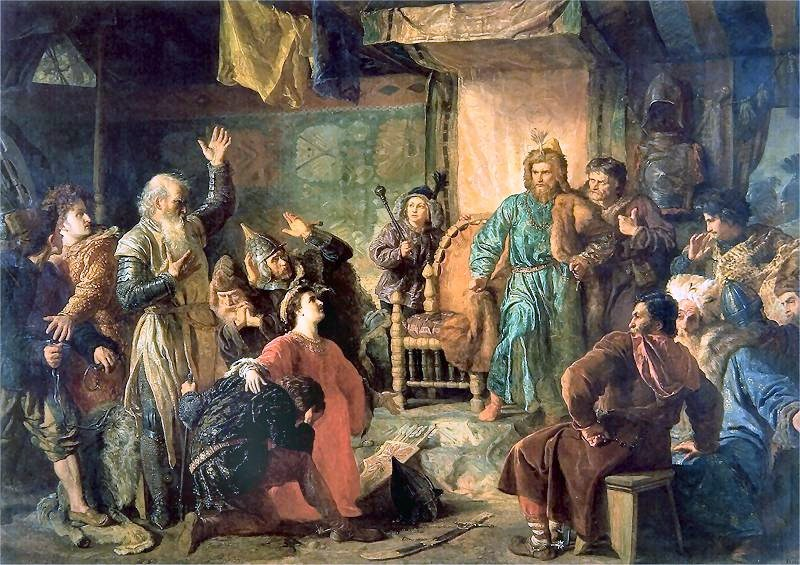
Kęstutis and Vytautas imprisoned by Jogaila, Wojciech Gerson

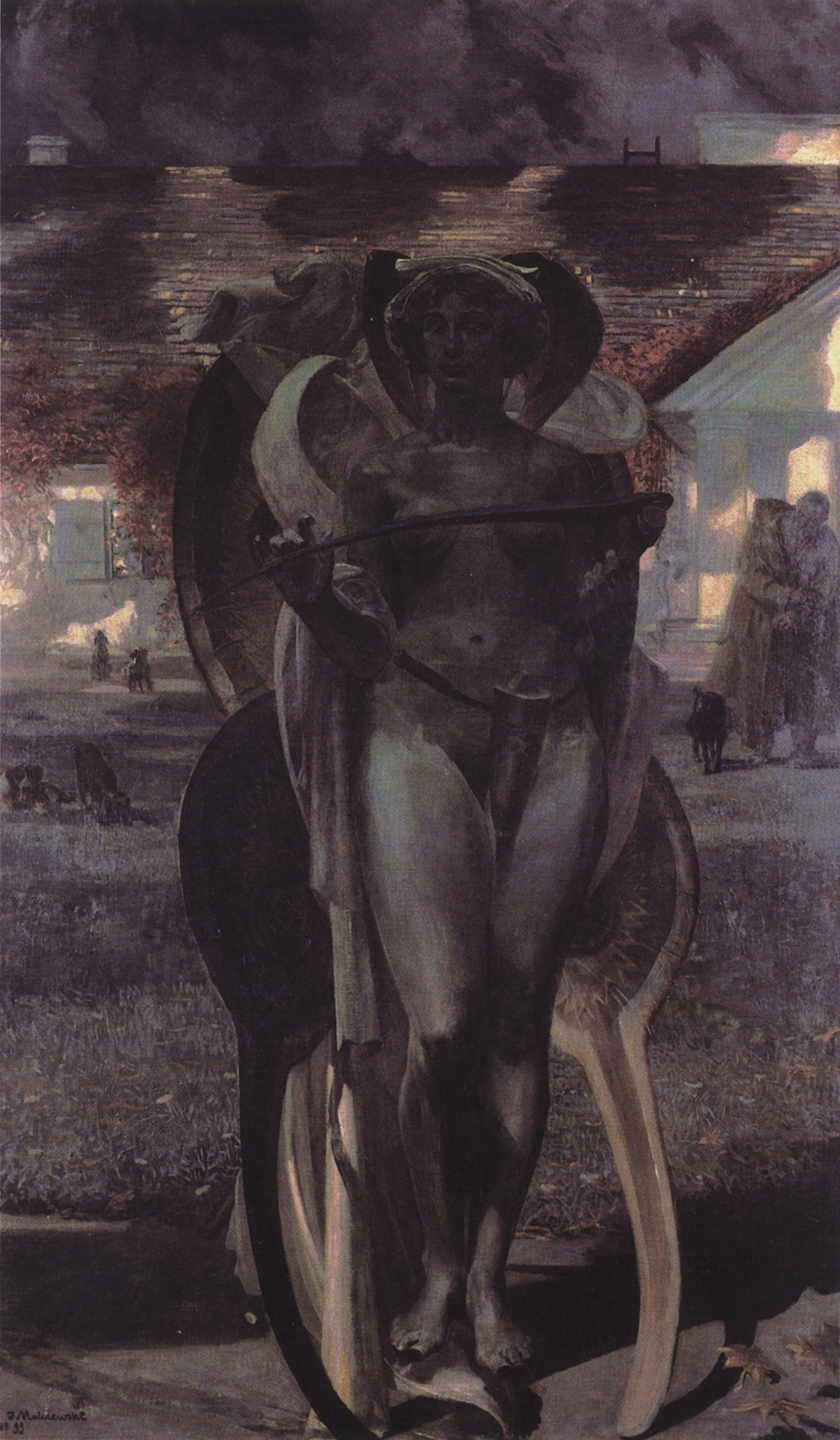
Thanatos II, Jacek Malczewski

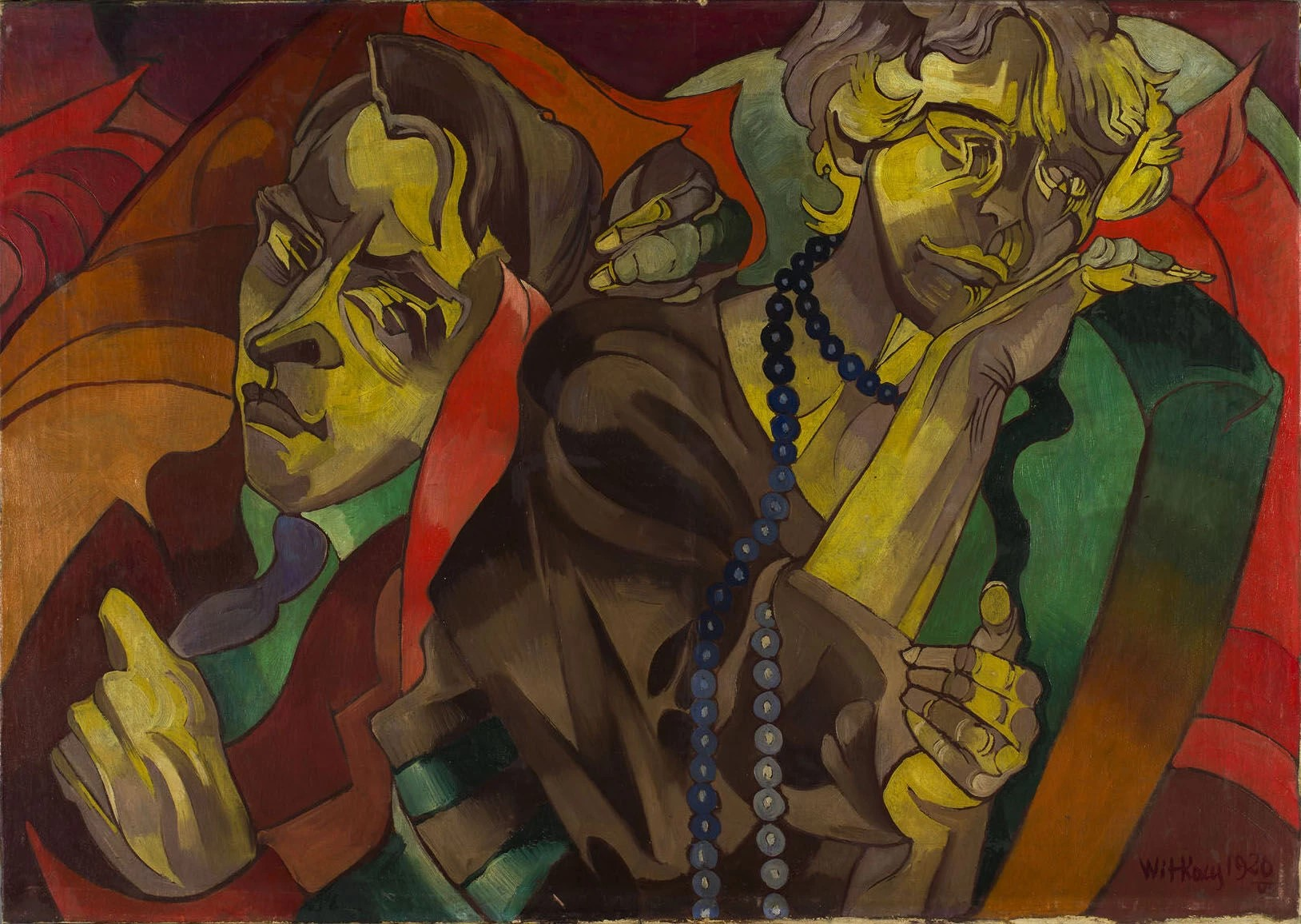
Two Heads, Stanisław Ignacy Witkiewicz

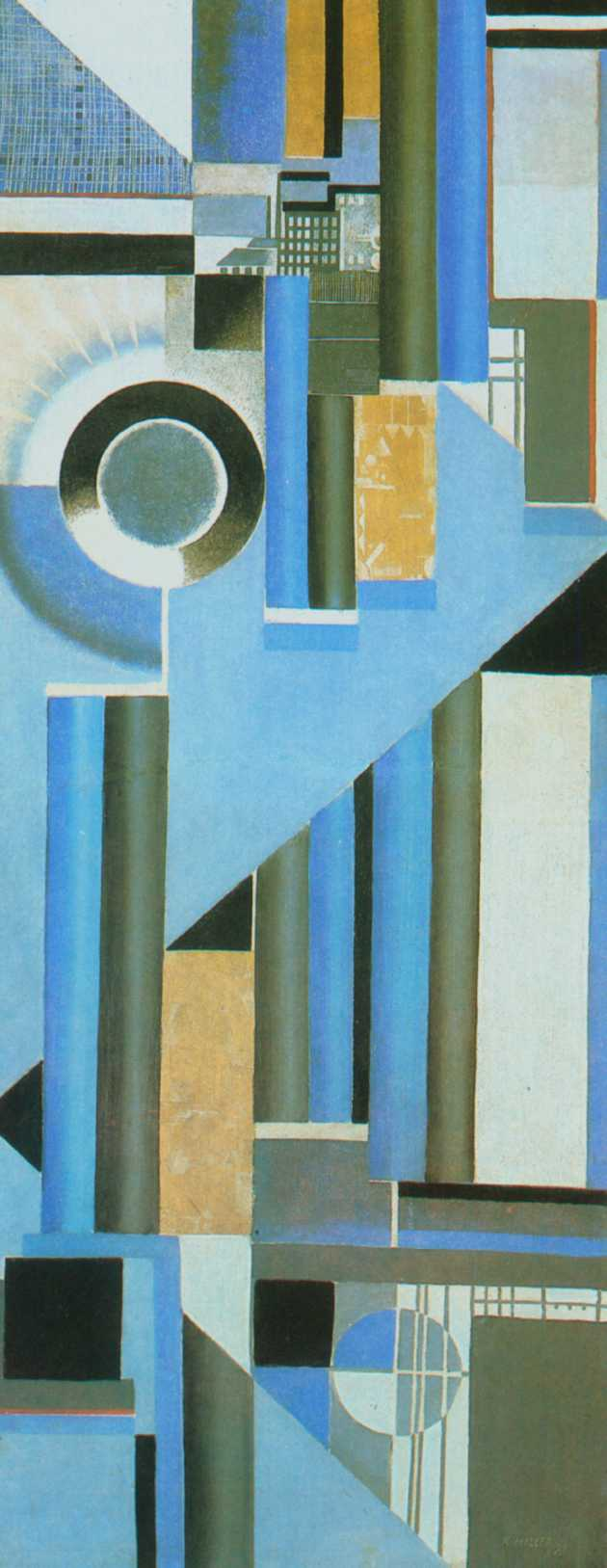
Composition "o", Karol Hiller

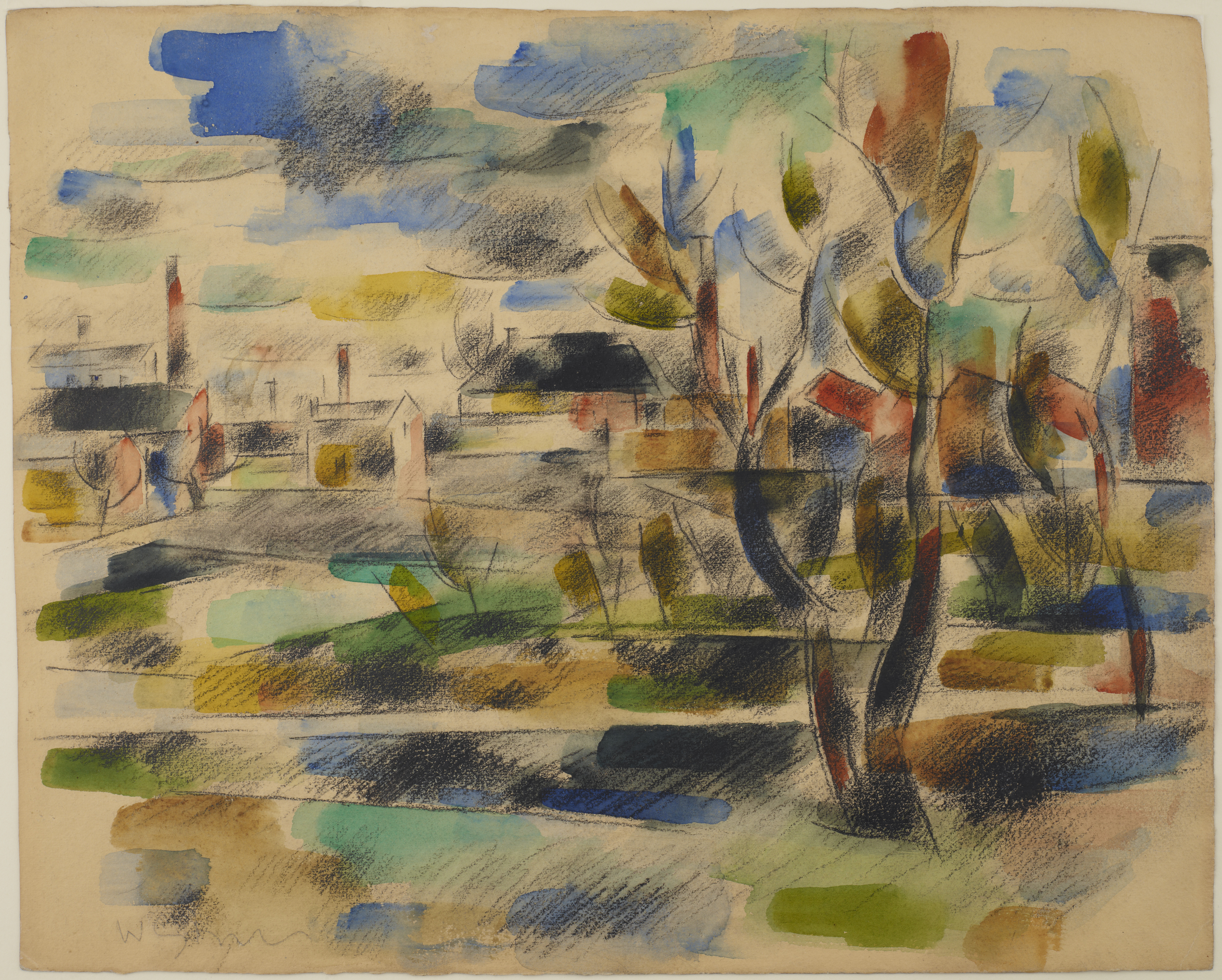
Landscape of Łódź Seen From Retkinia, Władysław Strzemiński

=== Collection highlights ===
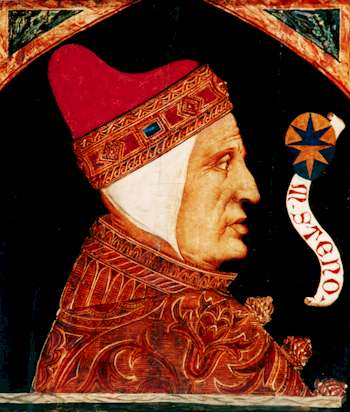
Portrait of Doge Michele Steno, Unknown

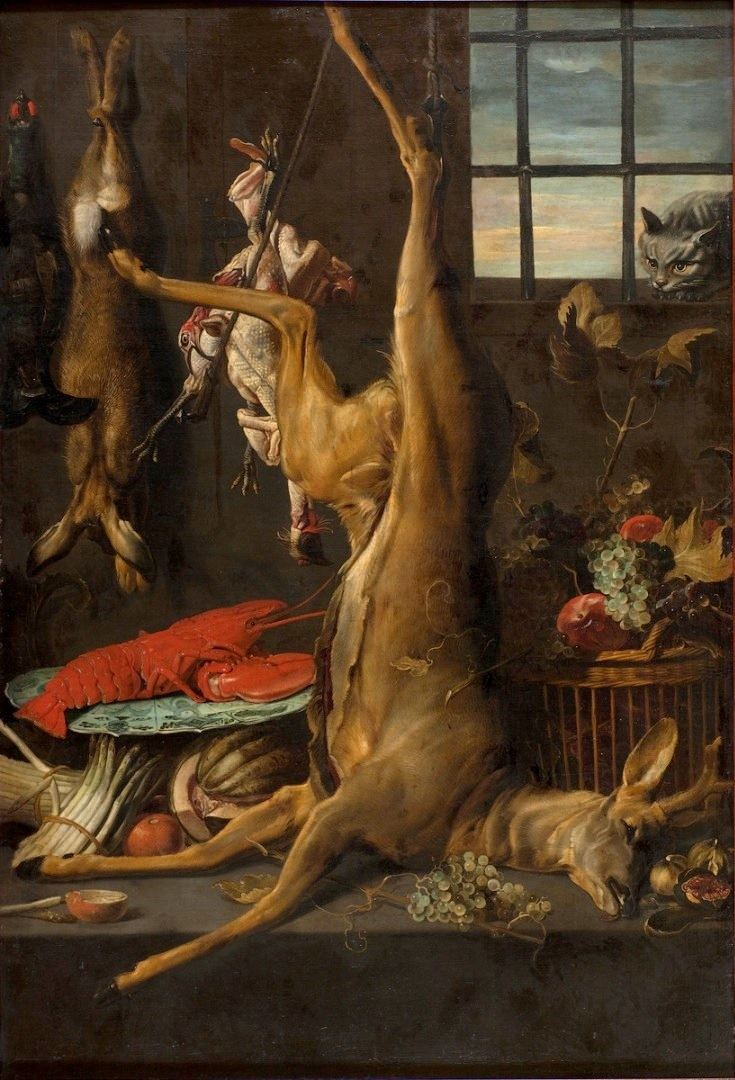
Still-life with a Roe Deer, Frans Snyders

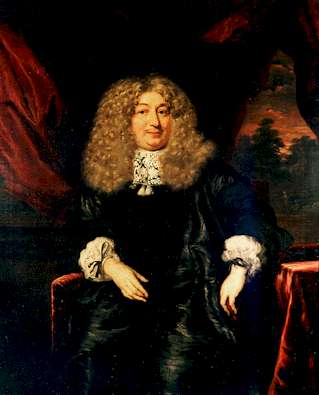
Portrait of a Man in a Wig, Nicolaes Maes

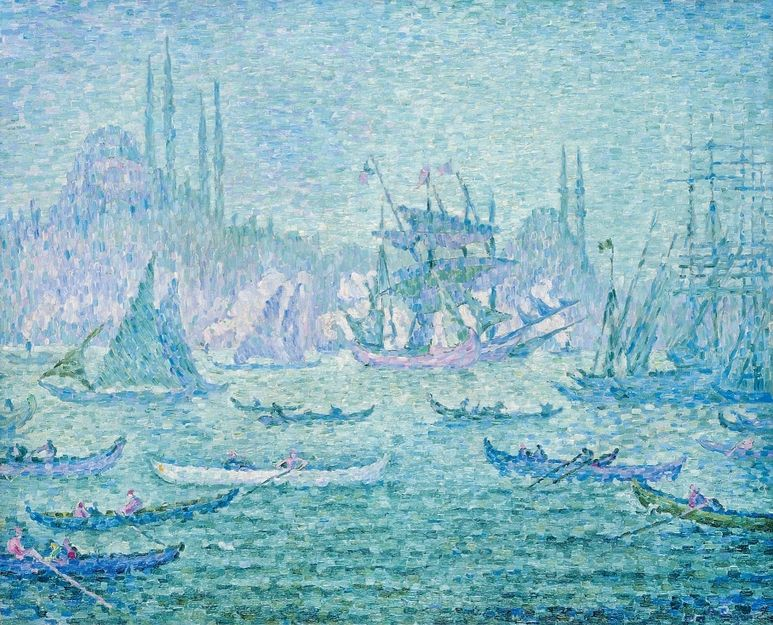
View of the Golden Horn, Paul Signac

== Education and Promotion of Art ==
One of the objectives behind the idea of collection efforts initiated by “a.r.” group and further continued by the Muzeum was to disseminate knowledge about art and to present the achievements of avant-garde art to the largest audiences possible. The Muzeum accomplishes this goal through, inter alia, cooperation with other museums in the world, publishing activities, education effort (workshops, lectures, guided tours), and its media presence (in cooperation with TVP kultura TV channel, Muzeum Sztuki creates “Kulturanek” [Cultural Morning] - a series of programmes on art addressed to young audience).

=== ms opus ===
Project “ms opus” is the effect of cooperation between Muzeum Sztuki and Opus Film film production company – it documents exhibitions and presents artists and curators. Video recordings from exhibitions available on the Internet have enabled wide audiences to learn more about Muzeum's exhibition projects.

=== ms club ===
ms club is a membership programme intended to attract a community of visitors and sponsors, which is also a kind of subscription that offers free admission to exhibitions and events. Two types of membership cards are currently available: MS CLUB and MS CLUB STUDENT.

=== ms Award ===
The award is given by Muzeum Sztuki in recognition of the patronage extended to the Muzeum, its promotion or any other form of active support to its interests in Poland and abroad. It is awarded to institutions, companies, representatives of the media, and private persons as a token of gratitude for their engagement and promotion of active attitudes in culture in the preceding year.

Previous winners of the ms Award:

- 2009: Marzena Bomanowska (for 2008) for helping to promote the events in Muzeum Sztuki, in particular the opening of ms2
- 2010: Jarosław Przyborowski (for 2009) thanks to whom it was possible to purchase Daniel Buren's work Cabane éclatée for the museum collection
- 2011: Piotr Dzięcioł (for 2010), for helping to produce films from every exhibition as a part of the “ms opus” project
- 2012: PEKAO S.A.
- 2013: Łódź Association for the Encouragement of Fine Art
- 2014: TVP Kultura

=== Katarzyna Kobro Prize ===
The idea of the Katarzyna Kobro Prize annually awarded by artists to an artist they wish to honour originates from Józef Robakowski with initial involvement of the late Nika Strzemińska, daughter of Katarzyna Kobro and Władysław Strzemiński. The Prize is intended to pay tribute to artists representing progressive and exploratory stance, open to creative intellectual exchange who are involved in initiating cultural events. Until 2011 the Prize was awarded by Wschodnia Gallery [Polish: Galeria Wschodnia], however, in 2011 Dariusz Bieńkowski (the founder of the prize) and Józef Robakowski moved it to Muzeum Sztuki in Łódź. The Katarzyna Kobro Prize is awarded every December by a college of representatives of various genres of art.

== See also ==
- Construction in Process
- Museum of Contemporary Art in Kraków
- Zachęta National Gallery of Art
