= Rolke =

Rolke is a surname. Notable people with the surname include:

- Brunon Rolke (1896–1971), lieutenant colonel of the Polish Army infantry, independence activist, knight of the Order of Virtuti Militari
- Lothar Rolke (born 1954), German economist and social scientists, professor of at Mainz University of Applied Sciences
- Tadeusz Rolke (1929–2025), Polish photographer
- Tony Rölke (born 2003), German footballer
