= Michel Bouvet =

French painter

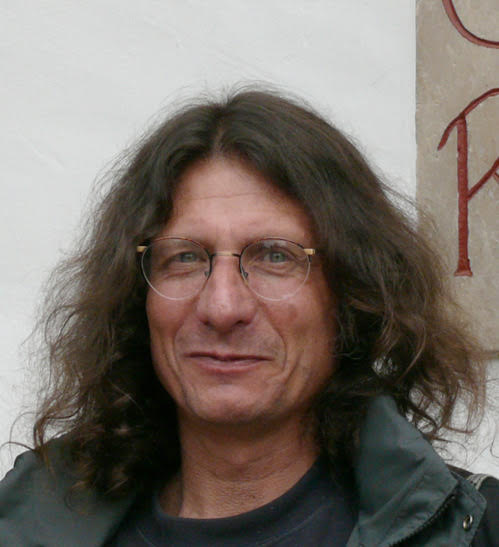
Michel Bouvet

Michel Bouvet (born 1955 in Tunis) is a French designer and poster artist. He is professor of visual culture at ESAG Penninghen (Paris).

== Biography ==
Bouvet studied and graduated at École nationale supérieure des Beaux-Arts (ENSB-A).

His design influences include Fernand Léger, Raymond Savignac, André François and Roman Cieslewicz.

His posters are very often the result of a mixture of techniques (photography, collage, sculpture, painting), which gives them a highly poetic graphic dimension.

He has won many national and international design awards in Poland, Finland, Japan, China, Czech Republic

Since 2002, he designs the corporate identity for the Rencontres d'Arles.

He has been the curator of several international graphic design exhibitions.

He is a member of Alliance Graphique Internationale (AGI).

== Honors and awards ==
- Lenica Prize, 18th International Poster Biennial in Warsaw, 2002
- Alphonse Mucha Prize, 22nd Brno International Graphic Design Festival, 2006
- Grand Prix for Cultural Poster Design, International Poster Biennial in Mexico, 2014
- Officer of the Ordre des Arts et des Lettres, France, 2023

== Exhibitions ==
- 1991: Long Live the Poster, Lalit Kala Akademi, National Academy of Art, New Delhi
- 1994: Third International Biennial of Poster in Mexico
- 1995: 38th DDD Gallery Exhibition (Japan)
- 2001: The 2nd International Poster Exhibition, Ningbo (China)
- 2005: Michel Bouvet Plakaty Posters, National Museum in Poznan, curated by Irena Przymus (Poland)
- 2008: Arrivage, affiches récentes de Michel Bouvet, Centre Culturel Français, Phnom Penh (Cambodia)
- 2009: 16th Biennial Colorado International Invitational Poster Exhibition
- 2010: Carteles de Michel Bouvet, Sala de exposiciones Riviera del Mar Salinas & Alliance Française, Quito (Ecuador)
- 2011: Manzana Uno, Santa Cruz de la Sierra (Bolivia)
- 2012: The Typo in All its Forms, Gobelins School of the Image (Paris)

== Curator ==
- 2006: 9 Women in Graphic Design, Échirolles European Graphic Center (France)
- 2008-2009: We Love Books: A World Tour, Échirolles European Graphic Center (France) with Philippe Di Folco, deputy curator

== Conference and jury ==
- 2005: CAFA Central Academy of Fine Arts (Beijing), China
- 2007: Taiwan International Poster Design Award
- 2008: Chicago International Poster Biennial Jury Exhibition
- 2009: The 9th International Poster Triennial in Toyama, Museum of Modern Art (Japan)
- 2010: Agidies International Design Week, Melbourne (Australia)
- 2010: Positive Posters International Annual Exhibition (Melbourne)

== See also ==
- List of graphic designers
- Graphic design
