= Landscape of Łódź Seen from Retkinia =

1941 painting by Władysław Strzemiński

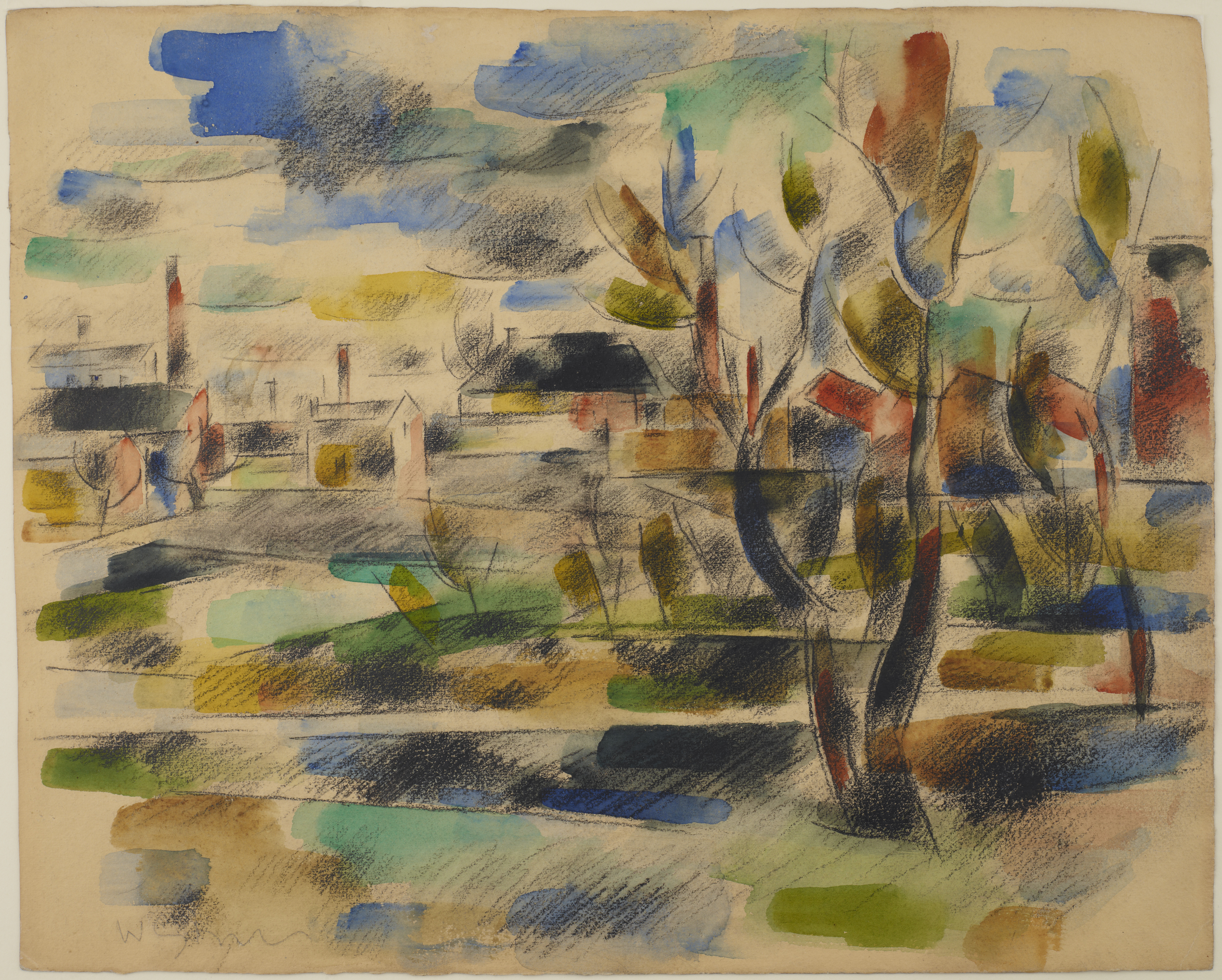
- Artist: Władysław Strzemiński
- Year: 1941
- Medium: Watercolour on paper
- Movement: Constructivism
- Dimensions: 31.5 cm × 37.5 cm (12.4 in × 14.8 in)
- Location: Museum of Art; Łódź

Landscape of Łódź Seen from Retkinia (Polish: Pejzaż łódzki od strony Retkini) is a 1941 watercolour on paper painting by the Polish Constructivist painter Władysław Strzemiński. It is held at the Museum of Art, Łódź.

== Description and history ==
The painting depicts a city landscape of Łódź seen from Retkinia, a panel block housing estate and district in the city. The composition is filled with horizontal watercolour lines ranging in colour from green, ochre and vermilion as well as diagonal shadows drawn with a pencil. The shapes of houses, factory chimneys and trees have been marked in black. The landscape portrayed by Strzemiński bears some features of analytic Cubism and is a real yet simplified view of the city.

Painted in 1941, Landscape of Łódź Seen from Retkinia was created using the watercolour technique on paper, rather than oil on canvas. This could have resulted from the inaccessibility of necessary materials at the time and the artist's difficult financial situation as he spent World War II in Łódź. The painting is currently displayed at the Museum of Art in Łódź.

== See also ==
- Constructivism
- List of Polish painters
