= Roman Cieślewicz =

Polish artist

- Cieślewicz in Warsaw, 1960
- Born: January 13, 1930; Lwów, Poland
- Died: January 21, 1996 (aged 66); Antony, France
- Occupation: Graphic designer
- Known for: Poster design

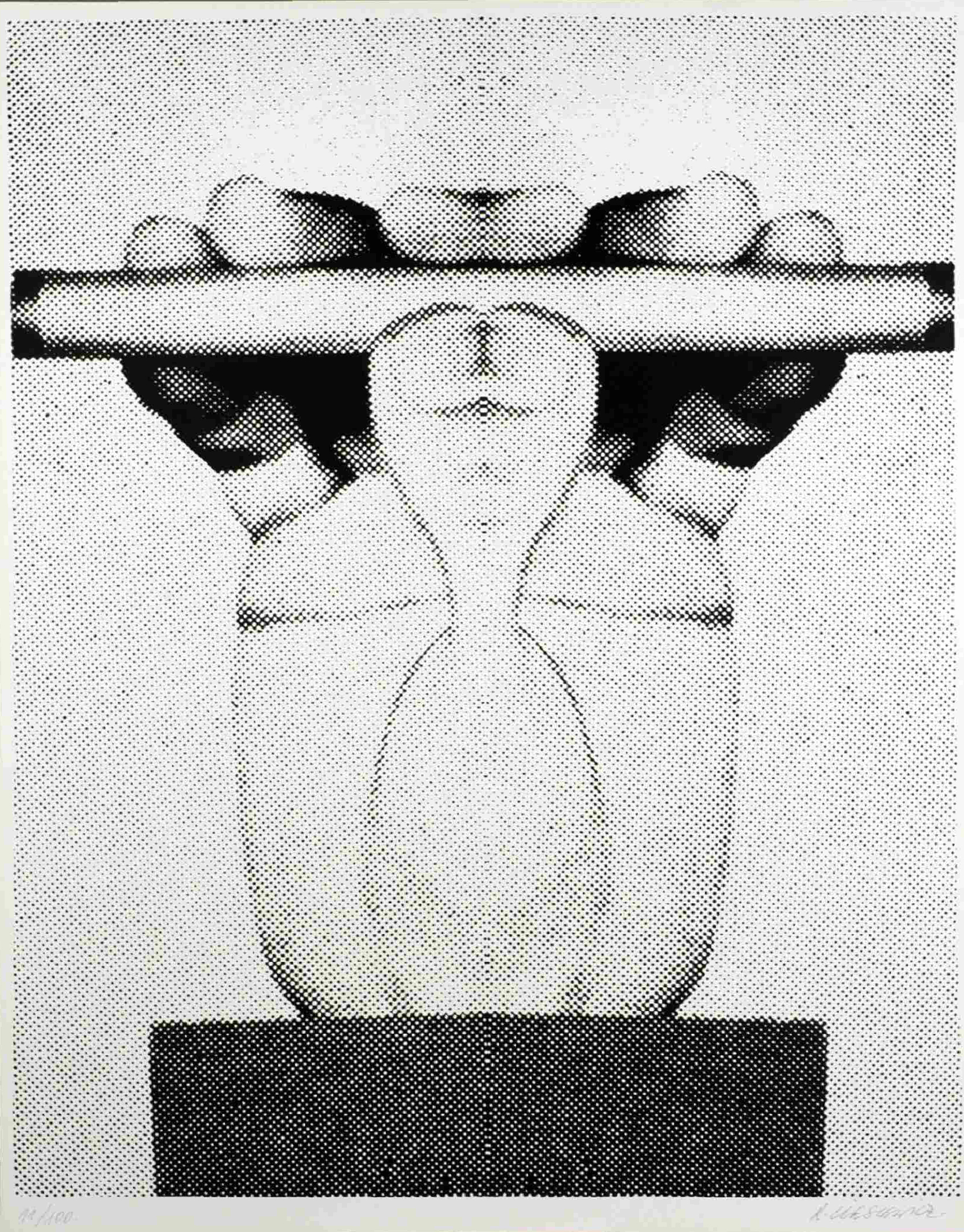
Untitled serigraphy (1978).

Roman Cieślewicz (13 January 1930 – 21 January 1996) was a Polish (naturalized French) graphic artist and photographer.

From 1943 to 1946 he attended the School of Artistic Industry in Lvov and from 1947 to 1949 attended the Krakow's Fine Arts Lycee. He studied at Kraków Academy of Fine Arts from 1949 to 1955. He was an artistic editor of "Ty i Ja" monthly (Warsaw) 1959–1962. In 1963, he moved to France and naturalized in 1971. He worked as art director of Vogue, Elle (1965–1969) and Mafia - advertising agency (1969–1972) and was artistic creator of Opus International (1967–1969). Kitsch (1970–1971) and Cnac-archives (1971–1974). Taught at the Ecole Superieure d'Arts Graphiques (ESAG) in Paris. In 1976 he produced his "reviev of panic information" - "Kamikaze"/No. 1/ published by Christian Bourgois. In 1991 he produced "Kamikaze 2" with Agnes B. He took part in numerous group exhibitions of graphic, poster and photographic art and was a member of AGI (Alliance Graphique Internationale).

== Major awards ==
- 1964 - Grand Prix, International Exhibition of Film Posters in Karlove Vary (Czech Republic)
- 1964 - Gold Medal, 1st Biennial of Industrial Forms in Ljubljana (Yugoslavia)
- 1972 - Gold Medal, 4th International Biennial of Posters in Warsaw (Poland)
- 1979 - Grand Prix for posters in Paris (France)
- 1984 - Bronze Medal, International Biennial of Posters
- 1990 - Grand Prix of "Art Graphique" (France)
- 1991 - Excellence Prize at Biennial of Graphic in Zagreb (Yugoslavia)
- 1992 - President Price, Biennial of Applied Graphic in Brno (Slovakia)
- 1993 – Second prize, Poster Biennale Lahti (Finland)

Source: theartofposter.com

== Exhibitions ==
- 1972 - Musee des Arts Decoratifs, Paris France
- 1973 - Stedelijk Museum, Amsterdam the Netherlands
- 1974 - Muzeum Plakatu, Warsaw Poland
- 1978 - Stedelijk Museum, Amsterdam the Netherlands
- 1981 - Muzeum Narodowe, Poznan Poland
- 1984 - Kunsthalle, Darmstadt Germany
- 1986 - Galeria BWA, Łódź Poland
- 1987 - Galerie de Pret, Angres France
- 1993 - The Polish Museum of America, Chicago USA
- 1993 - Centre Georges Pompidou, Paris France
- 1994 - Narodowa Galeria Sztuki Wspolczesnej Zacheta, Warsaw Poland
- 1998 - Muzeum Plakatu, Warsaw Poland
- 2006 - Les Rencontres d'Arles, France
- 2010 - Royal College of Art in London, United Kingdom

Source: theartofposter.com

== See also ==
- Michel Bouvet
- List of graphic designers
- List of Polish painters
- List of Polish graphic designers
- Graphic design
