= Josef Wagner (born 1938) =

Josef Wagner Jr. (born 24 May 1938, in Prague) painter, graphic artist, architect, pedagogue, a representative of contemporary Czech painting. At least four of his works are housed at the National Library of the Czech Republic.

== Life ==
Born in Prague on 24 May 1938, he comes from an old artistic family. His father, Josef Wagner (1901–1957), was an outstanding sculptor of the interwar and post-war eras; his mother, Marie Wagnerová–Kulhánková (1906–1983), as well as his brother, Jan Wagner (1941–2005), were also sculptors.

Josef Wagner studied architecture at the Academy of Arts, Architecture and Design in Prague. After graduation he devoted himself to the designing of housing and garden architecture, photography, and scenography. For almost 30 years he had been occupied with exhibition installations as head of the Exhibition Centre of the Union of Czechoslovak Visual Artists and as a collaborator of the National Gallery in Prague. On his study travels he visited a number of European countries, particularly France, Italy, Switzerland, and Greece. He has been living and working in Prague.

== Work ==
J. Wagner started painting in 1957 and permanently since 1963. In his works he was gradually concerned with the themes of Prague, particularly of Holešovice and its port. In the latter half of the sixties, the themes of World War Two often appeared. After the occupation in 1968 he turned his attention also to general themes of still lifes and landscapes; dominating towers and cranes keep appearing. He created broadly conceived cycles of “Heads” (The Head of a Teacher, of Interrogator K., of Interrogator L., of a Deserter, or of an Executor of Police Orders), “Skulls”, “Honours”, or “Bestiary” (Predatory Fish, Protected Hedgehog, Cocooned Scarab Beetle, Dragon). After 1989 J. Wagner has been creating also pictures and graphics inspired by study travels to Greece, Italy, and France, as well as works reflecting contemporary world in mythical motifs or symbols of power. His works are represented in a number of both state-owned and private collections, both in the Czech Republic and abroad.

Apart from some 800 oil paintings, he is the author of a number of drawings and graphics (Grand Diploma for Graphic International Biennial Exhibition of Tuzla, 2004). He is the holder of the Award of the Czech-Bavarian Artistic Society (1994), the Award of the Masaryk Academy of Art (1997), and the Rudolph II Prize for Artistic and Cultural Activities (1997). Out of a number of exhibitions in the Czech Rep. and abroad (France, Greece, Netherlands, Switzerland, USA, Germany), the following may be pointed out: 172 Pictures and Drawings by Josef Wagner, Art Centre of Athens, Athens, Greece (1988), and Joseph Wagner rétrospective de 1958–1997, Palais Bénédicte, Fécamp, France (1999).

== Literature ==
Jan M. Tomeš: Josef Wagner. Athens Wagner Club, Athens, Greece. 1988.

== Exhibition Catalogues ==
- Josef Wagner, Pictures, Drawings. Státní galerie výtvarného umění v Chebu (State Gallery of Fine Arts in Cheb), Alšova jihočeská galerie Hluboká nad Vltavou (Aleš Gallery of South Bohemia in Hluboká nad Vltavou), Galerie Vysočiny Jihlava (The Gallery of Vysočina Region in Jihlava) 1993
- Josef Wagner–Drawings, Galerie výtvarného umění v Chebu (State Gallery of Fine Arts in Cheb), 2004-5
- Josef Wagner–Pictures and Graphics from Private Collections, Zámecký Skleník Boskovice (The Glasshouse of Boskovice Chateau) and Galerie města Trutnova (Gallery of the Town of Trutnov) 2005.
- Film document: Můj Parthenon jsou Holešovice (Holešovice is My Parthenon) (Česká televize 1997, directed by Rudolf Adler)
