= Karol Hiller =

Polish painter

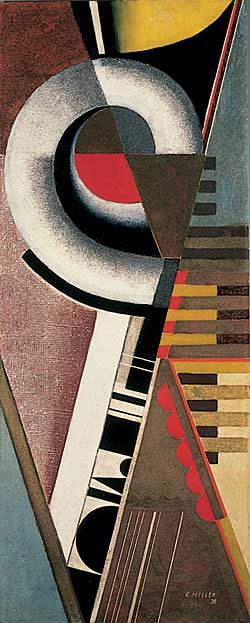
Composition with a spiral, 1928

Karol Hiller (6 December 1891 – December 1939) was a Polish painter. He was one of the main representatives of the Polish constructivist movement in the 1920s.

== Biography ==
Hiller was born in Łódź. He studied Chemistry in Darmstadt and Civil engineering in Warsaw until he was drafted into the army in 1916. After the war he ended up in Kiev, where he studied art at the Academy of Fine Arts. In 1921 he returned to Łódź where he cofounded the Association of Visual Artists . From 1930 to 1938 he participated in a series of exhibitions in Łódź and Warsaw organized by the Institute of Art Propaganda. In the 1930s he abandoned the flat constructivist geometry and created more abstract compositions with biological forms. In December 1939 he was executed by the Gestapo in a forest near Lućmierz.
