= Tadeusz Rolke =

Polish photographer (1929–2025)

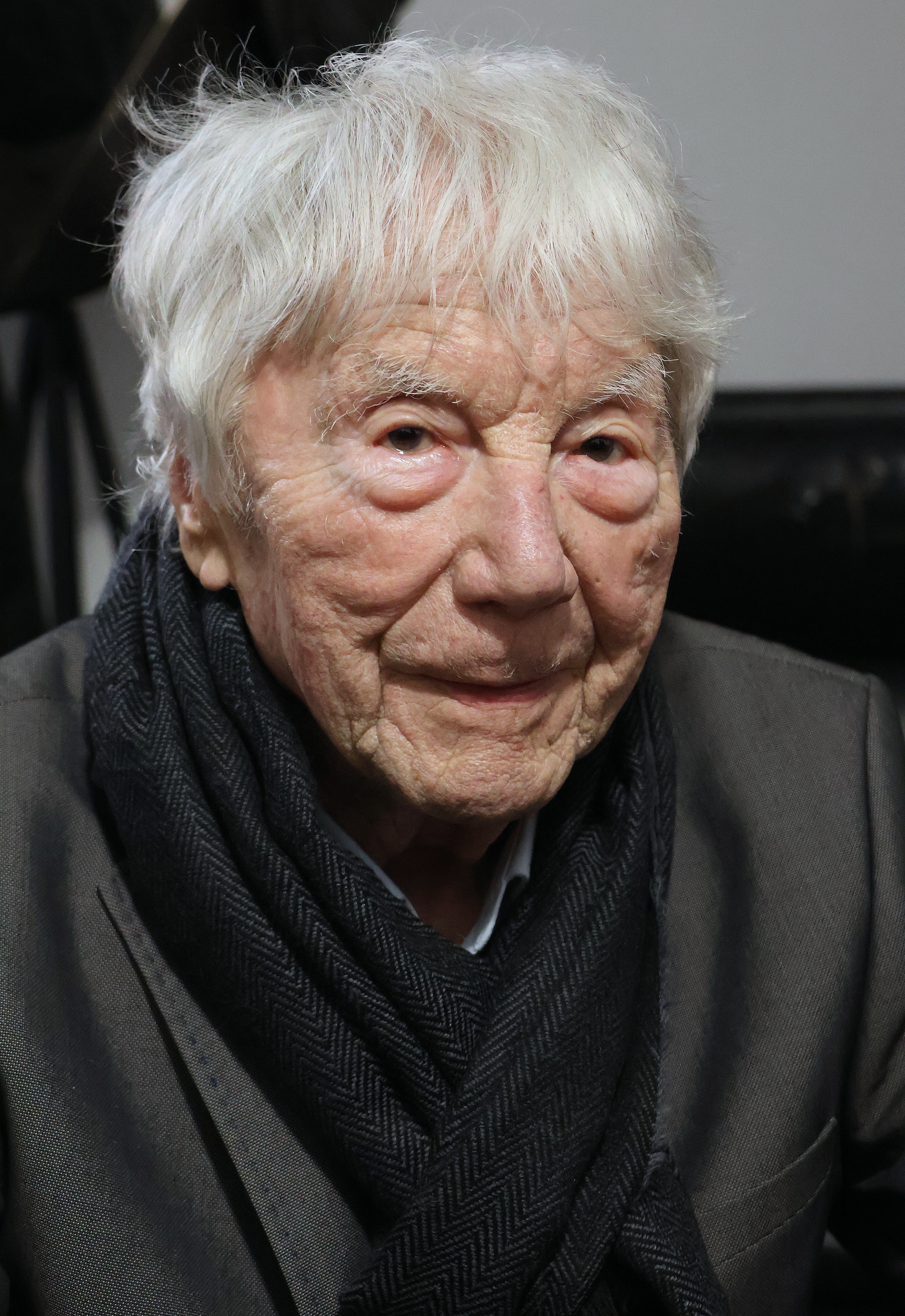
- Rolke in 2025
- Born: 24 May 1929; Warsaw, Poland
- Died: 14 July 2025 (aged 96)
- Known for: photography

Tadeusz Rolke (24 May 1929 – 14 July 2025) was a Polish photographer.

== Biography ==
He was the son of Tadeusz and Zofia Rolke; younger brother of Andrzej. His father died in 1932. He started education at the elementary school (Szkoła Heleny Chełmońskiej). After the outbreak of World War II he continued underground education.

He took active part in the Warsaw Uprising, fighting the Nazi occupants in Sadyba. He was then deported to forced labor into the Third Reich; he dug trenches and anti-tank ditches. In April 1945 he returned to the destroyed Warsaw. In May 1945 he enrolled to the Tadeusz Reytan High School. He passed the matura in 1949.

== Selected exhibitions ==
- Fotografowałem lata sześćdziesiąte i nie tylko... (CSW Zamek Ujazdowski, 1997)
- Sąsiadka, with Chris Niedenthal (Galeria Zachęta, 2001)
- Fischmarkt (Kunstverein Hamburg, 2002)
- Rock’n’Rolke (Fundacja Galerii Foksal, 2006)
- Wszystko jest fotografią (CSW Zamek Ujazdowski, 2009)
- Jutro będzie lepiej (Galeria LeGuern, 2013)

Source.

== Books ==
- Amerykańscy artyści – Polska 1964–1965. Wystawa w Ambasadzie Amerykańskiej w Warszawie. 24 maja – 10 czerwca 1965, author of photographs; exhibition catalogue; US Embassy, Warsaw 1965;
- Tadeusz Rolke – fotografowałem lata sześćdziesiąte [i nie tylko] / I photographed the 60`s (and not only). 17.06–14.09.1997 Piwnice Zamku / the Castle Celler, exhibition catalogue; CSW Zamek Ujazdowski, Warsaw 1997;
- Edward Krasiński, author of photographs; Galeria Arsenał, Białystok 1998, ISBN 8386662816;
- Tadeusz Rolke Fotografie 1944–2005 / Photography 1944–2005, edited by Beata Majchrowska; Fundacja Galerii Foksal – Revolver, Warsaw – Frankfurt am Man, 2006, ISBN 83-89302-03-9;
- Kobieta to..., Biblioteka "Gazety Wyborczej", Warsaw 2008, ISBN 978-83-7552-180-1;
- Tu byliśmy. Ostatnie ślady zaginionej kultury, edition.fotoTAPETA 2008, ISBN 978-83-61072-03-4;
- Tadeusz Rolke, Wydawnictwo BoSz, Szymanik i wspólnicy, Olszanica 2015, ISBN 978-83-75762-25-9;
- Tadeusz Rolke. Moja namiętność. Mistrz fotografii rozmawia z Małgorzatą Purzyńską, Wydawnictwo Agora, Warsaw 2016;
- Tadeusz Rolke. Fotografie warszawskie, Dom Spotkań z Historią, Warsaw 2019, ISBN 978-83-66068-07-0;
- Tadeusz Rolke. W kolorze = in colour, Wydawnictwo BoSz, Olszanica 2019, ISBN 978-83-75764-50-5;
- Tu byliśmy. Tadeusz Rolke, Wydawnictwo S he for Art, Warsaw 2021, ISBN 978-83-96181-60-2.
