= Totaleinsatz =

Totaleinsatz (German: "total deployment" or "comprehensive mobilisation") refers to forced labour under German rule during World War II during the German occupation of Czechoslovakia. A total of 400,000 Czechs worked as forced labour in Germany. This was a subset of the Arbeitseinsatz for German men, but with ambiguity as to the status of Czechs under the "Protectorate" of Bohemia and Moravia. As 'inferior Slavs', Czech labourers were generally treated worse than the French and Dutch, but not as badly as de facto slave labourers like the Ukrainian Ostarbeiter.
