= P (Nazi symbol) =

Sign for Polish workers during the NS-Regime in Nazi Germany

Polish-forced-workers' Zivilarbeiter badge

The "P" symbol or "P" badge was introduced on 8 March 1940 by the Nazi Germany General Government in relation to the requirement that Polish workers (Zivilarbeiter) used during World War II as forced laborers in Germany (following the German invasion and occupation of Poland in 1939) display a visible symbol marking their ethnic origin. The symbol was introduced with the intent to be used as a cloth patch, which indeed was the most common form, but also reproduced on documents (through stamps) and posters. The badge was intended to be humiliating, and like the similar Jewish symbol, can be seen as a badge of shame.

== Design and usage ==
The design was introduced in the Polish decrees (laws concerning Polish workers in Germany) on 8 March 1940. The symbol was a diamond with sides of five centimeters. The border (about half a centimetre wide) and the letter P (two and a half centimetres tall) were violet, while the inside of the symbol was yellow. The letter "P" badge was to be worn on the right breast of every garment worn. Those who did not obey the rules were subject to a fine of up to 150 Reichsmarks and arrested with a possible penalty of six weeks' detention.

The choice of color and shape might have been chosen to avoid any association with the national symbols of Poland. It was the first official, public badge-like mark intended for identification of individuals based on their racial or ethnic origin (or other social characteristics) introduced in Nazi Germany, preceding the better-known "Jewish yellow star" badge introduced a year later, in September 1941.

In January 1945 the Central Office for Reich Security proposed a new design for a Polish badge, a yellow ear of corn on a red and white label, but it was never implemented.

== Examples of usage ==
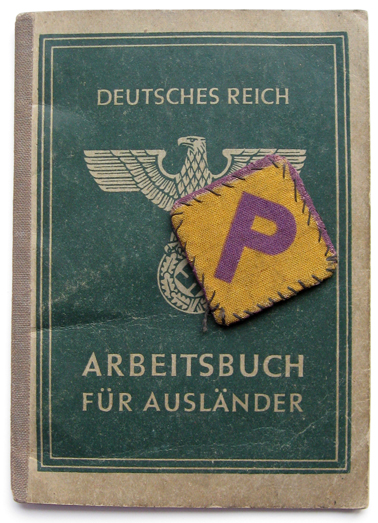
Arbeitsbuch Für Ausländer (Workbook for Foreigners)

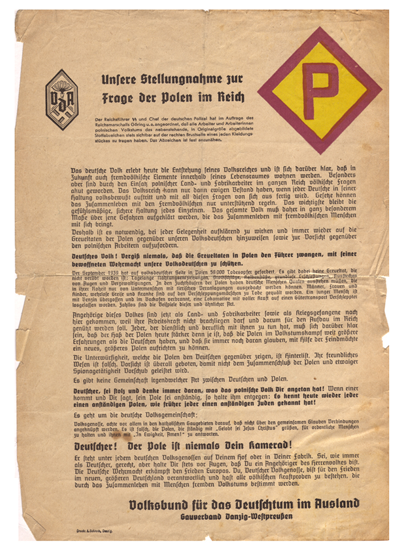
Poster published by Volksbund für das Deutschtum im Ausland

Left: Arbeitsbuch Für Ausländer (Workbook for Foreigners) identity document issued to a Polish Forced Labourer in 1942 together with a letter "P" patch that Poles were required to wear attached to their clothing.

Right: Anti-Polish poster published by Volksbund für das Deutschtum im Ausland (Association for 'Germanness' abroad) Gauverband Danzig Westpreußen (Association of the "shire or county", Gdansk, West Prussia)

== See also ==
- Other Nazi concentration camp badges
  - Black triangle (badge) – Nazi concentration camp badge for "asocials"
  - Blue triangle – Cloth emblems; part of the system of identification in Nazi camps
  - Brown triangle – Genocide of the Romani in Europe during World War II
  - Green triangle – Cloth emblems; part of the system of identification in Nazi camps
  - Pink triangle – Nazi concentration camp symbol for gay men and crossdressers, later adopted as an LGBTQ+ symbol
  - Red triangle (badge) – Symbol of anti-fascism
  - Yellow badge – Badge forced to be worn by Jews
- The Holocaust in Poland
- Yad Vashem – Israel's official memorial to the Jewish victims of the Holocaust
