= Organisation Todt =

Civil and military engineering group in Nazi Germany

Organisation Todt (OT)
- Pennant for Organisation Todt

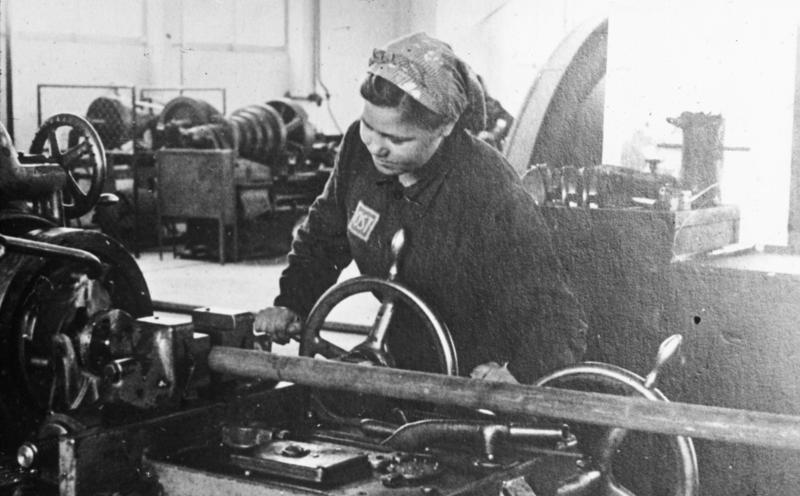
- Woman with Ostarbeiter OT badge at Auschwitz

Civil and military engineering overview
- Formed: 1933
- Dissolved: 1945
- Jurisdiction: Nazi Germany
- Civil and military engineering executives: Fritz Todt (1933–1942†), General Inspector of German Roadways Minister for Armaments and Munitions; Albert Speer (1942–1945), Minister of Armaments and Munitions

Organisation Todt (OT; [ʔɔʁɡanizaˈtsi̯oːn toːt]) was a civil and military engineering organisation in Nazi Germany from 1933 to 1945, named for its founder, Fritz Todt, an engineer and senior member of the Nazi Party. The organisation was responsible for a huge range of engineering projects both in Nazi Germany and in occupied territories from France to the Soviet Union during the Second World War. The organisation became notorious for using forced labour. From 1943 until 1945 during the late phase of the Third Reich, OT administered all construction of concentration camps to supply forced labour to industry.

There were more than 185,000 deaths of forced laborers on OT projects. Contrary to previous assumptions, research has revealed that death rates were high when the OT exercised a large degree of control over prisoners.

== Overview ==
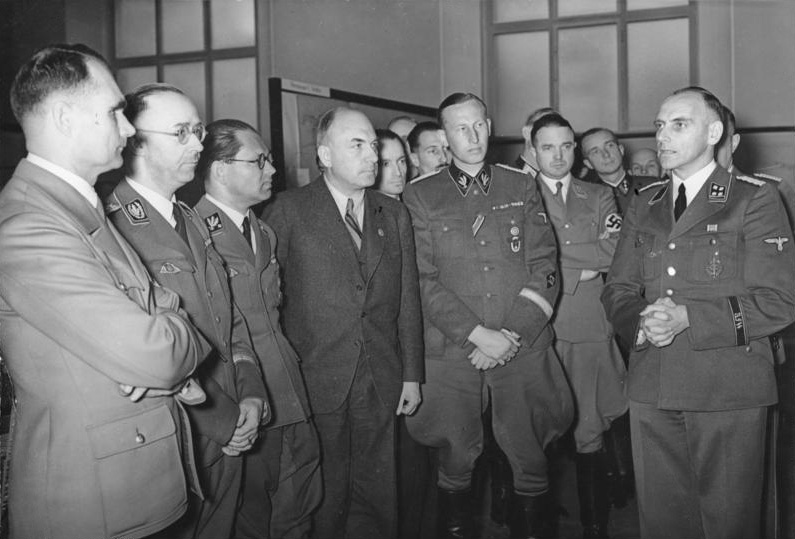
From left: Rudolf Hess, Heinrich Himmler, Philipp Bouhler, Fritz Todt and Reinhard Heydrich listen to Konrad Meyer at a Generalplan Ost exhibition in Berlin, 20 March 1941.

The history of the organisation can be divided into three phases. From 1933 to 1938, before the organisation existed, Fritz Todt's primary post was that of the General Inspector of German Roadways (Generalinspektor für das deutsche Straßenwesen) and his primary responsibility, the construction of the Autobahn network. He was able to draw on "conscripted" (i.e., compulsory) labour, from within Germany, through the Reich Labour Service (Reichsarbeitsdienst, RAD).

The second period lasted from 1938, when the Organisation Todt group proper was created, until February 1942, when Todt died in an aeroplane crash. After the invasion of Poland, Todt was named the Minister for Armaments and Munitions in 1940 (Reichsminister für Bewaffnung und Munition), and the projects of the OT became almost exclusively military. The huge increase in the demand for labour created by the various military and paramilitary projects was satisfied by a series of expansions of the laws concerning compulsory service, which ultimately obligated all Germans to arbitrarily determined (i.e., effectively unlimited) compulsory labour for the state: Zwangsarbeit. From 1938 to 1940, more than 1.75 million Germans were conscripted into labour service. From 1940 to 1942, Organisation Todt began its reliance on Gastarbeitnehmer ('guest workers'), Militärinternierte ('military internees'), Zivilarbeiter ('civilian workers'), Ostarbeiter ('Eastern workers'), and Hilfswillige ('volunteer') POW workers.

The third period lasted from 1942 until the end of the war in 1945, when Albert Speer succeeded Todt in office and the OT was absorbed into the renamed and expanded Reich Ministry of Armaments and War Production. Approximately 1.4 million labourers were in the service of the organisation. One per cent were Germans rejected from military service and 1.5% were concentration camp prisoners; the rest were prisoners of war and forced labourers from occupied countries. All were effectively treated as slaves and existed in the complete and arbitrary service of the totalitarian state. Many did not survive the work or the war.

== Autobahn construction, 1933–1938 ==
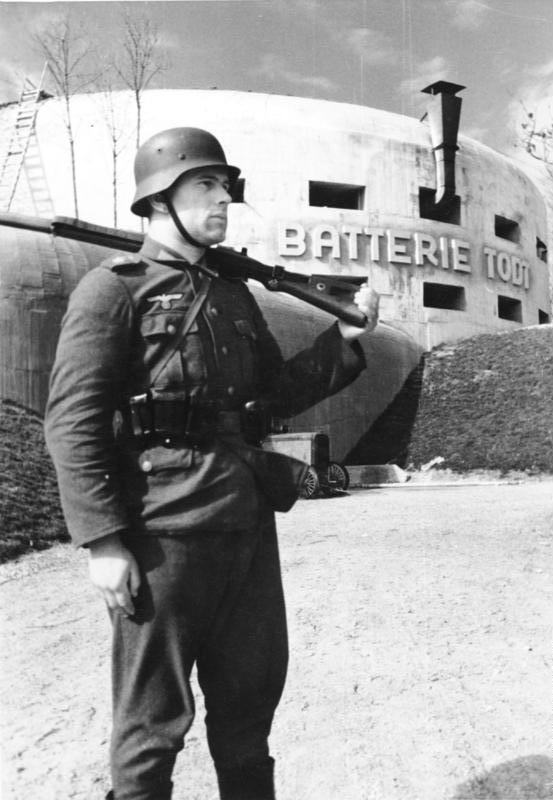
German soldier in front of part of the OT-built Atlantic Wall at Cap Gris Nez, France

The autobahn concept had its beginnings in the efforts of a private consortium, the HaFraBa (Verein zur Vorbereitung der Autostraße Hansestädte-Frankfurt-Basel), initiated during 1926 for the purpose of building a high-speed highway between northern Germany and Basel, in Switzerland. While the idea did not originate with the Nazis, Adolf Hitler issued a decree establishing a Reichsautobahnen project for an entire network of highways, issued on 27 June 1933. He made it a vastly more ambitious public project and the responsibility was given to Fritz Todt as the newly named Inspector General of German Roadways.

By 1934, Todt had succeeded in elevating his office to near cabinet rank. Todt was an extremely capable administrator, and by 1938 the organisation had built more than 3,000 km (1,900 mi) of the roadway. The Autobahn project became one of the show pieces of the Nazi regime. In that period, Todt had also put together the administrative framework of what would become the Organisation Todt.

Initially, the Autobahn project relied on the open labour market as a source of workers. Germany was at this time still recovering from the effects of the Great Depression and there was no shortage of available labour. As the economy recovered and the supply of labour became a more serious issue, the OT was able to draw on conscripted (i.e., compulsory) workers, from within Germany through the Reich Labour Service (RAD) from 1935. As per the law of 26 June 1935, all male Germans between the ages of 18 and 25 were required to perform six months of state service. During this period, the work was compensated, at a rate slightly greater than that of unemployment assistance. The working conditions of the labour force would change drastically for the worse over the course of the following ten years.

== Organisation "Todt", 1938–1942 ==
The OT was not given an official name until Hitler bestowed one soon after coming to power in 1933. During 1938 Todt initiated the Organisation Todt proper as a consortium of administrative offices which Todt had established in the course of the Autobahn project, private companies as subcontractors and the primary source of technical engineering expertise, and the Labour Service as the source of manpower. He was appointed by Hitler as a plenipotentiary for labour for the second four-year plan, decreasing Göring's role. Investment in civil engineering work was reduced greatly.

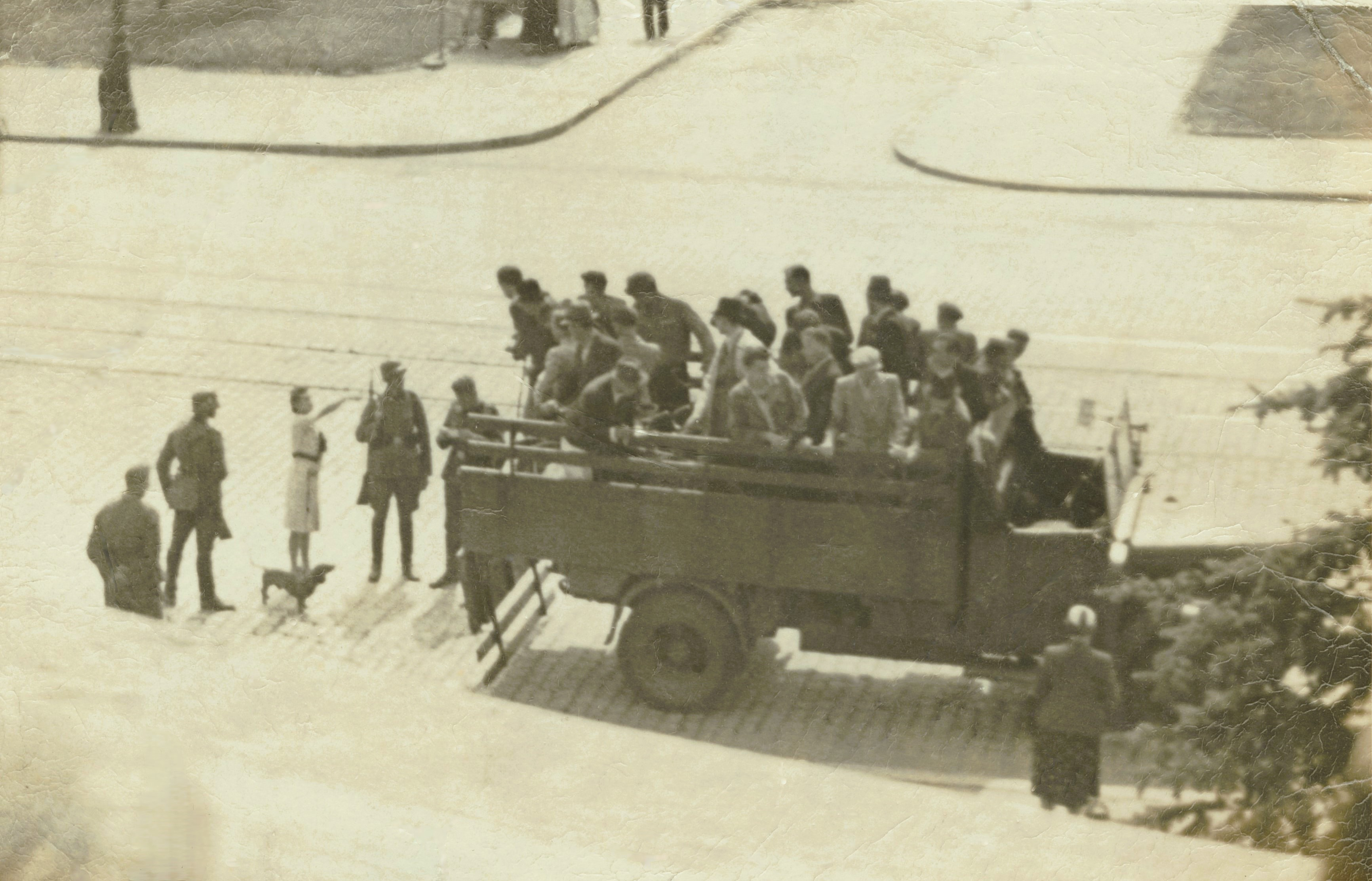
Street round-up (Polish łapanka [waˈpanka]) of random civilians to be deported to Germany for forced labour; Warsaw's Żoliborz district, 1941

Between 1939 and 1943, in contrast to the period from 1933 to 1938, fewer than 1,000 km (620 mi) of roadway were added to the Autobahn network. Emphasis shifted to military efforts. The first major project involved the Westwall (known in English as the Siegfried Line), built opposite the French Maginot Line and serving a similar purpose. Correspondingly, Todt himself was named Reich Minister of Armaments and Munitions in 1940. In 1941, Todt and his organisation were further charged with a project even larger: construction of the Atlantic Wall, to fortify the coasts of occupied France, the occupied Netherlands, Belgium, Denmark, and Norway. Included with this project were fortifications on the British Channel Islands, which were occupied by Nazi Germany from 30 June 1940 to 9 May 1945. The only camps on British soil operated by the OT were on the Channel Islands; two of these OT camps were given to the management of the SS from March 1943, converting them into the Alderney concentration camps.

Fritz Todt died in an aeroplane crash on 8 February 1942, soon after a meeting with Hitler in East Prussia. Todt had become convinced that the war on the eastern front could not be won and thought himself independent enough to say as much to Hitler. As a result, some speculation exists that Todt's death was a covert assassination, but this has never been substantiated.

== Under Albert Speer, 1942–1945 ==
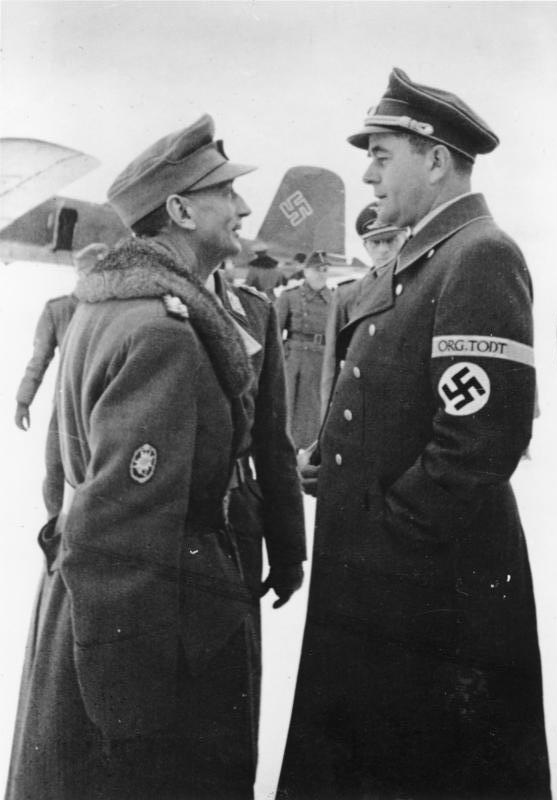
Eduard Dietl and Albert Speer, at Rovaniemi Airport, Finland, December 1943

Todt was succeeded by Albert Speer as Minister of Armaments and Munitions, and de facto manager of the Organisation Todt. Despite Todt's death, the OT continued to exist as an engineering organisation and was given more assignments. At the beginning of 1943, in addition to its continuing work on the Atlantic Wall, the organisation also undertook the construction of launch platforms in northern France for the V-1 flying bomb and V-2 rocket. During the summer of that year, German war efforts became increasingly defensive, and the organisation was directed to construct air-raid shelters, repair bombed buildings in German urban areas, and construct underground refineries and armaments factories, also termed Project Riese.

In 1943, the organisation was administratively incorporated into Albert Speer's Ministry of Armaments and War Production. Speer's concerns, in the context of an increasingly desperate Germany, in which all production had been severely affected by materials and manpower shortages and by Allied bombing, ranged over almost the whole of the German war-time economy. Speer managed to increase production significantly, at the cost of a vastly increased reliance on compulsory labour. This applied as well to the labour force of the OT.

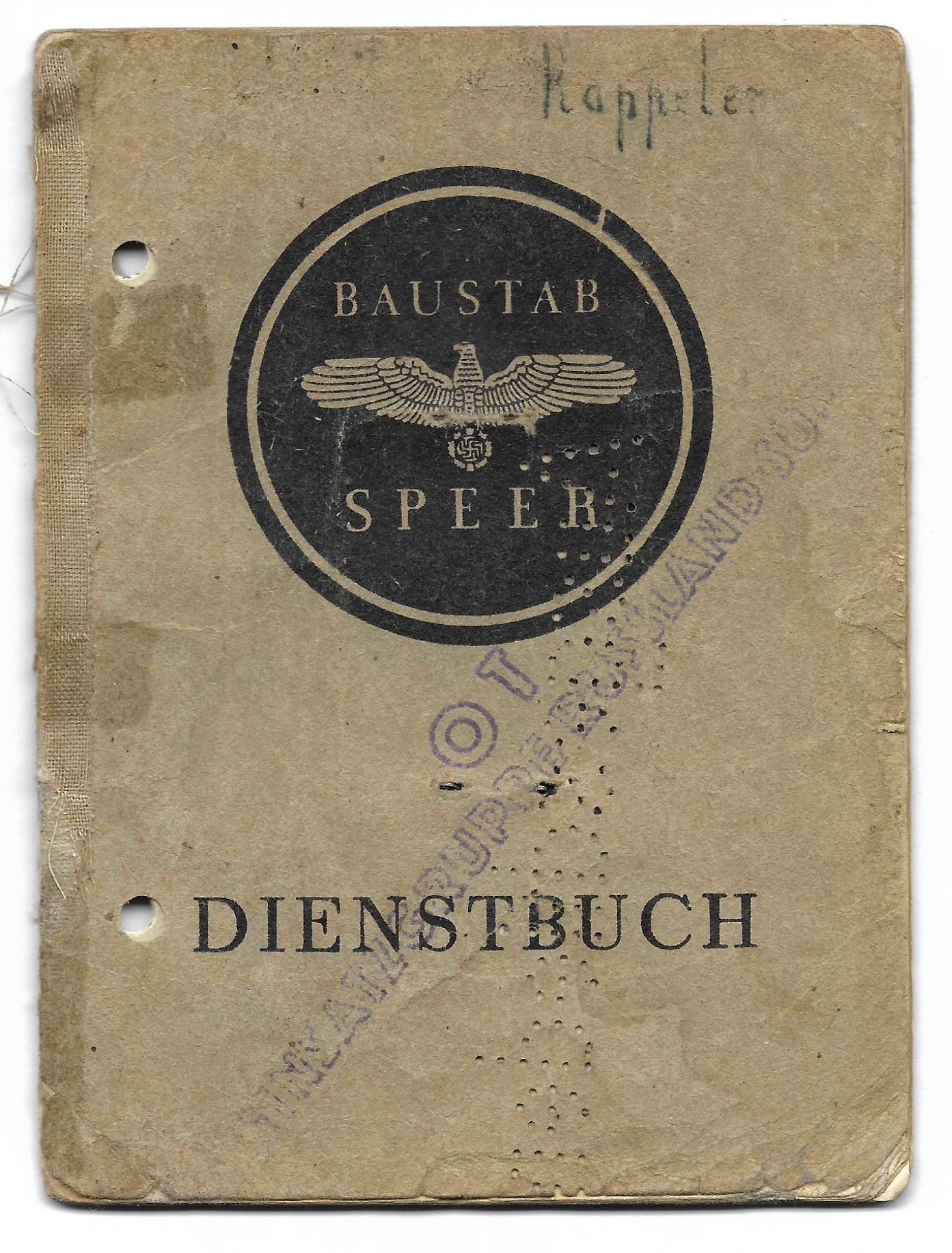
An Organisation Todt member's service-book from the war.

== OT contractors ==
The OT was a co-operative effort of the German government and the German construction industry; the former supplied the manpower and the material, the latter supplied the technical know-how in the form of individual contractors (OT-Firmen) with their staff and equipment. Up to about 1942, the construction companies dominated the OT, but after Speer became its director, the government's control of the organisation increased through standardised contracts and uniform pay scales. The volunteer contracts with the OT were later augmented with compulsory contracts, forcing construction companies to work for the OT. The construction company contracted became a self-contained unit within the OT, composed of technical and administrative staff with the skill and equipment necessary to execute the construction tasks assigned to it. Smaller companies were hence combined to form an Arbeitsgemeinschaft. The organisation of OT contractors was standardised through instructions issued by Wirtschaftsgruppe Bauindustrie, the German construction industry association. Among the OT contractors were also construction companies in occupied Europe. French, Danish, and Norwegian companies contracted with German companies as sub-contractors for OT building projects.

There were several kinds of contracts between OT and OT contractors. The most important were:

- Cost reimbursement contract, where the materiel and labour was supplied by the company. It allowed a commission of 4½% as the profit of the contractor.
- Efficiency output contracts, where the materiel and labour was supplied by the OT. The profit was computed on the basis of the wages paid to the contractor's own staff. This was the dominant type of contract from late 1942.

== Organisation ==
=== Central organisation ===
In 1942 a centralised organisation of the OT was created when Speer became Reichsminister. A new HQ in Berlin, Amt OTZ, was created with Ministerialdirigent Franz Xaver Dorsch as chief of staff. It merged during 1944 with Amt Bau-OT to form Amt Bau-OT Zentrale directed by Speer, and with Dorsch as chief representative of Speer as a minister, and as general plenipotentiary for construction.

Amt Bau-OT Zentrale

- Planning and construction
- Supply
- Manpower and social policy
- Chief Engineer
- Motor Vehicles
- Administration and personnel
- Front area personnel
- Medical services
- Communications
- Central committee for construction

=== Administrative units ===
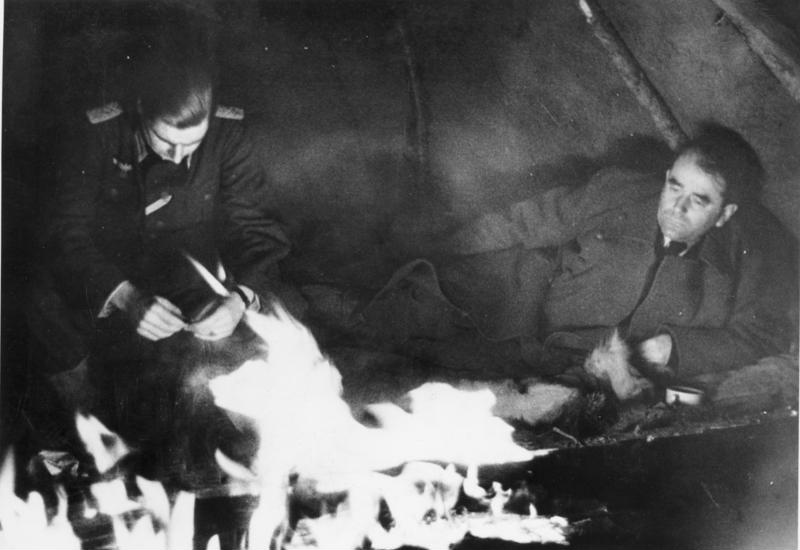
Albert Speer (right) in Finland during the winter of 1943–1944

Area control staffs Army Group level

- Einsatzgruppen
  - Construction
  - Technical
  - Supply
  - Administration and personnel
  - Front line personnel
  - Medical services

German (national) and foreign

- OT-Einsatzgruppe Italien
- OT-Einsatzgruppe Ost (Kiev)
- OT-Einsatzgruppe Reich (Berlin)
- OT-Einsatzgruppe Südost (Belgrade)
- OT-Einsatzgruppe West (Paris)
- OT-Einsatzgruppe Wiking (Oslo)
- OT-Einsatzgruppe Russland Nord (Tallinn)

Area control staffs Army level

- Einsatz

Basic construction sector

- Oberbauleitung under Oberbauleiter.

Sub-sector

- Bauleitung

Local control

- Abschnittsbauleitung

Construction site

- Baustelle

Intra German

- Deutschland I ("Tannenberg") (Rastenburg)
- Deutschland II (Berlin)
- Deutschland III ("Hansa") (Essen)
- Deutschland IV ("Kyffhäuser") (Weimar)
- Deutschland V (Heidelberg)
- Deutschland VI (Munich)
- Deutschland VII (Prague)
- Deutschland VIII ("Alpen") (Villach)

=== Schutzkommando ===
The Schutzkommando was the security guards of the OT, whose mission was to maintain discipline and order among the foreign workers, as well as guarding the OT construction camps, buildings, and other property against enemy activities and theft. During marches the SK guarded the foreign workers in order to prevent escapes; the ratio of one SK-man per twenty foreign workers was used normally.

Organisation

- SK-Kameradschaft (squad of 8-12 men)
- SK-Zug (platoon of 35-60 men)
- SK-Bereitschaft (company of 120-150 men)
- SK-Abteilung (battalion); one or more per Einsatzgruppe.

Auxiliary field gendarmery
Two special organisations existed within the SK:

- Ordnungskommando (Order Command), stationary auxiliaries to the Feldgendarmerie.
- Streifendienst (Patrol Service), mobile Auxiliaries to the Feldgendarmerie

== Auxiliary organisations ==
Flag of the Transportkorps Speer

The NSKK supplied motor vehicle transportation for the OT until 1944. The role of the NSKK began in 1938, with the NSKK-Transportbrigade Todt in charge of motor transportation for the construction of the Siegfried Line. In 1939, NSKK-Transportbrigade Speer was organised and put in charge of the motor transportation for the air base constructions under Baustab Speer within the OT. Foreign drivers were, however, recruited into the Legion Speer, since they – seen as inferior – could not be members of the NSKK, which was a sub-organisation of the Nazi Party. In 1942, Transportbrigade Todt, Transportbrigade Speer, and Legion Speer, was subsumed into an umbrella organisation, Transportgruppe Todt, which in 1944 was made into an organisation independent of the NSKK, the Transportkorps Speer. Inland waterways transportation was since 1937 the scope of the Transportflotte Speer, the Speer river fleet.

== Forced labour ==
Organisation Todt was notorious for using forced labour. Most of the so-called "volunteer" Soviet POW workers were assigned to the Organisation Todt. The history of the forced labour by Nazi Germany has three main phases:

- Organisation Todt was preceded by the office of General Inspector of German Roadways (Generalinspektor für das deutsche Straßenwesen), operating between 1933 and 1938, responsible primarily for the construction of the German Autobahn network. The organisation was able to use "conscripted" (i.e. compulsory) labour from within Germany through the Reich Labour Service (RAD).
- The period from 1938 until 1942, after Operation Barbarossa, when the Organisation Todt proper was initiated and utilised on the Eastern front. The huge increase in the demand for labour created by the various military and paramilitary projects was satisfied by a series of expansions of the laws on compulsory service, which ultimately obligated all Germans to arbitrarily determined (i.e. effectively unlimited) compulsory labour for the state: Zwangsarbeit. From 1938 to 1940, over 1.75 million Germans were conscripted into labour service. From 1940 to 1942, Organisation Todt began its reliance on Gastarbeitnehmer (guest workers), Militärinternierte (military internees), civilian workers, Eastern workers, and "volunteer" POW workers.
- The period from 1942 until the end of the war, with approximately 1.4 million labourers in the service of the Organisation Todt. Overall, 1% were Germans rejected from military service and 1.5% were concentration camp prisoners; the rest were prisoners of war and compulsory labourers from occupied countries. All were effectively treated as slaves and existed in the complete and arbitrary service of a totalitarian state. Many did not survive the work or the war. By the end of the war, the Reichsarbeitsdienst service for Germans had been reduced to six weeks of perfunctory military training and all available conscript German manpower diverted to military units and direct military support organisations. From the beginning of 1942 at the latest, their place was increasingly taken by prisoners of war and compulsory labourers from occupied countries. Foreign nationals and POWs were often, somewhat euphemistically, referred to as "foreign workers" (Fremdarbeiter). During 1943 and 1944, these were further augmented by concentration camp and other prisoners. Beginning in the autumn of 1944, between 10,000 and 20,000 half-Jews (Mischlinge) and persons related to Jews by marriage were recruited into special units.

== Personnel structure ==
All members of the Organisation Todt, even forced labourers, with the exception of Jews, were regarded as Wehrmachtsgefolge, that is combatants by the law of war. Of these, only the German personnel were regarded as being Wehrmacht Auxiliaries (i.e., belonging to the Wehrmachtgefolgschaft). The Frontarbeiter (front workers) were German, Volksdeutsche, or Nordic members of the OT. They swore an oath of fidelity to Hitler, wore uniforms, and were armed. The mean age of this group was about 45–50 years. An Einsatzarbeiter was a foreign worker that swore an oath of allegiance, wore a uniform, but were not normally armed. They could not include Czechs, Poles, Jews, or Communists. At the end of the war, their designation became OT-Legionäre. OT-Eigenes Personal was the organic personnel of the OT, as opposed to the OT-Firmenangehörige, employees of the contractors working for the OT.

At wars end, all Org Todt members received blanket amnesty from the Western Allies. Many went on to serve in the post-war British and U.S. Labor Services in occupied Germany before emigrating to Britain, Australia, Canada and the United States. The U.S. Labor Service was considered the forerunner of the new German army. The Organisation Todt itself was found not guilty of war crimes at Nuremberg, although its leader Albert Speer served 20 years in Spandau Prison after admitting his crimes against humanity.

Categories

- OT-Eigenes Personal consisted of administrative, supervisory, and clerical staff, recruited through voluntary employment of German citizens, or through conscription of Germans and Volksdeutsche, as well as French citizens working for OT in France, and also included Frontarbeiter and Einsatzarbeiter.
- OT-Firmenangehörige consisted of the German permanent employees of the contractors. as well as conscripts serving with the contracted companies. These employees received uniforms, were given a rank, and were supposed to be given a briefer period of military training. They also included Frontarbeiter and Einsatzarbeiter.
- Foreign workers, who were either Hilfswillige, East European volunteers, or forced Labourers of many nationalities.

Classification of personnel according to nationality

- Germans and Volksdeutsche. Frontarbeiter in OT uniform.
- Nordics (English, Norwegians, Swedes, Finns, Dutch, Danes, Flemings, Swiss). Frontarbeiter in OT uniform if volunteers. Civilian clothing for local workers in Scandinavia. Hilfsarbeiter if conscripted.
- Latins and Slovaks. Einsatzarbeiter or Hilfsarbeiter in local uniforms.
- Baltics and Balkans. Hilfsarbeiter.
- Russians, Poles, Czech. Hilfswilliger or Zwangsarbeiter.
- Jews. Zwangsarbeiter.
- Stateless German Speakers. "Auslander". Frontarbeiter in OT uniform.

== Crimes against humanity and prosecution ==
During the construction of the Blood Road in Norway, more than 10,000 slave labourers from eastern Europe and some hundred German political prisoners were worked to death as part of the "vernichtung durch arbeit" ("annihilation by labour"). Several SS guards and local collaborators were sentenced to prison and death after the war in trials in Belgrade and Oslo. The head of the responsible OT unit for Scandinavia, Willi Henne, was extradited to the Soviet Union and served 10 years as a prisoner of war before returning to Hessen in West Germany.

While building the main military road for Germany's invasion of the Soviet Union, the so-called "Durchgangsstrasse IV" or Road of the SS from Lemberg to Donetsk, approximately 20,000 Jews were worked to death or shot dead in Nazi-occupied Poland. and 25,000 in German-occupied Ukraine, as well approximately 50,000 Soviet prisoners of war. The road was issued by the SS that also rented slave labour and half-free labour to OT. OT subcontracted to German building companies and German engineers oversaw work of the more than 2000 km road.

The survivor Arnold Daghani published his memoirs in 1960 in German translation, accusing companies like Dohrmann and others to have assisted SS, SD and auxiliary troops in the deliberate killing of slave workers. A two-decade-long process against the main culprits with 1,500 witnesses interviewed resulted in not a single conviction, leading Daghani to call the process "merely a farce, a meaningless gesture. None of the OT personnel were sentenced to prison in the Nuremberg Trials or other postwar trials in Germany. Despite a British Secret Service report stating that "Supervisory assignments in OT were generally reserved for Old Party Fighters, Party members with influential connections, and more recently for older SS members in rapidly increasing numbers. [...] The result is that [...] in proportion it harbours at least in its permanent administrative staff, possibly more ardent Nazis than a regular formation of the Party.

== See also ==
- Deutsche Ausrüstungswerke (DAW) defence contractor owned and operated by the SS
- Forced labour under German rule during World War II
- Ispettorato Militare del Lavoro
