= Ispettorato Militare del Lavoro =

The Ispettorato Militare del Lavoro (ILM), informally called the Organizzazione Paladino or Azione Graziani, was an organization of the Italian Social Republic during World War II composed of volunteer labourers "to collaborate with the German authorities in repairing roads and railways, and in general carry out other work of either a civil or military nature." The organization was proposed by General Francesco Paladino. With German agreement, Marshal Rodolfo Graziani appointed Paladino its first director on 6 October 1943. Its headquarters was initially in Rome and it was under the authority of the ministry of defence.

The initial goal was to recruit 90,000 workers, but recruitment lagged expectations. There was competing recruitment by the German Organisation Todt (for work in Italy) and the Arbeitseinsatz (for work in Germany). By the spring of 1944, the Organizzazione Paladino consisted of 50 battalions divided into centurie. It employed 40,000 men. This was substantially less than the 120,000–286,000 Italians serving in the Organisation Todt in Italy. During the war, it suffered 100 dead and 560 wounded.
