= Transportflotte Speer =

- Company type: GmbH
- Industry: Shipping
- Founded: 1937
- Defunct: 1945
- Fate: Liquidated by order of the Allied Powers
- Headquarters: Berlin
- Key people: Professor Dr. Hettlage, director Grosskapitän Erik Seyd, operations manager
- Number of employees: 10,000

Transportflotte Speer was a government owned waterways transportation company in Nazi Germany. At its creation it was tasked with the transportation of building material on the German inland waterways. During the war, it became subordinated to the Ministry of Armaments, and was given extensive coastal and inland transportation missions in occupied Europe, mainly in the service of Organisation Todt. The company was named after Albert Speer.

== Creation ==
Transportflotte Speer was founded in 1937 with the task of transporting Swedish and Danish granite from the German coastal ports, to the major Nazi rebuilding projects in Berlin under Albert Speer, as inspector general of building and construction in the capital.

== During the war ==
After the outbreak of the war, the Transportflotte Speer was initially used for transporting coal and other supplies to Berlin. During Operation Sea Lion, its operational headquarters were moved to Groningen in the Netherlands, in order to make better use of Dutch sailors and shipping. In 1942, the Transportflotte Speer was given the mission to supply the Organisation Todt activities in Norway, Denmark and Finland. Personnel strength now rose to about 10,000 sailors, mainly Norwegians who were trained in Sandefjord. Allied bombings of the German rail and road networks, made the inland waterways increasingly more important. In 1944, the Transportflotte Speer had a fleet of more than 2,000 vessels, with a combined deplacement of 500,000 ton dwt. The company serviced 31 sea and canal ports in France, Belgium, the Netherlands, Germany, Denmark, Norway, Finland, Russia, Roumania and Italy.

== Norway ==
Transportflotte Speer was used for the transportation of building material and machinery for German military projects along the Norwegian coast. At the end of the war, the company had a fleet of more than 700 larger and smaller vessels in Norway, with an extensive administrative organization in many Norwegian ports.

== Ranks ==
Insignia	Ranks in the Transportflotte Speer	Comparative ranks in the Kriegsmarine
	Grosskapitän	Vizeadmiral
	Generalkapitän	Konteradmiral
	Kommodore	Kapitän zur See
	Stabskapitän	Fregattenkapitän
	Kapitän	Korvettenkapitän
	Hauptschiffsführer; Einsatzleiter	Kapitänleutnant
	Oberschiffsführer; Dienststellenleiter von grossere Dienststelle	Oberleutnant zur See
	Schiffsführer; Dienststellenleiter	Leutnant zur See
	Hauptbootsmann; Hauptverwaltungsführer; Oberinspektor	Oberbootsmann
	Oberbootsmann; Verwaltungsführer; Inspektor	Bootsmann
	Bootsmann geh. Fourier	Obermaat
	Unterbootsmann; Fourier; Buchhalter	Maat
	Hauptmatrose	Obergefreiter
	Obermatrose	Gefreiter
	Vollmatrose	Matrose
	Matrose	Matrose
