= Polish decrees =

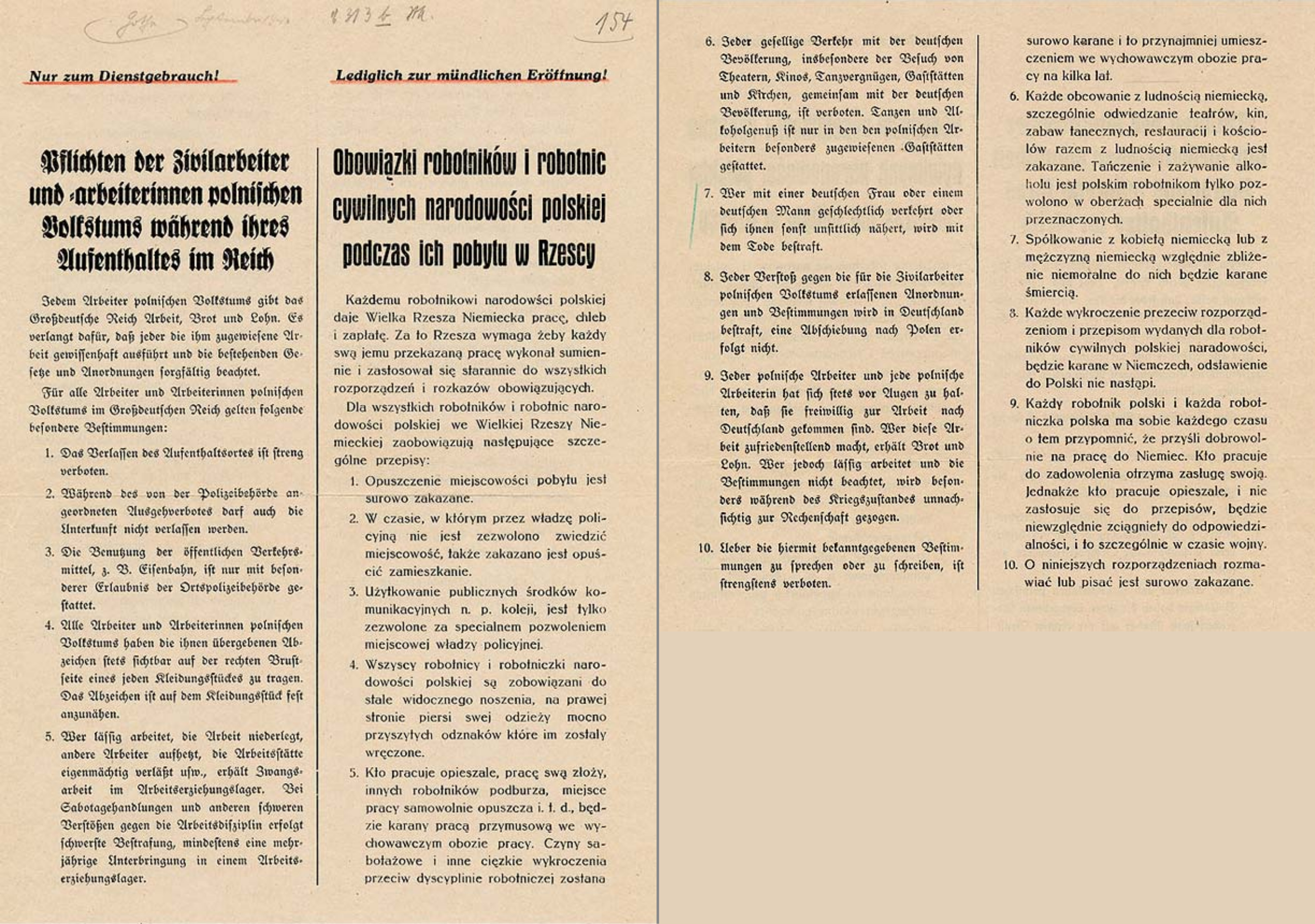
Poster in German and Polish describing "Obligations of Polish workers in Germany" including death sentence to every man and woman from Poland for sex with a German

Polish decrees, Polish directives or decrees on Poles (German: Polen-Erlasse, Polenerlasse) were the decrees of the Nazi Germany government announced on 8 March 1940 during World War II to regulate the working and living conditions of the Polish workers (Zivilarbeiter) used during World War II as forced laborers in Germany. The regulation intentionally supported and even created anti-Polish racism and discrimination on the grounds of ethnicity and racial background.

== Purpose ==
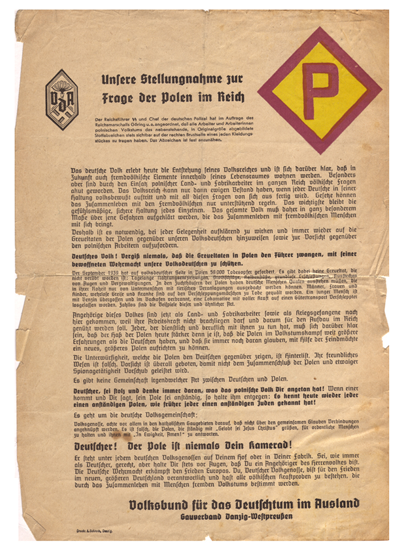
Anti-Polish poster published by Volksbund für das Deutschtum im Ausland (Association for 'Germanness' abroad) Gauverband Danzig Westpreußen (Association of the "shire or county", Gdansk, West Prussia)

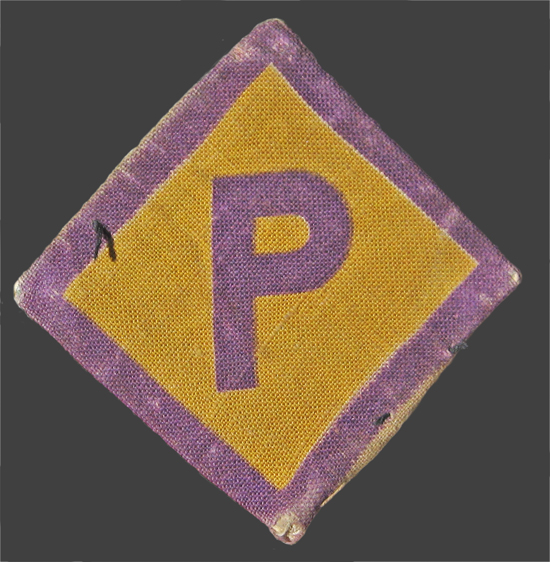
Polish-forced-workers' badge

The decrees were an important step towards codifying Nazi Germany policies and laws on foreign forced labor. They were meant to provide a legal basis for discriminating against Poles, fulfilling at the same time Nazi ideology and the needs of the Nazi economy. The racist notion of the inferiority of the forced laborers and prisoners of war from Poland when compared with the German master race was a prominent feature of the orders. The decrees, which recommended that examples of severe punishment be demonstrated to workers early on, were also aiming at clearly distinguishing the new conditions from pre-war voluntary seasonal labor.

== Specific content ==
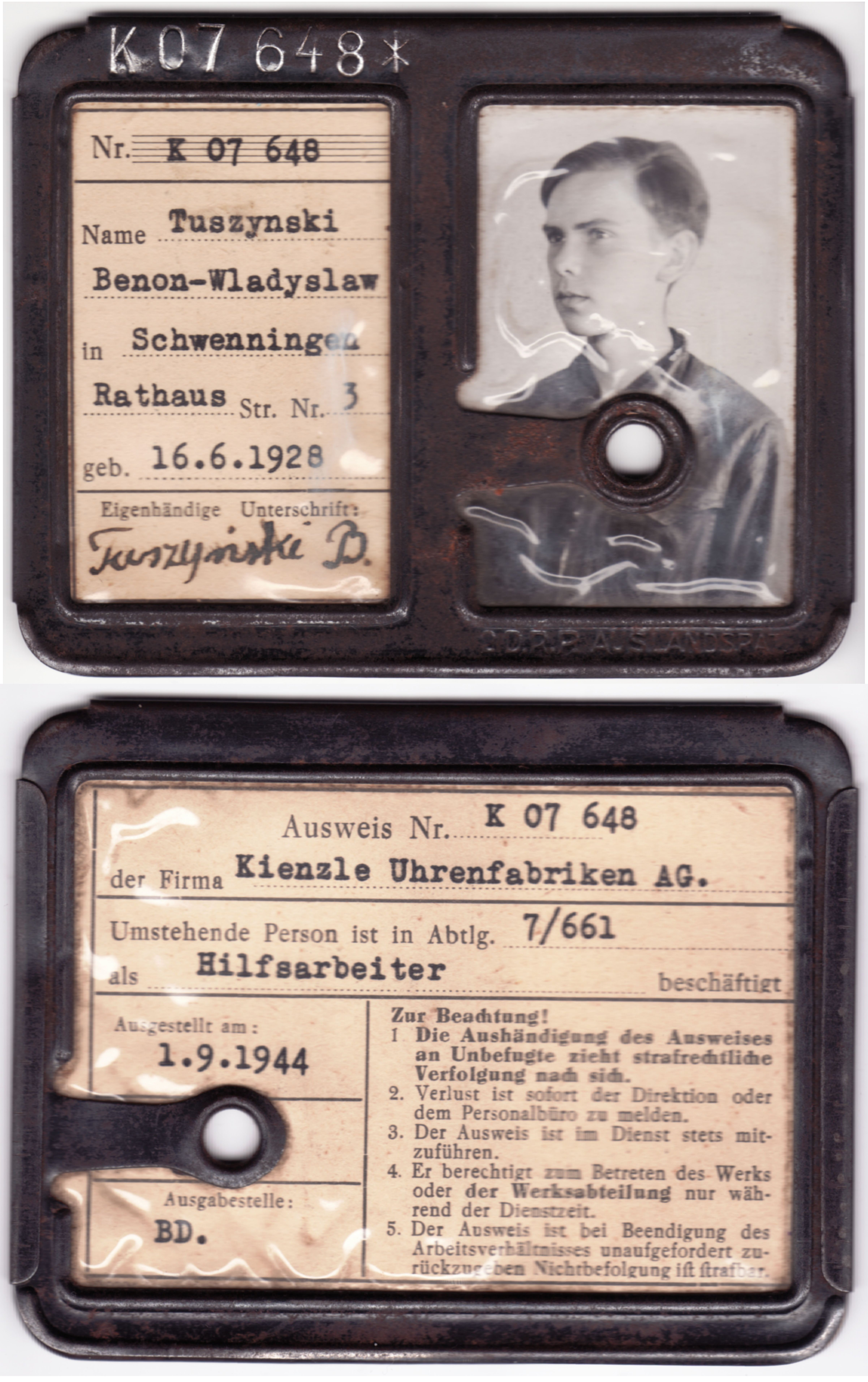
Kienzle Uhren factory ID card, from 1944, of 16 years old forced labor worker from Poland

Polish workers were required to wear a clearly visible letter "P" badge, in addition to a work permit with a photo. The letter "P" badge was to be to worn on the right breast of every garment worn. Those who did not obey the rules were subject to a fine of up to 150 RM [Reichsmarks] and arrested with a possible penalty of six weeks detention. They should also be kept away from German "cultural life" and "places of amusement" (this included churches and restaurants). Sexual relations between Poles and Germans was prohibited as Rassenschande (race defilement), and so it was recommended that the same numbers of Polish males and females should be recruited, or that brothels should be set up. To keep them segregated from the German population, they were often housed in segregated barracks behind barbed wire. Mobility of workers, housed as far away as possible from Germans, was to be restricted, hence they were barred from using public transportation. They were also affected by after dark curfew. Wages paid to Polish workers, in the minority of cases where they were paid at all, were much lower than those paid to the German workers, even through they had to work longer hours. Polish workers were also to receive substandard nutrition. They were not allowed certain types of possessions (bicycles, cameras). They often were denied holidays and had to work seven days a week. They could not enter a marriage without permission. Births were discouraged, and children were sometimes taken away from their families (see kidnapping of Polish children by Nazi Germany).

Punishments for disobedience for Polish workers included being sent to a concentration camp and the death penalty. Germans who disobeyed those laws by helping or sympathizing with the workers were to be punished as well, in extreme cases, by being sent to concentration camps.

Maintain the purity of German blood! That applies to both men and women! Just as it is considered the greatest disgrace to become involved with a Jew, any German engaging in intimate relations with a Polish male or female is guilty of sinful behavior. Despise the bestial urges of this race! Be racially conscious and protect your children. Otherwise you will forfeit your greatest asset: your honor!

== Application ==
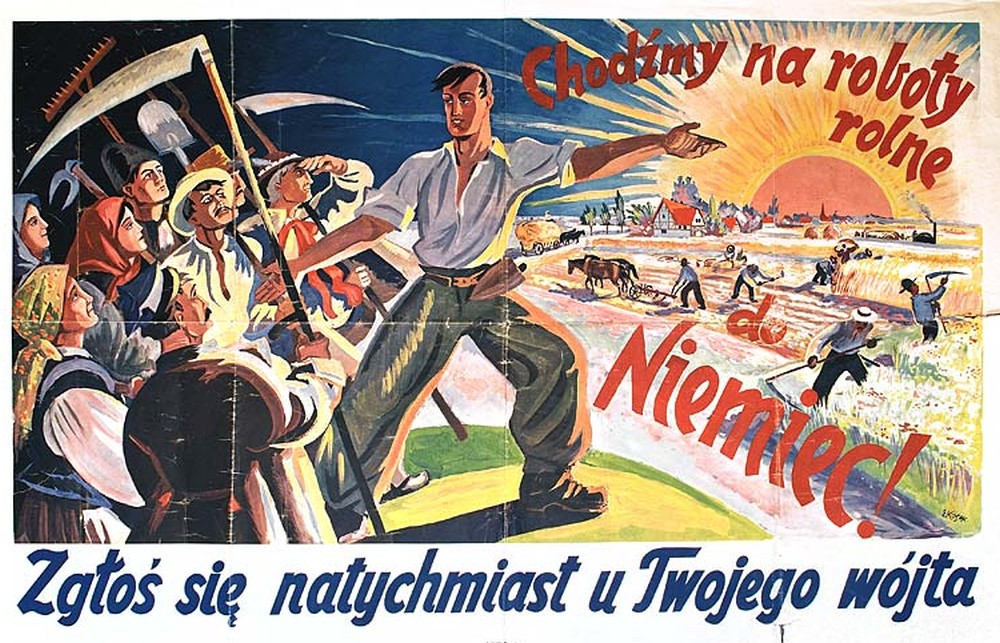
German propaganda poster in Polish: "Let's do agricultural work in Germany. Report immediately to your Wojt"

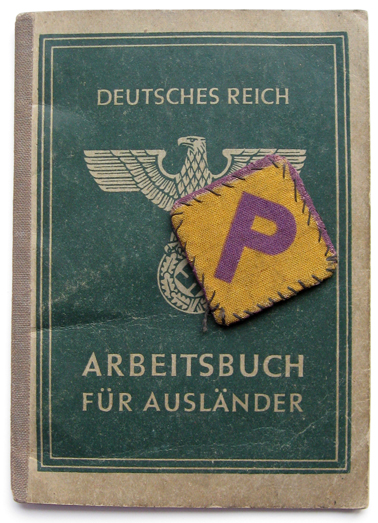
Arbeitsbuch Für Ausländer (Workbook for Foreigner) identity document issued to a Polish Forced Labourer in 1942 by the Germans together with a letter "P" patch that Poles were required to wear to distinguish them from the German population.

After the invasion of Poland, Poles over the age of 14 living in the General Government were subject to compulsory labor. In 1939 there were about 300,000 prisoners from Poland working in Germany; Already in 1944 there were about 2,8 m Polish Zivilarbeiters in Germany (approximately 10% of Generalgouvernement workforce) and a similar number of workers in this category from other countries. Forced laborers worked in agriculture, but also manufacturing.

Where voluntary recruitment failed to yield a required number of workers, penalties were issued on communities that failed to provide workers (confiscation of property, fines); later, manhunts were organized (see łapanka).

Workers' lives were almost totally regimented.

In December 1941 the decrees were supplemented by Polish Criminal Regulation (Polenstrafrechtsverordnung), which introduced shortened trials for Poles in criminal cases. In February 1942 Eastern decrees (Ostarbeitererlasse) were issued concerning the OST-Arbeiter (workers from territories taken from Soviet Union); based on the Polish decrees.

== See also ==
- Reich Security Main Office
