= Forced labour under German rule during World War II =

Use of forced labour by Nazi Germany
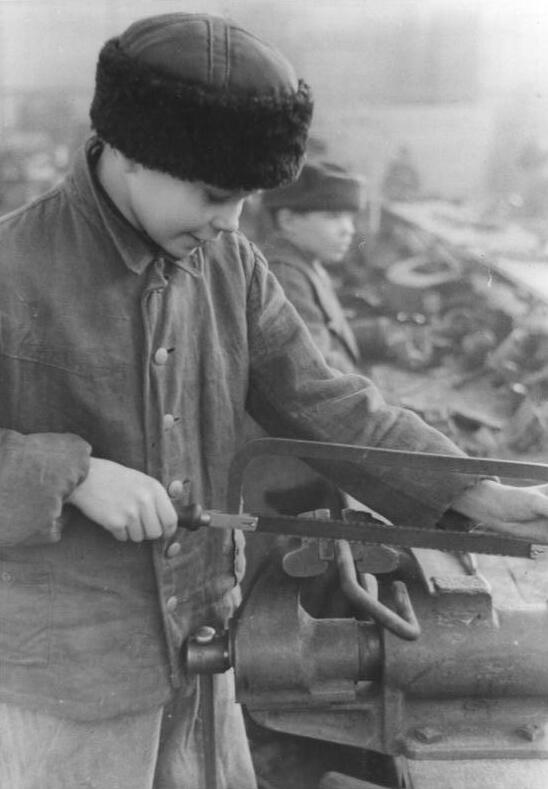
Original Nazi propaganda caption: "A 14-year-old youth from Ukraine repairs damaged motor vehicles in a Berlin workshop of the German Wehrmacht. January 1945."

The use of slave and forced labour in Nazi Germany (German: Zwangsarbeit) and throughout German-occupied Europe during World War II took place on an unprecedented scale. It was a vital part of the German economic exploitation of conquered territories. It also contributed to the mass extermination of populations in occupied Europe. The Germans abducted approximately 12 million people from almost twenty European countries; about two thirds came from Central Europe and Eastern Europe.

Many workers died as a result of their living conditions – extreme mistreatment, severe malnutrition and abuse were the main causes of death. Many more became civilian casualties from enemy (Allied) bombing and shelling of their workplaces throughout the war. At the peak of the program, the forced labourers constituted 20% of the German work force. Counting deaths and turnover, about 15 million men and women were forced labourers at one point during the war. Besides Jews, the harshest deportation and forced labor policies were applied to the populations of Belarus, Ukraine, and Russia. By the end of the war, half of Belarus's population had been either killed or deported.

The defeat of Nazi Germany in 1945 freed approximately 11 million foreigners (categorized as "displaced persons"), most of whom were forced labourers and POWs. During the war, German forces had brought into the Reich 6.5 million civilians, in addition to Soviet POWs, for unfree labour in factories. Returning them home was a high priority for the Allies. The United Nations Relief and Rehabilitation Administration (UNRRA), Red Cross, and military operations provided food, clothing, shelter, and assistance in returning home. In all, 5.2 million foreign workers and POWs were repatriated to the Soviet Union, 1.6 million to Poland, 1.5 million to France, and 900,000 to Italy, along with 300,000 to 400,000 each to Yugoslavia, Czechoslovakia, the Netherlands, Hungary, and Belgium.

== Forced workers ==
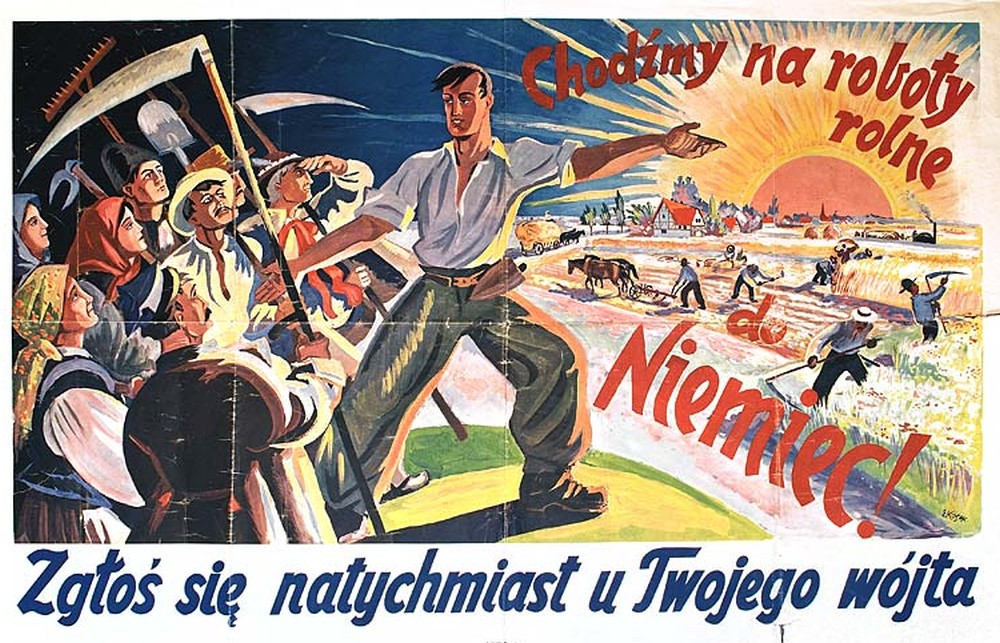
German Polish-language recruitment poster: "'Let's do farm work in Germany!' See your wójt at once."

Hitler's policy of Lebensraum ('room for living') strongly emphasized conquest of lands in the East, known as Generalplan Ost, and the exploitation of these lands to provide cheap goods and labour for Germany. Even before the war, Nazi Germany maintained a supply of slave labour. This practice started in the early days of labour camps for "unreliable elements" (German: unzuverlässige Elemente), such as homosexuals, criminals, political dissidents, communists, Jews, the homeless and anyone the regime wanted out of the way. During World War II the Nazis operated several categories of Arbeitslager (labour camps) for different categories of inmates. Prisoners in Nazi labour camps were worked to death on short rations in lethal conditions, or killed if they became unable to work. Many died as a direct result of forced labour under the Nazis.

After the invasion of Poland, Polish Jews over the age of 12 and Poles over the age of 12 living in the General Government territory were subject to forced labor. Historian Jan Gross estimates that "no more than 15 percent" of Polish workers volunteered to go to work in Germany. In 1942, all non-Germans living in the General Government were subject to forced labor.

Compulsory-labour notice issued by the Labour Office in German-occupied Bobruisk, 18 December 1943, ordering the recipient to report for work on 21 December.

The largest number of labour camps held civilians forcibly abducted in the occupied countries (see Łapanka) to provide labour in the German war industry, repair bombed railroads and bridges, or work on farms. Manual labour was in high demand, as much of the work that today would be done with machines was still done by hand in the 1930s and 1940s, such as digging, material handling, or machining. As the war progressed, the use of slave labour increased massively. Prisoners of war and civilian "undesirables" were brought in from occupied territories. Millions of Jews, Slavs and other conquered peoples were used as slave labourers by German corporations including Thyssen, Krupp, IG Farben, Bosch, Daimler-Benz, Demag, Henschel, Junkers, Messerschmitt, Siemens, and Volkswagen, not to mention the German subsidiaries of foreign firms, such as Fordwerke (a subsidiary of Ford Motor Company) and Adam Opel AG (a subsidiary of General Motors) among others. Once the war had begun, the foreign subsidiaries were seized and nationalized by the Nazi-controlled German state, and work conditions deteriorated, as they did throughout German industry. About 12 million forced labourers, most of whom were Eastern Europeans, were employed in the German war economy inside Nazi Germany during the war. The German need for slave labour grew to the point that even children were kidnapped as labour, in an operation called the Heu-Aktion.

More than 2,000 German companies profited from slave labour during the Nazi era, including Deutsche Bank and Siemens.

=== Classifications ===
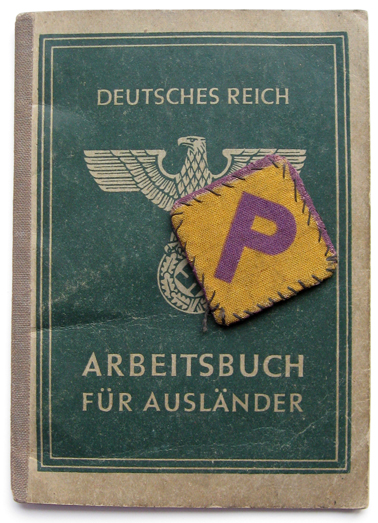
Arbeitsbuch Für Ausländer ('Workbook for Foreigner') identity document issued to a Polish forced labourer in 1942 by the Germans, together with a letter "P" patch that Poles were required to wear to distinguish them from the German population

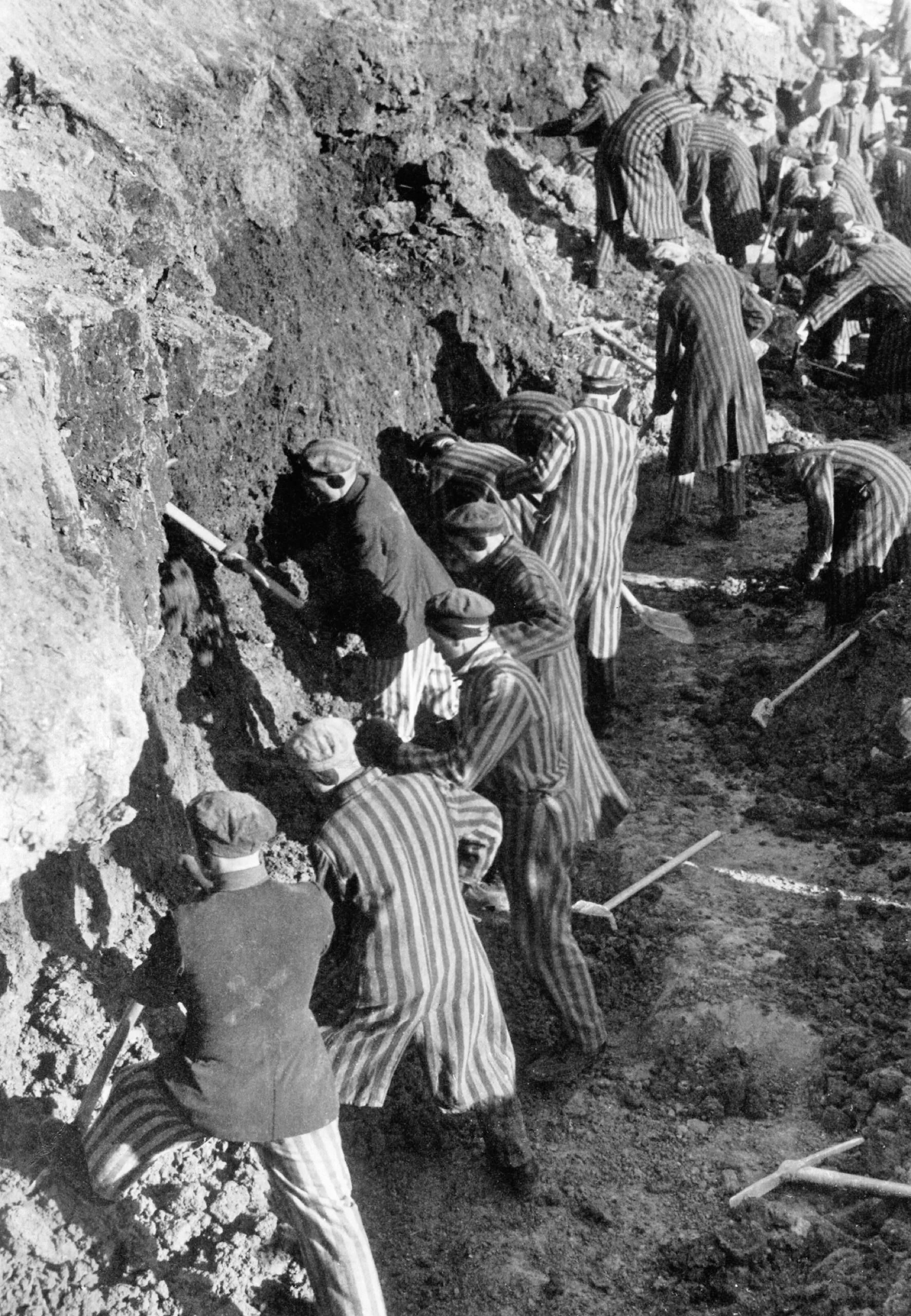
Forced labor at Sachsenhausen concentration camp

A class system was created amongst Fremdarbeiter ('foreign workers') brought to Germany to work for the Reich. The system was based on layers of increasingly less privileged workers, starting with well-paid workers from German allies or neutral countries to forced labourers from conquered Untermenschen ('sub-humans') populations.

- Gastarbeitnehmer ('guest workers') – Workers from Germanic and Scandinavian countries, France, Italy, other German allies (Romania, Bulgaria, Hungary), and friendly neutrals (e.g. Spain and Switzerland). Only about 1% of foreign workers in Germany came from countries that were neutral or allied to Germany.
- Zwangsarbeiter (forced workers) – Forced labourers from countries not allied with Germany. This class of workers was broken down into the following designations:
  - Militärinternierte ('military internees') – Prisoners of war. Geneva Conventions allowed captor nations to force non-officer prisoners of war to work, within certain restrictions. For example, almost all Polish non-officer prisoners of war (c. 300,000) were forced to work in Nazi Germany. In 1944, almost 2 million prisoners of war worked as forced labourers in Germany. Compared to other foreign workers, prisoners of war were relatively well-off, especially if they came from Western countries that were still at war, such as the United States or Great Britain, as the minimum standards of their treatment were mandated by the Geneva Conventions. Their working conditions and well-being were subject to supervision by the International Red Cross and, in cases of mistreatment, retaliation against German prisoners held in the US, Britain and Canada (who performed similar forced labor) was almost certain. However, the treatment of these workers varied greatly depending on their country of origin, the period, and the specific workplace. In particular, Soviet prisoners of war were treated with utter brutality, as Nazis did not consider them protected under the Geneva Conventions, which had not been ratified or implemented by the Soviet Union.
  - Zivilarbeiter ('civilian workers') – ethnic Poles from the General Government territory. They were regulated by strict Polish decrees: they received much lower wages and could not use conveniences such as public transport, or visit many public spaces or businesses. For example, they could not visit German church services, swimming pools, or restaurants; they had to work longer hours and were assigned smaller food rations, and they were subject to a curfew. Poles were routinely denied holidays and had to work seven days a week. They could not marry without a permit; they could not possess money or objects of value, even bicycles, cameras, or lighters. They were required to wear a badge: the "Polish P", on their clothing. In 1939, there were about 300,000 Polish Zivilarbeiter in Germany. By 1944, their number had skyrocketed to about 1.7 million, or 2.8 million by different accounts (approximately 10% of occupied Poland's prisoner workforce). In 1944, there were about 7.6 million foreign so-called 'civilian workers' employed in Germany in total, including POWs from Generalgouvernement and the expanded USSR, with a similar number of workers in this category from other countries.
  - Ostarbeiter ('Eastern workers') – Soviet and Polish civil workers, mostly rounded up in Distrikt Galizien and in Reichskommissariat Ukraine. They wore an "OST" (East) badge and had to live under guard in camps fenced with barbed wire, and were particularly vulnerable to the whims of the Gestapo and the industrial plant guards. Estimates put the number of OST workers at between 2.8 and 3 million.

In general, foreign labourers from Western Europe had similar gross earnings and were subject to similar taxation as German workers. In contrast, Central and Eastern European forced labourers received at most about one-half the gross earnings paid to German workers and had far fewer social benefits. Prisoners of labour or concentration camps received little if any wages or benefits. The deficiency in net earnings of Central and Eastern European forced labourers (versus forced labourers from Western countries) is illustrated by the wage savings forced labourers were able to transfer to their families at home or abroad (see table).

=== Sexual slavery ===
The Nazis issued a ban on sexual relations between Germans and foreign workers. Repeated efforts were made to propagate Volkstum ('racial consciousness'), to prevent such relations. Pamphlets, for instance, instructed all German women to avoid physical contact with any foreign workers brought to Germany as a danger to their blood. Women who disobeyed were imprisoned although executions also took place. Even fraternization with the workers was regarded as dangerous, and targeted by pamphlet campaigns in 1940–1942. Soldiers in the Wehrmacht and SS officers were exempt from any such restrictions. It is estimated that at least 34,140 Eastern European women apprehended in Łapankas (military kidnapping raids) were forced to serve them as sex slaves in German military brothels and camp brothels during the Third Reich. In Warsaw alone, five such establishments were set up under military guard in September 1942, with over 20 rooms each. Alcohol was not allowed, unlike on the Western front, and the victims underwent genital checkups once a week.

=== French shipyards ===
French workers at naval bases provided the Kriegsmarine with an essential workforce, thereby supporting Nazi Germany in the Battle of the Atlantic. By 1939, the Kriegsmarine's planning had presumed that they had time to build up resources before the war started. When France fell and the ports of Brest, Lorient and Saint-Nazaire became available, there were insufficient Germans to man these repair and maintenance facilities, so huge reliance was made on the French workforce. At the end of 1940, the Kriegsmarine requested 2,700 skilled workers from Wilhelmshaven to work in bases on the Atlantic coast, but this was out of a total available workforce of only 3,300. This same request included 870 men skilled in machinery and engine building, but there were only 725 people with these skills in Wilhelmshaven. This massive deficit was made up of French naval dockyard workers. In February 1941, the naval dockyard at Brest had only 470 German workers, compared with 6,349 French workers. In April 1941, French workers replaced defective superheater tubes on the Scharnhorst, carrying out the work slowly but, in the opinion of Scharnhorst's captain, to a better standard than could be obtained in the yards in Germany. An assessment commissioned by Vizeadmiral Walter Matthiae in October 1942 of the potential effect of withdrawal of French dockyard workers (considered possible after 32 French fatalities in an air raid at Lorient Submarine Base) stated that all repairs on the surface fleet would cease and U-boat repairs would be cut by 30 per cent. Admiral François Darlan stated on 30 September 1940 that it was useless to decline German requests for collaboration. In September 1942, Rear Admiral Germain Paul Jardel, commander of the French navy in the occupied zone, stated "We have a special interest in that the workers at our arsenals work, and that they work in the arsenals and not in Germany." From a practical point of view, French workers needed employment and could have been conscripted to work in Germany (as happened to 1 million of them). A small number objected to carrying out war work but the majority were found by the Germans to be willing and efficient workers.

=== Numbers ===
In the late summer of 1944, German records listed 7.6 million foreign civilian workers and prisoners of war in the German territory, most of whom had been brought there by coercion, to make up for the conscription of 11 million Germans. By 1944, slave labour made up one quarter of Germany's entire work force, and the majority of German factories had a contingent of prisoners. The Nazis also had plans for the internment and transportation to Europe of "the able-bodied male population between the ages of seventeen and forty-five" in the event of a successful invasion of the United Kingdom.

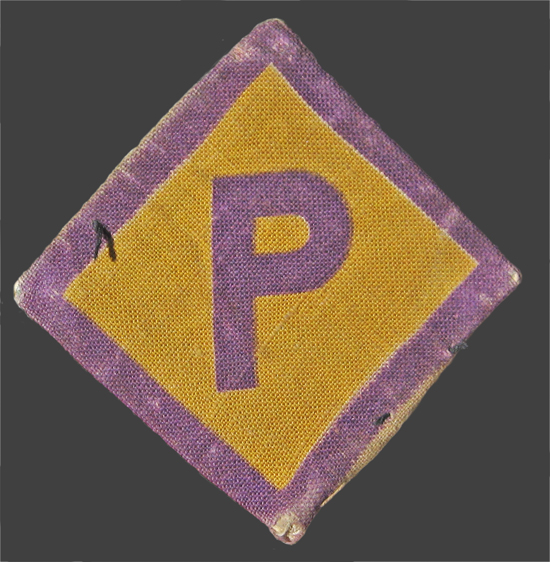
Polish forced workers' Zivilarbeiter badge

OST-Arbeiter badge

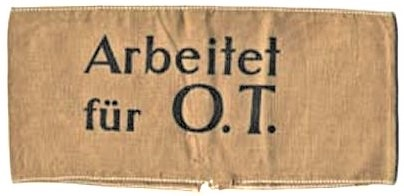
Todt-Arbeiter badge

Foreign civilian forced labourers in Nazi Germany by country of origin, January 1944 with transfer payment to the Reich per labourer
Countries	Number	% of total	RM
Total	6,450,000	100.0%	
Occupied Central and Eastern Europe	4,208,000	65.2%	median 15 RM
Czechoslovakia	348,000	5.4%	
Poland	1,400,000	21.7%	33.5 RM
Yugoslavia	270,000	4.2%	
USSR including annexed lands	2,165,000	33.6%	4 RM
Hungary	25,000	0.4%	
Greece	20,000	0.3%	
Occupied Western Europe	2,155,000	33.4	median 700 RM
France (except Alsace-Lorraine)	1,100,000	17.1%	487 RM
Norway	2,000	–	
Denmark	23,000	0.4%	
Netherlands	350,000	5.4%	
Belgium	500,000	7.8%	913 RM
Italy (Note: By September 1943 Italy had switched sides, and in Northern Italy the Italian Social Republic puppet state was born; therefore it is included in Occupied Western Europe. Bulgaria, Hungary and Romania would not switch sides until summer 1944 and are included in German allies section.)	180,000	2.8%	1,471 RM
German allies and neutral countries	87,000	1.3%	
Bulgaria	35,000	0.5%	
Romania	6,000	0.1%	
Spain	8,000	0.1%	
Switzerland	18,000	0.3%	

==== Industry type ====
Foreign workers comprised 3% of the war industry workforce in 1940 but had risen to 29% in 1944. In agriculture, it had risen from 6% in 1940 to 22% in 1944.

== Organisation Todt ==
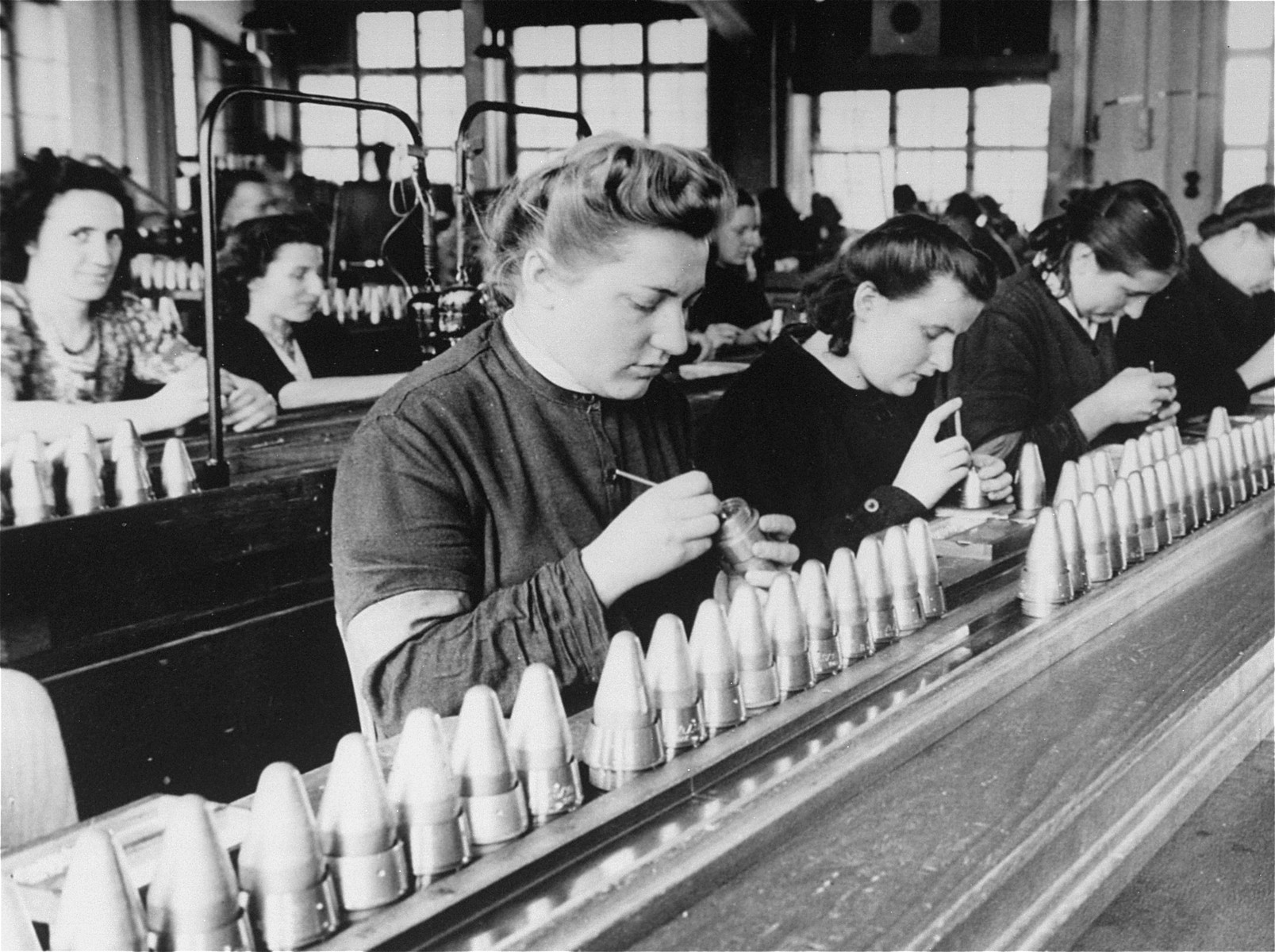
Foreign workers from Stadelheim Prison work in a factory owned by the AGFA camera company.

Organisation Todt was a Nazi era civil and military engineering group in Nazi Germany, eponymously named for its founder Fritz Todt, an engineer and senior Nazi figure. The organization was responsible for a huge range of engineering projects both in pre-World War II Germany, and in occupied Europe from France to Russia. Todt became notorious for using forced labour. Most so-called "volunteer" Soviet POW workers were assigned to the Organisation Todt. The history of the organization falls into three main phases:

1. A pre-war period between 1933 and 1938, during which the predecessor of Organisation Todt, the office of General Inspector of German Roadways (Generalinspektor für das deutsche Straßenwesen), was primarily responsible for the construction of the German Autobahn network. The organisation was able to draw on "conscripted" (i.e. compulsory) labour from within Germany through the Reich Labour Service (Reichsarbeitsdienst, RAD).
2. The period from 1938 to 1942, after Operation Barbarossa, when the Organisation Todt proper was founded and used on the Eastern front. The huge increase in the demand for labour created by the various military and paramilitary projects was met by a series of expansions of the laws on compulsory service, which ultimately obligated all Germans to arbitrarily determined (i.e. effectively unlimited) compulsory labour for the state: Zwangsarbeit. From 1938 to 1940, over 1.75 million Germans were conscripted into labour service. In 1940–42, Organization Todt began to rely on Gastarbeitnehmer (guest workers), Militärinternierte (military internees), Zivilarbeiter (civilian workers), Ostarbeiter (Eastern workers) and Hilfswillige ("volunteer") POW workers.
3. The period from 1942 until the end of the war, with approximately 1.4 million labourers in the service of the Organisation Todt. Overall, 1% were Germans rejected for military service and 1.5% were concentration camp prisoners the rest were prisoners of war and compulsory labourers from occupied countries. All were effectively treated as slaves and existed in the complete and arbitrary service of a ruthless totalitarian state. Many did not survive the work or the war.

== Extermination through labour ==
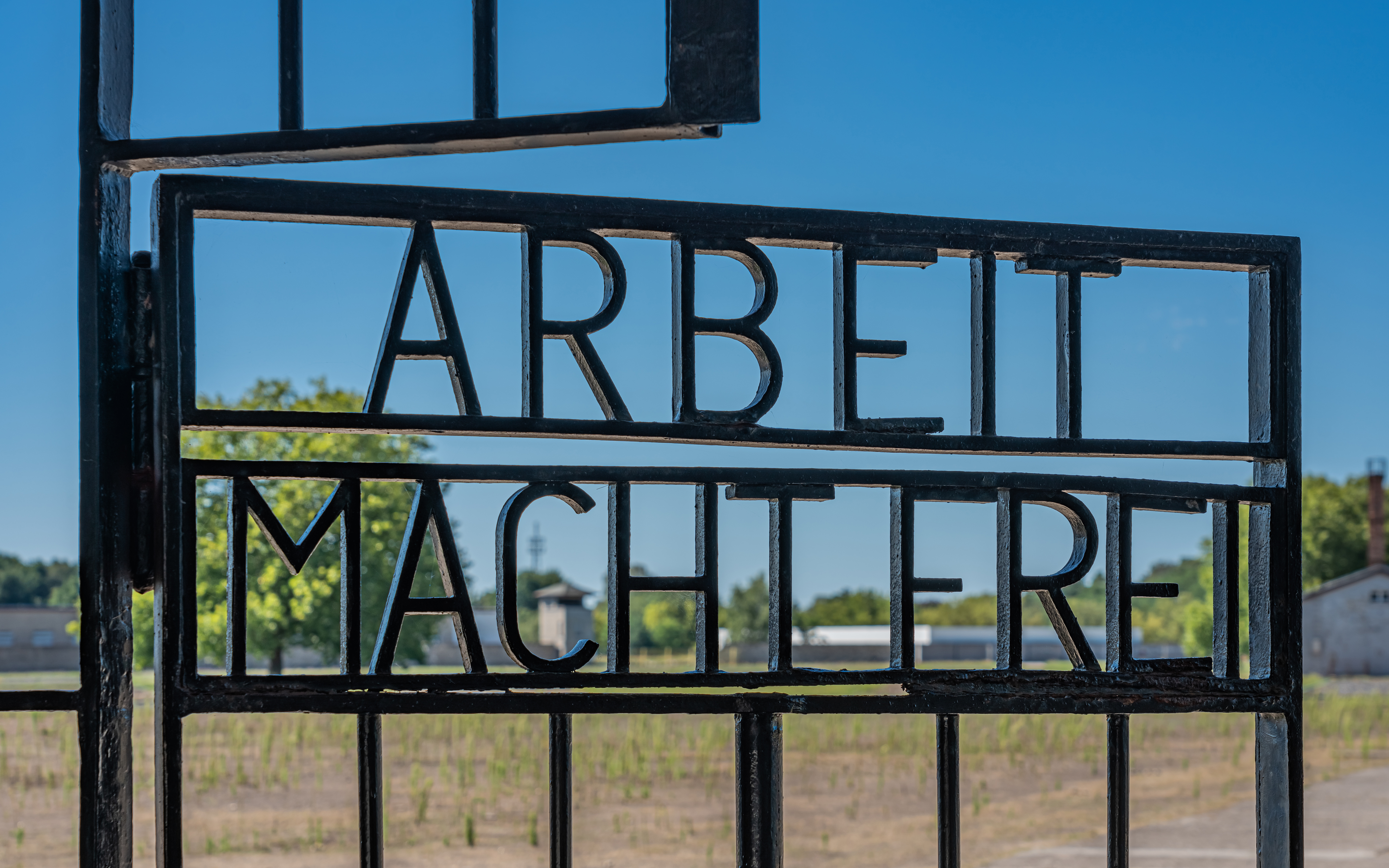
Arbeit Macht Frei ('work will set you free') gate at KZ Sachsenhausen

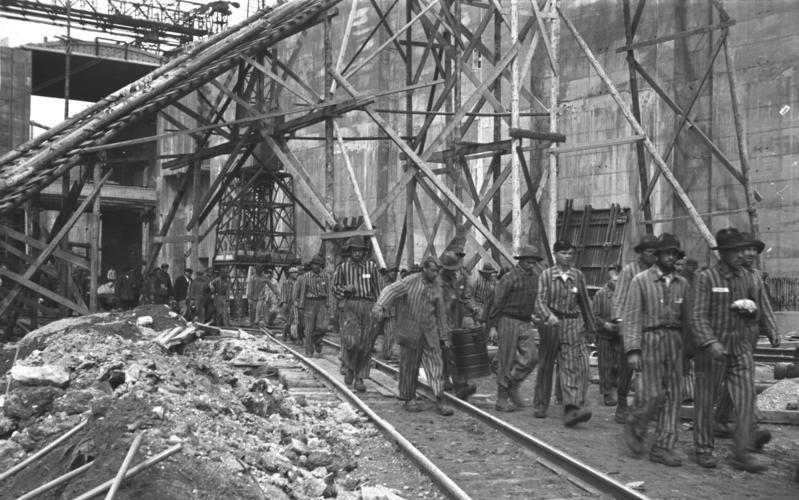
Forced concentration camp labour at U-boat pens in Bremen, 1944

Millions of Jews were forced labourers in ghettos, before they were shipped off to extermination camps. The Nazis also operated concentration camps, some of which provided free forced labour for industrial and other jobs while others existed solely to exterminate their inmates. To mislead the victims, at the entrances to a number of camps the lie 'work brings freedom' (arbeit macht frei) was placed, to encourage the false impression that cooperation would earn release. A notable example of a labour-concentration camp is Mittelbau-Dora, a labour camp complex that produced V-2 rockets. Extermination through labour was a Nazi German principle that regulated most of their labour and concentration camps. The rule demanded that inmates of German World War II camps be forced to work for the German war industry with only basic tools and minimal food rations until totally exhausted.

== Controversy over compensation ==
To benefit the economy after the war, certain categories of victims of Nazism were excluded from compensation by the German government; these groups had the least political influence they could have brought to bear, and many forced labourers from Eastern Europe fall into this category. There has been little effort by businesses or the German government to compensate forced labourers from the war period.

As stated in the London Debt Agreement of 1953:

Consideration of claims arising out of the Second World War by countries which were at war with or were occupied by Germany during that war, and by nationals of such countries, against the Reich and agencies of the Reich, including costs of German occupation, credits acquired during occupation on clearing accounts and claims against the Reichskreditkassen shall be deferred until the final settlement of the problem of reparations.

To this day, there are arguments that such settlement has never been fully carried out. German post-war development has been greatly aided, while the development of victim countries has stalled.

A prominent example of a group which received almost no compensation is the Polish forced labourers. According to the Potsdam Agreements of 1945, the Poles were to receive reparations not from Germany itself, but from the Soviet Union's share of those reparations; under Soviet pressure on the Polish Communist government, the Poles agreed to a system of repayment that de facto meant that few Polish victims received adequate compensation in any way comparable to the victims in Western Europe or Soviet Union itself. Most of the Polish share of reparations was "given" to Poland by Soviet Union under the Comecon framework, which was not only highly inefficient, but benefited Soviet Union much more than Poland. Under further Soviet pressure (related to the London Agreement on German External Debts), in 1953 the People's Republic of Poland renounced its right to further claims of reparations from the successor states of Nazi Germany. Only after the fall of communism in Poland in 1989/1990 did the Polish government try to renegotiate the issue of reparations, but found little support in this from the German side and none from the Soviet (later, Russian) side.

The total number of forced labourers under Nazi rule who were still alive as of August 1999 was 2.3 million. The German Forced Labour Compensation Programme was established in 2000; a forced labour fund paid out more than €4.37 billion to close to 1.7 million of then-living victims around the world (one-off payments of between €2,500 and €7,500). German Chancellor Angela Merkel stated in 2007 that "Many former forced labourers have finally received the promised humanitarian aid"; she also conceded that before the fund was established nothing had gone directly to the forced labourers. German president Horst Koehler stated:

It was an initiative that was urgently needed along the journey to peace and reconciliation... At least, with these symbolic payments, the suffering of the victims has been publicly acknowledged after decades of being forgotten.

== See also ==
- Compulsory labor of the Jews in Romania
- Private sector participation in Nazi crimes
- Arbeitseinsatz, (forced labour deployment)
  - Totaleinsatz, a colloquial term used for a subset of the Arbeitseinsatz program concerning 400,000 Czechs
- Polnischer Baudienst im Generalgouvernement, (Polish Construction Service in the General Government)
- Deutsche Wirtschaftsbetriebe (DWB), (German Economic Enterprises)
- Fritz Sauckel
- Forced labor in the Soviet Union
- Italian military internees
- Ispettorato Militare del Lavoro
- Service du travail obligatoire (STO), (Compulsory Work Service in Vichy France)
- Forced labor of Germans after World War II
- 1943 Greek protests against labour mobilization
