= Arbeitseinsatz =

Nazi German forced labour internment in WWII

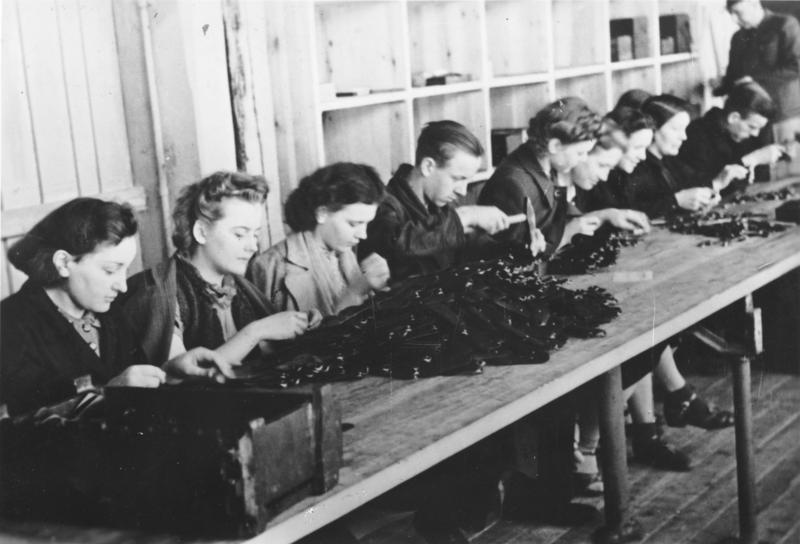
- Mainly female slave labour at a German rifle factory, occupied Poland. An estimated 2,500 German companies employed forced labour during World War II
- Location: German-occupied Europe, forced labour predominantly from Nazi occupied Poland and the Soviet Union
- Period: World War II (1939–1945)

Arbeitseinsatz (German: for 'labour deployment') was a forced labour category of internment within Nazi Germany (German: Zwangsarbeit) during World War II. When German men were called up for military service, Nazi German authorities rounded up civilians to fill in the vacancies and to expand manufacturing operations. Some labourers came from Germany but exponentially more from roundups in the German-occupied territories. Arbeitseinsatz was not restricted to the industry sector and to arms producing factories; it also took place, for example, in the farming sector, community services, and even in the churches.

== Labour categories ==
Mortality rates among labour deployment workers
Labour category	Annual mortality rate
German workers	0,4%
Danish workers	0,4%
Italian workers (1938–42)	0.3%
Dutch workers	1%
Belgian prisoners-of-war	0.6%
British prisoners-of-war	0.8%
French prisoners-of-war	0.8%
Italian prisoners-of-war (1943–45)	4%
Soviet prisoners-of-war	≈100%
Concentration camp prisoners	≈100%

There were many affected populations who could be grouped by various (often overlapping) variables such as geographic, ethnic, religious, political, and health categories. They included German political prisoners of the SA, Gestapo, and SS; foreign civilian men and women from occupied territories of Eastern Europe (Ostarbeiter); prisoners of war; institutionalized people (mentally or physically disabled people, or medical and psychiatric patients); and various ethnic, religious, or ethnoreligious groupings (for example, Jews, Sinti, Romani, Yeniche, and Jehovah's Witnesses). They lived in various kinds of camps, called labor camps (Arbeitslager in German) and concentration camps (Konzentrationslager [KZ] in German). Nazi concentration camps were often meant not only for forced labor but also extermination. In 1945 about 7.7 million workers in the German industry were of non-German origin. Many of them were very young, and about half of them were women.

== Archival photographs ==
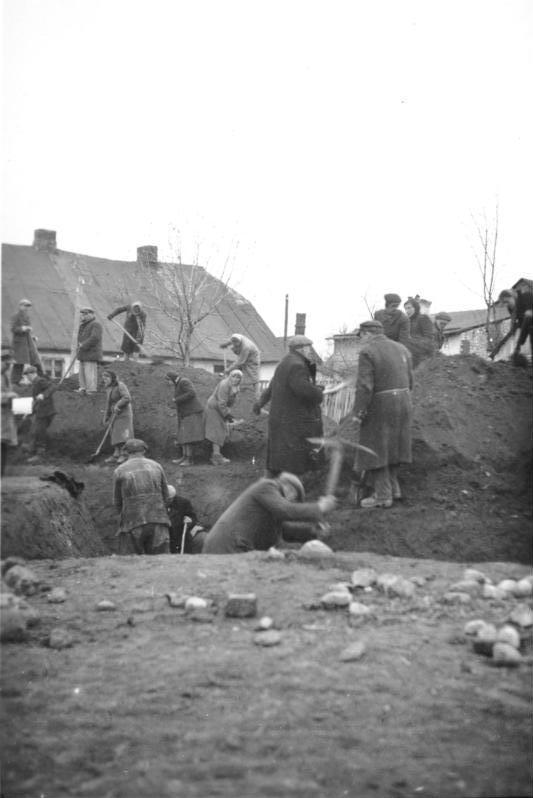
Jews build air-raid trenches under the supervision of RAD, Uniejów, May 1941

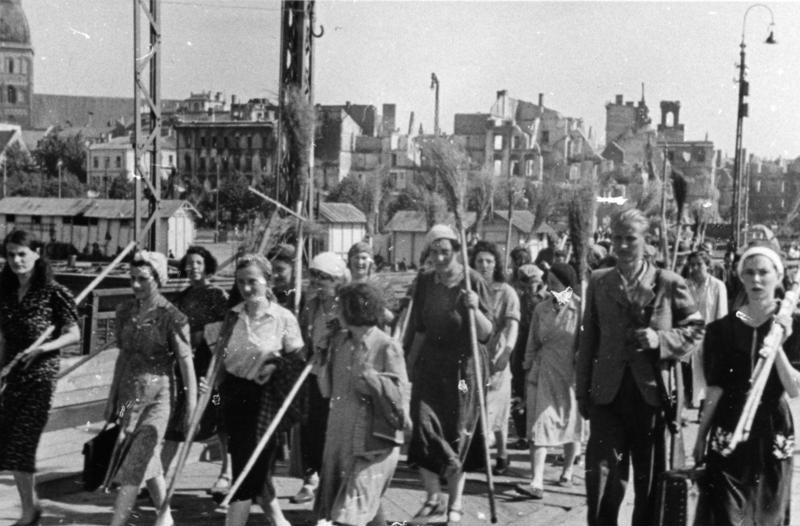
Paramilitary police with workers, Riga, 11 July 1941 (Wehrmacht photo)

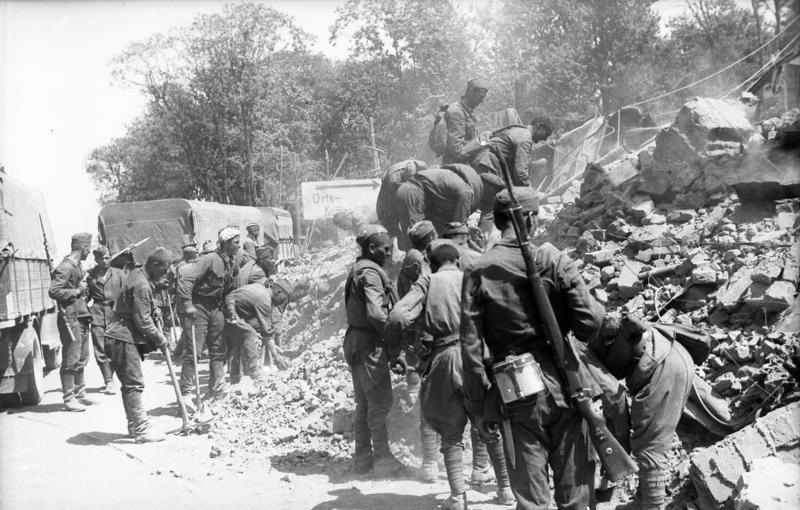
Soviet POWs clear the way for Wehrmacht column, Minsk, July 1941 (Wehrmacht photo)

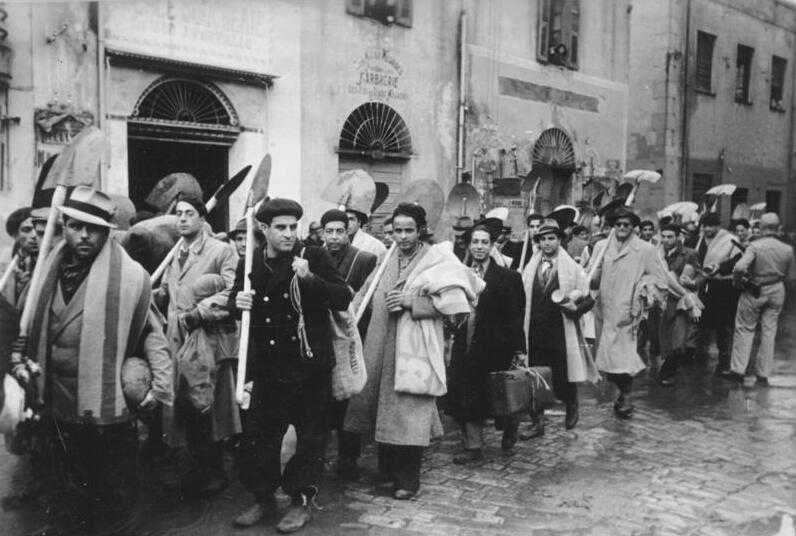
"Jews must work", Tunis, December 1942, (Wehrmacht photo)

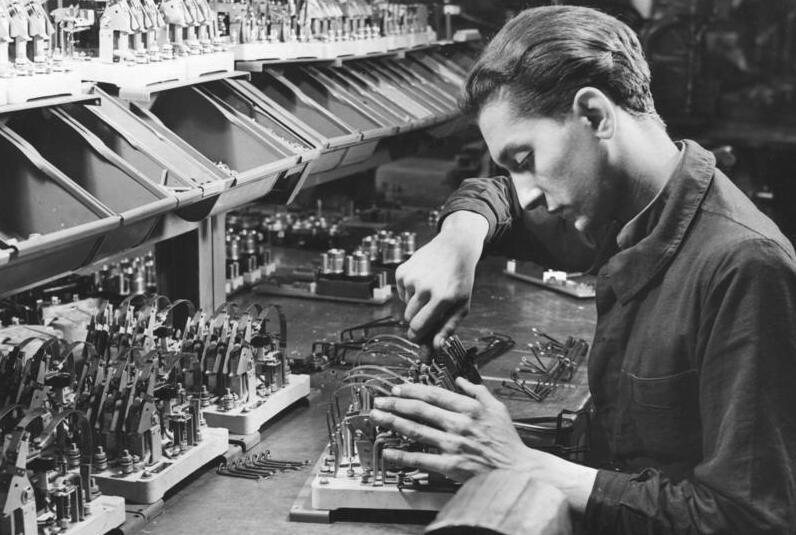
French mechanics at Siemens in Berlin, 1943

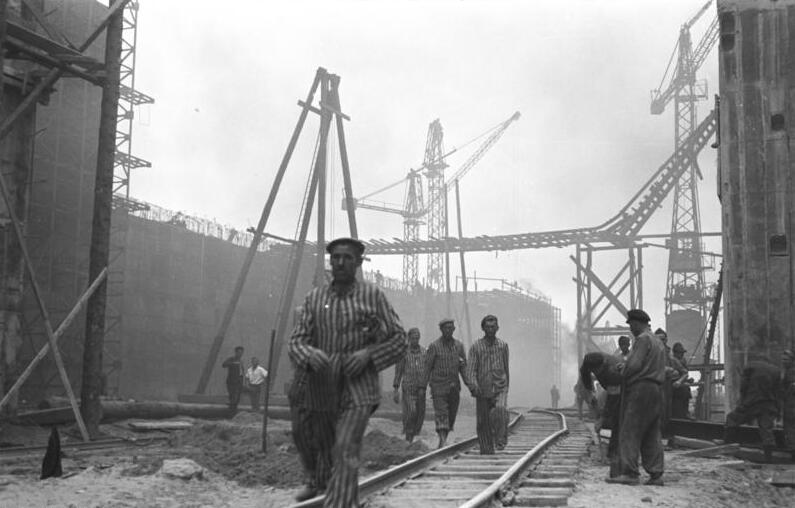
Prisoners in the construction of the U-boat at Valentin submarine pens, Bremen, 1944

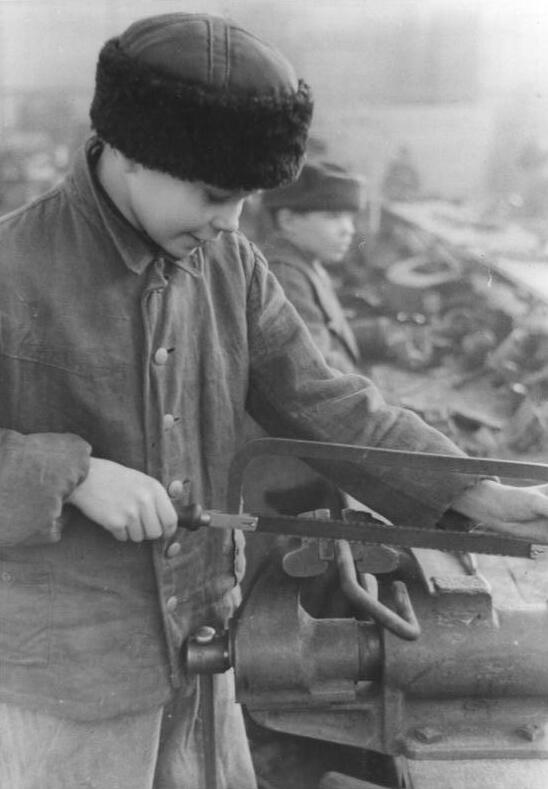
14-year-old prisoner at the Wehrmacht Automotive Repair Works, Berlin, January 1945

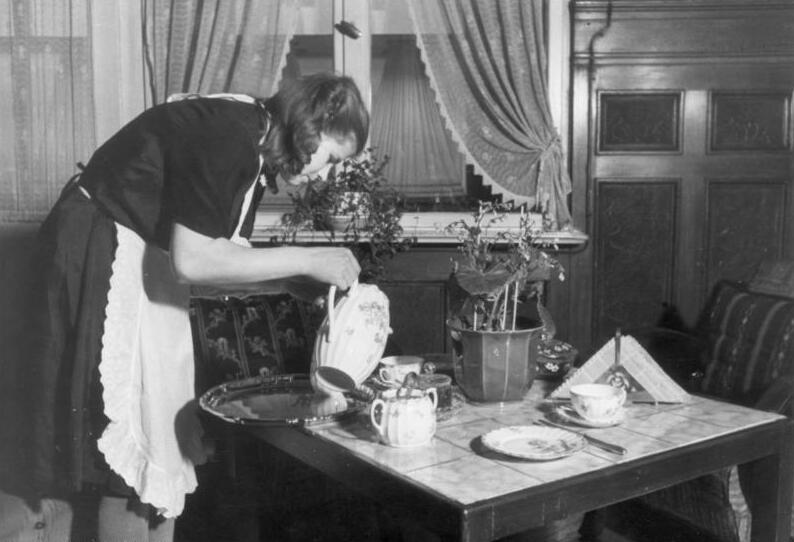
Ostarbeiterin from Kiev performing domestic labor, January 1945 (SS image)

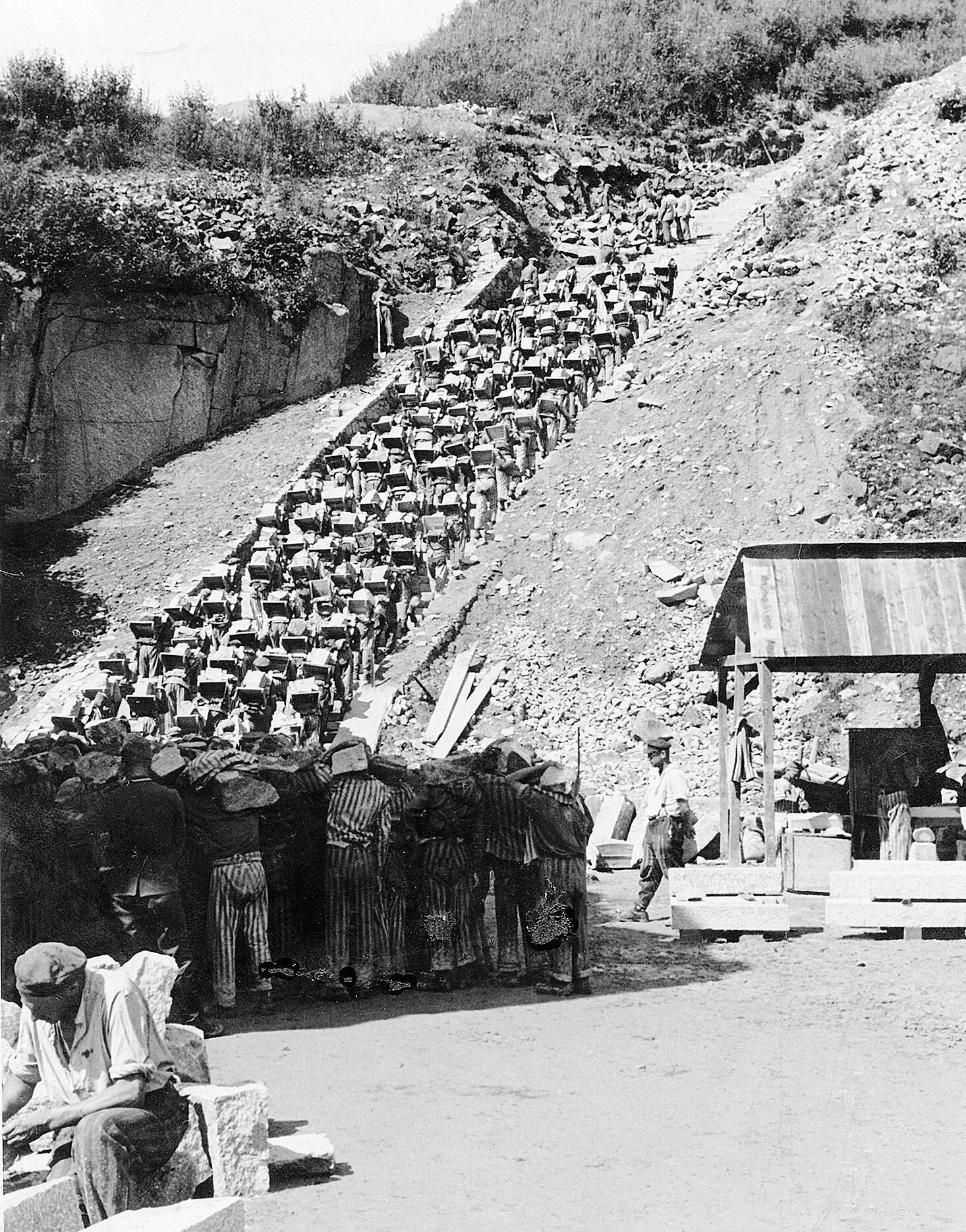
Stairs of Death in the quarry of the Mauthausen concentration camp
