= Ostarbeiter =

Nazi Germany term for Eastern foreign worker

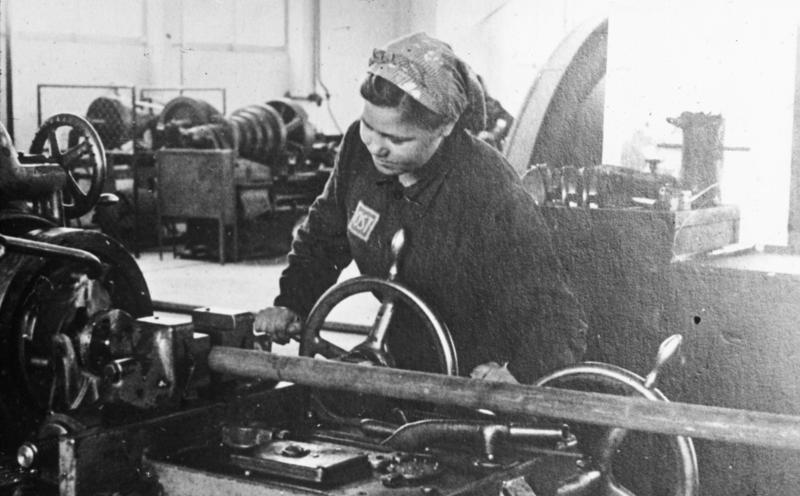
- Woman with an Ostarbeiter badge at the Auschwitz subsidiary IG-Farbenwerke factory (Nazi propaganda image)

- Ostarbeiter badge

Operation
- Period: 1941–1945
- Location: German-occupied Europe

Prisoners
- Total: 2.8 million
- Deaths: 80,000 to 100,000

Ostarbeiter (German: [ˈɔstˌʔaʁbaɪtɐ], lit. "Eastern worker") was a Nazi German designation for millions of foreign workers deported from the occupied Soviet Union for slave labor in Germany during World War II. The program was a war crime and a crime against humanity.

Ostarbeiter comprised about 2.8 million people, with the largest group (2.2 million) coming from Ukraine. About 1.6 million were children under 16. They often received starvation rations and were forced to live in guarded labor camps. 80,000 to 100,000 died from starvation, disease, overwork, bombing (they were frequently denied access to bomb shelters), abuse, and execution by the German overseers. These workers were often denied wages; when they did get paid, they received payment in a special currency which could only be used to buy specific products at the camps where they lived.

Following the war, the Allies repatriated many of the over 2.5 million liberated Ostarbeiter under the terms of the Yalta Agreement. Those from territories annexed by the Soviet Union in 1939-1941 were not subject to repatriation from the Western zones of occupation, and settled in Germany or emigrated. In 2000 the German government and thousands of German companies made a one-time payment of just over € 5 billion to Ostarbeiter victims of the Nazi regime.

== Terminology ==
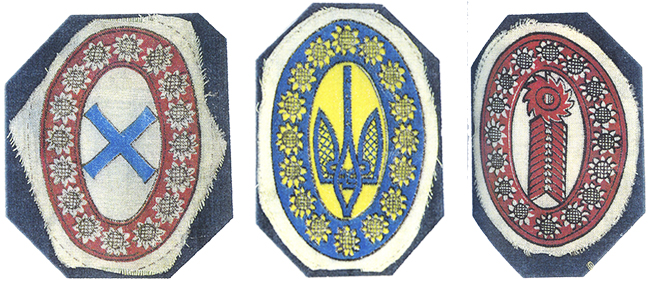
"Nationality badges" (Volkstumabzeichen) of Ostarbeiter from Russia, Ukraine and Belarus colored in accordance with their national flags: blue Saint Andrew's cross on white within a red oval (white-blue-red flag of Russia), yellow within blue badge with the Ukrainian trident and white and red badge in accordance to the white-red-white flag of Belarus. The badges were legally introduced on 19 June 1944 as replacements for the "OST" badges and practically implemented seemingly only after February 1945.

The official German records for the late summer of 1944 listed 7.6 million foreign civilian workers and prisoners of war in the territory of the "Greater German Reich", who for the most part had been brought there by force. Thus, they represent roughly a quarter of all registered workers in the entire economy of the German Reich at that time.

A class system was created amongst the Fremdarbeiter (foreign workers) brought to Germany. The multi-layered system was based on layers of national hierarchies. The Gastarbeitnehmer, the so-called "guest workers" from Germanic countries, Scandinavia, Romania and Italy, had the highest status. The forced workers in Germany included Militärinternierte (military internees), POWs, and Zivilarbeiter ("civilian workers"), primarily Polish workers from the General Government. They received reduced wages and food rations and had to work longer hours than the former, could not use public facilities (such as public transportation, restaurants, or churches), were forbidden to possess certain items and some were required to wear a sign – the "Polish P" – attached to their clothing.

The Ostarbeiter were the "eastern workers", primarily from Reichskommissariat Ukraine. They were marked with a badge reading "OST" (East) and were subject to even harsher conditions than the civilian workers. They were forced to live in special camps that were fenced with barbed wire and under guard, and were particularly exposed to the arbitrariness of the Gestapo and the commercial industrial plant guards. By the end of 1944 the German Reich held 5.7 million of foreign civilian workers; 2.8 million of them were from the Soviet Union.

== Demographics ==
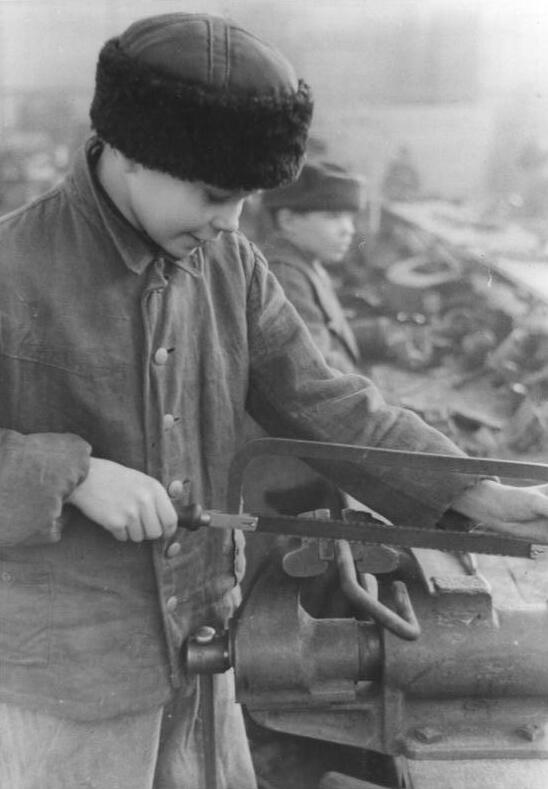
Nazi propaganda caption: "A 14-year-old youth from Ukraine repairs damaged motor vehicles in a Berlin workshop of the German Wehrmacht. January 1945."

Ostarbeiter victims comprised about 2.8 million people, with 2.2 million coming from Ukraine. Following Operation Barbarossa, the Germans deported civilians at unprecedented levels from the newly-formed German districts of Reichskommissariat Ukraine, District of Galicia (itself attached to the General Government), and Reichskommissariat Ostland. These areas comprised the conquered territories of the Soviet Union within its 1941 borders. In addition to Ukrainians, Ostarbeiter included ethnic Belarusians, Russians, Poles, Armenians, Tatars, and others.

Although forced workers from most occupied territories were predominantly men, of the "eastern workers" taken from occupied Soviet territories over 50% were women. A significant number of them were children, deported alone or with their families. After the war, Soviet authorities repatriated about 1.65 million children under the age of 16. By 1944, most new workers were under 16; 30% were as young as 12–14 years of age when taken from their homes. The age limit was reduced to 10 in November 1943.

By 1944, the policy turned into mass abductions of virtually anyone to fulfill the labour needs of the Organisation Todt among other similar projects; 40,000 to 50,000 children aged 10 to 14 were kidnapped by the German occupational forces and transported to Germany proper as slave labourers during the so-called Heuaktion. The Heuaktion (lit. transl. hay operation) was an acronym for allegedly homeless, parentless and unhoused children gathered in lieu of their guardians. After arriving in Germany, the children were handed over to Reich Labour Service or the Junkers aircraft works. The secondary purpose of these abductions was to pressure the adult populations further to register in place of children.

== History ==
At the end of 1941, a labour crisis developed in Germany. Following the mobilization of men into its massive armies, the country faced a shortage of labour in support of its war industries. To help overcome this shortage, Göring decreed to bring in people from the territories seized during Operation Barbarossa in the Soviet Union.

=== Recruitment and kidnapping ===
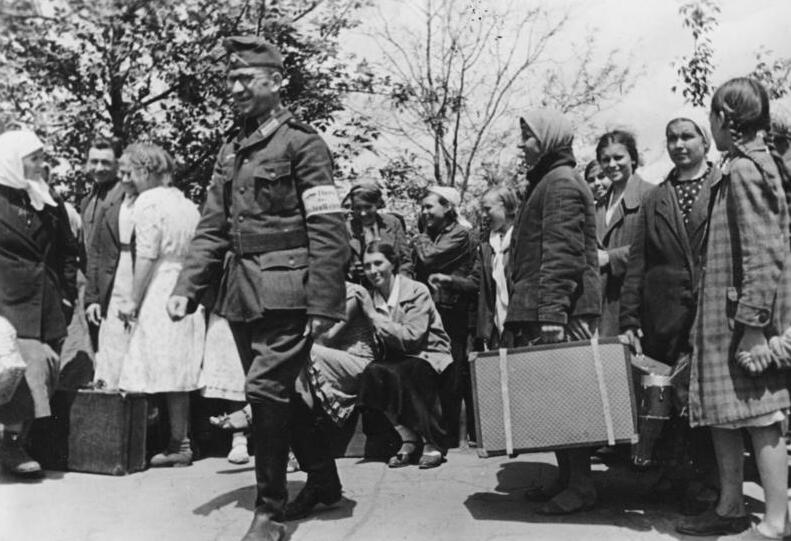
Forced laborers before departure, Ukraine, May 1942

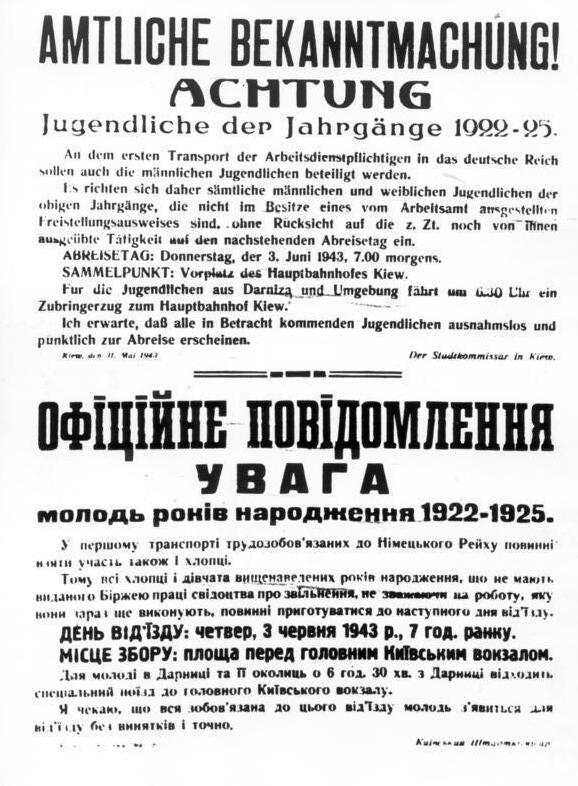
An announcement in German and Ukrainian targeting those of 1922-1925 birth years for mandatory labor service in Germany; May 1943

Russian-language Nazi poster reading "I live with a German family and feel just fine. Come to Germany to help with household chores."

Initially a recruiting campaign was launched in January 1942 by Fritz Sauckel for workers to go to Germany. "On January 28 the first special train will leave for Germany with hot meals in Kiev, Zdolbuniv and Przemyśl", offered an announcement. The first train was full when it departed from Kiev on January 22.

The advertising continued in the following months. "Germany calls you! Go to Beautiful Germany! 100,000 Ukrainians are already working in free Germany. What about you?" ran a Kiev newspaper ad on March 3, 1942. Word got back however, of the sub-human slave conditions that Ukrainians met in Germany and the campaign failed to attract sufficient volunteers. Forced recruitment was implemented, although propaganda still depicted the workers as volunteers.

When the news about the terrible conditions many Ostarbeiter faced in Germany came back to Ukraine, the pool of volunteers dried up. The Germans resorted to mass round-ups, often targeting large gatherings such as church congregations and crowds at sporting events, with entire groups simply marched off at gunpoint to waiting cattle trucks and deported to Germany.

=== Employment ===
Ostarbeiter were employed in agriculture, mining, armament manufacturing, metal production, and railroads. Ostarbeiter were initially sent to intermediate camps, where laborers were picked out for their assignments directly by representatives of labor-starved companies. Ford-Werke in Cologne and Opel in Rüsselsheim and Brandenburg each employed thousands of such Ostarbeiter at their plants.

Some Ostarbeiter worked for private firms, although many were employed in the factories making armaments. These factories were prime targets for Allied bombing. The Ostarbeiter were considered to be quite productive and efficient. Males were thought to be the equivalent of 60-80% of a German worker, and women — 90-100%. Two million Ukrainians worked mostly in the armaments factories, including the V-2 rocket factory at Peenemünde.

According to Alexander Dallin, as of December 1944, the numbers of deployment were:

Task	Number of Ostarbeiter
Agricultural work	725,000
Mining	93,000
Machine and equipment manufacturing	180,000
Metal industries	170,000
Railways	122,000

One special category was that of young women recruited to act as nannies; Hitler argued that many women would like to have children, and many of them were restricted by the lack of domestic help (this was one of many efforts made to promote the birth rate). Since the nannies would be in close company with German children as well as in a position where they might be sexually exploited, they were required to be suitable for Germanization. Himmler spoke of thus winning back German blood and benefiting the women, too, who would have a social rise through working in Germany and even the chance to marry there. They could be assigned only to families with many children who would properly train the nannies as well. These assignments were carried out by the NS-Frauenschaft. Originally, this recruitment was carried out only in the annexed territories of Poland, but the lack of women who passed screening extended it to all of Poland, and also to occupied territories of the USSR.

=== Conditions ===
Within Germany Ostarbeiter lived either in private camps owned and managed by the large companies, or in special camps guarded by privately paid police services known as the Werkschutz. They worked an average of 12 hours a day, six days a week. They were paid approximately 30% of German workers' wages; however, most of the money went toward food, clothing and board. The labor authorities, the RSHA Arbeitskreis, complained that many firms viewed these former Soviet civilian workers as "civilian prisoners", treated them accordingly, and paid no wages at all to them. Those who received pay got specially printed paper money and savings stamps, which they could use only for the purchase of a limited number of items in special camp stores. By law they were given worse food rations than other forced labor groups. Starvation rations and primitive accommodation were given to these unfortunates in Germany.

The Ostarbeiter were restricted to their compounds, in some cases labor camps. Being ethnically Slavic, they were classified by German authorities as the Untermenschen ("sub-humans"), who could be beaten, terrorized, and killed for their transgressions. Those who tried to escape were hanged where other workers could see their bodies. Escape or leaving without authorization was punished by death. The Nazis issued a ban on sexual relations between Germans and the Easterners. On 7 December 1942 Himmler called for any "unauthorized sexual intercourse" to be punishable by death. In accordance with these new racial laws all sexual relations, even those that did not result in pregnancy, were severely punished as Rassenschande (racial pollution). During the war, hundreds of Polish and Russian men were executed for their sexual relations with German women, even though the main offenders by far – wrote Ulrich Herbert – were the French and Italian civilian workers who were not prohibited from social contacts with them.

Rape of female Ostarbeiter was extremely common and led to tens of thousands of pregnancies from rape. The victims began giving so many unwanted births that hundreds of special Nazi birthing centres for foreign workers had to be created in order to dispose of their infants.

Nazi authorities attempted to reproduce such conditions on farms, ordering farmers to integrate the workers into their workforce while enforcing total social separation, including not permitting them to eat at the same table, but this proved far more difficult to enforce. Sexual relationships in particular were able to take place despite efforts to raise German women's "racial consciousness". When Germany's military situation worsened, these workers' conditions often improved as the farmers tried to protect themselves against a defeat.

Representatives of collaborationist organizations courted the Ostarbeiter community for recruitment into armed collaborationist formations. Propagandists of the Vlasov Movement attempted to recruit them into the Russian Liberation Army, with no success on at least one occasion. According to recollections of one of the workers, they were met with shouts of "Shame!" from the women present. The Main Administration of Cossack Forces, a department of the Reich Ministry for the Occupied Eastern Territories, also sent emissaries. They were more successful; the department reported recruiting 7,000 troops from the Ostarbeiter camps for the 1st Cossack Cavalry Division in 1943.

Native German workers served as foremen and supervisors over the forced labour in factories, and therefore no solidarity developed between foreigners and German nationals. The German workers became accustomed to inequalities raised by racism against the workers and became indifferent to their plight.

=== Pregnancy ===
To prevent Rassenschande (violation of German racial laws by the native Germans), the farmers were given propaganda leaflets about miscegenation, which were completely ineffective. A staggering 80% of rapes occurred on farms where Polish girls worked. The newborns were secretly euthanized in Nazi birthing centres. At Arbeitslagers the infants were killed on site. The Western factory workers had brothels. Easterners did not. They were supposed to be recruited in equal numbers of men and women, so brothels would not be needed. Female labourers were always housed in separate barracks. Nevertheless, they were suspected by the SS of "cheating their way out of work" by conceiving. The earlier policy of sending them home to give birth, was replaced by the Reichsführer-SS in 1943 with a special abortion decree. Contrary to the Nazi law against German abortions, the Ostarbeiter women were usually forced to abort.

Occasionally, when the female worker and the baby's father were "of good blood" (for example, Norwegian), the child might prove "racially valuable." In such cases, the parentage was investigated and both parents tested. If they passed, the woman would be permitted to give birth, and the child was removed for Germanization. If the woman was found particularly suitable, she might be placed at a Lebensborn institution. However, when the born children did not pass, they were put in the Ausländerkinder-Pflegestätte facilities, where up to 90% of them would die a torturous death due to calculated abandonment.

In some rural areas, the authorities found that German farm-wives were inclined to care for children born to their workers, along with their own children. Attempts were made to segregate these children and use ruthless propaganda to establish that if a worker of "alien blood" gave birth in Germany, it meant immediate and total separation from the child. Repeated efforts were made to propagate Volkstum (racial consciousness) in order to prevent Rassenschande between Germans and foreign workers, nevertheless, the arrival of trains with Polish girls in German towns and villages usually turned into sex slave markets.

=== Death and disability ===
Historian Pavel Polian estimates that that from .8% to 1.2% of Ostarbeiter died every month, with the death toll being higher in 1942 and in 1944-1945. Earlier on the war the starvation rations and epidemics contributed to the high death toll, while later in the war air raids were a significant factor (although the rations improved). Total deaths were thus around 80,000 to 100,000 people. Tuberculosis was the leading cause of death accounting from 25% to 75% of cases. Hundreds of seriously ill Ostarbeiter were murdered in the so-called euthanasia programs. In addition, about 150,000 became disabled due to inhumane conditions or industrial accidents, and were thus shipped back to the occupied Soviet Union in 1942 and 1943.

On September 6, 1944 the Minister of the Interior ordered the establishment of special units for Ostarbeiter in several psychiatric hospitals in the Reich. The reason given was: "With the considerable number of Ostarbeiter who have been brought to the German Reich as a labour force, their admission into German psychiatric hospitals as mentally ill patients has become more frequent ... With the shortage of space in German hospitals, it is irresponsible to treat these ill people, who in the foreseeable future will not be fit for work, for a prolonged period in German institutions. "The exact number of Ostarbeiter killed in these psychiatric institutions is as yet not known. 189 Ostarbeiter were admitted to the Ostarbeiter unit of the Heil- und Pflegeanstalt Kaufbeuren; 49 died as a result of the starvation diet, or from deadly injections.

== Repatriation ==
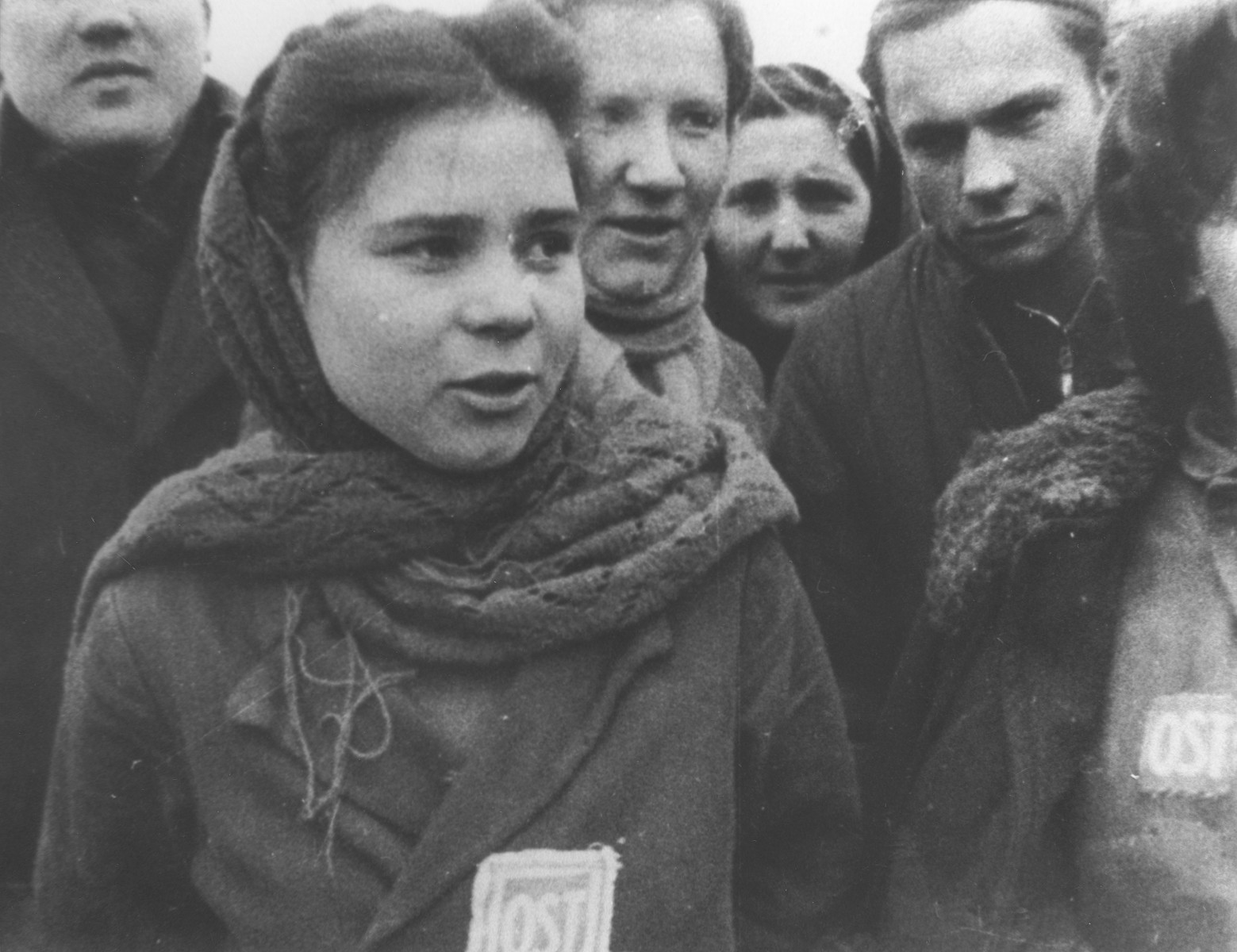
Female forced laborers wearing "OST" (Ostarbeiter) badges are liberated from a camp near Lodz.

After the war many of the Ostarbeiter were initially placed in DP (displaced person) camps from which they were returned to their country of origin, primarily the USSR. Many Ostarbeiter were still children or young teenagers when they were taken away and wanted to return home to their parents. Others who became aware of or understood the postwar political reality declined to return. The Soviet authorities used special Agit brigades to convince many Ostarbeiter to return.

Those in the Soviet occupational zones were returned automatically. Those in the French and British zones of occupation were forced to return under the terms of the Yalta Agreement. In October 1945, General Eisenhower banned the use of force in repatriation in the American Zone. As a result, many Ostarbeiter began to escape to the American Zone. Some, when faced with return to Soviet reality, chose to commit suicide.

Upon return to the Soviet Union Ostarbeiter were often treated as traitors. Many were transported to remote locations in the Soviet Union and were denied basic rights and the chance to get further education. Those who returned home were also physically and spiritually broken. Moreover, they were considered by the authorities to have "questionable loyalty", and were therefore discriminated against and deprived of many of their citizenship rights.

Ostarbeiter suffered from state-sanctioned stigmatisation, with special references in their passports (and the passports of their children and relatives) mentioning their time in Germany during the war. As a result, many jobs were off-limits to anyone unlucky enough to carry such a status, and during periods of repression former slave labourers would often be ostracised by the wider Soviet community. Many victims have testified that since the war they have suffered a lifetime of abuse and suspicion from their fellow countrymen, many of whom have accused them of being traitors who helped the Germans and lived comfortably in the Third Reich while Ukraine burned.

== Legal assessment ==
The execution of the Ostarbeiter program was formally designated as a war crime and a crime against humanity during the post-war Nuremberg trials. The International Military Tribunal found the program's chief architect, Fritz Sauckel, guilty of these charges for overseeing the forced deportation and camp internment of millions of Soviet civilians.

== Compensation ==
In 2000 the Foundation "Remembrance, Responsibility and Future", a project of the German Federal Government and 6,500 companies of the German Industry Foundation Initiative, was established, which disbursed 10 billion Deutsche Mark (5.1 billion €) to the former forced laborers. This is roughly one-off payment of €2,000 per worker, much less than the inflation-adjusted value of their work. Of the over 2 million Ostarbeiter in Ukraine, 467,000 received a total amount of €867 million, with each worker being assigned a one-time payment of 4,300 marks. The last payments were made in 2007.

== Research ==
Published eyewitness accounts of the Ukrainian Ostarbeiter experience are virtually non-existent in Ukraine although there were 2,244,000 of them from Ukraine, according to Ukrainian historian Yuriy Kondufor. The State Archival Service of Ukraine has a collection of documents online showing official notices published by the German government of occupation in Ukraine.

== See also ==
- Deutsche Wirtschaftsbetriebe, Nazi German Economic Enterprises, DWB
- Generalplan Ost and the Hunger Plan to use and abuse people in Central and Eastern Europe
- German atrocities committed against Soviet prisoners of war
- Kidnapping of children by Nazi Germany
- Exploitation of labor from the General Government:
  - Zivilarbeiter forced Polish laborers in the Third Reich
  - Polish decrees
  - Polenlager
