= Zivilarbeiter =

Forced-labor workers in Nazi Germany

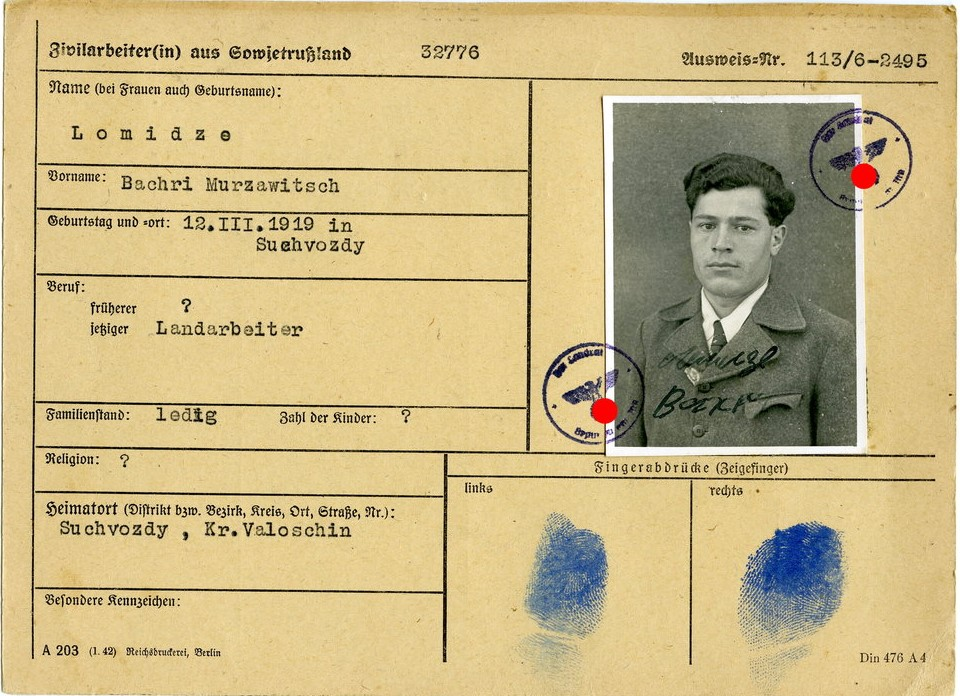
ID card of a Zivilarbeiter from Nazi-occupied Soviet Union

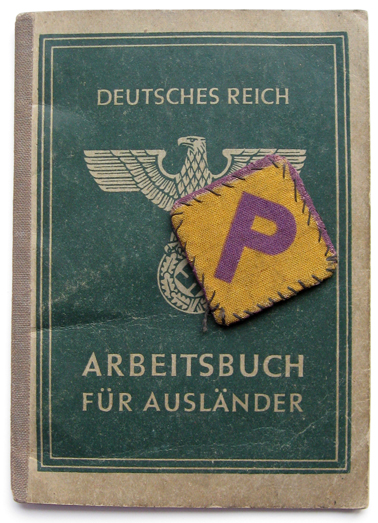
Arbeitsbuch für Ausländer (Workbook for Foreigner) identity document issued to a Polish Zivilarbeiter in 1942 together with a letter "P" patch Poles were required to wear attached to their clothing.

Zivilarbeiter (civilian worker) refers primarily to ethnic Polish residents from the General Government (Nazi-occupied central Poland), used during World War II as forced laborers in the Third Reich.

== Polish Zivilarbeiters ==
The residents of occupied Poland were conscripted on the basis of the so-called Polish decrees (Polenerlasse), and were subject to discriminatory regulation.

Compared to German workers or foreign workers from neutral and German-allied countries (Gastarbeitnehmer), Polish Zivilarbeiters received lower wages and were not allowed to use public conveniences (such as public transport) or visit many public spaces and businesses (for example they were not allowed to attend German church services, visit swimming pools or restaurants); they had to work longer hours than Germans; they received smaller food rations; they were subject to a curfew; they often were denied holidays and had to work seven days a week; could not enter a marriage without permission; possess money or objects of value. Bicycles, cameras and even lighters were forbidden. They were required to wear a sign – the "Polish-P" – attached to their clothing.

In late 1939 there were about 300,000 prisoners from Poland working in Germany; By autumn of 1944 their number swelled to about 2.8 million (approximately 10% of Generalgouvernement workforce). Poles from territories taken over after the German invasion of the Soviet Union and not included in the General Government (see Kresy) were treated as Ostarbeiters.

The history of Polish Zivilarbeiters dates back to October 1939, when German authorities issued a decree, which introduced mandatory work system for all residents aged 18 to 60. In December 1939, the system also covered those aged 14 to 18, with severe punishments for law breakers. The people who did not work were called by the local authorities, and sent to work in Germany. Since the Third Reich suffered from shortage of workers, as time went by also those Poles who had permanent employment, but were not regarded as necessary for the economy, were sent to Germany. Other methods were also used, such as the infamous roundups, called "łapanka" in Poland. Those who did not present a certificate of employment were automatically sent to Germany.

Most Polish Zivilarbeiters worked in agriculture, forestry, gardening, fishing, also in transport and industry. Some were employed as housekeepers. None signed any contracts, and their working hours were determined by the employers.

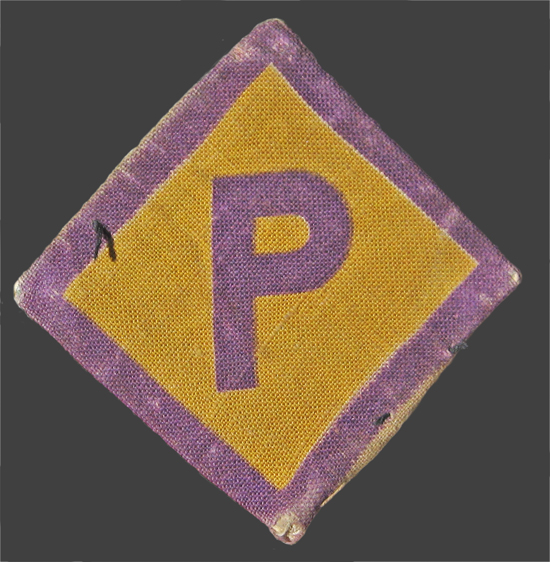
Polish-forced-workers' badge

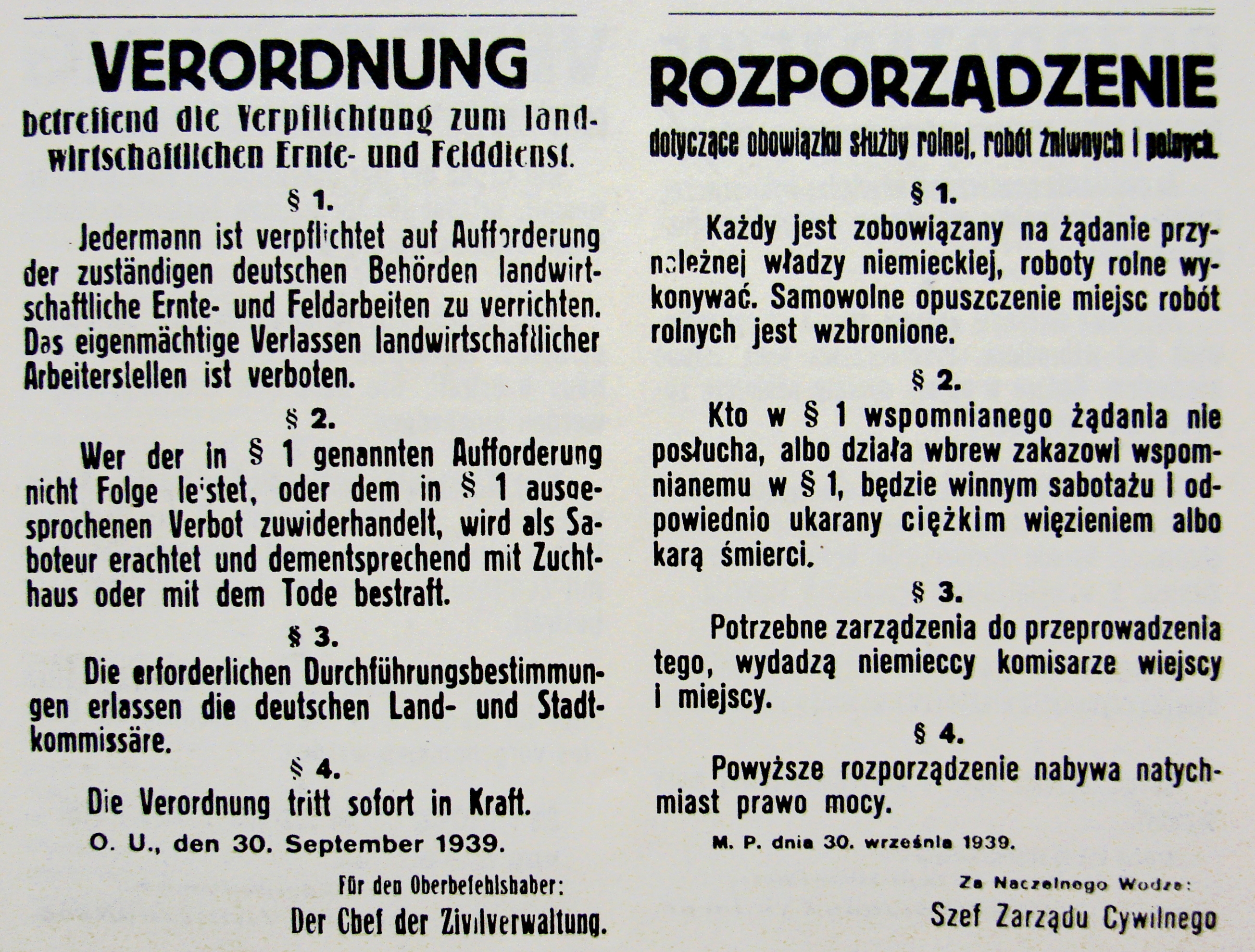
German notice from 30 September 1939 in occupied Poland with warning of death penalty for refusing work during harvest.

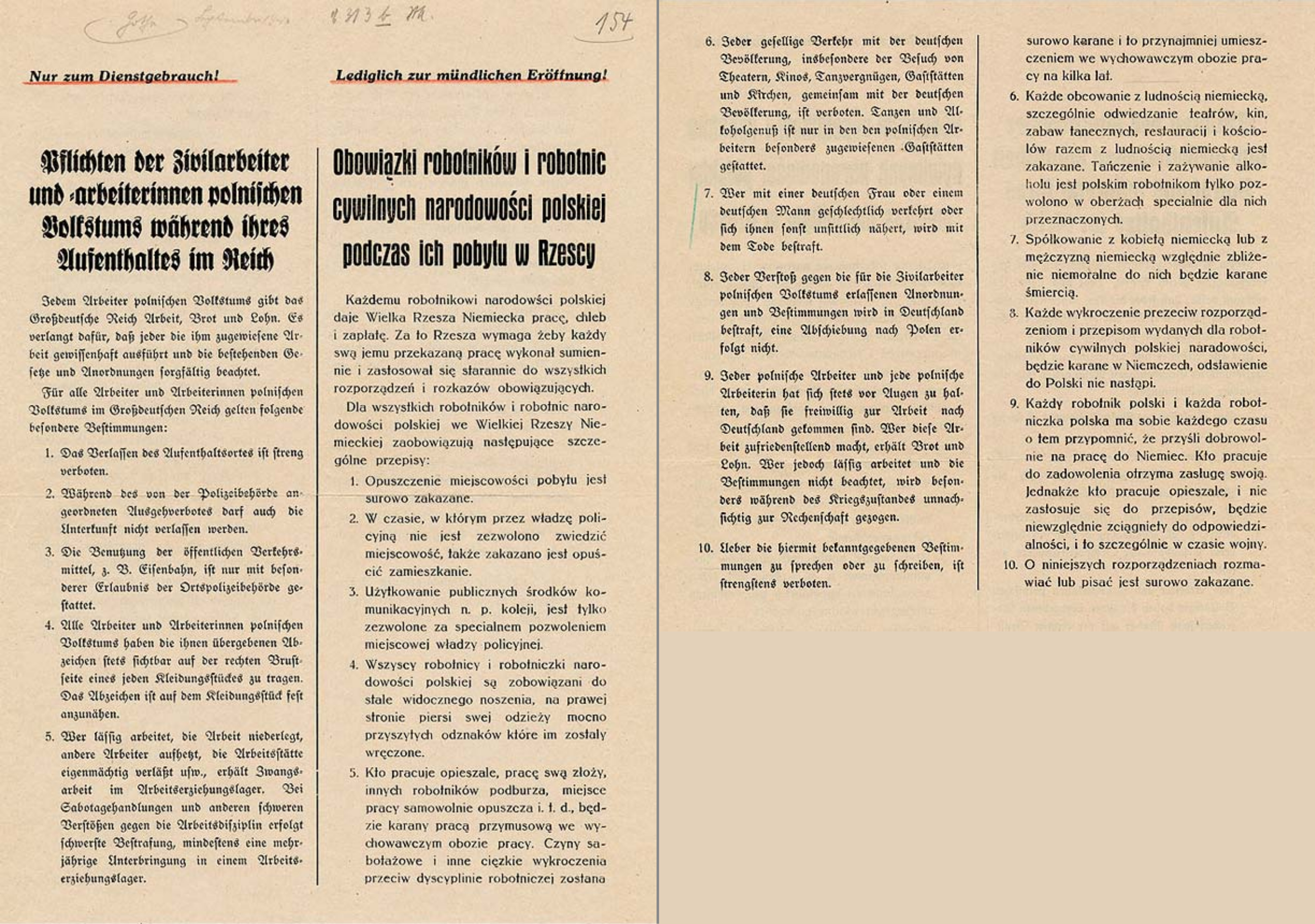
German and Polish poster describing "Obligations of Polish workers in Germany" including death sentence to every man and woman from Poland for sex with a German
