= Did the Children Cry? =

1994 book by Richard C. Lukas

Did the Children Cry? Hitler's War Against Jewish and Polish Children, 1939–45
- Cover of the book
- Author: Richard C. Lukas
- Language: English
- Subject: children in the Holocaust
- Publisher: Hippocrene Books
- Publication date: 1994
- Publication place: United States
- Pages: 263
- ISBN: 9780781802420
- OCLC: 878669401

Did the Children Cry? Hitler's War Against Jewish and Polish Children, 1939–45 is a 1994 book by Richard C. Lukas published by Hippocrene Books, focusing on the topic of Nazi Germany treatment of children during World War II, covering topics of Nazi crimes against children with focus on Polish and Jewish children.

The book received a second edition from the same publisher in 2016 (ISBN 9780781808705). In 2018 it received a Polish translation (translated by Tomasz Kaźmierczak and published by Replika Publishing House).

== Reception ==
Karl A. Schleunes, in his 1996 review of the book for The American Historical Review, said that it deals with an under-researched topic, and is a valuable contribution to studies of Germanization and the Holocaust. Schleunes writes that "Lukas makes it a point... to stress 'the commonality of suffering of Jewish and Polish children', an effort in which he largely succeeds."

Barbara Tepa Lupack, writing also in 1996 in The Polish Review, said that "Lukas in the current volume provides a gripping portrait of the Nazis' systematic genocide plan for all of Poland as well as an excellent analysis of the relationship between Poland's Jewish and gentile communities".

=== ADL prize controversy ===
The book received the Janusz Korczak Literary Award from the Anti-Defamation League (ADL). The biennial prize, awarded to books about children, was recommended by a panel of judges. The decision of the ADL’s own literary committee had been overruled by the political leadership of the organization under Abraham Foxman, which decided to withdraw the prize ten days before the award ceremony but reinstated it when Lukas threatened to sue them. The ADL cancelled the award ceremony and mailed the $1000 US prize money to Lukas. According to the ADL, the book was "problematic in several ways" and "strongly understated the level of anti-Semitism in Poland. It also strongly overstated the number of people who rescued Jews." The ADL's decision to withdraw the prize has been criticized by several individuals, including Danuta Mostwin, member of the panel and founder of the award; Joseph Kutrzeba, Holocaust survivor and film director; Theresa K. Bunk of the Polish American Congress; William A. Donohue, president of the Catholic League for Religious and Civil Rights; John Pawlikowski of the Catholic Theological Union, and historian Victor S. Mamatey. The event has been discussed in the context of anti-Polonism.

== See also ==
- Kidnapping of children by Nazi Germany
- Children in the Holocaust
