= Richard C. Lukas =

American historian (born 1937)

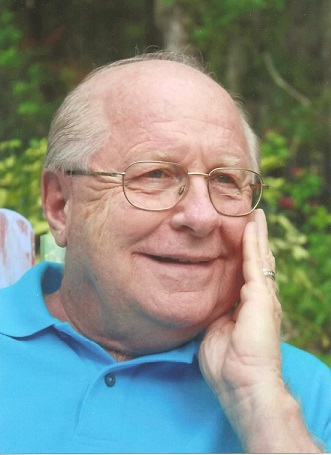
- Lukas in 2014
- Born: August 29, 1937 (age 89); Lynn, Massachusetts, U.S.
- Known for: The Forgotten Holocaust: The Poles Under German Occupation, 1939-1944

Academic background
- Education: Florida State University

Academic work
- Discipline: Polish history
- Institutions: Wright State University
- Website: www.richardclukas.com

Richard Conrad Lukas (born August 29, 1937) is an American historian and author of books and articles on military, diplomatic, Polish, and Polish-American history. He specializes in the history of Poland during World War II.

Before retiring from active teaching in 1995, he taught and did research at Tennessee Technological University, Wright State University, and the University of South Florida.

Lukas is best known for The Forgotten Holocaust: The Poles Under German Occupation, 1939–1944 (1986), a study of the wartime experience of the Polish people.

== Early life and education ==
Lukas was born on August 29, 1937, in Lynn, Massachusetts, to a Polish-American family of Pelagia Lukaszewski (née Kapuscinski) and her husband, Franciszek Lukaszewski. After receiving a BA in 1957, he worked as a research consultant, from 1957 to 1958, at the United States Air Force Historical Archives. He was awarded an MA in 1960 and a PhD from Florida State University in 1963, for a thesis entitled "Air Force Aspects of American Aid to the Soviet Union: The Crucial Years 1941–1942".

== Career ==
Lukas worked at Tennessee Technological University for 26 years from 1963, first as an assistant professor until 1966, then associate professor until 1969, and professor from then until 1989. He moved from Tennessee that year to Wright State University, teaching at its Lake campus until 1992. After this he worked as an adjunct professor of history at the Fort Myers campus of the University of South Florida until retiring in 1995.

== Publication history ==
As a graduate student, Lukas was a contributor to the project that resulted in the publication of Air Force Combat Units of World War II (1961).

=== Eagles East ===
Lukas's first book, Eagles East: The Army Air Forces and the Soviet Union, 1941-1945 (1970), a military-diplomatic study based on his doctoral dissertation, earned him the national history award of the American Institute of Aeronautics and Astronautics.

R. S. Hughes writing for the Military Affairs commended the book for its "extensive and detailed coverage of Allied-Soviet relations during World War II", and noted that it is particularly helpful for its discussion of the Lend-Lease program. Raymond L. Garthoff reviewing the book for the Slavic Review wrote that it is a "useful study" and "recommended reading" for those interested in the political-military history of USA-USSR relations during World War II with regard to interactions between the U.S. Army Air Forces and the USSR.

James J. Hudson in The American Historical Review called the book "an excellent example of military-diplomatic history". Sam Frank, in his review for The Journal of American History, wrote that the book "reflects extensive research and effective writing. An excellent balance has been achieved between factual presentation and interpretation."

=== The Strange Allies and Bitter Legacy ===
Lukas wrote two scholarly books on Allied wartime and American post-war relations with Poland. His book, The Strange Allies: Poland and the United States, 1941-1945 (1978) concerned the relationship between the United States and the Polish government-in-exile and highlighted the impact of American Polonia in United States-Polish relations. The sequel to The Strange Allies was Bitter Legacy: Polish-American Relations in the Wake of World War II (1982), which dealt with postwar Polish history and Polish-American relations, as well as the aid that was extended to Poland after World War II. George J. Lerski reviewing the book for The American Historical Review called it an "important and well-documented study" featuring "impeccable research in primary and secondary sources".

=== The Forgotten Holocaust ===
The Forgotten Holocaust: The Poles Under German Occupation, 1939-1944 (1986) is Lukas's most famous work and has been re-published in two subsequent editions (1997 and 2012, with a foreword by historian Norman Davies). It focuses on the sufferings of ethnic Poles in German- and Soviet-occupied Poland from 1939 to 1945.

Reviewers had differing views of the book. Donald E. Pienkos published a review in the Slavic Review (1986) that he later described as "generally praising the book"; it was followed by a critical review by David Engel in the same venue describing Lukas's book as a one-sided rebuke of "Jewish historians" and detailing "distortion, misrepresentation, and inaccuracy" in the book. An extensive correspondence followed among Lukas, Engel, and others in Slavic Review. Michael R. Marrus wrote in The Washington Post that "Lukas tells this story with an outrage properly contained within the framework of a scholarly narrative" but criticized what he felt was an unjustified "sustained polemic against Jewish historians". George Sanford noted in International Affairs that in tackling the subject of the suffering of ethnic Poles, Lukas's work is "strictly objective and academic in tone, presentation and content. But the underlying purpose is inevitably a polemical one, as he has to rake over the smouldering ashes of numerous sensitive controversies."

=== Out of the Inferno ===
Out of the Inferno: Poles Remember the Holocaust (1989) is a volume edited by Lukas dealing with memoirs of Poles concerning the Holocaust. John Klier noted in his review in The Slavonic and East European Review that the book is "a useful contribution" to the literature about The Holocaust in Poland. Jerzy Jan Lerski writing for The Polish Review called the book "timely", but noted it is the weakest of Lukas's books up to date, criticizing it as "uneven, poorly organized and [lacking] focus". The book was also reviewed in German by Dieter Pohl for Jahrbücher für Geschichte Osteuropas.

=== Did the Children Cry? ===
Lukas's next book, Did the Children Cry?: Hitler's War Against Jewish and Polish Children, 1939–45 (1994), deals with the topic of Nazi crimes against children. Karl A. Schleunes in his review of the book for The American Historical Review noted that it deals with an under-researched topic, and is a valuable contribution to studies of Germanization and the Holocaust. Schleunes writes that "Lukas makes it a point... to stress 'the commonality of suffering of Jewish and Polish children', an effort in which he largely succeeds." Barbara Tepa Lupack, in The Polish Review, wrote that "Lukas in the current volume provides a gripping portrait of the Nazis' systematic genocide plan for all of Poland as well as an excellent analysis of the relationship between Poland's Jewish and gentile communities".

The book received the Janusz Korczak Literary Award from the Anti-Defamation League (ADL). The prize was withdrawn by ADL executives, then reinstated, leading to a controversy.

=== Forgotten Survivors ===
Lukas's continuing interest in the Polish tragedy during World War II culminated in his final volume, the Forgotten Survivors: Polish Christians Remember the Nazi Occupation (2004). Isabel Wollaston in her review of the book for The Slavonic and East European Review noted that "if approached as a memorial volume and/or a collection of oral histories, this is a fascinating book", but due to methodological issues and containing mostly primary accounts, "it should be handled with care and needs to be supplemented and contextualized from other sources if it is to be used for scholarly purposes".

=== The Torpedo Season ===
In 2021 Lukas published The Torpedo Season: Growing Up during World War II, a memoir of his experiences as a Polish-American child growing up during World War II. A review by John M. Grondelski for the Studia Polonijne stated that the book has insights on "sociological impact of the War on American life" and "the challenges of growing up a Polish-American boy in the United States", and concludes it is a useful work for understanding the American Polonia.

== Bibliography ==
=== Books ===
- Air Force Combat Units of World War II (contributing author), USGPO, 1961; Franklin Watts, 1963.
- Eagles East: The Army Air Forces and the Soviet Union, 1941-1945, Florida State University Press, 1970, ISBN 0-8130-0428-4.
- From Metternich to the Beatles, Mentor, 1973, ISBN 0-451-61191-8.
- The Strange Allies: the United States and Poland, 1941-1945, University of Tennessee Press, 1978, ISBN 0-87049-229-2.
- Bitter Legacy: Polish-American Relations in the Wake of World War II, University Press of Kentucky, 1982, ISBN 0-8131-1460-8.
- Out of the Inferno: Poles Remember the Holocaust, University Press of Kentucky, 1989, ISBN 0-8131-1692-9.
- The Forgotten Holocaust: The Poles Under German Occupation, 1939-1944, University of Kentucky Press, 1986; Hippocrene Books, 1990; second revised edition, 1997; third revised edition, 2012, ISBN 0-7818-0901-0.
- Did the Children Cry: Hitler's War Against Jewish and Polish Children, 1939-1945, Hippocrene Books, 1994, ISBN 0-7818-0870-7; second edition, 2016.
- Forgotten Survivors: Polish Christians Remember the Nazi Occupation, University Press of Kansas, 2004, ISBN 0-7006-1350-1.

=== Articles ===
- "The Polish Experience during the Holocaust," in A Mosaic of Victims, New York University Press, 1990
- "The Merchandising of the Holocaust", Catalyst magazine, Catholic League for Religious and Civil Rights, October 31, 1997
- "Of Stereotypes and Heroes", Catalyst magazine, Catholic League for Religious and Civil Rights, July–August 2002
- "Their Legacy is Life", Canadian Messenger, 1991
- "Jedwabne and the Selling of the Holocaust", Inside the Vatican, November 2001; reprinted in The Neighbors Respond: The Controversy over the Jedwabne Massacre in Poland, Princeton University Press, 2004
- "Irena Sendler: World War II's Polish Angel", St. Anthony Messenger, August 2008
- (in Polish) "Rozmowa z Prof. Richardem Lukasem" ("A Conversation with Prof. Richard Lukas"), Uwazam Rze Historia, wrzesień (September) 2012
- "The Encounter" (fiction), Liguorian, March 2013
- "God and Country: Catholic Chaplains during World War II", The Priest, June 2014
- "I'll Be Seeing You: The Warsaw Uprising and the Akins Crew", The Elks Magazine, June 2014
- "To Save a Life," The Priest, January 2015
- "Marcus Shook: A Mississippi Hero," in Mississippi History Now, November 2016
- "Don't Sit on the Torpedo!" (memoir excerpt), Liguorian, November 2017
- "Is It History or Propaganda?" Polish American Journal, May–June, 2023
- "A Man for All Seasons: Rev. Jan Januszewski," The Priest, May, 2024

== Awards ==
He has received awards for his work:

- National History Award of the American Institute of Aeronautics and Astronautics (1971)
- Fellow, American Council of Learned Societies, (1980)
- Doctor of Humane Letters, from Alliance College, (1987)
- Kosciuszko Foundation's Joseph B. Slotkowski Publication Fund Achievement Award
- Order of Polonia Restituta, from the Government of Poland (1988)
- Janusz Korczak Literary Award, from the Anti-Defamation League of B'nai B'rith (1994)
- American Council for Polish Culture Cultural Achievement Award (1994)
- Waclaw Jedrzejewicz History Award, from the Józef Piłsudski Institute of America (2000)
- The Catholic Press Association Award (2009)
- Mieczyslaw Haiman Award, presented by the Polish American Historical Association, (2013)
