= Francuska Street =

Street in Warsaw

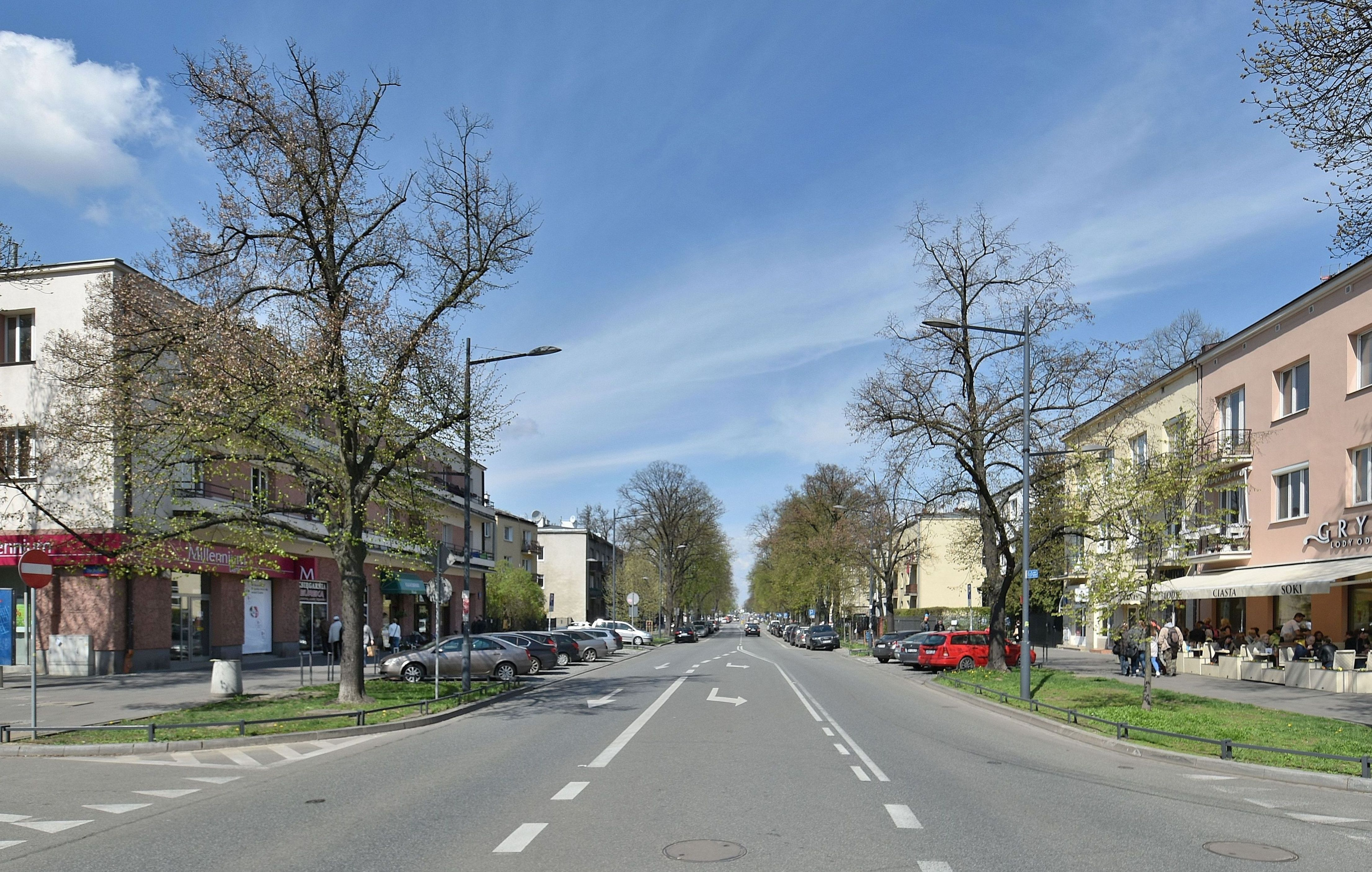
- Francuska Street at the level of Obrońców Street

- Location within Warsaw
- Part of: Saska Kępa
- Length: 750 m (2,460 ft)
- Location: Warsaw
- Coordinates: 52°14′5.2″N 21°3′13.7″E

Francuska Street is a street in Warsaw's Saska Kępa neighborhood, beginning at Przymierza Square and ending at George Washington Roundabout. Along the street, there are residential houses (including historic buildings from the interwar period), and the trees growing alongside it give it the character of an avenue.

The oldest surviving houses were built in the 1930s. In September 1939, battles took place on Francuska Street. The street retained its commercial character even after the end of World War II, which became even more apparent after 1989. Since 2006, it has been the venue for the main events of the Saska Kępa Festival, and since 2012, also for the French Festival. Its name is dedicated to France, the formal ally of the Second Polish Republic.

== Mileage and traffic ==
Francuska Street is part of the transportation route consisting of Wersalska Street–Paryska Street–Przymierza Square–Francuska Street–Washington Roundabout. It begins at the intersection with Zwycięzców Street at Przymierza Square and ends at Washington Roundabout. Along the way, it intersects with Obrońców, Walecznych, Berezyńska, and Lipska streets. Francuska Street is two-way and single-lane throughout its entire length, with dedicated turning lanes at Zwycięzców, Obrońców, Berezyńska, and Lipska streets. There are no bike lanes along the street, but it is served by public bus routes.

== History ==
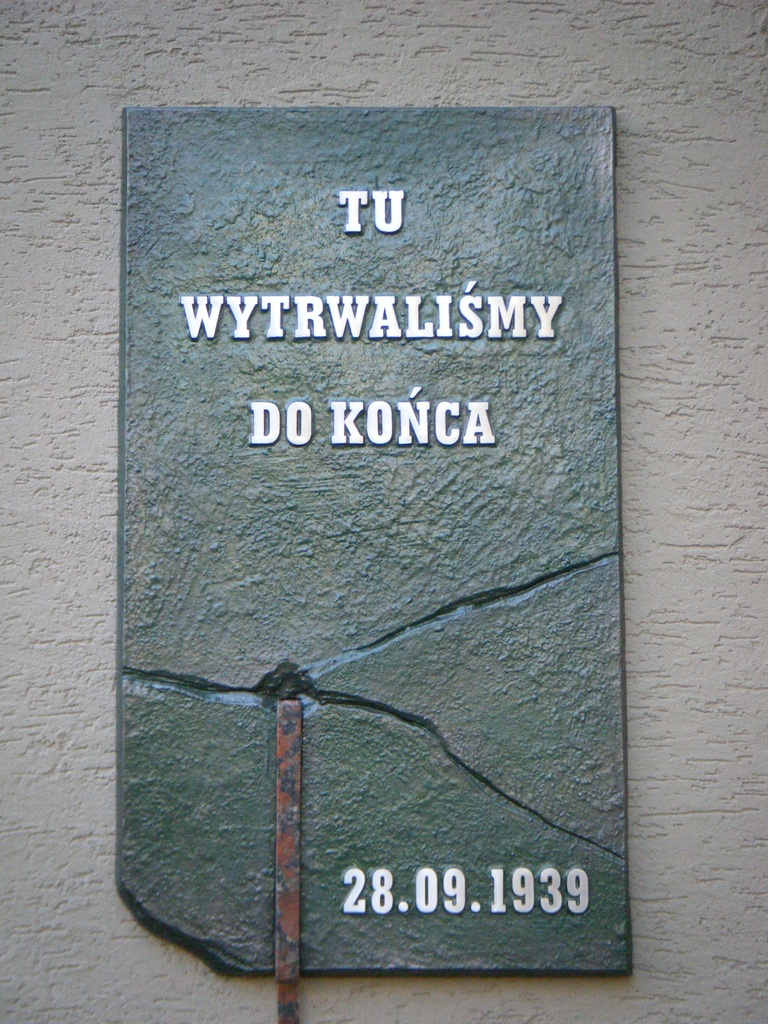
1 Francuska Street: memorial plaque

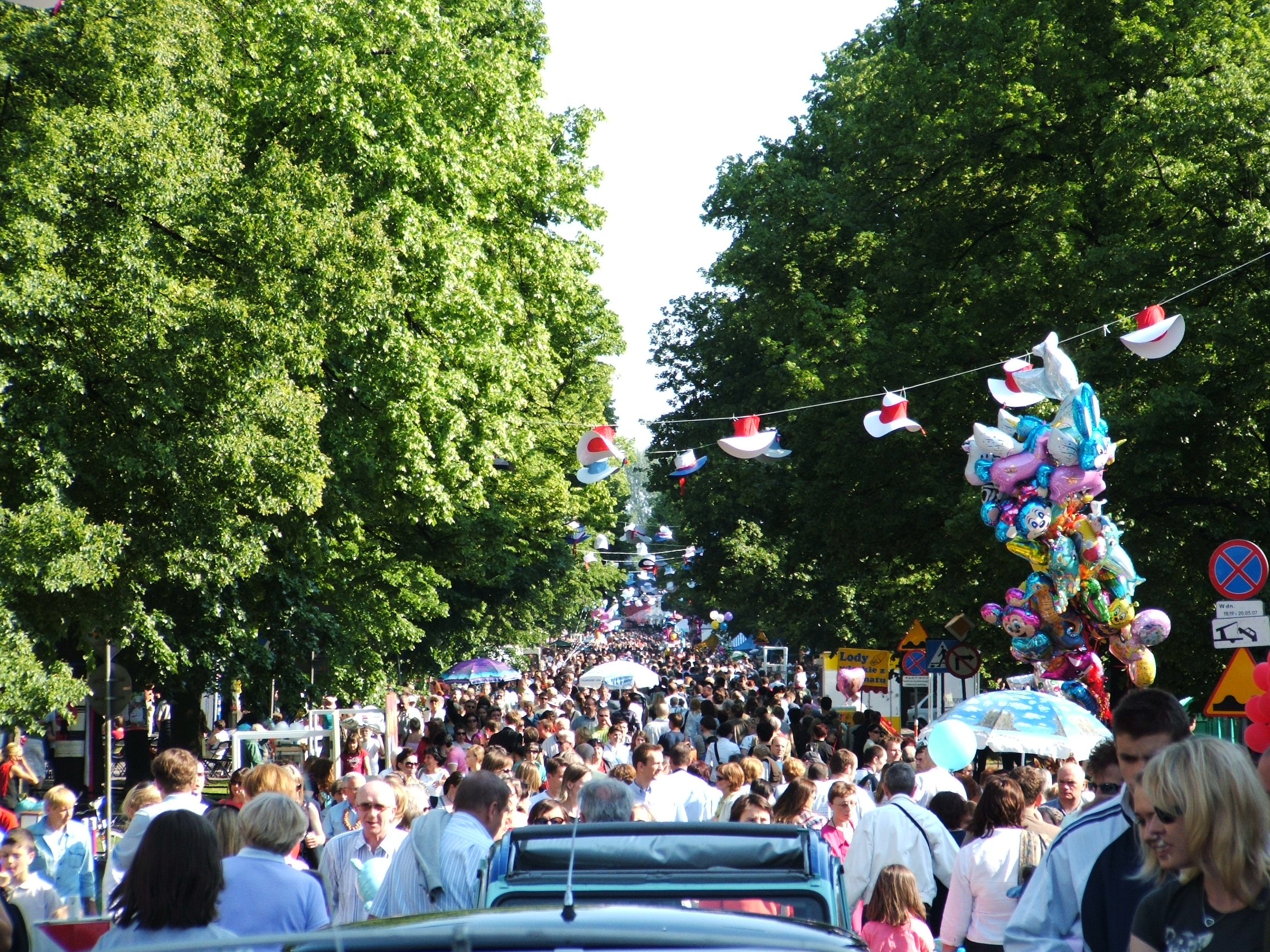
2007 Saska Kępa Festival

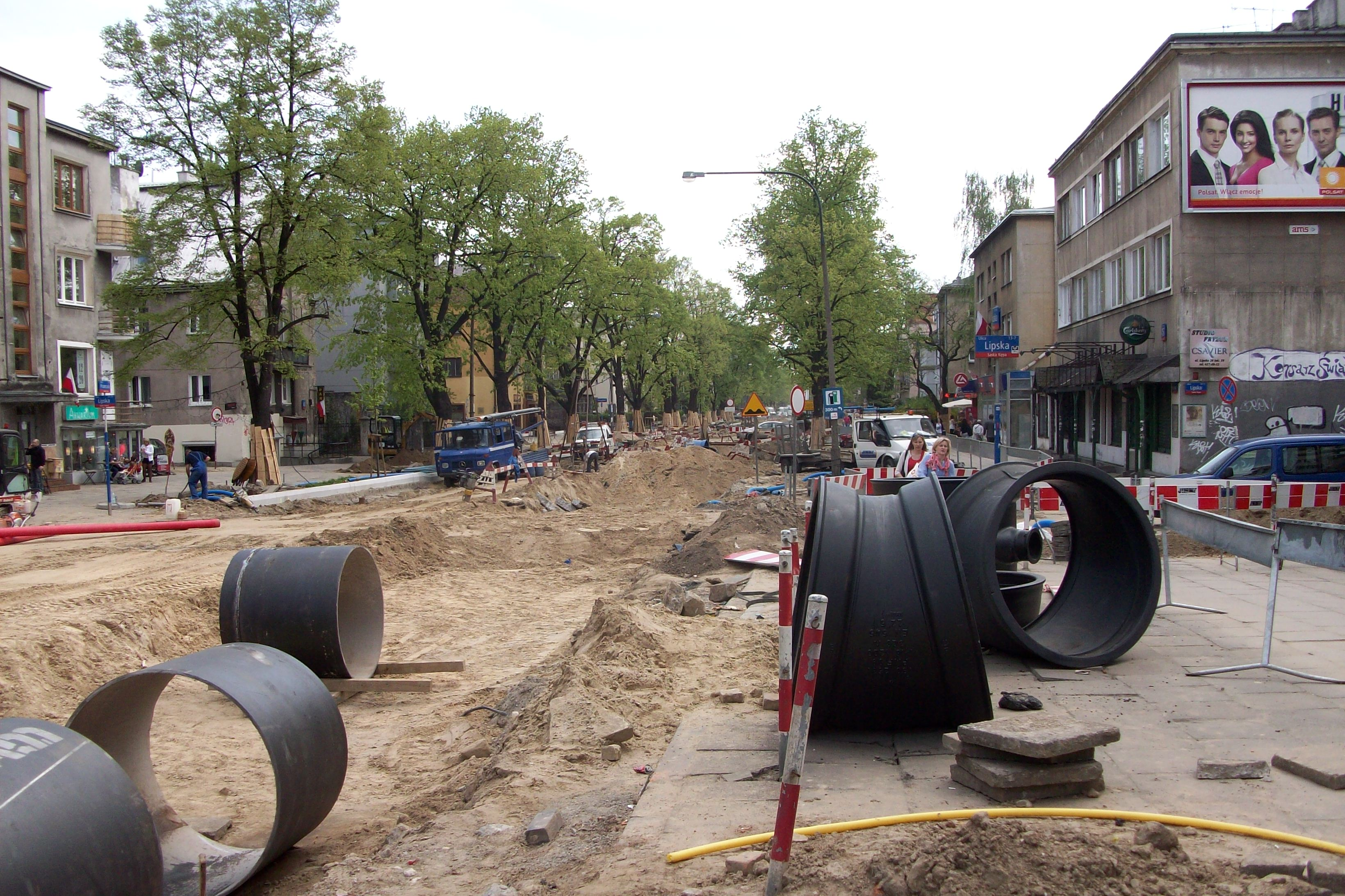
Renovations in 2010

The name of Francuska Street was established by a resolution of the Warsaw City Council on 27 September 1926.

The construction of the street began in the 1930s, facilitated by an agreement reached on 14 October 1931 between local landowners and city authorities. The development of the street was also boosted by the activities of the Water Company of the Wawer District, which led to the establishment of a network of canals. By 1935, buses of line S were already operating along the street, terminating at Washington Roundabout. In 1938, the street had an asphalt road surface and sidewalks (the asphalt was laid in 1937, making Francuska the third street in Saska Kępa to be asphalted). Greenery strips were planted along the street between 1937 and 1938.

Initially, plans were made to build a church along Francuska Street, but ultimately another location was chosen. However, more houses gradually appeared, quickly distinguishing the street from the rest of the district. As Bronisław Kopczyński wrote:

Saska Kępa, and it wasn't that long ago, in 1933 it had only a dozen or so houses and villas on Miedzeszyńska Street, then the main artery, and a few on Francuska. Fields, meadows, and orchards stretched out on both sides, with a manor house here and there.

The rapid pace of construction and delayed implementation of regulatory plans resulted in heterogeneous development. This effect elicited conflicting opinions. For example, Adam Wolmar wrote in 1935 about Francuska Street:

Palace next to palace, villa next to villa, all almost as beautiful as a dream, harmonized with the background, with the surroundings of classical geometric proportions, singing with bright planes and victorious beautiful simplicity. Indeed, Żoliborz has not a single street maintained in such noble style.

On the other hand, Marek Leykam criticized the appearance of the street:

Built with a broken line of fronts, carelessly laid out by casual 'omentrów' before the city began to lay out streets. One house stands next to another, each different in its ugliness. A four-story tenement with a nice gable wall next to a modernly drawn villa, touching a tenement house blushing with its roof. Loose construction amidst dense, anarchy of all possible forms.

During the defense of Warsaw in September 1939, a crucial barricade was located at the corner of Francuska and Zwycięzców streets. Polish soldiers from the 21st Infantry Regiment "Children of Warsaw", the 21st Vistula Uhlan Regiment, and the 336th Infantry Regiment fought here against the German 44th Infantry Regiment from East Prussia, whose arrival was preceded by Luftwaffe bombings. Seven defenders were awarded the Silver Crosses of the Virtuti Militari as early as 27 September 1939.

In 1942, in one of the apartments on Francuska Street, Anna Jachnina wrote the lyrics of the song Siekiera, motyka.

After the end of the German occupation, the Capital Reconstruction Bureau decided to maintain the street's existing character, i.e., its role as both a transportation route and a commercial area. During the socialist realism period, plans were made to build a monumental colonnade surrounding the southern semicircle of Washington Roundabout with an interruption at the entrance to Francuska Street. However, the project was not realized, and residential buildings were erected instead. After years of transformation, the street became even more distinctly characterized by its commercial and service functions.

Since 2006, Francuska Street has been the main venue for events during the Saska Kępa Festival. In 2010, it underwent a major renovation. The surface, sidewalks, parking spaces, and bus stops were all replaced, and separate lanes for turning into subordinate streets were designated. On 22 December 2010, pre-Christmas illuminations were inaugurated. In 2011, plaques commemorating the barricade from the September 1939 battles were unveiled.

== Buildings ==
- House at 1 Francuska Street – the building housed Bronisław Koniuszy's gallery, and later the DAES auction house. In 2009 and 2011, the building was reprivatized under the so-called Bierut Decree. At that time, there were 14 registered residents.
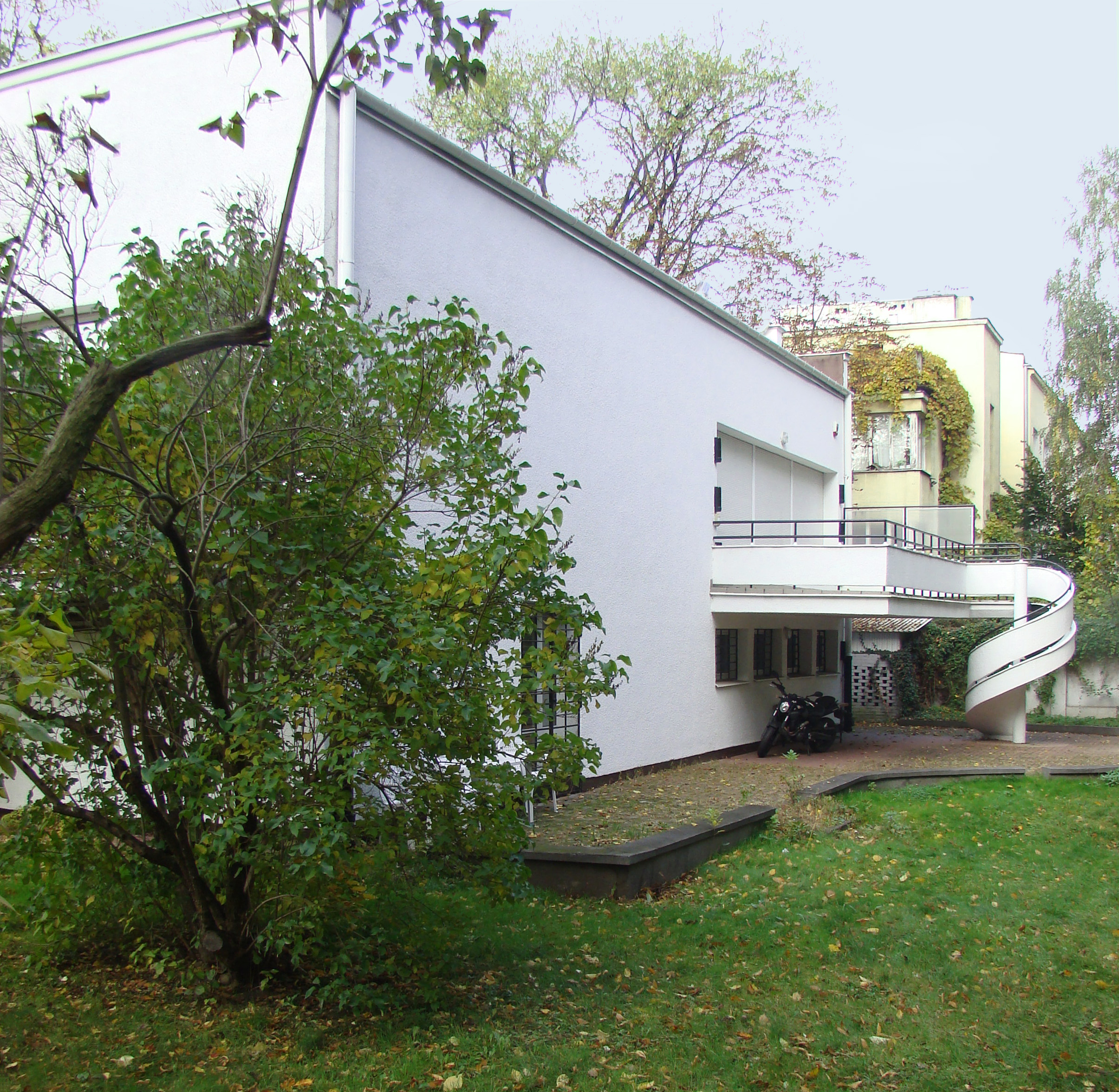
- 2 Francuska Street
  House at 2 Francuska Street – the Łepkowski villa from 1933 to 1934 designed by Lucjan Korngold and Piotr Maria Lubiński. Its most characteristic features are on the garden side, including a spacious terrace accessible via winding stairs. From the beginning, the building received favorable reviews and was cited as an example of Le Corbusier's ideas. It is considered one of the most valuable functionalist landmarks in Saska Kępa.
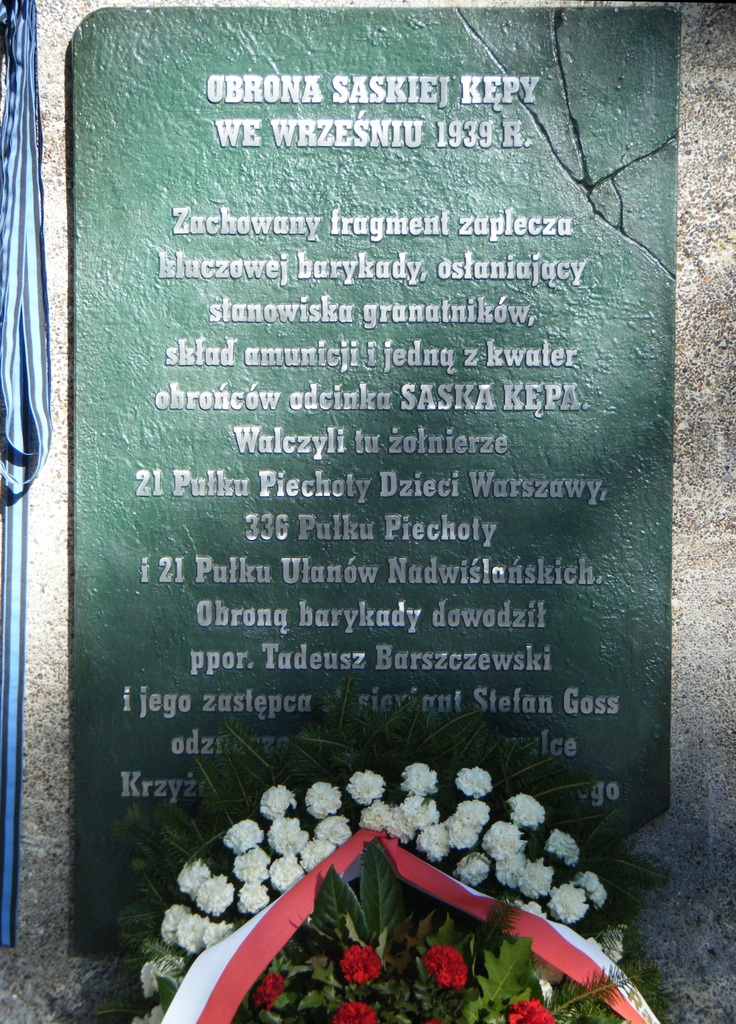
- 4 Francuska Street: memorial plaque
  House at 4 Francuska Street – the Kossakowski villa from 1930 designed by Dionizy Cieślak. A characteristic feature of the house is the openwork pattern of the balcony railing supported by three pillars, repeated on the terrace enclosure and staircase railing leading to the high ground floor. The villa was featured in the film Black Pearl starring Eugeniusz Bodo and Lena Żelichowska. The house was inhabited by Kazimierz Kossakowski. In September 1939 and January 1945, the house was known as one of the few places in the area where there was a source of drinking water, thanks to a pump installed there in 1931. Previously, on the property, there was a Royal Oak (Saxon Oak) destroyed during the war, whose successor was planted in 2012 on Nobel Street. In 2011, the building was reprivatized. At that time, there were 9 residents.
- Building at 5A Francuska Street – the plot was reprivatized in 1998.
- Building at 6 Francuska Street – former location of Eugeniusz and Irena Wojnar's Bistro café. Regular guests included Zbigniew Sawan, Jan Suzin, and Irena Dziedzic. Bistro gained popularity, among other things, thanks to Ryszard Sielicki's waltz Na Francuskiej, sung by Rena Rolska.
- Building at 9 Francuska Street – the plot was reprivatized in 2002.
- House at 10 Francuska Street – the Prochman apartment building from 1936 designed by Zygmunt Konrad.
- Building at 11 Francuska Street – originally an architecturally unremarkable house where tailoring and sewing courses were held. Currently, a detached villa with characteristic arches, housing, among others, the Dom Polski restaurant. In 2008, the plot was reprivatized. At that time, there was one person registered there.
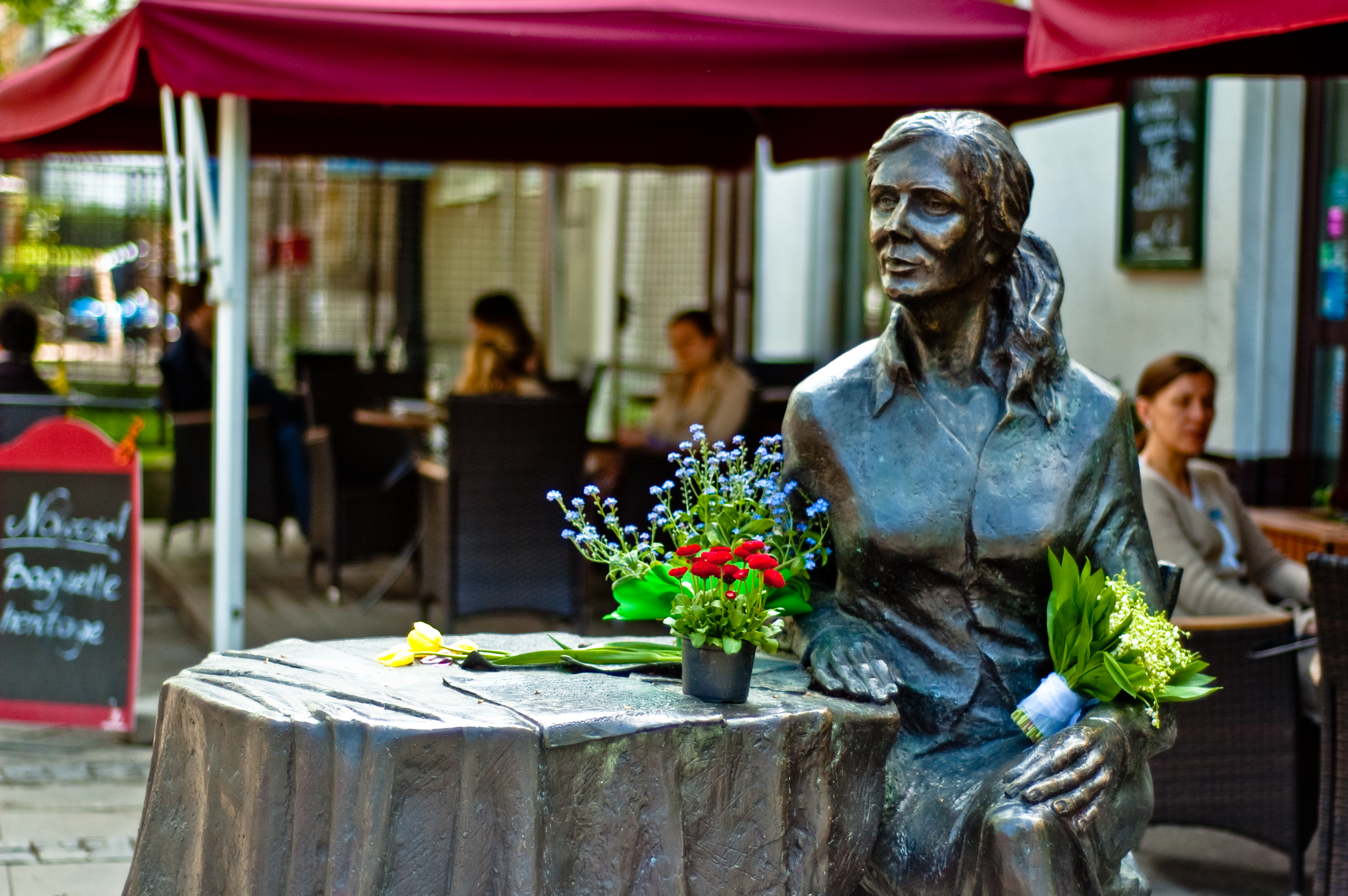
- Agnieszka Osiecka monument
  Corner of Francuska and Obrońców streets – a sculpture of Agnieszka Osiecka in the form of a memorial bench. It depicts a young artist sitting at a café table. The sculpture was created by Dariusz and Teresa Kowalski. It was unveiled during the Saska Kępa Festival on 19 May 2007.
- House at 12 Francuska Street – the Lachert tenement house from 1934 designed by Bohdan Lachert and Józef Szanajca. The house is an example of one of the first gallery-style blocks in Poland. Its original appearance was altered due to subsequent renovations over the years – ground-floor apartments were converted into shops, fenced gardens on the street side were removed, and the facade's clinker covering disappeared. Danuta Mostwin lived in the house, among others.
- Building at 12A Francuska Street – the tenement house was reprivatized in 2005. At that time, there were 21 residents registered.
- Building at 14 Francuska Street – the building housed one of the Pakulski Brothers' shops.
- House at 15 Francuska Street – a house from 1935 designed by Julian Ambroziewicz. The building is one of the examples of using a balcony as a facade decoration element. While on the western facade (from the courtyard), it is uniform and divided only by a glazed stairwell, on the street side, there are two rows of balconies running almost the entire length of the facade. The building also houses a flower shop, the interior of which was designed by Barbara Kopankiewicz-Kielanowska. A plaque commemorating Anna Jachnina's writing of the lyrics to the song Siekiera, motyka is located on the house's wall.
- House at 18 Francuska Street – the Avenarius house (later Jerzy Sawicki's) from 1932 designed by Dionizy Cieślak.
- House at 24 Francuska Street – a multi-family house from 1937 designed by Stanisław Barylski.
- House at 25 Francuska Street – a multi-family house Guterkunsta from 1937 designed by Adolf Inatowicz-Łubiański.
- House at 26 Francuska Street – a multi-family house from 1937 designed by Stanisław Barylski.
- House at 27 Francuska Street – a house where Stanisław Świdwiński lived, among others.
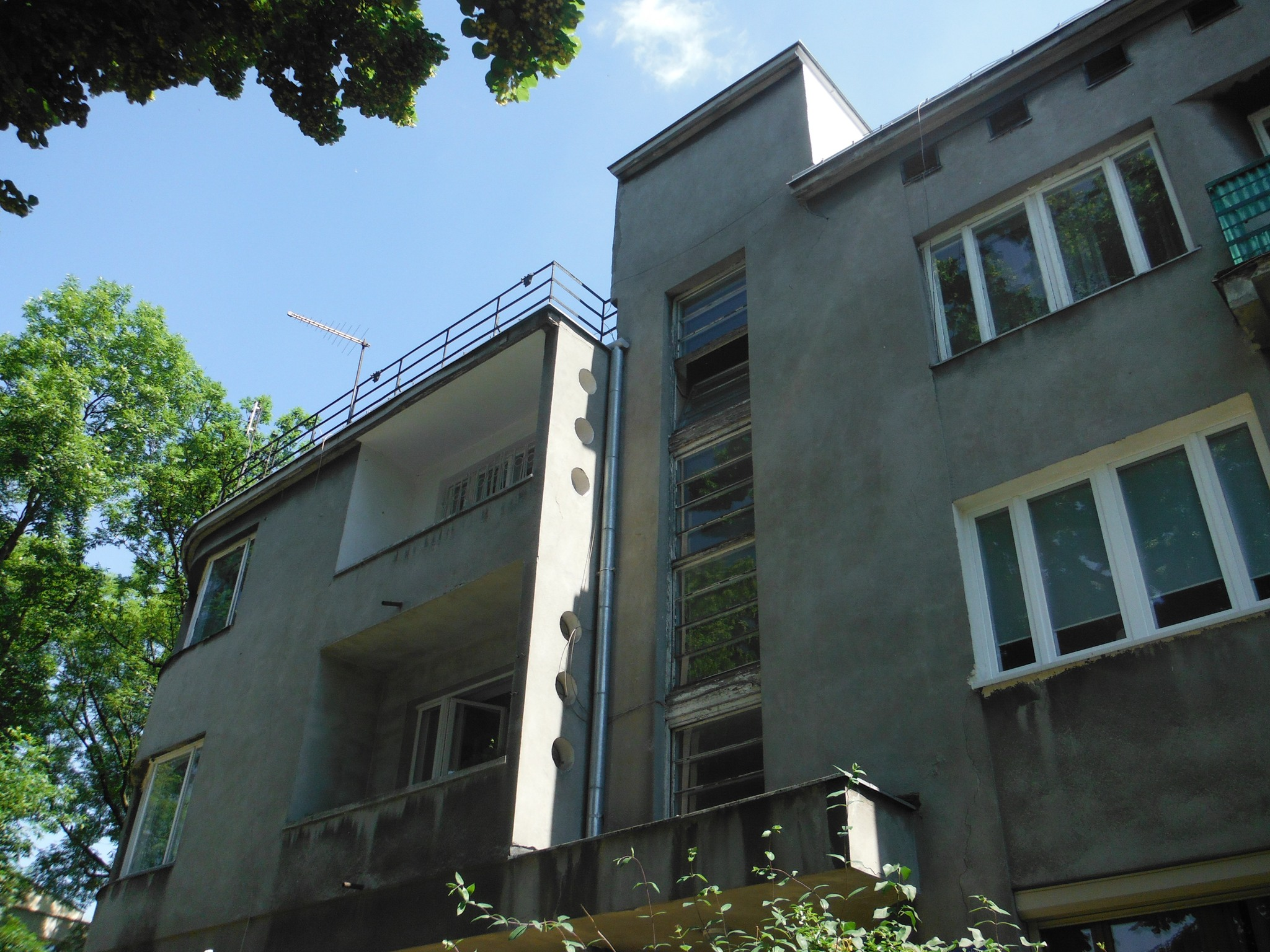
- 28 Francuska Street
  House at 28 Francuska Street – a multi-family house from around 1937 designed by Hipolit Rutkowski and Józef Łęczycki. It is distinguished by zigzag bay windows, which contribute to better lighting of rooms on the north side. Another characteristic element is a large recreational terrace with a high balustrade. The zigzag motif corresponds with the appearance of the adjacent house at 34 Walecznych Street. The building is listed in the register of monuments.
- House at 30 Francuska Street – a multi-family house from around 1938 designed by Stefan Putowski and Tadeusz Kaszubski. In 2009 and 2011, the building was taken over by Marek Mossakowski based on reprivatization decisions. At that time, there were 12 residents.
- Building at 31 Francuska Street – the building houses, among other things, the Baobab café. Previously, there were pubs such as Nadwiślańska, Podhalańska, and later Sax – a place associated with the frequent presence of Agnieszka Osiecka.
- House at 32 Francuska Street – the multi-family house of engineer Dzięgielewski from 1937 designed by Jan Idzikowski.
- House at 34 Francuska Street – the seat of the Saski Family Center run by Caritas Internationalis.
- House at 36 Francuska Street – a house where Ewa Bandrowska-Turska lived, among others.
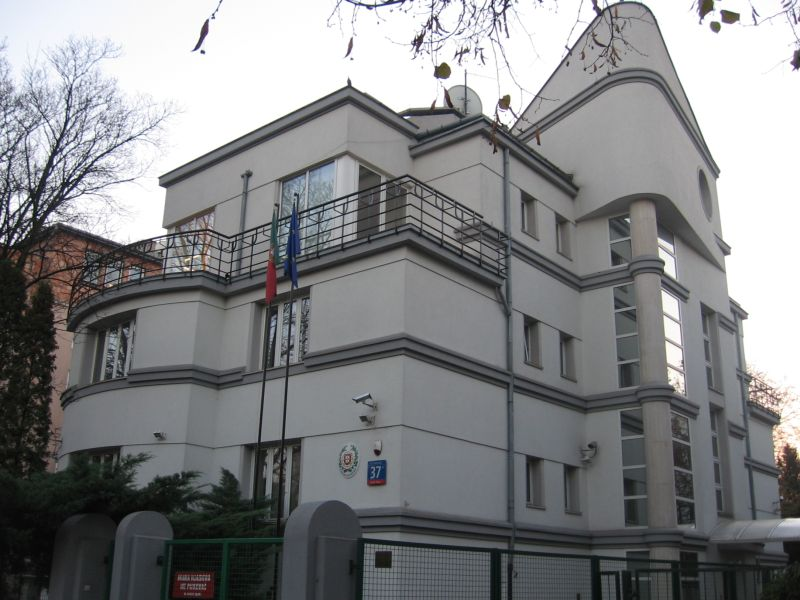
- 37 Francuska Street
  House at 37 Francuska Street – the Klarner family villa from 1937 designed by Bolesław Żurkowski. In 1995, the villa was reprivatized. In 1996, it was rebuilt, disrupting the original symmetry and balance of proportions. The intervention in the structure of the pre-war building, which became the Embassy of Portugal for several years, sparked controversy. The house was inhabited by Czesław Klarner, among others.
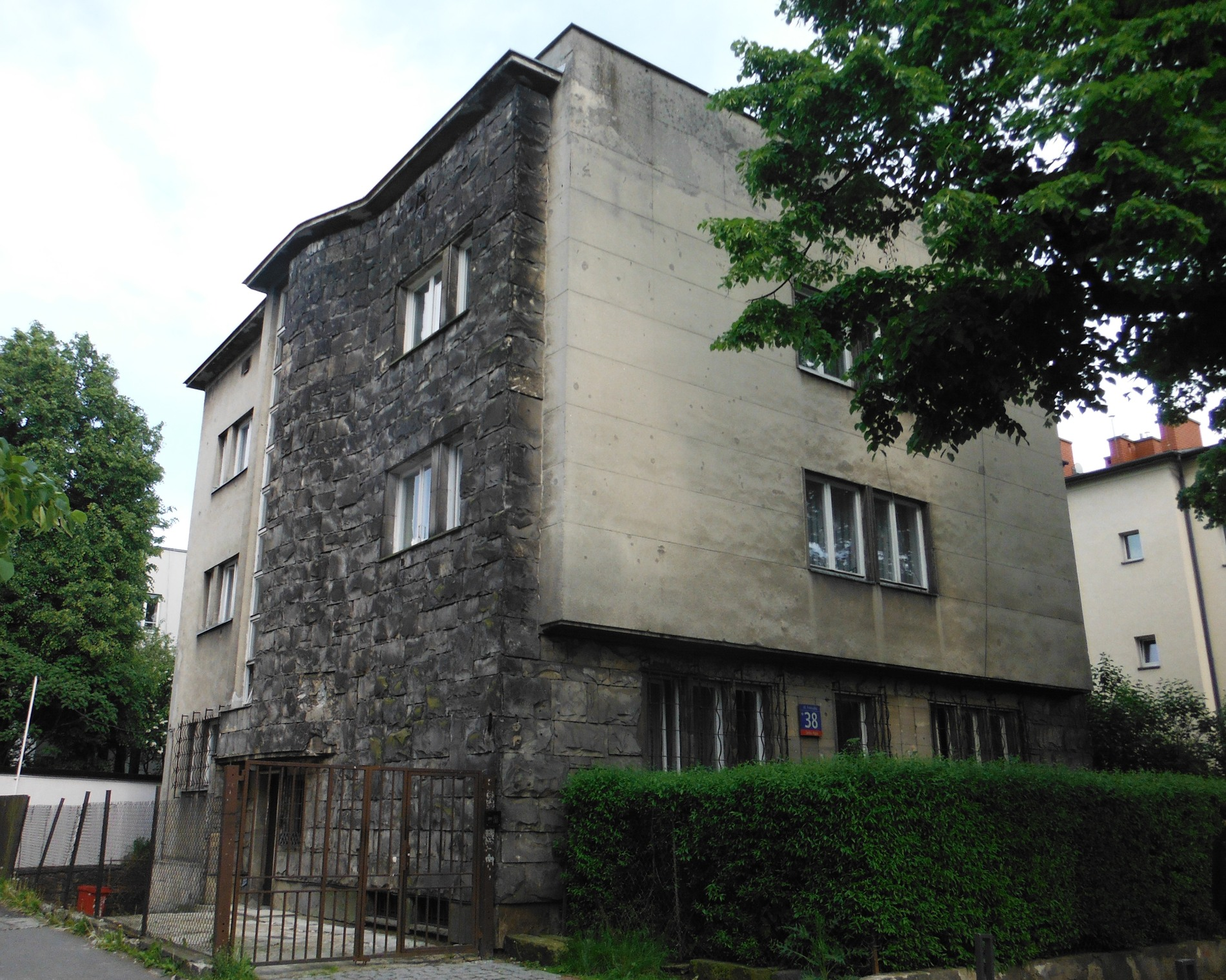
- 38 Francuska Street
  House at 38 Francuska Street – the Darlewski tenement house from around 1938 designed by Jerzy Woyzbun. The building exhibits some similarities to Bohdan Pniewski's designs, with whom Woyzbun collaborated. Several elements are reminiscent of Pniewski's villa on Na Skarpie Alley – a small number of windows on the front and the massiveness of the walls above give the building the appearance of a defensive structure. Typical of the late 1930s fashion is the combination of wild materials (stone) with a smooth wall and soft lines (north elevation) with straight lines. The building is listed in the register of monuments.
- House at 40 Francuska Street – a house where Zofia de Bondy lived, among others. In 2009, the legal successors of the former owners were awarded over 1 million złoty in compensation as part of the reprivatization process.
- Building at 25 Berezyńska Street (corner of Francuska Street) – a building from 1999 designed by an architectural team. The building serves as the headquarters of the architectural design office founded by Stefan Kuryłowicz, the Kuryłowicz & Associates Studio. The facade of the building features materials most commonly used by the studio, such as architectural concrete and travertine. Many maritime details are applied, such as portholes, balconies, and railings.
- House at 45 Francuska Street – the plot was reprivatized in 2001.
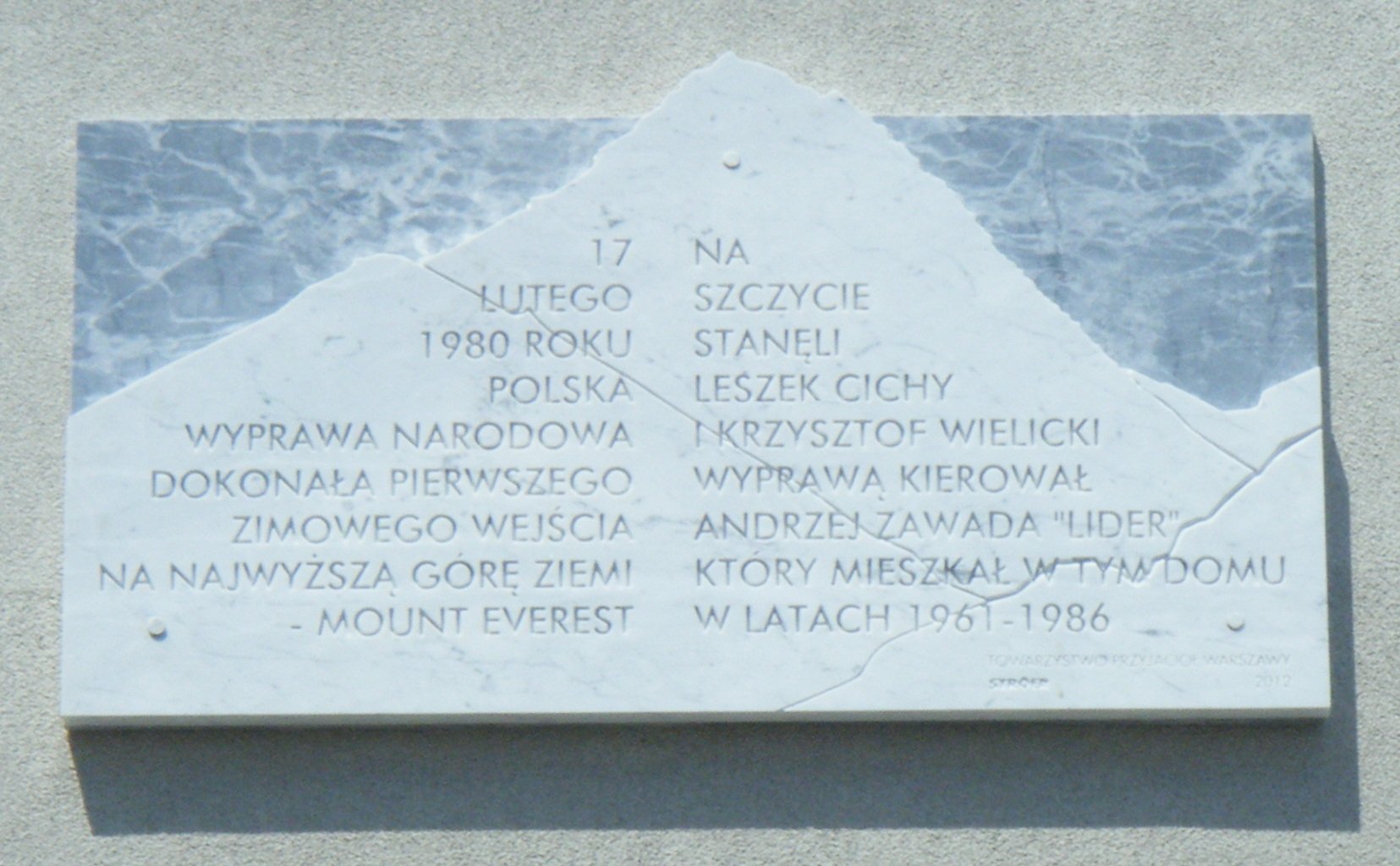
- 49 Francuska Street: memorial plaque
  House at 49 Francuska Street – a house where Andrzej Zawada lived, among others. A plaque on the house commemorates the expedition to Mount Everest led by him (with Krzysztof Wielicki and Leszek Cichy).
- House at 50 Francuska Street – the plot was reprivatized in 2011. At that time, there were 9 people registered.

== Bibliography ==
- Faryna-Paszkiewicz, Hanna (2001). Saska Kępa (in Polish). Warsaw: Murator. ISBN 83-915407-0-7.
- Piwowar, Magdalena; Piątek, Grzegorz; Trybuś, Jarosław (2012). SAS. Ilustrowany atlas architektury Saskiej Kępy (in Polish). Centrum Architektury. ISBN 978-83-934574-0-3.
- Faryna-Paszkiewicz, Hanna, ed. (2004). Saska Kępa w listach, opisach, wspomnieniach... (in Polish). Warsaw: Kowalska/Stiasny.
