= Western betrayal =

Concept in international relations among European countries

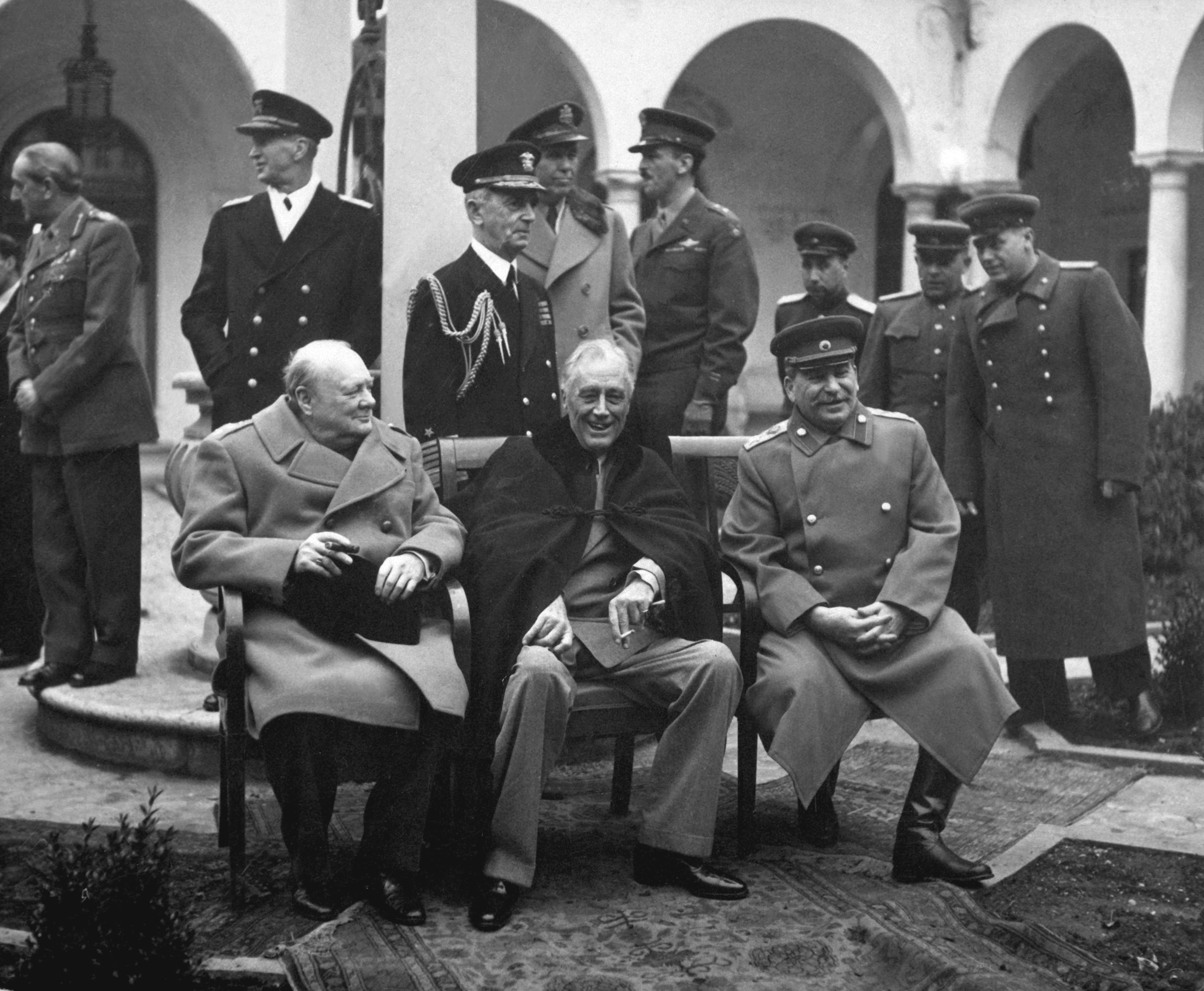
The "Big Three" at the Yalta Conference: Winston Churchill (UK), Franklin D. Roosevelt (USA), and Joseph Stalin (USSR)

Western betrayal is the view and perception that the Western Allies (specifically the United Kingdom, France, and the United States) failed to meet their legal, diplomatic, military, and moral obligations to the Czechoslovaks and Poles before, during, and after World War II. It also sometimes refers to the treatment of other Central and Eastern European states by those three nations.

The concept primarily derives from several events, including British and French appeasement towards Nazi Germany during its 1938 occupation of Czechoslovakia and the perceived failure of Britain and France to adequately assist the Poles during the German invasion of Poland in 1939. It also derives from concessions made by American and British political leaders to the Soviet Union during the Tehran, Yalta, and Potsdam conferences and their limited response during the 1944 Warsaw Uprising along with post-war events, which allocated Poland to the Soviet sphere of influence as part of the Eastern Bloc.

Historically, such views were intertwined with some of the most significant geopolitical events of the 20th century, including the rise and fall of Nazi Germany, the emergence of the Soviet Union as a dominant superpower exerting control over large parts of Europe after World War II, and various treaties, alliances, and positions during the Cold War. The view of the "Western betrayal" has been criticized as political scapegoating by Central and Eastern Europeans.

== Perception of betrayal ==
According to professors Charlotte Bretherton and John Vogler, Western betrayal is a reference to a sense of historical and moral responsibility for the West's abandonment of Central and Eastern Europe at the end of the Second World War. In Central and Eastern Europe, the interpretation of the outcomes of the Munich Crisis of 1938 and the Yalta Conference of 1945 as a betrayal of Central and Eastern Europe by Western powers has been used by Central and Eastern European leaders to put pressure on Western countries to acquiesce to more recent political requests such as membership in NATO and EU.

In a few cases deliberate duplicity is alleged, whereby secret agreements or intentions are claimed to have existed in conflict with understandings given publicly. An example is British Prime Minister Winston Churchill's covert concordance with the Soviet Union, in which he stated that the Atlantic Charter did not apply to the Baltic states. Given the strategic requirements of winning the war, retired American diplomat Charles G. Stefan argued Churchill and U.S. President Franklin D. Roosevelt had no option but to accept the demands of their ally, Soviet Premier Joseph Stalin, at the Tehran, Yalta, and Potsdam Conferences.

During the Cold War, the lack of Western intervention during the 1953 East German uprising, the 1956 Hungarian Revolution, and the 1968 Prague Spring reinforced perceptions of abandonment across the Eastern Bloc. While historians often distinguish this from a literal legal "betrayal", noting that the US was bound by Yalta and Potsdam agreements and sought to avoid nuclear conflict, the perception was amplified by US "rollback" rhetoric, which created false expectations of support that ultimately failed to materialize. Historiographically, the "Western betrayal" concept evolved from a specific legal grievance into a broader psychological framework and national coping mechanism for Central and Eastern Europeans,. Scholars suggest this narrative allowed societies to manage the trauma of Soviet repression, with some arguments (such as those by Ilya Prizel) pointing to a "damaged self" that fueled regional resentment, and others (e.g., Grigory Yavlinsky) highlighting how historical compromises, such as Munich and Yalta, functioned as enduring "psychological events" that influenced later debates regarding NATO expansion.

In the post-war era, the language of Western betrayal was also appropriated by collaborationist diaspora groups, such as surviving anti-Soviet Cossack formations, to reframe their mandatory treaty repatriations to the Soviet Union as an act of Allied duplicity. By adopting this specific vocabulary, early émigré literature systematically conflated the legal and diplomatic grievances of occupied sovereign nations with the status of defeated Axis military units, substituting their documented record of regional counter-insurgency and war crimes for a narrative of passive anti-communist martyrdom.

=== Criticism of the concept ===
Colin Powell stated that he did not think "betrayal is the appropriate word" regarding the Allies' role in the Warsaw Uprising. While complaints of "betrayal" are common in politics generally, the idea of a western betrayal can also be seen as a political scapegoat in both Central and Eastern Europe and a partisan electioneering phrase among the former Western Allies. Historian Athan Theoharis maintains betrayal myths were used in part by those opposing US membership in the United Nations. The word "Yalta" came to stand for the appeasement of world communism and abandonment of freedom.

== Czechoslovakia ==
=== Munich Conference ===
The term Betrayal of the West (Czech: zrada Západu, Slovak: zrada Západu) was coined after the 1938 Munich Conference when Czechoslovakia was forced to cede the mostly German-populated Sudetenland to Germany. The region contained the Czechoslovak border fortifications and means of viable defence against German invasion. Poland would take Trans-Olza from Czechoslovakia, while the First Vienna Award returned territories to Hungary. The next year, by the proclamation of the Slovak State, Czechoslovakia was dissolved, the next day the remainder of Carpathian Ruthenia was occupied and annexed by Hungary, while the next day Germany occupied the remaining Czech lands and proclaimed the Protectorate of Bohemia and Moravia.

Along with Italy and Nazi Germany, the Munich treaty was signed by Britain and France, both allies of Czechoslovakia. Czechoslovakia was allied by treaty with France so it would be obliged to help Czechoslovakia if it was attacked. Czech politicians joined the newspapers in regularly using the term Western betrayal and it, along with the associated feelings, became a stereotype among Czechs. The Czech terms Mnichov (Munich), Mnichovská zrada (Munich betrayal), Mnichovský diktát (Munich Dictate), and zrada spojenců (betrayal of the allies) were coined at the same time and have the same meaning. Poet František Halas published a poem with verse about "ringing bell of betrayal".

Then Member of Parliament for Epping, Winston Churchill said: "Britain and France had to choose between war and dishonour. They chose dishonour. They will have war".

=== Prague uprising ===
On 5 May 1945, the citizens of Prague learned of the American invasion of Czechoslovakia by the US Third Army and revolted against German occupation. In four days of street fighting, thousands of Czechs were killed. Tactical conditions were favourable for an American advance, and General Patton, in command of the army, requested permission to continue eastward to the Vltava river in order to aid the Czech partisans fighting in Prague. This was denied by General Eisenhower, who was disinclined to accept American casualties or risk antagonising the Soviet Union. As a result, Prague was liberated on 9 May by the Red Army, significantly increasing the standing of the Czechoslovak Communist Party. According to a British diplomat, this was the moment that "Czechoslovakia was now definitely lost to the West."

== Poland ==
=== World War I aftermath ===
In the late 1920s and early 1930s, a complex set of alliances was established among the nations of Europe, in the hope of preventing future wars (either with Germany or the Soviet Union). With the rise of Nazism in Germany, this system of alliances was strengthened by the signing of a series of "mutual assistance" alliances between France, Britain, and Poland (Franco-Polish alliance). This agreement with France stated that in the event of war the other allies were to fully mobilise and carry out a "ground intervention within two weeks" in support of the ally being attacked. The Anglo-Polish alliance stated that in the event of hostilities with a European power, the other contracting party would give "all the support and assistance in its power."

According to Krzysztof Źwikliński, additionally representatives of the Western powers made several military promises to Poland, including designs as those made by British General William Edmund Ironside in his July 1939 talks with Marshall Rydz-Śmigły who promised an attack from the direction of Black Sea, or placing a British aircraft carrier in the Baltic. However, the Anglo-Polish alliance did not make that commitment, and the British commitment to France was for four divisions in Europe within 30 days of the outbreak of war, which was met.

=== Beginning of World War II, 1939 ===
On the eve of the Second World War, the Polish government tried to buy as much armaments as it could and was asking for arms loans from Britain and France. As a result of that in the summer of 1939 Poland placed orders for 160 French Morane-Saulnier M.S.406 fighters, and for 111 British airplanes (100 light bombers Fairey Battle, 10 Hurricanes, and 1 Spitfire). Although some of these planes had been shipped to Poland before 1 September 1939, none took part in combat. Shipments were interrupted due to the outbreak of war. The total amount of the loan from British government was also much smaller than asked for. Britain agreed to lend 8 million pounds, but Poland was asking for 60 million.

Upon the invasion of Poland by Nazi Germany in September 1939, after giving Germany an ultimatum on 1 September, Britain and France declared war on Germany on 3 September, and a British naval blockade of Germany was initiated. General Gort was appointed commander of the British Expeditionary Force (BEF), and placed under the command of French General Gamelin of the North-eastern Theatre of Operations, as agreed before the war. On 4 September, an RAF raid against German warships in harbour was conducted, and the BEF began its shipment to France.

The German forces reached Warsaw on 8 September, and on 14 September, Marshal Edward Rydz-Śmigły ordered Polish forces to withdraw to the Romanian Bridgehead. On 17 September, the Soviet Union invaded Poland, and Polish Army in the field was effectively defeated before the divisions of the BEF could arrive in France. The first two BEF divisions, which took their place in the French line and change of command, on 3 October, and two further BEF divisions took their place in the French line on 12 October.

France had committed to undertaking a ground offensive within two weeks of the outbreak of war. The French initiated full mobilisation and began the limited Saar Offensive on 7 September, sending 40 divisions into the region. The French assault was slowed down by out-dated doctrines, minefields, and the French lacked mine detectors. When the French reached artillery range of the Siegfried Line, they found that their shells could not penetrate the German defences. The French decided to regroup an attack on 20 September, but when Poland was invaded by the Soviet Union on 17 September, any further assault was called off. Around 13 September, the Polish military envoy to France, general Stanisław Burhardt-Bukacki, upon receiving the text of the message sent by Gamelin, alerted Marshal Śmigły: "I received the message by General Gamelin. Please don't believe a single word in the dispatch".

It had been decided that no major air operations against Germany would take place. This was due to French concerns over reprisals on RAF launches from French airfields, against targets in Germany, so most British bomber activity over Germany was the dropping of propaganda leaflets and reconnaissance. This theme would continue in subsequent Anglo-French Supreme War Council meetings. Afterwards, French military leader Maurice Gamelin issued orders prohibiting Polish military envoys Lieutenant Wojciech Fyda and General Stanisław Burhardt-Bukacki from contacting him. In his post-war diaries, General Edmund Ironside, the chief of the Imperial General Staff, commented on French promises: "The French had lied to the Poles in saying they are going to attack. There is no idea of it".

On 17 September 1939 the Soviet Union invaded Poland, as agreed in advance with Germany following the signing of the Molotov–Ribbentrop Pact. Britain and France did not take any significant action in response to the Soviet invasion. However, the terms of the Anglo-Polish alliance specifically applied to invasion from Germany only.

France and Britain were unable to launch a successful land attack on Germany in September 1939, and Poland was overcome by both the Germans and Soviets on 6 October, with the last Polish units capitulating that day following the battle of Kock. However, even by the end of October, the still-forming British Expeditionary Force totaled only 4 divisions compared to the 25 German divisions in Western Germany, making a British invasion of Germany unlikely to succeed.

=== Tehran, 1943 ===
In November 1943, the Big Three (the USSR, US, and UK) met at the Tehran Conference. President Roosevelt and PM Churchill officially agreed that the eastern borders of Poland would roughly follow the Curzon Line. The Polish government-in-exile was not a party to this decision made in secret. The resulting loss of the Kresy, or "eastern territories", approximately 48% of Poland's pre-war territory, to the Soviet Union was seen by the London Poles in exile as another "betrayal" by their Western "Allies". However, it was no secret to the Allies that before his death in July 1943 General Władysław Sikorski, Prime Minister of Poland's London-based government in exile had been the originator, and not Stalin, of the concept of a westward shift of Poland's boundaries along an Oder–Neisse line as compensation for relinquishing Poland's eastern territories as part of a Polish rapprochement with the USSR. Józef Retinger, who was Sikorski's special political advisor at the time, was also in agreement with Sikorski's concept of Poland's realigned post-war borders, later in his memoirs Retinger wrote: "At the Tehran Conference, in November 1943, the Big Three agreed that Poland should receive territorial compensation in the West, at Germany's expense, for the land it was to lose to Russia in Central and Eastern Europe. This seemed like a fair bargain."

Churchill told Stalin he could settle the issue with the Poles once a decision was made in Tehran, however he never consulted the Polish leadership.

=== Warsaw Uprising, 1944 ===
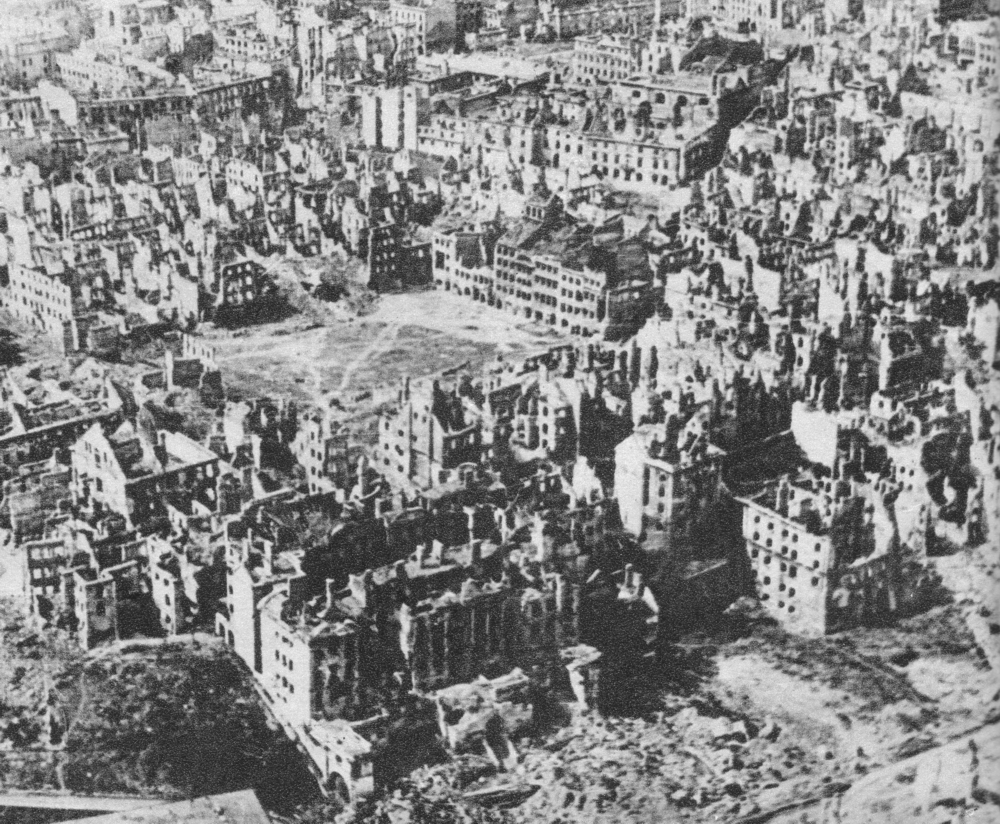
During World War II 85% of buildings in Warsaw were destroyed by German troops.

Since the establishment of the Polish government-in-exile in Paris and then in London, the military commanders of the Polish army were focusing most of their efforts on preparation of a future all-national uprising against Germany. Finally the plans for Operation Tempest were prepared and on 1 August 1944, the Warsaw Uprising started. The Uprising was an armed struggle by the Polish Home Army to liberate Warsaw from German occupation and Nazi rule.

Despite the fact that Polish and later Royal Air Force (RAF) planes flew missions over Warsaw dropping supplies from 4 August on, the United States Army Air Force (USAAF) planes did not join the operation. The Allies specifically requested the use of Red Army airfields near Warsaw on 20 August but were refused by Stalin on 22 August (he referred to the insurrectionists as "a handful of criminals"). After Stalin's objections to support for the uprising, Churchill telegraphed Roosevelt on 25 August and proposed sending planes in defiance of Stalin and to "see what happens". Roosevelt replied on 26 August that "I do not consider it advantageous to the long-range general war prospect for me to join you in the proposed message to Uncle Joe." The commander of the British air drop, Air Marshal Sir John Slessor, later stated, "How, after the fall of Warsaw, any responsible statesman could trust the Russian Communist further than he could kick him, passes the comprehension of ordinary men."

=== Moscow Conference, October 1944 ===
When the Prime Minister of the Polish government-in-exile Stanisław Mikołajczyk attended the October 1944 Moscow Conference, he was convinced he was coming to discuss borders that were still disputed, while Stalin believed everything had already been settled. This was the principal reason for the failure of the Polish Prime Minister's mission to Moscow. The Polish premier allegedly begged for inclusion of Lwów and Wilno in the new Polish borders, but got the following reply from Vyacheslav Molotov: "There is no use discussing that; it was all settled in Tehran."

=== Yalta, 1945 ===
The Yalta Conference (4-11 February 1945) acknowledged the era of Soviet domination of Central and Eastern Europe, subsequent to the Soviet occupation of these lands as they advanced against Nazi Germany. This domination lasted until the end of Communist rule in Central and Eastern Europe in late 1989 and the collapse of the Soviet Union in December 1991 and left bitter memories of Western betrayal and Soviet dominance in the collective memory of the region. To many Polish Americans, the Yalta conference "constituted a betrayal" of Poland and the Atlantic Charter. "After World War II," remarked Strobe Talbott, "many countries in the (center and) east suffered half a century under the shadow of Yalta." Territories which the Soviet Union had occupied during World War II in 1939 (with the exception of the Białystok area) were permanently annexed, and most of their Polish inhabitants expelled: today these territories are part of Belarus, Ukraine, and Lithuania. The factual basis of this decision was the result of a forged referendum from November 1939 in which the "huge majority" of voters accepted the incorporation of these lands into western Belarus and western Ukraine. In compensation, Poland was given former German territory (the so-called Recovered Territories): the southern half of East Prussia and all of Pomerania and Silesia, up to the Oder–Neisse line. The German population of these territories was expelled in masses and these territories were subsequently repopulated with Poles including Poles expelled from the Kresy regions. This, along with other similar migrations in Central and Eastern Europe, combined to form one of the largest human migrations in modern times. Stalin ordered Polish resistance fighters to be either incarcerated or deported to gulags in Siberia.

At the time of Yalta over 200,000 troops of the Polish Armed Forces in the West were serving under Allied command. Many of these men and women were originally from the Kresy region of eastern Poland including cities such as Lwów and Wilno. They had been deported from Kresy to the Soviet gulags when Hitler and Stalin occupied Poland in 1939 in accordance with the Nazi–Soviet Pact. Two years later, when Churchill and Stalin formed an alliance against Hitler, the Kresy Poles were released from the Gulags in Siberia, formed the Anders Army, and marched to Iran to create the II Corps. The corps fought in the North African and Italian campaigns, and hoped to return to Kresy in an independent and democratic Poland at the end of the War. However, at Yalta the borders agreed in Tehran in 1943 were finalized, meaning that Stalin would keep the Soviet gains Hitler agreed to in the Nazi–Soviet Pact, including Kresy; he planned to continue carrying out Polish population transfers in the region. These transfers included the land Poland gained at Tehran in the West at the expense of Germany. Consequently, at Yalta, it was agreed that Kresy would fall in the Soviet sphere of influence. In reaction, 30 officers and men from the II Corps committed suicide.

Churchill defended his actions in a three-day Parliamentary debate starting 27 February 1945, which ended in a vote of confidence. During the debate, many MPs openly criticised Churchill, passionately defended Polish opposition to Soviet domination and expressed deep reservations about Yalta. Moreover, 25 of these MPs drafted an amendment protesting against Churchill's tacit acceptance of Poland's domination by the Soviet Union. These members included Arthur Greenwood, Alec Douglas-Home, Commander Archibald Southby, the Lord Willoughby de Eresby, and Victor Raikes. After the failure of the amendment, Henry Strauss, the Member of Parliament for Norwich, resigned his seat in protest over Churchill's treatment of Poland.

Before the Second World War ended, the Soviets installed a pro-Soviet regime. Although President Roosevelt "insisted on free and unfettered" elections in Poland, Vyacheslav Molotov instead managed to deliver an election fair by "Soviet standards." As many as half a million Polish soldiers refused to return to Poland, because of the Soviet repressions of Polish citizens, the Trial of the Sixteen, and other executions of pro-democracy Poles, particularly the so-called cursed soldiers, former members of the Armia Krajowa. The result was the Polish Resettlement Act 1947, Britain's first mass immigration law.

Yalta was used by ruling communists to underline anti-Western sentiment in Poland. It was easy to argue that Poland was not very important to the West, since Allied leaders sacrificed Polish borders, legal government, and free elections for future peace between the Allies and the Soviet Union.

On the other hand, some authors have pointed out that Yalta allowed the Polish communists to win over Polish nationalists by allowing them to realize their goal to annex and resettle formerly German land.

The Federal Republic of Germany (West Germany), formed in 1949, was portrayed by Communist propaganda as the breeder of Hitler's posthumous offspring who desired retaliation and wanted to take back from Poland the "Recovered Territories" that had been home of more than 8 million Germans. Giving this picture a grain of credibility was that West Germany until 1970 refused to recognize the Oder-Neisse Line as the German-Polish border, and that some West German officials had a tainted Nazi past. For a segment of Polish public opinion, Communist rule was seen as the lesser of the two evils.

Defenders of the actions taken by the Western allies maintain that Realpolitik made it impossible to do anything else, and that they were in no shape to start an utterly un-winnable war with the Soviet Union over the subjugation of Poland and other Central and Eastern European countries immediately after the end of World War II. It could be contended that the presence of a double standard with respect to Nazi and Soviet aggression existed in 1940, when the Soviet Union absorbed the Baltic States and then attacked Finland, and yet the Western Allies chose not to intervene in those theatres.

The chief American negotiator at Yalta was Alger Hiss, later accused of being a Soviet spy and convicted of perjuring himself in his testimony to the House Committee on Unamerican Activities. This accusation was later corroborated by the Venona tapes. In 2001, James Barron, a staff reporter for The New York Times, identified what he called a "growing consensus that Hiss, indeed, had most likely been a Soviet agent."

At the war's end many of these feelings of resentment were capitalised on by the occupying Soviets, who used them to reinforce anti-Western sentiments within Poland. Propaganda was produced by Communists to show the Soviet Union as the Great Liberator, and the West as the Great Traitor. For instance, Moscow's Pravda reported in February 1944 that all Poles who valued Poland's honour and independence were marching with the "Union of Polish Patriots" in the USSR.

=== Aborted Yalta agreement enforcement plans ===
At some point in the spring of 1945, Churchill commissioned a contingency military enforcement operation plan (war on the Soviet Union) to obtain a "square deal for Poland" (Operation Unthinkable), which resulted in a May 22 report stating unfavorable success odds. The report's arguments included geostrategic issues (possible Soviet-Japanese alliance resulting in moving of Japanese troops from continent to Home Islands, threat to Iran and Iraq) and uncertainties concerning land battles in Europe.

== Bulgaria, Greece, Hungary, Romania and Yugoslavia ==
During the Fourth Moscow Conference in 1944, Soviet premier Joseph Stalin and British prime minister Winston Churchill discussed how to divide various European countries into spheres of influence. Churchill's account of the incident is that Churchill suggested that the Soviet Union should have 90 percent influence in Romania and 75 percent in Bulgaria; the United Kingdom should have 90 percent in Greece; with a 50–50 share in Hungary and Yugoslavia. The two foreign ministers, Anthony Eden and Vyacheslav Molotov, negotiated about the percentage shares on October 10 and 11. The result of these discussions was that the percentages of Soviet influence in Bulgaria and, more significantly, Hungary were amended to 80 percent.

== See also ==
- Bitter Legacy – 1982 book on Polish-American relations by Richard C. Lukas
- Eastern European anti-Communist insurgencies
- Non-intervention in the Spanish Civil War – Foreign policy to deter interference in Spanish Civil War
- Repatriation of Soviet citizens after World War II – Population transfer program by Allies of World War II
  - Operation Keelhaul – 1946–1947 forced repatriation of Soviet military collaborators
  - Repatriation of Cossacks after World War II – Repatriation of anti-Soviet Cossack collaborators to the Soviet Union
- Perfidious Albion – Pejorative epithet for Great Britain
- Polish Resettlement Corps – Organisation formed by the British Government in 1946
- Polish resistance movement in World War II
- Soviet repressions against former prisoners of war – WW2 persecution of returning Soviet POWs
- Swedish extradition of Baltic soldiers – 1945–1946 extradition of Latvian, Estonian and Lithuanian soldiers to USSR
- Vin americanii! – The slogan "The Americans are coming" expressed the Romanian expectation for an American intervention against the Soviet occupation
- Why Die for Danzig? – French anti-war slogan
- World War II Behind Closed Doors: Stalin, the Nazis and the West – 2008 documentary television series

== General sources ==
- Nicholas Bethell, The War Hitler Won: The Fall of Poland, September 1939, New York, 1972.
- Mieczyslaw B. Biskupski The History of Poland. Westport, CT; London: Greenwood Press, 2000.
- Christopher Booker (1997). A Looking-Glass Tragedy: The Controversy Over the Repatriations from Austria in 1945. Duckworth. ISBN 9780715627389.
- Russell D. Buhite Decisions at Yalta: an appraisal of summit diplomacy, Wilmington, DE: Scholarly Resources Inc, 1986.
- Anna M. Cienciala "Poland in British and French policy in 1939: determination to fight — or avoid war?" pages 413–433 from The Origins of The Second World War edited by Patrick Finney, Arnold, London, 1997.
- Anna M. Cienciala and Titus Komarnicki From Versailles to Locarno: keys to Polish foreign policy, 1919–25, Lawrence, KS: University Press of Kansas, 1984.
- Richard Crampton Eastern Europe in the Twentieth Century — and After. London; New York: Routledge, 1997.
- Norman Davies, Rising '44: The Battle for Warsaw. Viking Books, 2004. ISBN 0-670-03284-0.
- Norman Davies, God's Playground ISBN 0-231-05353-3 and ISBN 0-231-05351-7 (two volumes).
- David Dutton Neville Chamberlain, London: Arnold; New York: Oxford University Press, 2001.
- Sean Greenwood "The Phantom Crisis: Danzig, 1939" pages 247–272 from The Origins of the Second World War Reconsidered: A. J. P. Taylor and the Historians edited by Gordon Martel Routledge Inc, London, United Kingdom, 1999.
- Daniel Johnson, "Betrayed by the Big Three". Daily Telegraph, London, November 8, 2003
- Robert Kee, Munich: The Eleventh Hour, London: Hamilton, 1988.
- Diana Kuprel, "How the Allies Betrayed Warsaw". The Globe and Mail, Toronto, February 7, 2004
- Arthur Bliss Lane, I Saw Poland Betrayed: An American Ambassador Reports to the American People. The Bobbs-Merrill Company, Indianapolis, 1948. ISBN 1-125-47550-1.
- Igor Lukes & Erik Goldstein (ed.) The Munich Crisis, 1938: Prelude to World War II, London; Portland, OR: Frank Cass Inc, 1999.
- Margaret Olwen Macmillan Paris 1919: Six Months That Changed the World. New York: Random House, 2003, 2002, 2001.
- David Martin, Ally Betrayed. Prentice-Hall, New York, 1946.
- David Martin, Patriot or Traitor: The Case of General Mihailovich. Hoover Institution, Stanford, California, 1978. ISBN 0-8179-6911-X.
- David Martin, The Web of Disinformation: Churchill's Yugoslav Blunder. Harcourt, Brace, Jovanovich, San Diego & New York, 1990. ISBN 0-15-180704-3
- Lynne Olson, Stanley Cloud, A Question of Honor: The Kosciuszko Squadron: Forgotten Heroes of World War II. Knopf, 2003. ISBN 0-375-41197-6.
- Anita Prażmowska, Poland: The Betrayed Ally. Cambridge University Press, Cambridge, 1995. ISBN 0-521-48385-9.
- Henry L. Roberts "The Diplomacy of Colonel Beck" pages 579–614 from The Diplomats 1919–1939 edited by Gordon A. Craig & Felix Gilbert, Princeton University Press: Princeton, New Jersey, USA, 1953.
- Edward Rozek, Allied Wartime Diplomacy: A Pattern in Poland, New York, 1958, reprint Boulder, CO, 1989.
- Ari Shaltiel, "The Great Betrayal". Haaretz, Tel Aviv, February 23, 2004
- Wacław Stachiewicz (1998). Wierności dochować żołnierskiej. Rytm, Warsaw. ISBN 83-86678-71-2.
- Piotr Stefan Wandycz The twilight of French eastern alliances, 1926–1936: French-Czechoslovak-Polish relations from Locarno to the remilitarisation of the Rhineland, Princeton, NJ: Princeton University Press, 1988.
- Piotr Wandycz France and her eastern allies, 1919–1925: French-Czechoslovak-Polish relations from the Paris Peace Conference to Locarno, Minneapolis: University of Minnesota Press, 1962.
- Gerhard Weinberg A world at arms: a global history of World War II, Cambridge, United Kingdom; New York: Cambridge University Press, 1994.
- John Wheeler-Bennett Munich: Prologue to Tragedy, New York: Duell, Sloan and Pearce, 1948.
- Robert Young France and the origins of the Second World War, New York: St. Martin's Press, 1996.
- Paul E. Zinner "Czechoslovakia: The Diplomacy of Eduard Benes". In Gordon A. Craig & Felix Gilbert (ed.). The Diplomats 1919–1939. Princeton, NJ: Princeton University Press, 1953. pp. 100–122.
- Piotr Zychowicz, Pakt Ribbentrop - Beck. Dom Wydawniczy Rebis, Poznań 2012. ISBN 978-83-7510-921-4
- Republic of Poland, The Polish White Book: Official Documents concerning Polish-German and Polish-Soviet Relations 1933–1939; Ministry for Foreign Affairs of the Republic of Poland, New York, 1940.
