= Nazi birthing centres for foreign workers =

Neglectful children's homes in Nazi Germany

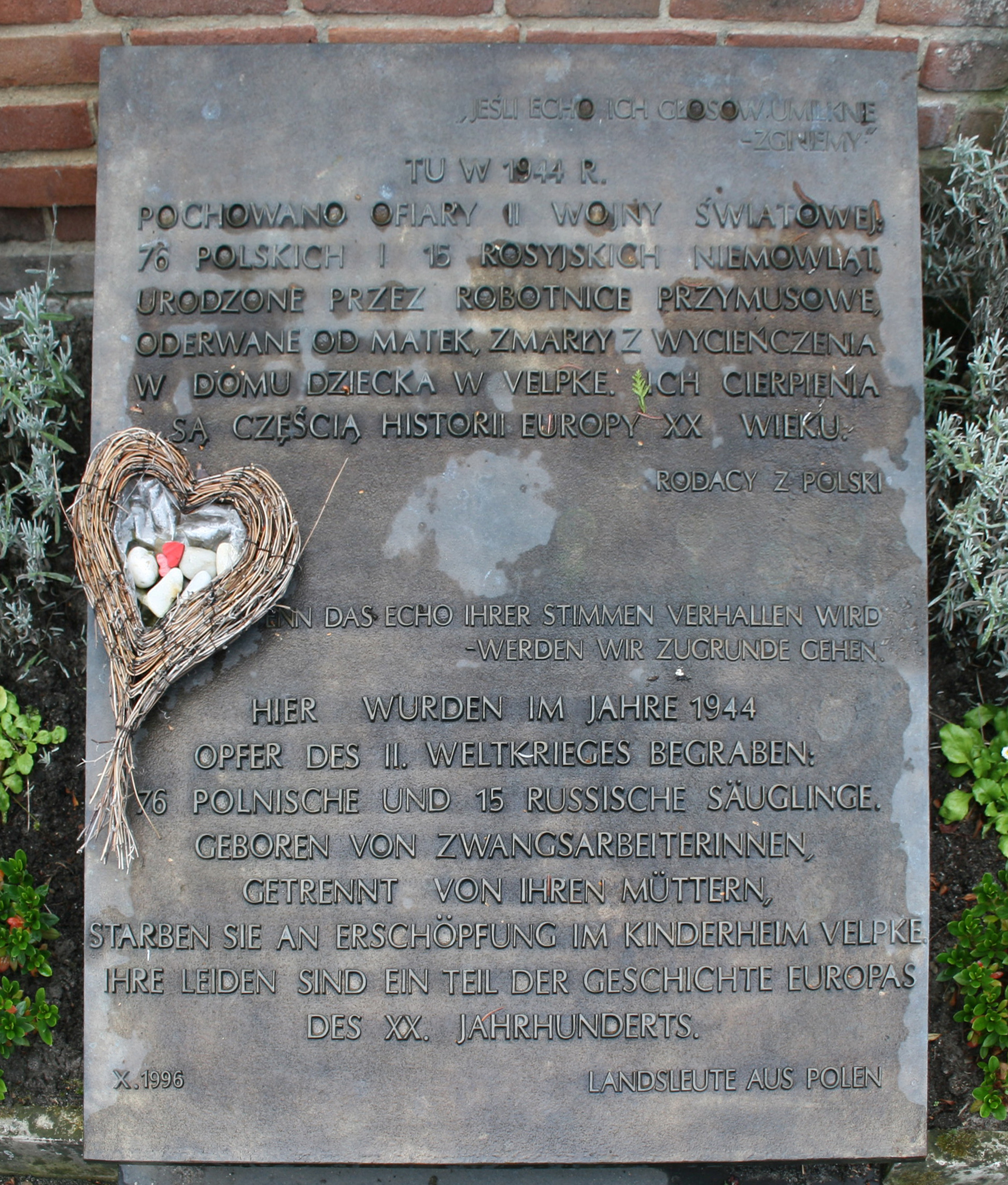
- Commemorative plaque at the entrance to the former NSDAP home in Velpke where 76 Polish and 15 Soviet babies were killed by starvation in 1944

During World War II, Nazi birthing centres for foreign workers, known in German as Ausländerkinder-Pflegestätte (literally "foreign children nurseries"), Ostarbeiterkinderpflegestätten ("eastern worker children nurseries"), or Säuglingsheim ("baby home") were German institutions used as stations for abandoned infants, Nazi Party facilities established in the heartland of Nazi Germany for the so-called 'troublesome' babies according to Himmler's decree, the offspring born to foreign women and girls servicing the German war economy, including Polish and Eastern European female forced labour. The babies and children, most of them resulting from rape at the place of enslavement, were abducted en masse between 1943 and 1945. At some locations, up to 90% of infants died a torturous death due to calculated neglect (see also Nazi crimes against children.).

== Nazi policy ==
Among the Polish and Soviet female forced labour (German: Zivil- und Ostarbeiter) unintended pregnancies were common due to rampant sexual abuse by their overseers. A staggering 80% of rapes resulting in unwanted births occurred on the farms where the Polish girls worked. The SS suspected the victims of "cheating their way out of work" by conceiving. Notably, the babies born inside concentration camps were not released into the communities. For example, of the 3,000 babies born at Auschwitz, some 2,500 newborns were drowned in a barrel at the maternity ward by the German female overseers. Meanwhile, by the spring of 1942 the arrival of trains with the girls from Poland turned into slave markets in German towns and villages, as in Braunschweig among other locations, where the young women were beaten, starved, and prohibited from speaking to each other.

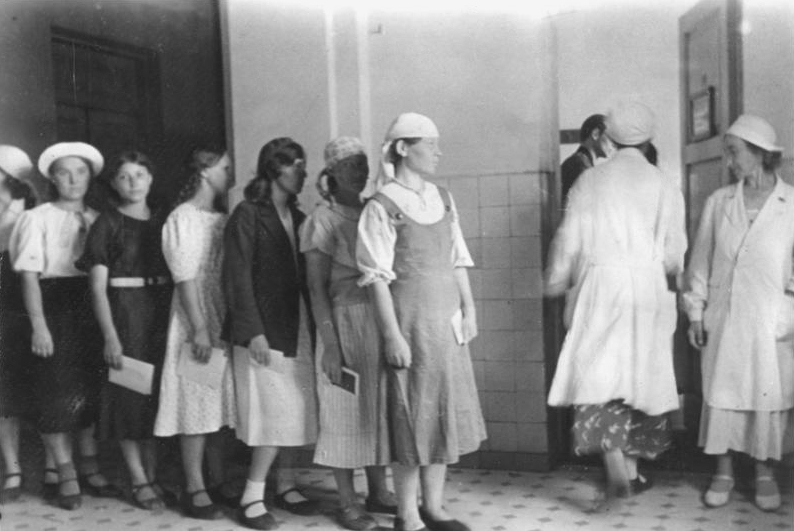
Medical checkup before departure to unknown German slave markets; already pregnant foreigners were not allowed entry into Germany.

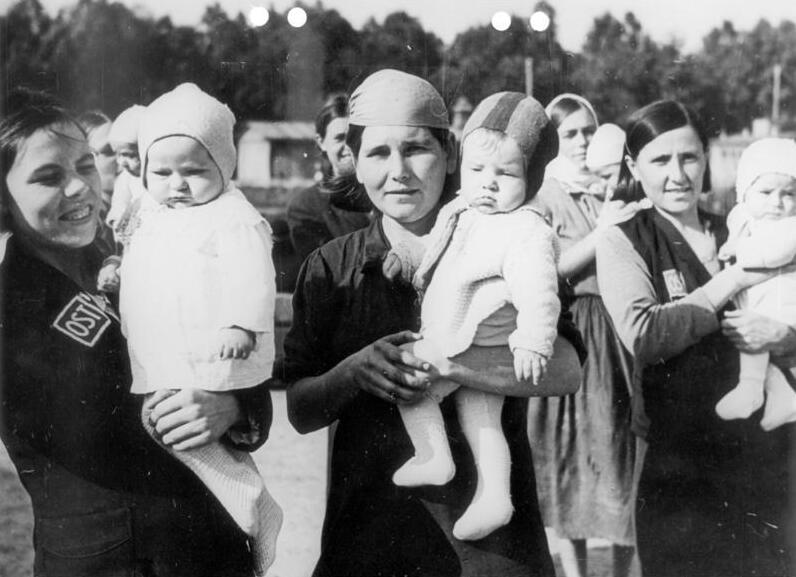
Preoccupied with their new babies, foreign labourers could no longer work for the benefit of the Nazis.

Abortion in Germany was illegal as far as German women were concerned, thus the law had to be altered. On 11 March 1943, the Reichsführer-SS signed a decree allowing for abortions "requested" by the young Zivil- und Ostarbeiter. Pregnant slave workers, who were forced to abort by the Germans, had to sign printed requests before surgery and were threatened with prison time and death by starvation. Abortions were enforced after determining whether the probable father was a German or otherwise Germanic in origin. Children were either born in, or brought into any one of the estimated 400 Ausländerkind-Pflegestätte homes as "parentless". When "racially valuable", they were removed for Germanisation. In the event a foreign female worker was considered to be of Germanic blood, her child was kept alive, but this was rare.

The mortality of the Zivil- und Ostarbeiter babies was very high on average, exceeding 50% regardless of circumstances. It is estimated that between 1943 and 1945 some 100,000 infants of slave labourers from Poland and the Soviet Union were killed by forced abortion or by calculated neglect after birth in Germany. By other estimates, up to 200,000 children might have died. A German general and NSDAP government official, Erich Hilgenfeldt, while inspecting some of those locations was troubled by what he saw. He reported that the children were dying in an unnecessarily slow, torturous process lasting for months, due to inadequate food rations:

I consider the manner, in which this matter is treated at present, as impossible. There is only one way or another. Either we have no desire to keep these children alive – therefore we should not allow them to slowly starve to death and [at the same time] swindle so many litres of valuable milk from the general food supply. Or [presumably] we intend to raise these children in order to utilize them later on, as labor. In this case they must be fed in such a manner that they will be usable as workers.

— Erich Hilgenfeldt

At the Waltrop-Holthausen birth and abortion camp, 1,273 infants were purposely left to die in the so-called baby-hut and then simply checked off as stillborn. Historians believe that it was Himmler himself who intentionally gave these "assembly stations", a pompous name of the nursing homes for the non-German children, while planning their mass murder known euphemistically as "the special treatment" (Sonderbehandlung). The immediate reason for the local Gestapo to insist on setting up so many of these institutions was that pregnant German women absolutely refused to enter the facilities where the Ostarbeiter women were taken. According to the last decree of Reichsführer-SS in this matter, signed on 27 July 1943, foreign mothers who were unable to get back to work after giving birth were to be exterminated along with their babies.

The killing wards for the Zivil- und Ostarbeiter children, including their intentionally misdiagnosed mothers (usually as being "mentally ill"), were established at the Bavarian state hospital at Kaufbeuren and its branch at Irsee. They continued to function as euthanasia centres for 33 days after the end of the war until discovery by American troops on 29 May 1945.

== Selected locations of Ausländerkinder-Pflegestätten and cemeteries ==
- Braunschweig, Entbindungsheim für Ostarbeiterinnen, over 360 babies buried.
- Velpke trial, two death sentences for the killing of Polish children.
- Dresden, Dr.-Todt-Straße 120 (Radeburger Straße 12a), Auslandskinderpflegestätte, with 40% of children confirmed as killed.
- Propagandaaufnahme (February 1944). Sanitized German Nazi propaganda photo (Children at an Ostarbeiterlager). Nazi Germany, location withheld: Bundesarchiv.de collections.
- Spital am Pyhrn (Austria): Here existed the first such birthing centre in the whole German Reich, at least 49 children died due to undersupply and neglect.

== See also ==
- Kidnapping of children by Nazi Germany
- Kinder KZ adjacent to Litzmannstadt Ghetto
- Ethnic cleansing of Zamojszczyzna by Nazi Germany
- Heuaktion
- Jugendamt
- RuSHA trial
- Nazi crimes against the Polish nation
