= The Strange Allies =

1978 book on Polish-American WWII relations by Richard C. Lukas

The Strange Allies: Poland and the United States, 1941-1945
- Title page for The Strange Allies: Poland and the United States, 1941-1945 (1978)
- Author: Richard C. Lukas
- Language: English
- Subject: the relationship between the United States and the Polish government-in-exile during World War II
- Publisher: University of Tennessee Press
- Publication date: 1978
- Publication place: United States
- Pages: 230
- ISBN: 978-0870492297

The Strange Allies: Poland and the United States, 1941-1945 is a 1978 book by Richard C. Lukas, published by University of Tennessee Press. It deals with the relationship between the United States and the Polish government-in-exile during World War II and highlighted the impact of American Polonia in United States-Polish relations.

Lukas continued this topic with Bitter Legacy: Polish-American Relations in the Wake of World War II (1982), described by one reviewer as a "sequel" to The Strange Allies. Bitter Legacy deals with postwar Polish history and Polish-American relations, as well as the aid that was extended to Poland after World War II.
