= Eagles East =

1970 book on USAF and USSR during WWII by Richard C. Lukas

Eagles East: The Army Air Forces and the Soviet Union, 1941–1945
- Author: Richard C. Lukas
- Language: English
- Subject: the World War II relations between the United States Army Air Forces and the USSR
- Publisher: Florida State University Press
- Publication date: 1970
- Publication place: United States
- Pages: 256
- ISBN: 978-0813004280

Eagles East: The Army Air Forces and the Soviet Union, 1941–1945 is a 1970 book by Richard C. Lukas. Published by Florida State University Press, it is a military-diplomatic study focusing on the World War II relations between the United States Army Air Forces and the USSR.

Based on Lukas's doctoral dissertation, this book earned him the national history award of the American Institute of Aeronautics and Astronautics.

R. S. Hughes commended the book for its "extensive and detailed coverage of Allied-Soviet relations during World War II", and noted that it is particularly helpful for its discussion of the Lend-Lease program. Raymond L. Garthoff writes that it is a "useful study" and "recommended reading" for those interested in the political-military history of USA-USSR relations during World War II with regard to interactions between the U.S. Army Air Forces and the USSR.

James J. Hudson calls the book "an excellent example of military-diplomatic history". Sam Frank, in his review, writes that the book "reflects extensive research and effective writing. An excellent balance has been achieved between factual presentation and interpretation."

== See also ==
- Operation Frantic
