= Bitter Legacy =

1982 book on Polish-American relations by Richard C. Lukas

Bitter Legacy: Polish-American Relations in the Wake of World War II
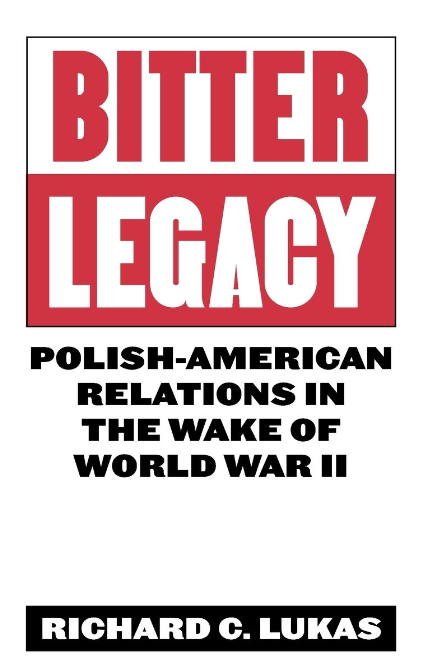
- Author: Richard C. Lukas
- Language: English
- Subject: the postwar Polish history and Polish-American relations, as well as the American aid that was extended to Poland after World War II
- Publisher: University Press of Kentucky
- Publication date: 1982
- Publication place: United States
- Pages: 191
- ISBN: 978-0813114606

Bitter Legacy: Polish-American Relations in the Wake of World War II is a 1982 book by Richard C. Lukas, published by the University Press of Kentucky. It deals with the postwar Polish history and Polish-American relations, as well as the American aid that was extended to Poland after World War II.

The book focuses on the postwar period (1945-1947) and describes how during that America steadily lost influence over Poland because of a combination of external factors and as internal American policy decisions, such as prioritizing German-American relations over Polish-American ones.

== Contents ==
The book continues the topic Lukas begun discussing in his earlier book, The Strange Allies: Poland and the United States, 1941-1945 (1978), with most reviewers describing Bitter Legacy as a "sequel" to The Strange Allies.

The work discusses American government views and actions towards Poland from the 1945 Potsdam conference through the fraudulent Polish parliamentary election of 1947. Lukas attempts to explain "why United States policy was unable to reverse the process begun at the Yalta Conference that transformed Poland into a Soviet satellite". According to Lukas this was because Poland "had been written off as a Soviet sphere of influence by the Roosevelt administration" and during the subsequent Truman administration, the US government was focused on other issues (such as the economic recovery of Western Europe and strengthening American control over Germany and Italy).

The book discusses individuals such as Truman's Secretaries of State James Byrnes and George C. Marshall or ambassadors Arthur Bliss Lane and Stanton Griffis. Lukas describes the American policy towards Poland of that time as incoherent and "disastrous because it failed to take advantage of those clauses of the Yalta Agreement that supported Poland's claims and its democracy." That was because American government had already "dissociated itself from Poland and Eastern Europe at Yalta," as Truman was not interested in any serious negotiations regarding Soviet concessions regarding Poland and hoped that pure economic support (through United Nations Relief and Rehabilitation Administration and similar initiatives) would suffice to secure parliamentary victory for parties sympathetic to the US (Stanisław Mikołajczyk and his Polish People's Party).

Lukas points out that Secretary of State Byrnes's Stuttgart speech on rebuilding Germany (Restatement of Policy on Germany in September 1946) was deeply problematic for the Polish-American relations. Byrnes in his speech criticized the post-war Polish-German border (the Oder-Neisse line), which was then used by Polish communists, who could point to the speech to justify their claims that the Soviet Union, not the United States, was the best friend of Poland. That was a prominent example, according to Lukas, of American policy that counterproductively worsened the Polish-American relations, something that the US government either did not foresee or did not care about, likely because it had accepted that improving German-American relationship was more important and more realistic than trying to retain some influence in Poland.

Lukas is also critical of American ambassador to Poland, Arthur Bliss Lane, suggesting that he was not "imaginative and flexible enough" for that difficult job.

Lukas also positively reviews the actions of Polish American Congress and American Polonia with regards to their anti-communist attitude although he notes that overall the Polonia failed to significantly influence American government policy towards Poland. Polonia's disappointment with Democrats under Truman impacted the domestic American politics from "an enlarged Polish vote for the Republicans in [November] 1946, helping them to gain control of Congress".

== Reception ==
The book received several academic reviews in 1983.

Mieczysław B. Biskupski reviewed the book for The Russian Review. He noted that both books in the series exhibit "the author's thorough and enterprising use of sources, conciseness of style, and dispassionate analysis". Biskupski acknowledges that there are "a number of minor flaws in this otherwise fine book" but concludes that "Lukas has produced a brief, tightly-focused account of the first years of post-war American-Polish relations" that "fills a considerable gap" in relevant literature.

J. M. Jackson wrote about the book for the International Affairs. Jackson writes that the book is "an adequate account of the course of postwar relations" between Poland and the US, and the factors influencing American policies. He also notes that the book attempts to speculate on "whether different policies on the part of the United States could have made any significant difference" to the course of history and the Cold War; something that Lukas thinks might have been possible, but Jackson feels is "more doubtful".

George J. Lerski reviewing the book for The American Historical Review called it a professional monography in the field of Polish-American relations and an "important and well-documented study" praising the author for "his impeccable research in primary and secondary sources". He notes that there are occasional minor errors in the work (in particular, "insufficient familiarity with the Polish political spectrum"), or places he would have "disagreements... of a minor character", and concludes that "this is an important contribution toward a better understanding of post-war events in that terra incognita of American historiography".

Eduard Mark reviewed it for The Journal of but History. He noted that the book has "considerable merit" and that the author "writes clearly, and his narrative is easily followed," although he writes that Lukas work would benefit more from engaging with literature on Soviet policy (in particular, Vojtech Mastny's), which Mark thought led Lukas to overestimate what the United States might have achieved had it tried harder to retain some control over Poland in its sphere of influence. Mark notes that Lukas important contribution is that he successfully demonstrates how Poland's importance continued to wane throughout the war and afterwar years for American policymakers.

David S. Mason reviewed the book for the Slavic Review. Mason's assessment was that "while the book adds little to our understanding of Poland's role in the development of the Cold War, it presents a thorough overview of the period written in a lively and engaging style and illustrated with delightful anecdotes".

== See also ==
- Western betrayal
