= List of monuments to Soviet children in World War II =

There is a large number of monuments to Soviet children that suffered and worked during the Great Patriotic War and to the children prisoners of concentration camps, erected in Russia and some other post-Soviet states.

== Monuments to children of war ==
- "To the Children of War" Memorial (Мемориальный комплекс "Детям войны"), Chita, Russia, inaugurated September 19, 2025
- Children of War Monument (Glukhiv), Ukraine
- Children of War Monument (Krasnoyarsk), Russia
- Children of War Monument (Orenburg), Russia
- Children of War Monument (Rostov-on-Don), Russia
- Children of War Monument (Rtishchevo), Russia
- Children of War Monument (Saint Petersburg), Russia
- Children of War Monument (Vitebsk), Belarus
  Inaugurated in 2011, the monument depicts a boy with a little girl on his lap sitting on the steps of demolished house. The author is Valery Mahuchy.
- Monument to children victims of the Great Patriotic War, Krasny Berah, Zhlobin district, Belarus
- Monument to the Children of War Who Died in 1941–1945, Simferopol, Ukraine
- Children of Peace to Children of War, Mogilev, Belarus
- Monument to the Children of War "Swing", Stary Oskol, Russia

The composition shows a boy swinging on a swing tied to the barrel of a mangled cannon and a girl standing beside. 51.313485°N 37.882951°E

- Monument to Children – Forced Blood Donors, Makiivka, Ukraine
  The memorial is installed in 2005, at the place of the burial of children from the local orphanage, from which the Germans drew blood. The composition consists of three steles made of black granite. At the top part of the middle stele are two small angels holding a Christian cross and at its bottom there are two roses wound with barbed wire.
- Dedicated to Tanya Savicheva and the Children of War, Shakhty, Russia
  Inaugurated in 2010, the memorial refers to Tanya Savicheva, a teenage girl who kept a diary during the Siege of Leningrad.

== Monuments to home front workers and children of war ==
- Monument to home front workers and children of war (Chistopol)
- Monument to home front workers and children of war (Kotlas)
- Monument to home front workers and children of war (Mendeleyevsk)
- Monument to home front workers and children of war (Nizhnekamsk)
- Monument to home front workers and children of war (Oktyabrsky)
- Monument to home front workers and children of war (Tomsk)
- Monument to home front workers and children of war (Ulan-Ude)

== See also ==
- ru:Категория:Памятники детям, includes more monuments to Soviet World War II children
- Nazi crimes against children
