= Rena Rolska =

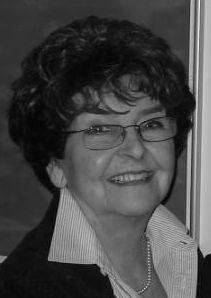
- Rolska in 2008

Background information
- Born: Regina Rollinger; 19 January 1932; Warsaw, Poland
- Died: 27 August 2024 (aged 92)
- Genres: Traditional pop
- Occupations: Singer; dancer; actress
- Years active: 1955–1981
- Spouse: Marian Jonkajtys

Regina Rollinger-Jonkajtys (née Rollinger; 19 January 1932 – 27 August 2024), better known by her stage name Rena Rolska, was a Polish singer, dancer and actress.

== Biography ==
Regina Rollinger was born and grew up in Warsaw. She studied opera singing with professor Jadwiga Reiss. She debuted in 1955 at the Guardian Hall (now Mirów's Halls) as a dancer with the Polish Radio Dance Orchestra. Between 1956 and 1960 she performed in the cabarette Pineska.

In 1961 Rolska performed at the Sopot International Song Festival with Marek Sart's composition Piosenka prawdę ci powie (The song will tell you the truth). Rena Rolska took part in the National Festival of Polish Song in Opole in 1963 and many times after that. In the years 1971–1978 she acted at the Syrena Theatre in Warsaw.

During her career in show business (1955–1981) Rolska recorded 12 albums and performed in many countries, including the Soviet Union, the United States, Canada, Mongolia and Belgium.

Rolska was married to Polish actor Marian Jonkajtys. She died on 27 August 2024, at the age of 92.
