= Nazi crimes against children =

Nazi German persecution and war crimes against children

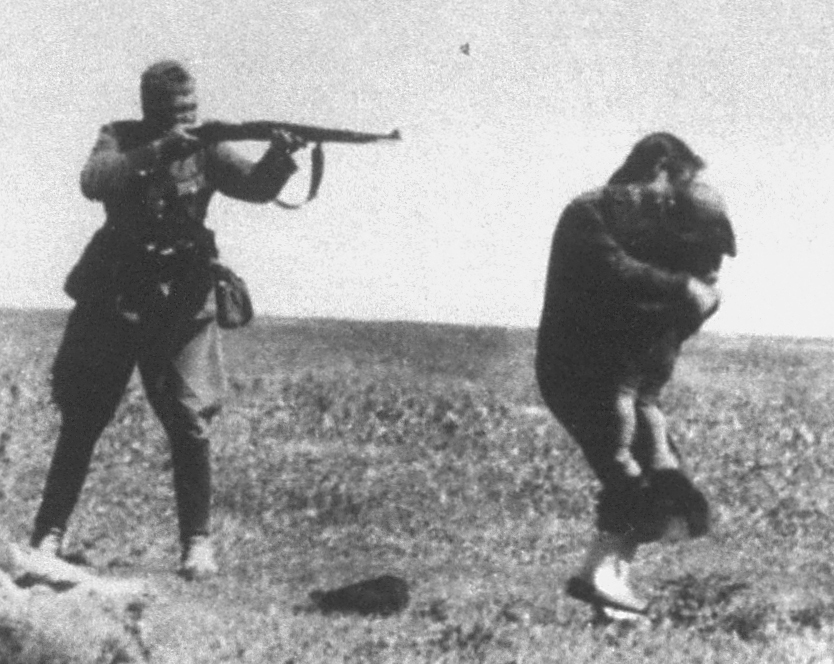
Cropped "Ivanhorod Einsatzgruppen photograph", portraying a policeman of the German Ordnungspolizei aiming his rifle at a woman who is trying to shield a child with her body

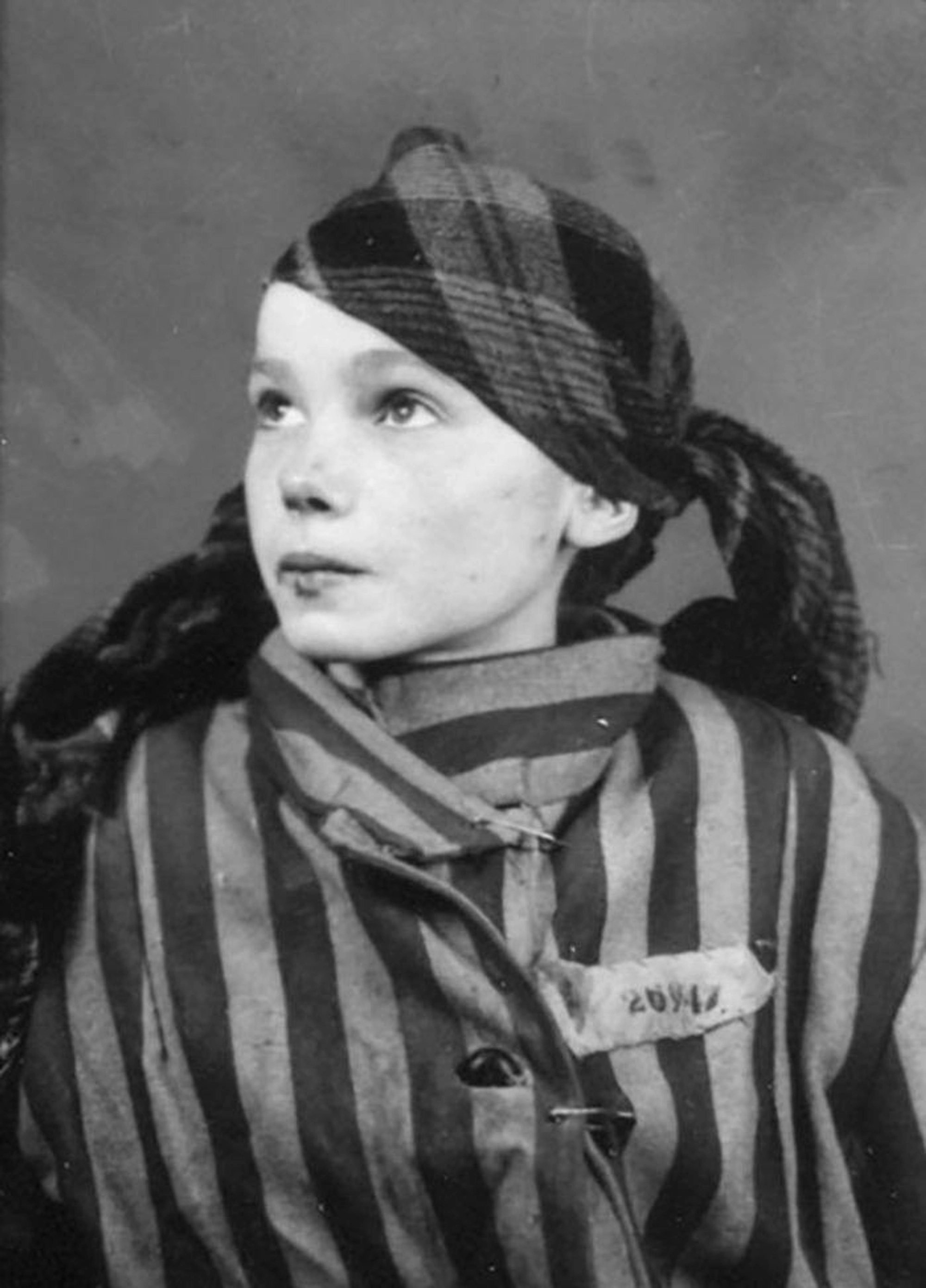
Czesława Kwoka, 14-year-old Auschwitz concentration camp victim

Nazi Germany perpetrated various crimes against humanity and war crimes against children, including the killing of children of unwanted or "dangerous" people in accordance with Nazi ideological views, either as part of their idea of racial struggle or as a measure of preventive security. They particularly targeted Jewish children in the Holocaust, but also ethnically Polish children and Romani (also called Gypsy) children and children with mental or physical disabilities. Thousands of children died in Nazi concentration camps. The Nazis and their collaborators killed children for these ideological reasons and in retaliation for real or alleged partisan attacks.

It is estimated that during World War II Nazis killed 2 million Polish and Polish Jewish children in occupied Polish territories. 1.5 million Jewish children perished in the Holocaust; tens of thousands of Romani children died in the Romani Holocaust, between 5,000 and 25,000 disabled children were killed as part of the Nazi euthanasia program. 200,000 mostly ethnic Polish children were kidnapped for the purpose of forced Germanization. Others were subject to forced labor.

== Murder ==
=== Euthanasia ===
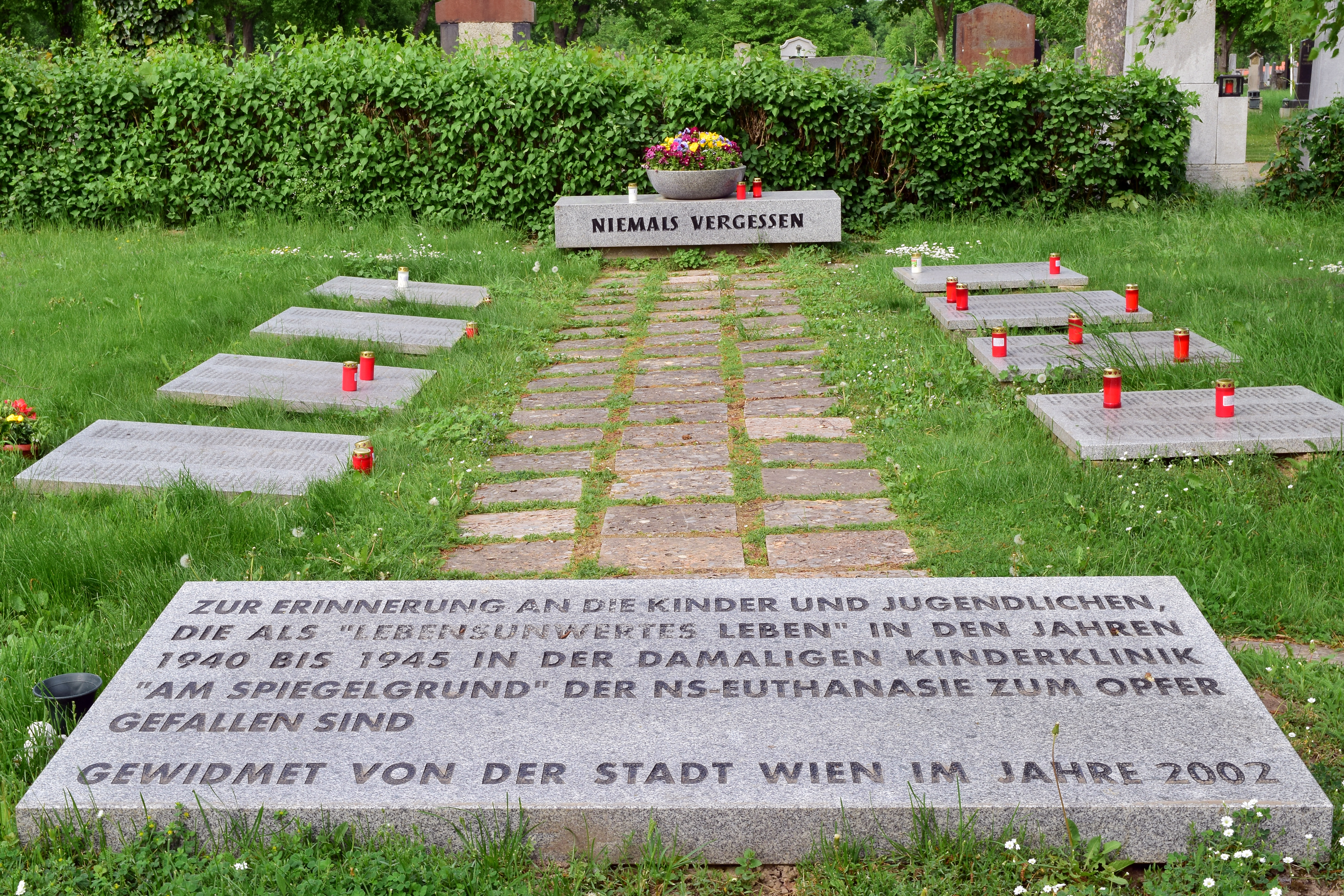
Grave-site memorial from the Am Spiegelgrund clinic in Vienna, where 789 child "patients" were murdered by the Nazis as part of the child euthanasia program.

Nazis established centers for child euthanasia (Kinderfachabteilung, lit. "pediatric specialty care units") in 1939 as part of their program to eliminate disabled people. Those centers were responsible for killings of thousands of children; others were sterilized. The number of children with disabilities that were exterminated by the Nazis is estimated to be between 5,000 and 25,000. Some of such children were subject to medical experiments before their death.

Sally M. Rogow noted that "it is a myth that only children with severe disabilities were killed", noting that Nazi victims also included children with minor disabilities. Non-conformist youth, such as the Edelweiss Pirates and Swing Youth, were also subject to forced institutionalization, including in concentration camps and psychiatric hospitals, and some were hanged.

In addition to the euthanasia for disabled children, Nazis also established, from 1942, "birthing centres" for "troublesome babies", based on Himmler's decree on foreign workers. Those centers, known in German as Ausländerkinder-Pflegestätte (literally "foreign children nurseries"), Ostarbeiterkinderpflegestätten ("eastern worker children nurseries"), or Säuglingsheim ("baby home"), were intended for abandoned infants, primarily the offspring born to foreign women and girls servicing the German war economy, including Polish and Eastern European female forced labour. The babies and children, most of them resulting from rape at the place of their forced labor (realistically, enslavement), were abducted from their mothers en masse between 1943 and 1945. At some locations, up to 90 percent of infants died a torturous death due to calculated neglect. For example, at the Waltrop-Holthausen camp, 1,273 infants were purposely left to die in the so-called baby-hut and then simply checked off as stillborn.

While many such crimes occurred in German territories, Nazis also murdered disabled children in territories they occupied, such as the Soviet Union.

=== Collective punishment ===
After the German invasion of Poland, Germans begun a campaign of mass repressions against the Poles. Already in fall of 1939, a number of massacres of Polish civilians were carried out, often in the form of collective punishment in retaliation for real or alleged acts of resistance. In a number of cases (ex. Tryszczyn massacre, Pomeranian massacre in Gdynia, Wawer massacre) victims included children (teenagers under 18, and sometimes children as young as 12). Various similar incidents occurred in Poland through the war (for example, in 1942 in the Stary Ciepielów and Rekówka massacre, Germans murdered over 30 people, half of them children, for the crime of hiding Jews; in 1943, Germans massacred many inhabitants of the Michniów village, including dozens of children; in 1944 Germans executed the Ulma family, including their seven young children, also for the crime of hiding Jews).

Large-scale collective punishment on civilians, including children, was not limited to Poland. Throughout the war Nazis committed similar crimes in other places:

- the 1941 Kragujevac massacre in Nazi-occupied Serbia – more than 2,500 victims, including over 250 high school students; fifteen of the victims were 12 years old
- the 1942 Lidice massacre in the Protectorate of Bohemia and Moravia (today, Czech Republic) – more than 300 victims, including over 80 children
- the 1942 Kortelisy massacre in Nazi-occupied Ukraine – about 3,000 victims, including children
- the 1943 Khatyn massacre in Nazi-occupied Belarus – 149 victims, including about 70 children
- the 1944 Distomo massacre in Nazi-occupied Greece – more than 200 victims, including over 40 children
- the 1944 Oradour-sur-Glane massacre in Nazi-occupied France, where 643 people, including many children, died.
- the 1944 Sant'Anna di Stazzema massacre in Italy (more than 500 victims, including about 130 children)
- the 1944 Lipa massacre in Nazi-occupied area of modern-day Croatia- 269 victims, including 121 children.

=== The Holocaust ===
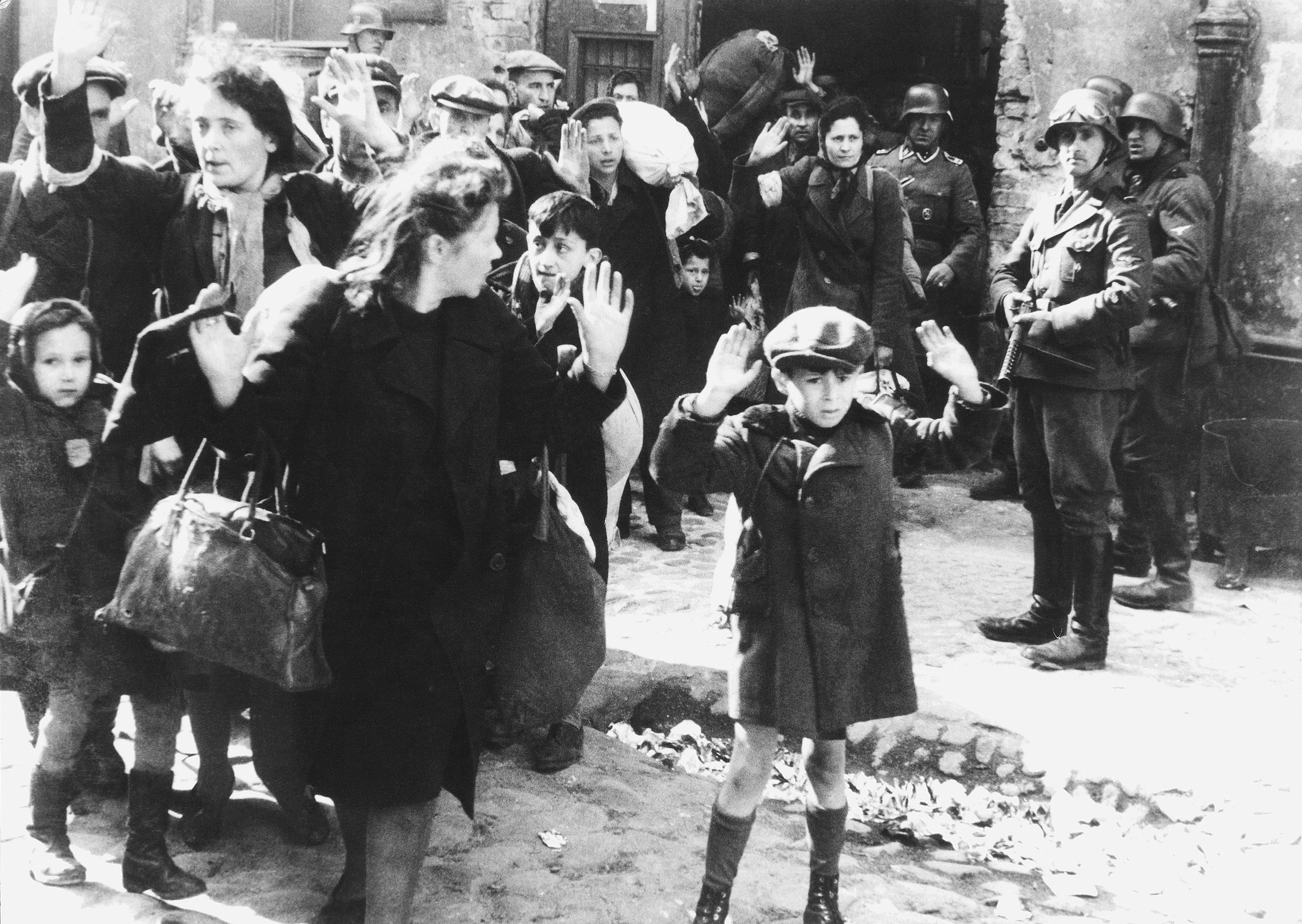
Warsaw Ghetto boy, a notable photograph representing children in the Holocaust

An estimated 1.5 million children, nearly all Jewish, were murdered during the Holocaust, either directly by or as a direct consequence of Nazi actions. This estimate includes children killed directly (for example, in executions) as well as victims of starvation and neglect in ghettos and concentration camps (see also Children of Bergen-Belsen). In the infamous Auschwitz concentration camp, of the approximately 230,000 children and young people deported to Auschwitz, more than 216,000 children, the majority, were of Jewish descent. No more than 650 of them survived until liberation. Likewise, tens of thousands of Romani (also called Gypsy) children perished in the Romani Holocaust.

=== Casualties ===
The total number of Polish children (including Polish Jewish child victims of the Holocaust) under the age of 16 who died in Poland is estimated at 1,800,000. Of these, historians believe 1,200,000 were Polish and 600,000 were Polish Jewish. Including children aged 16 to 18 raises the estimated losses to 2,025,000.

== Other crimes ==
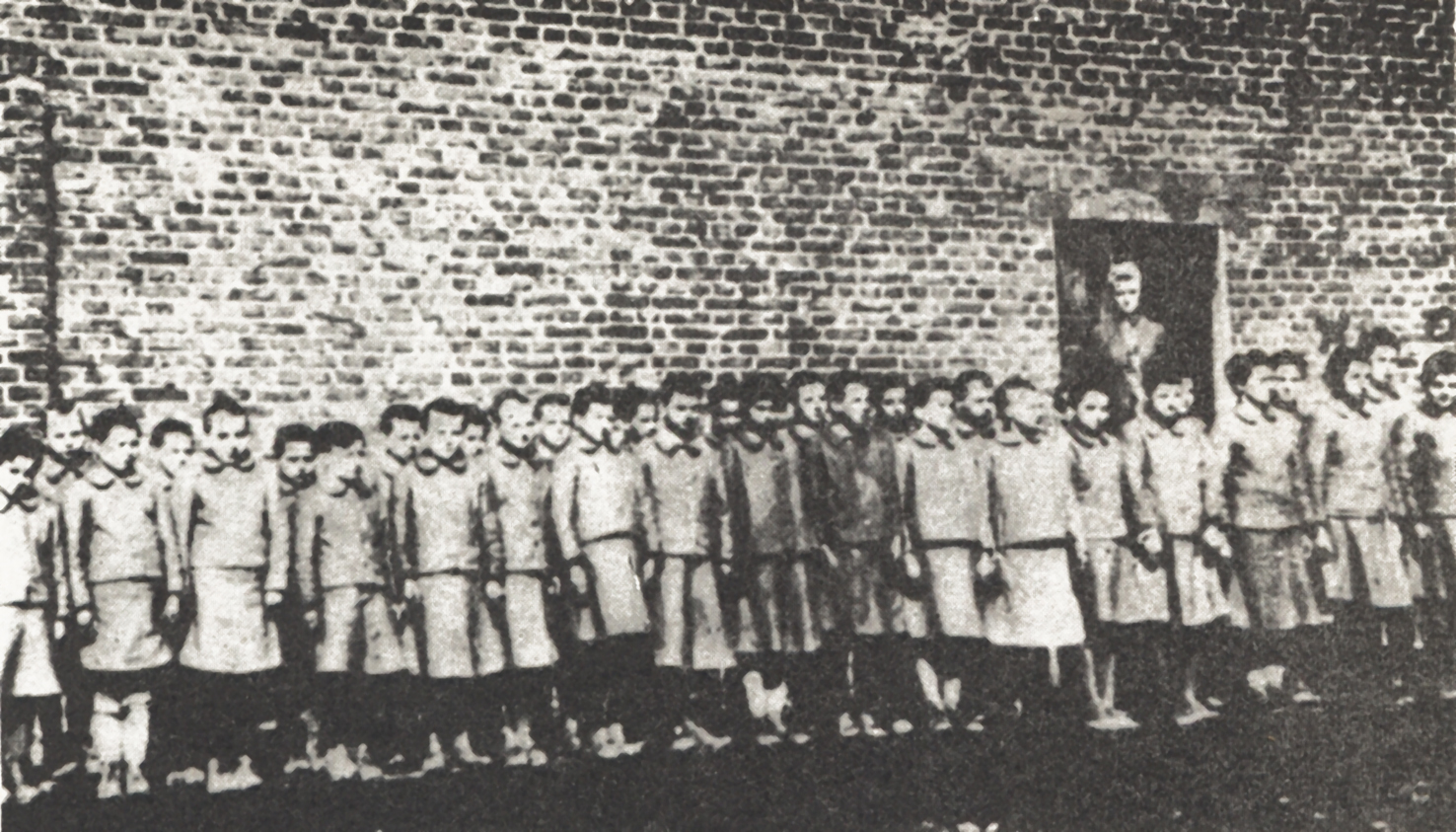
Polish girls in Nazi-German labor camp in Dzierżązna near Zgierz. Among the child prisoners were children kidnapped and resettled as part of the Operation Zamość (1942–1943)

During World War II, around 200,000 ethnic Polish children as well as an unknown number of children of other ethnicities were abducted from their homes and forcibly transported to Nazi Germany for purposes of forced labour, medical experimentation, or Germanization. Only a fifth of that number were recovered after the war. A significant aim of the project was to acquire and "Germanize" children believed to have Aryan/Nordic traits because Nazi officials believed that they were the descendants of German settlers who had emigrated to Poland. Those labelled "racially valuable" (gutrassig) were forcibly assimilated in centers and then forcibly adopted to German families and SS Home Schools. Hundreds of thousands of children, particularly in Eastern Europe, ended up joining anti-Nazi German resistance forces.

Nazis also executed underage partisans without regard for their age; two out of the three victims of the first public execution following German invasion of the USSR were underage (in the Minsk region).

Near the end of the war, in early 1945, as Germany was getting desperate, many underage males, particularly from Hitler Youth, as young as fifteen years old (and sometimes even younger), were removed from school, conscripted by the military (particularly SS) and often sent on what were essentially suicide missions. Some children were forced to or indoctrinated to participate in atrocities such as the Holocaust; others (as young as twelve) became involved in the Werwolf Nazi partisan movement.

Nazi propaganda directed at the youth, promoting concepts such as antisemitism, has also been mentioned in the context of Nazi crimes against the children. It was also instrumental in recruiting and radicalizing child soldiers.

== Notable child victims of Nazi Germany ==
- Hana Brady, a Jewish girl from Czechoslovakia, victim of Auschwitz, 13 years old
- Masha Bruskina, a Soviet partisan, 17 years old
- Anne Frank, a German-born Jewish girl and diarist, victim of Auschwitz, 15 years old
- Czesława Kwoka, a Polish Catholic who died in Auschwitz, 14 years old.
- Lepa Radić, a Yugoslav partisan, 17 years old

== See also ==
- Janusz Korczak
- List of monuments to Soviet children in World War II
- Military use of children in World War II
- Oskar Dirlewanger – notorious Nazi military officer and convicted child molester

Works about Nazi crimes against children

- Did the Children Cry: Hitler's War Against Jewish and Polish Children, 1939–45
- Teheran Children
- Voices of the Children
