= Danuta Mostwin =

Polish writer, psychologist, sociologist

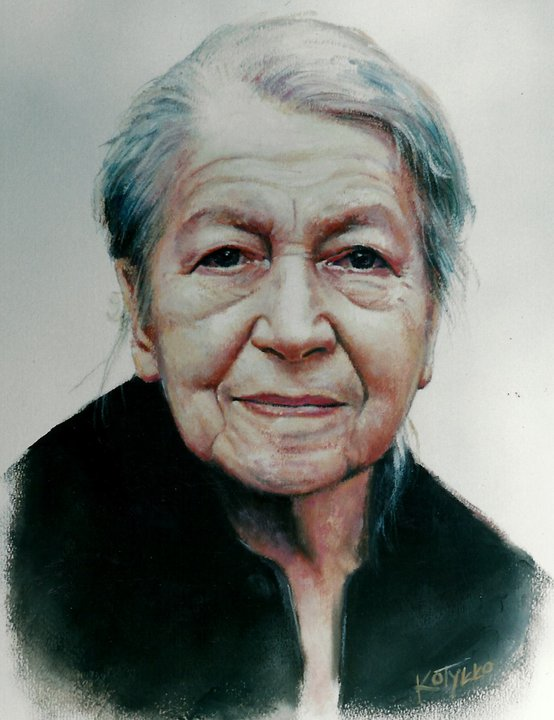
- Born: Danuta Pietruszewski; August 31, 1921; Lublin, Poland
- Died: January 11, 2010 (aged 88); Baltimore, Maryland
- Known for: Writing, Social Work

Danuta Mostwin (1921–2010) was an Polish writer, psychologist, sociologist know for her book Ameryko! Ameryko! She was twice nominated for the Nobel Prize in Literature.

Mostwin née Pietruszewski was born on August 31, 1921 in Lublin, Poland. She attended medical school at the underground University of Warsaw during Poland's occupation in World War II. In 1944 she married Stanislaw E. Bask-Mostwin with whom she had one child. Mostwin participated in the Warsaw Uprising. Mostwin, her husband, and mother fled Russia-occupied Poland for England after the war. She emigrated from England to Baltimore, Maryland, along with her husband and son. In 1971 Mostwin earned her PhD from Columbia University.

Mostwin died on January 11, 2010 in Baltimore, Maryland.
