= Karl Schleunes =

Karl Albert Schleunes (April 21, 1937 – May 15, 2021) was an American historian of the Holocaust and the German Empire.

Schleunes was born in Kiel, Wisconsin, the son of Henry Schleunes and Adelia Eickoff of Schleswig. In August 1964, he married Brenda Jean Pursel, founder and artistic director of the Touring Theatre of North Carolina.

He was a professor at the University of North Carolina at Greensboro (UNCG). Schleunes obtained his Bachelor of Arts in 1959 at Lakeland College (Wisconsin) and his Master of Arts at the University of Minnesota in 1961, where he also received his Ph.D. in 1966. From 1965 to 1971 he taught at the University of Illinois at Chicago. Since then, he was at the UNCG. In 1999 he was a guest lecturer at the Kaplan Centre of the University of Cape Town.

In the 1960s, along with a handful of European and American scholars, Schleunes helped establish a new field in modern historical studies: Holocaust studies. His ground-breaking research in the Berlin Document Center, which holds materials captured from the Germans, provided him with evidence to produce an exhaustive analysis of the policies that led to the murder of six million Jews.

In 1970, Schleunes published The Twisted Road to Auschwitz: Nazi Policy Toward German Jews, 1993-39, which was a landmark in Holocaust historiography. His interpretation of the Final Solution as a product of unplanned evolution rather than premeditated 'grand design' triggered a debate that has energized Holocaust scholarship in the two decades since its publishing.

Schleunes later worked on a book project that looked at the same problems as The Twisted Road to Auschwitz, but was drawn from the fifty years of information garnered since the launching of his book. As Schleunes said, "I learned a lot in fifty years; the book didn't learn anything."

Schleunes will be remembered for his many years of workshops sponsored by the NC Council on the Holocaust Teacher Workshops teachers across the state, and as the honoree of the Schleunes Lecture: an annual series of lectures sponsored by Jane and Richard Levy that invites well-known Holocaust scholars to speak at Greensboro College.

== Publications ==
- The Twisted Road to Auschwitz, Nazi Policy Toward German Jews, 1933-1939. UIP 1970.
- Schooling and Society: The Politics of Education in Prussia and Bavaria, 1750-1900. 1989.
- Legislating the Holocaust: The Bernhard Loesener Memoirs.
