= Barbara Tepa Lupack =

Barbara Tepa Lupack (born 1951) is an American scholar of literature. She is a professor emeritus of English at St. John's University and was an academic dean at SUNY. She has written several books on American literature and culture and on Arthurian topics.
