= Nazism =

German fascist ideology

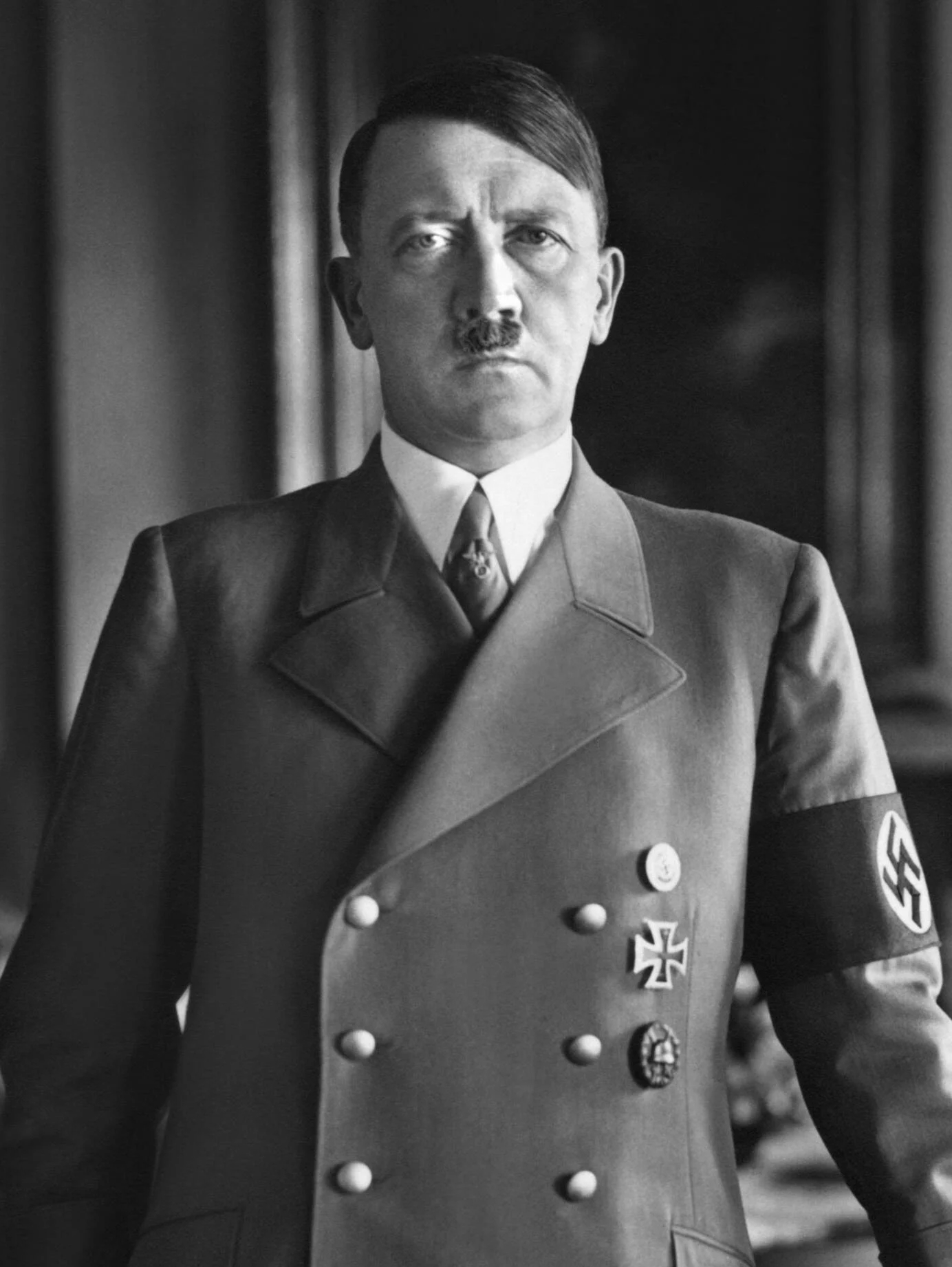
The Nazi leader Adolf Hitler (here pictured in 1938) titled himself Führer and ruled Germany from 1933 to 1945.

Nazism, (Note: /ˈnɑːtsiɪzəm, ˈnæt-, -sɪzəm/ NA(H)TS(-ee)-iz-əm) formally named National Socialism, (Note: German: Nationalsozialismus, German: [natsi̯oˈnaːlzotsi̯aˌlɪsmʊs])) is the far-right, ultranationalist, racist and totalitarian ideology associated with Adolf Hitler and the Nazi Party (NSDAP). It emerged in Germany during Hitler's rise to power and was frequently called Hitlerism. Nazism is a form of fascism that emphasizes pseudo-scientific theories of racial hierarchy which identify ethnic Germans and Nordic-Aryans as a master race. The term "neo-Nazism" is applied to far-right groups formed after World War II with a similar ideology.

Nazism opposes liberal democracy and the parliamentary system. It advocates dictatorship, fervent antisemitism, anti-communism, anti-Slavism, anti-Romani sentiment, scientific racism, white supremacy, (Note: Only aryans.) Nordicism, social Darwinism, homophobia, ableism, and eugenics. The Nazis sought to overcome social divisions and create a homogeneous German society based on racial purity. They aimed to unite all Germans living in historically German territory, gain lands for expansion under the doctrine of Lebensraum, and exclude those deemed either Community Aliens or "inferior" races (Untermenschen).

The term "National Socialism" arose from attempts to create a nationalist alternative to Marxist socialism and free-market capitalism. Nazism rejected Marxist concepts of class conflict and universal equality, opposed cosmopolitan internationalism, and sought to convince the social classes in German society to subordinate their interests to the "common good". The Nazi Party's precursor, the German Workers' Party, was founded in 1919. In 1920, the party was renamed the National Socialist German Workers' Party to appeal to left-wing workers, a renaming Hitler initially opposed. In Mein Kampf (My Struggle), Hitler outlined his antisemitism, anti-communism, and opposition to representative democracy, proposing instead the Führerprinzip (leader principle). Hitler's objectives involved eastward expansion of German territories, colonization of Eastern Europe, and an alliance with Britain and Italy against the Soviet Union.

The Nazi Party became the largest party in the German parliament in the elections of 1932, but it did not have a majority. Because other parties were unable or unwilling to form a coalition government, Hitler was appointed Chancellor in January 1933 by President Paul von Hindenburg, with the support of conservative nationalists who believed they could control Hitler. Using the Reichstag Fire Decree and the Enabling Act, the Nazis established a one-party state and began the Gleichschaltung (Nazification). Under Nazi Germany, Jews, Romani, political opponents and other "undesirable" people were marginalised, imprisoned or murdered. During World War II, millions – including two-thirds of Europe's Jewish population – were exterminated in a genocide known as the Holocaust. After Germany's defeat and the public disclosure of the full extent of the Holocaust, Nazism became widely regarded as evil. Only a few fringe racist groups, usually called neo-Nazis, describe themselves as its followers. Use of Nazi symbols is illegal in many European countries.

== Etymology ==
Nazi Party badge emblem

The full name of the Nazi Party was Nationalsozialistische Deutsche Arbeiterpartei (German for 'National Socialist German Workers' Party'), and the party officially used the acronym NSDAP. The renaming of the German Workers' Party (DAP) to the National Socialist German Workers' Party (NSDAP) was partially driven by a desire to use both left- and right-wing terminology, with "Socialist" and "Workers'" appealing to the left, and "National" and "German" appealing to the right.

George Sylvester Viereck interviewed Hitler in 1923 for the American Monthly:

"Why," I asked Hitler, "do you call yourself a National Socialist, since your party program is the very antithesis of that commonly accredited to socialism?" "Socialism," he retorted, putting down his cup of tea, pugnaciously, "is the science of dealing with the common weal. Communism is not Socialism. Marxism is not Socialism. The Marxians have stolen the term and confused its meaning. I shall take Socialism away from the Socialists. Socialism is an ancient Aryan, Germanic institution […] We demand the fulfilment of the just claims of the productive classes by the state on the basis of race solidarity. To us state and race are one."

The term nazi had been in use before the rise of the NSDAP as a colloquial and derogatory word for a backwards farmer or peasant. It characterised an awkward, clumsy person, a yokel. It was a hypocorism (pet name) of the German male name Igna(t)z (a variation of Ignatius), which was common in Bavaria, where the NSDAP originated.

In the 1920s, labour movement opponents of the NSDAP seized on this, and shortened the party's name, Nationalsozialistische, to the dismissive Nazi, to associate the NSDAP with the derogatory use of this term. This was inspired by the earlier use of the abbreviation Sozi for Sozialist (German for 'Socialist'). The first use of the term "Nazi" by the National Socialists themselves occurred in 1926 in a publication by Joseph Goebbels called Der Nazi-Sozi ("The Nazi-Sozi"). There, the term Nazi-Sozi (but not Nazi alone) is used as an abbreviation of "National Socialism".

After the NSDAP's rise to power in the 1930s, terms such as Nazi, Nazi Germany, and Nazi regime were popularised by German exiles, but were not used in Germany. The terms spread into other languages and were brought back to Germany after World War II. The NSDAP briefly adopted Nazi in an attempt to reappropriate it, for example in articles published in the Nazi newspaper Völkischer Beobachter under the title Ein Nazi fährt nach Palästina in 1934. However, the Nazis soon gave up and avoided using the term while in power. They typically referred to themselves as "National Socialists" and their movement as "National Socialism".

== Position within the political spectrum ==
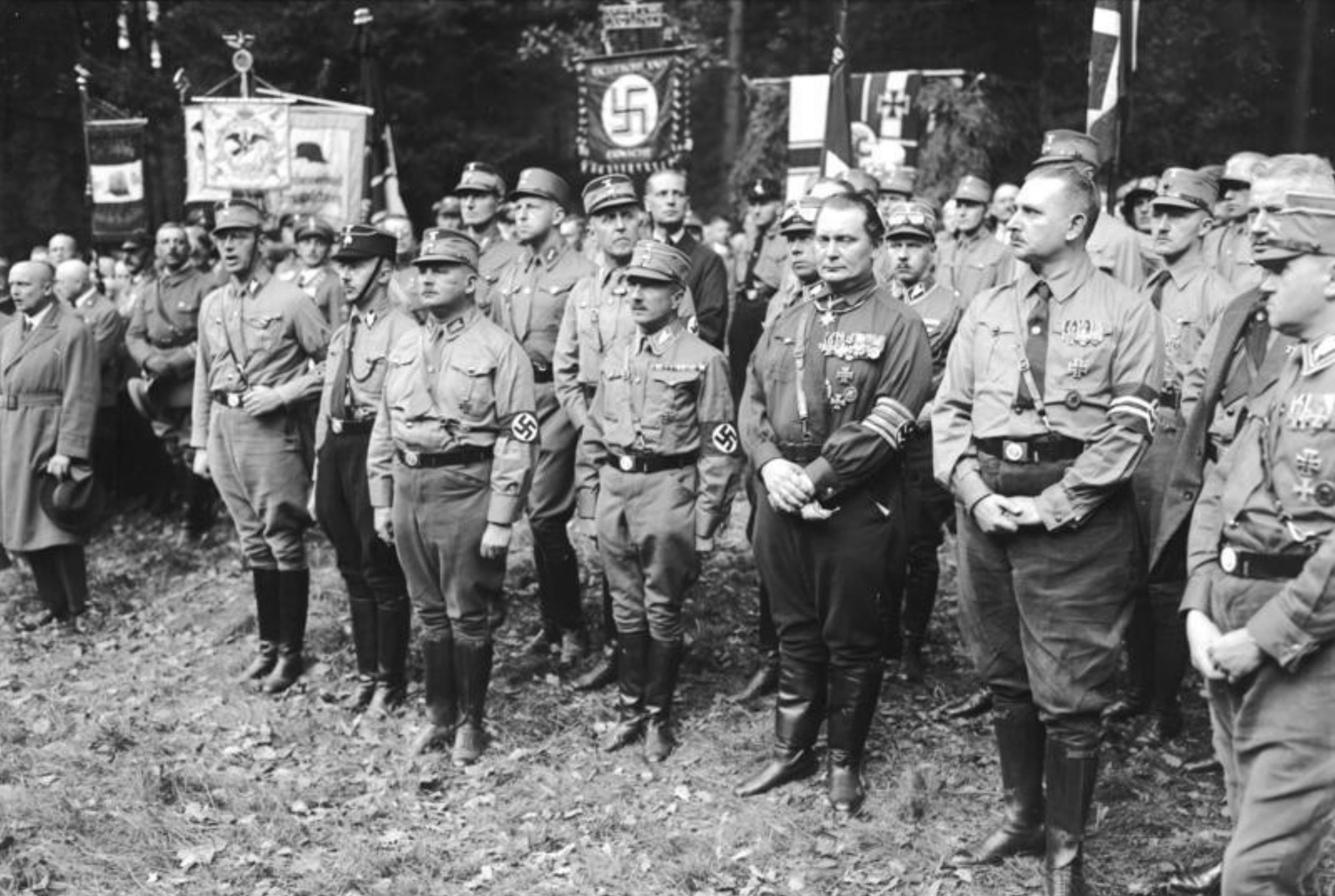
Nazis alongside members of the far-right reactionary and monarchist German National People's Party (DNVP) during the brief NSDAP–DNVP alliance in the Harzburg Front from 1931 to 1932

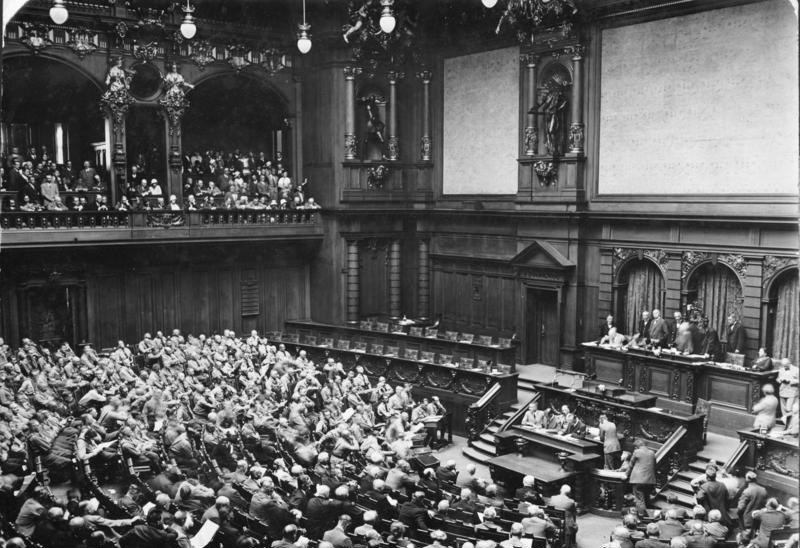
Members of the Nazi Party can be seen seated in the Reichstag in the left foreground, the far-right seats from the speakers point of view.

The majority of scholars identify Nazism, in both theory and practice, as a form of far-right politics. Far-right themes in Nazism include the argument that superior people have a right to dominate, and purge society of supposed inferior elements. When on trial in February 1924 for his leading role in the Beer Hall Putsch Hitler stated "I have resolved to be the destroyer of Marxism", a statement which he later applied to those opposed to the Nazi Party in 1926, claiming that "[t]hey tried to paralyze the one party that would have been able to give opposition to this Red pest." At times, Adolf Hitler and other proponents declared that Nazism was a “party of the right” or “the most right-wing party”, but also sometimes denied that Nazism was left or right, and instead portrayed it as syncretic, combining elements from across the political spectrum.

In a 1921 speech, Hitler stated:

There are only two possibilities in Germany; do not imagine that the people will forever go with the middle party, the party of compromises; one day it will turn to those who have most consistently foretold the coming ruin and have sought to dissociate themselves from it. And that party is either the Left: and then God help us! for it will lead us to complete destruction—to Bolshevism, or else it is a party of the Right which at the last, when the people is in utter despair, when it has lost all its spirit and has no longer any faith in anything, is determined for its part ruthlessly to seize the reins of power—that is the beginning of resistance of which I spoke a few minutes ago. Here, too, there can be no compromise – there are only two possibilities: either victory of the Aryan or annihilation of the Aryan and the victory of the Jew.

The German newspapers General-Anzeiger and Hannoverscher Kurier reported on a dispute in 1930 between the Nazi Party and the German National People's Party (DNVP), their representatives being Wilhelm Frick and Oskar Hergt respectively, concerning the seating arrangement in the Reichstag whilst Paul Löbe was serving as President of the Reichstag:

Who is furthest to the right? Berlin, September 23. In the Reichstag on Tuesday afternoon, President Löbe gathered representatives of the various parties to discuss the question of seating, which had become difficult due to the increase in the number of seats. At the end of the meeting, a dispute arose between the representatives of the German Nationals and the National Socialists over which of the two parties was the more explicitly right-wing party. Representative Hergt once again asserted his party's claim to the seat on the far-right wing of the House. Representative Dr. Frick protested against this demand. He believed that this question had been settled once and for all, namely in the sense that the National Socialists were the most right-wing party. The claim of the National Socialists was provisionally recognized in today's discussion, however subject to any agreement between the two parties or any other decision by the Council of Elders after the Reichstag has convened.

On 31 December 1930, the German newspaper Annaburger Zeitung reprinted a story from Völkischer Beobachter concerning a poll about possible involvement of the Nazi Party in government:

The Participation of the National Socialists in the Government. What the Völkische Beobachter says about it: Since the new elections to the Reichstag, the question of a reorganization of the Reich government continues to be vigorously discussed in public. The main issue is whether the National Socialists should enter the Reich government on the basis of their great electoral success or not. Left-leaning circles have repeatedly spoken out against the participation of the National Socialists in government affairs, while the parties to the right of the Center Party are actively advocating for the involvement of the National Socialists in the government. A right-wing Berlin newspaper recently conducted a survey among right-wing economists and politicians on the expediency of National Socialist participation in the Reich government. This survey came to the overwhelming conclusion that the National Socialists should be given the opportunity to assume responsibility in the Reich government. Among others, former Reichsbank President Dr. Schacht and the People's Party Reichstag deputy Colonel General von Seekt spoke in favor of this.

On the same day, the Annaburger Zeitung reported on French reactions to the 1930 German federal election:

Germany and France. It will not be so easily forgotten in Germany that, unlike America and England, France responded to the election result of September 14th with a comprehensive withdrawal of the credit invested in our economy. Twice, then, Paris had used this credit policy weapon for a purely power-political purpose: in 1929, to force Germany to accept the Entente demands at the Young Conference in Paris. And a few weeks ago, this weapon was used again to prevent what France considered an imminent shift in German politics to the right. Thus, one finds in a right-wing Parisian newspaper the view that only the fear of a "new credit freeze"—the concession inherent in it is, incidentally, quite valuable!—is preventing Germany from "throwing itself into the arms of Hitler's people" already; for Germany and its government are undoubtedly moving further and further to the right.

Hitler at times redefined socialism. In a speech he gave on 28 July 1922, he said:

Whoever is prepared to make the national cause his own to such an extent that he knows no higher ideal than the welfare of the nation; whoever has understood our great national anthem, "Deutschland über Alles," to mean that nothing in the wide world surpasses in his eyes this Germany, people and land – that man is a Socialist.

In 1929, Hitler gave a speech to Nazi leaders and simplified 'socialism' to mean, "Socialism! That is an unfortunate word altogether... What does socialism really mean? If people have something to eat and their pleasures, then they have their socialism." When asked in an interview in 1934 whether he supported the "bourgeois right-wing", Hitler claimed Nazism was not exclusively for any class stating: "From the camp of bourgeois tradition, it takes national resolve, and from the materialism of the Marxist dogma, living, creative Socialism."

Historians regard the equation of Nazism as "Hitlerism" as too simplistic, as the term was used prior to the rise of Hitler and the Nazis. Ideologies incorporated into Nazism were already well established in parts of German society long before World War I. The Nazis were strongly influenced by the post–World War I far-right, which held common beliefs such as anti-Marxism, anti-liberalism and antisemitism, along with nationalism, contempt for the Treaty of Versailles and condemnation of the Weimar Republic for signing the armistice in 1918 and later the treaty. An inspiration for the Nazis were the far-right nationalist Freikorps, paramilitary organisations that engaged in political violence after World War I. Initially, the post–World War I far-right was dominated by monarchists, but the younger generation, associated with völkisch nationalism, was more radical and did not express any emphasis on restoration of the monarchy. This younger generation desired to dismantle the Weimar Republic, and create a new, radical and strong state, based upon a martial ruling ethic that could revive the "Spirit of 1914" which was associated with national unity (Volksgemeinschaft).

The Nazis, the far-right monarchists, the reactionary German National People's Party (DNVP) and others, such as monarchist army officers and several prominent industrialists, formed an alliance in opposition to the Weimar Republic in October 1931, in Bad Harzburg, officially known as the "National Front", but referred to as the Harzburg Front. The Nazis stated the alliance was tactical and continued to have differences with the DNVP. Hugenberg intiated the alliance in the hopes of forming a united front with Hitler; even earlier in February 1931 the DNVP parliamentary group had joined the Nazi parliamentary group in dramatically walking out of the Reichstag in a protest against the government. After the elections of July 1932, the alliance temporarily broke down when the DNVP lost many seats in the Reichstag. The Nazis called them "an insignificant heap of reactionaries". The DNVP responded by attacking the Nazis for their "socialism", street violence and the "economic experiments" that would take place if the Nazis gained power. However, the spat was short-lived, and the Nazi Party and DNVP ran as coalition partners again during the November 1932 German federal election. In January 1933 the Nazi Party and DNVP entered a coalition government, bringing Hitler into power as Chancellor.

Amidst an inconclusive situation in which conservative politicians Franz von Papen and Kurt von Schleicher were unable to form governments without the Nazis, Papen proposed to President Hindenburg to appoint Hitler as Chancellor at the head of a government formed primarily of conservatives, with only three Nazi ministers. Hindenburg did so, and Hitler was able to establish a Nazi one-party dictatorship.

Kaiser Wilhelm II, who had been forced to abdicate amidst an attempted communist revolution in Germany, initially supported the Nazis. His sons became members of the Party hoping that in exchange, the Nazis would permit restoration of the monarchy. Hitler dismissed the possibility, calling it "idiotic." Wilhelm grew to distrust Hitler and was appalled at the Kristallnacht of 1938. The former emperor denounced the Nazis as a "bunch of shirted gangsters" and "a mob [...] led by a thousand liars or fanatics."

The Nazis self-identified as Fascists; in November 1922 just a few days after the March on Rome Hermann Esser declared Hitler to be a “German Mussolini”, and later that month Hitler demanded a national government for Germany based on the Fascist model. In August 1923 Hitler declared “With fanatic determination we Fascists must pursue our goal”, and Kurt Lüdecke was sent to Rome to negotiate with Mussolini on behalf of the Nazi Party the following day. There were factions within the Nazi Party, both conservative and radical. The conservative Nazi Hermann Göring urged Hitler to conciliate with capitalists and reactionaries. Other conservative Nazis included Heinrich Himmler and Reinhard Heydrich. Meanwhile, the radical Nazi Joseph Goebbels opposed capitalism, viewing it as having Jews at its core and he stressed the need for the Party to emphasise both a proletarian and national character. Those views were shared by Otto Strasser, who later left the Party and formed the Black Front in the belief Hitler had betrayed the party's socialist goals by endorsing capitalism.

When the Nazi Party emerged from obscurity to become a political force after 1929, the conservative faction rapidly gained more influence, as wealthy donors took an interest in the Nazis, as a potential bulwark against communism. The Party had previously been financed from membership dues, but after 1929 its leadership sought donations from industrialists, and Hitler began holding many fundraising meetings with business leaders. In the midst of the Great Depression, facing economic ruin and the possibility of a Communist or Social Democrat government, business turned to Nazism as a way out, as it promised to support, rather than attack, business interests. By January 1933, the Party had secured the support of important sectors of industry, mainly among steel and coal producers, insurance, and the chemical industry.

Large segments of the Party, particularly among the members of the Sturmabteilung (SA), were committed to the party's official socialist, revolutionary and anti-capitalist positions and expected a social and economic revolution when the party gained power in 1933. Just before the seizure of power, there were even Social Democrats and Communists who switched sides and became known as "Beefsteak Nazis": brown on the outside and red inside. The leader of the SA, Ernst Röhm, pushed for a "second revolution" (the first being the seizure of power) that would enact socialist policies. Röhm also desired that the SA absorb the much smaller German Army into its ranks, under his leadership. Once the Nazis achieved power, Röhm's SA was directed by Hitler to violently suppress the parties of the left, but they also attacked individuals associated with conservative reaction. Hitler saw Röhm's independent actions as violating and threatening his leadership, as well as jeopardising the regime by alienating conservative President Hindenburg and the conservative-oriented German Army. This resulted in Hitler purging Röhm and other radical members of the SA in 1934, in the Night of the Long Knives.

Hitler expressed opposition to capitalism, regarding it as having Jewish origins and holding nations ransom to a parasitic cosmopolitan rentier class. He also expressed opposition to communism and egalitarian forms of socialism, arguing that inequality and hierarchy are beneficial to the nation. He believed communism was invented by Jews to weaken nations by promoting class struggle. After seizing power, Hitler took a pragmatic position on economics, accepting private property and allowing capitalist private enterprises, so long as they adhered to the goals of the Nazi state, but not tolerating enterprises he saw as opposed to the national interest.

German business leaders disliked Nazi ideology but came to support Hitler, because they saw the Nazis as an ally to promote their interests. Business groups made significant financial contributions to the Nazi Party before and after the Nazi seizure of power, hoping that a Nazi dictatorship would eliminate the organised labour movement and left-wing parties. Hitler actively sought to gain the support of business leaders by arguing that private enterprise is incompatible with democracy.

Hitler admired the British Empire and its colonial system as proof of Germanic superiority over "inferior" races and saw the United Kingdom as Germany's natural ally. He wrote in Mein Kampf: "For a long time to come there will be only two Powers in Europe with which it may be possible for Germany to conclude an alliance. These Powers are Great Britain and Italy."

During World War Two, Hitler stated that he believed the Western Allies and Soviets were ideologically aligned. In a February 1943 letter to Mussolini, Hitler declared that the current war risked the fate of Western Civilization just as “Islam and the Mongol Conquests” had. “Bolshevism and plutocracy pursue the same goal”, and that “they are directed by the same force. Bismarck once made the statement that liberalism is the continuation of social democracy. The Jewish plutocracy, outwardly disguised as Anglo-Saxon, is likewise the champion of Bolshevism. It is therefore impossible to separate the two phenomena from one another, but rather they must be regarded as one unity.” Hitler had quoted the same statement from Otto von Bismarck in an earlier pre-war speech. Bismarck had been the chief force behind the Anti-Socialist Laws of 1878.

== Origins ==
The roots of Nazism are to be found in elements of European political culture in circulation before 1914, what Joachim Fest called the "scrapheap of ideas" then prevalent. Martin Broszat points out:

[A]lmost all essential elements of [...] Nazi ideology were to be found in the radical positions of ideological protest movements [in pre-1914 Germany]. These were: a virulent anti-Semitism, a blood-and-soil ideology, the notion of a master race, [and] the idea of territorial acquisition and settlement in the East. These ideas were embedded in a popular nationalism which was vigorously anti-modernist, anti-humanist and pseudo-religious.

Brought together, the result was an anti-intellectual and politically semi-illiterate ideology lacking cohesion, a product of mass culture which allowed its followers emotional attachment and offered a simplified and easily digestible world-view, based on a political mythology for the masses.

=== Völkisch nationalism ===
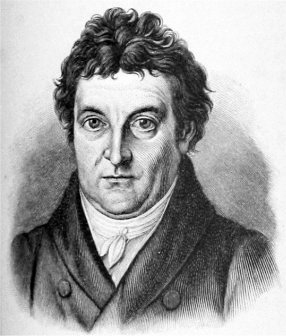
Johann Gottlieb Fichte, one of the fathers of German nationalism

Hitler, along with others in the Nazi Party, were influenced by several 19th- and early 20th-century thinkers and proponents of philosophical, onto-epistemic, and theoretical perspectives on ecological anthropology, scientific racism, holistic science, and organicism regarding the constitution of complex systems and theorization of organic-racial societies.

The ultranationalism of the Nazis originated in pan-Germanism and the ethno-nationalist Völkisch movement, which had been prominent within German nationalism since the late 19th century. Nazism was also influenced by the Freikorps paramilitary groups that emerged after Germany's defeat in World War I, which was the origin of the party's "cult of violence".

A significant influence was the 19th-century German nationalist philosopher Johann Gottlieb Fichte, whose works served as an inspiration to Hitler and other Nazis, and whose ideas were implemented among the philosophical and ideological foundations of Nazi-oriented Völkisch nationalism. In Speeches to the German Nation (1808), written amid the First French Empire's occupation of Berlin during the Napoleonic Wars, Fichte called for a German national revolution against the occupiers, making passionate speeches, arming his students for battle against the French and stressing the need for action by the German nation, so it could free itself. Fichte's German nationalism was populist and opposed to traditional elites, spoke of the need for a "People's War" (Volkskrieg) and put forth concepts similar to those which the Nazis adopted. Fichte promoted German exceptionalism and stressed the need for the German nation to purify itself (including purging German of French words, which the Nazis undertook).

Another important figure in pre-Nazi völkisch thinking was Wilhelm Heinrich Riehl, whose work—Land und Leute (Land and People, written between 1857–63)—collectively tied the organic German Volk to its native landscape and nature, a pairing in stark opposition to the mechanical and materialistic civilisation then developing as a result of industrialisation. Geographers Friedrich Ratzel and Karl Haushofer borrowed from Riehl's work as did Nazi ideologues Alfred Rosenberg and Paul Schultze-Naumburg, who employed Riehl's philosophy in arguing "each nation-state was an organism that required a particular living space in order to survive". Riehl's influence is discernible in the Blut und Boden (Blood and Soil) philosophy introduced by Oswald Spengler, which the Nazi agriculturalist Walther Darré and other prominent Nazis adopted.

Völkisch nationalism denounced soulless materialism, individualism and secularised urban industrial society, while advocating a "superior" society based on ethnic German "folk" culture and "blood". It denounced foreigners and foreign ideas and declared that Jews, Freemasons and others were "traitors to the nation" and unworthy of inclusion. Völkisch nationalism saw the world in terms of natural law and romanticism and viewed societies as organic, extolling the virtues of rural life, condemning the neglect of tradition and decay of morals, denounced the destruction of the natural environment and condemned "cosmopolitan" cultures such as Jews and Romani.

The first party that attempted to combine nationalism and socialism was the (Austria-Hungary) German Workers' Party, which aimed to solve the conflict between the Austrian Germans and Czechs in the multi-ethnic Austrian Empire, then part of Austria-Hungary. In 1896 the German politician Friedrich Naumann formed the National-Social Association, which aimed to combine German nationalism and a non-Marxist form of socialism together; the attempt turned out to be futile and the idea of linking nationalism with socialism quickly became equated with antisemites, extreme German nationalists and the völkisch movement in general.

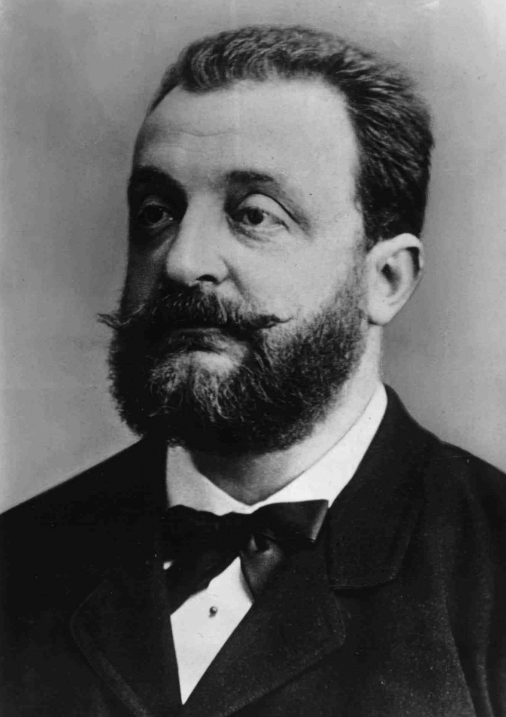
Georg Ritter von Schönerer, a major exponent of Pan-Germanism in Austria

During the German Empire, völkisch nationalism was overshadowed by Prussian patriotism and the federalist tradition of its component states. World War I, including the end of the Prussian monarchy, resulted in a surge of revolutionary völkisch nationalism. The Nazis supported such revolutionary völkisch policies and claimed their ideology was influenced by the leadership and policies of German Chancellor Otto von Bismarck, who was instrumental in founding the German Empire. The Nazis declared they were dedicated to continuing the process of creating a unified German nation state. While Hitler was supportive of Bismarck's creation of the German Empire, he was critical of Bismarck's moderate domestic policies. On the issue of Bismarck's support of a Kleindeutschland ("Lesser Germany", excluding Austria) versus the Pan-German Großdeutschland ("Greater Germany") which the Nazis advocated, Hitler stated that Bismarck's attainment of Kleindeutschland was the "highest achievement" Bismarck could have achieved "within the limits possible at that time". In Mein Kampf, Hitler presented himself as a "second Bismarck".

During his youth in Austria, Hitler was politically influenced by Austrian Pan-Germanist proponent Georg Ritter von Schönerer, who advocated radical German nationalism, antisemitism, anti-Catholicism, anti-Slavic sentiment and anti-Habsburg views. From von Schönerer and his followers, Hitler adopted the Heil greeting, Führer title and model of absolute party leadership. Hitler was also impressed by the populist antisemitism and anti-liberal bourgeois agitation of Karl Lueger, who as mayor of Vienna during Hitler's time there used rabble-rousing oratory that appealed to the masses. Unlike von Schönerer, Lueger was not a German nationalist, but a pro-Catholic Habsburg supporter and only used German nationalist notions occasionally for his agenda. Although Hitler praised Lueger and Schönerer, he criticised the former for not applying a racial doctrine against the Jews and Slavs. By comparison, the Nazis rejected Hegel for his influence on Karl Marx.

=== Racial theories and antisemitism ===
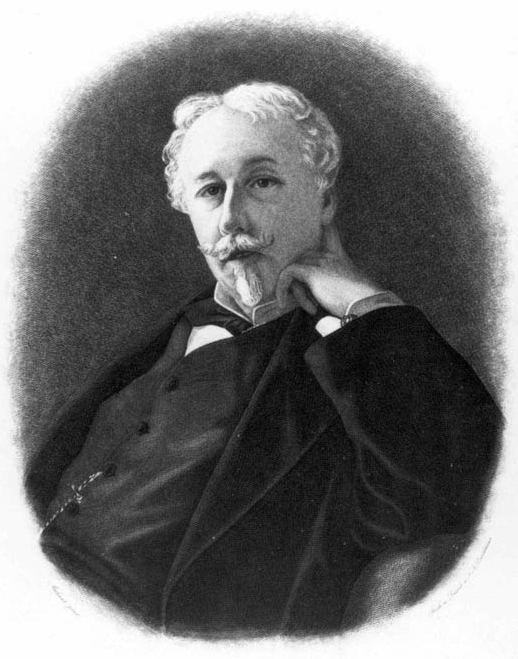
Arthur de Gobineau, one of the key inventors of the theory of the "Aryan race"

The concept of the Aryan race, which the Nazis promoted, stems from racial theories asserting that Europeans are the descendants of Indo-Iranian settlers, people of ancient India and Persia. Proponents of this based their assertion on the fact that words in European and Indo-Iranian languages have similar pronunciations and meanings. Johann Gottfried Herder argued that the Germanic peoples held close racial connections to the ancient Indians and Persians, who he claimed were advanced peoples that possessed a great capacity for wisdom, nobility, restraint and science. Contemporaries of Herder used the concept of the Aryan race to draw a distinction between what they deemed to be "high and noble" Aryan culture versus that of "parasitic" Semitic culture.

Notions of white supremacy and Aryan racial superiority were combined in the 19th century, with white supremacists maintaining the belief that certain white people were members of an Aryan "master race" superior to other races and particularly superior to the Semitic race, which they associated with "cultural sterility". Arthur de Gobineau, a French racial theorist and aristocrat, blamed the fall of the French ancien régime on racial degeneracy caused by racial intermixing, which he argued had destroyed the purity of the Aryan race, a term which he reserved for Germanic people. Gobineau's theories, which attracted a strong following in Germany, emphasised the existence of an irreconcilable polarity between Aryan (Germanic) and Jewish cultures.

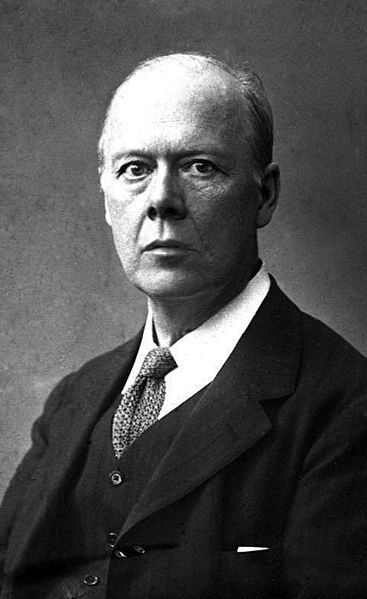
Houston Stewart Chamberlain, whose book The Foundations of the Nineteenth Century would prove to be a seminal work in the history of German nationalism

Aryan mysticism claimed that Christianity originated in Aryan religious traditions, and Jews had usurped the legend from Aryans. Houston Stewart Chamberlain, an English-born German proponent of racial theory, supported notions of Germanic supremacy and antisemitism. Chamberlain's The Foundations of the Nineteenth Century (1899), praised Germanic peoples for their creativity and idealism while asserting that the Germanic spirit was threatened by a "Jewish" spirit of selfishness and materialism. Chamberlain used his thesis to promote monarchical conservatism while denouncing democracy, liberalism and socialism. The book became popular, especially in Germany. Chamberlain stressed a nation's need to maintain its racial purity to prevent its degeneration and argued that racial intermingling with Jews should never be permitted. In 1923, Chamberlain met Hitler, whom he admired as a leader of the rebirth of the free spirit. Madison Grant's The Passing of the Great Race (1916) advocated Nordicism and proposed that a eugenics program should be implemented to preserve the purity of the Nordic race. After reading it, Hitler called it "my Bible".

In Germany, the belief that Jews were economically exploiting Germans became prominent due to the ascendancy of wealthy Jews into prominent positions upon the unification of Germany in 1871. From 1871 to the early 20th century, German Jews were overrepresented in Germany's upper and middle classes, and underrepresented in Germany's lower classes, particularly in agricultural and industrial labour. German Jewish financiers and bankers played a key role in Germany's economic growth from 1871 to 1913 and benefited enormously. In 1908, amongst the 29 wealthiest German families with fortunes of up to 55 million marks, five were Jewish and the Rothschilds were the second wealthiest. The predominance of Jews in Germany's banking, commerce and industry sectors was high, even though Jews accounted for only 1% of the population. Their overrepresentation in these sectors fuelled resentment, among non-Jewish Germans, during economic crises. The 1873 stock market crash, and ensuing depression, resulted in attacks on alleged Jewish economic dominance and antisemitism increased. In the 1870s, German völkisch nationalism began to adopt antisemitic and racist themes and was adopted by radical right political movements.

Radical antisemitism was promoted by prominent advocates of völkisch nationalism, including Eugen Diederichs, Paul de Lagarde and Julius Langbehn. De Lagarde called the Jews a "bacillus, the carriers of decay...who pollute every national culture ... and destroy all faiths with their materialistic liberalism" and he called for the extermination of the Jews. Langbehn called for a war of annihilation against the Jews, and his genocidal policies were later published by the Nazis and given to soldiers during World War II. One antisemitic ideologue of the period, Friedrich Lange, even used the term "National Socialism" to describe his anti-capitalist take on the völkisch nationalist template.

Johann Fichte accused Jews in Germany of being a "state within a state" that threatened German national unity. Fichte promoted two options to address this. His first was the creation of a Jewish state in Palestine, so the Jews could be impelled to leave Europe. His second was violence against Jews and he said the goal would be "to cut off all their heads in one night, and set new ones on their shoulders, which should not contain a single Jewish idea".

The Protocols of the Elders of Zion (1912) is an antisemitic forgery created by the secret service of the Russian Empire, the Okhrana. Many antisemites believed it was real and it became popular after World War I. The Protocols claimed there was a secret international Jewish conspiracy to take over the world. Hitler had been introduced to The Protocols by Alfred Rosenberg, and from 1920 he focused his attacks by claiming Judaism and Marxism were directly connected, that Jews and Bolsheviks were one and the same, and that Marxism was a Jewish ideology-this became known as "Jewish Bolshevism". Hitler believed The Protocols were authentic.

During his life in Vienna between 1907–13, Hitler became fervently anti-Slavic. Prior to gaining power, Hitler blamed moral degradation on Rassenschande ("racial defilement"), a way to assure followers of his antisemitism, which had been toned down for popular consumption. Prior to the induction of the Nuremberg Race Laws in 1935 by the Nazis, many German nationalists supported laws to ban Rassenschande between Aryans and Jews as racial treason. Even before the laws were passed, the Nazis banned sex and marriages between party members and Jews. Party members found guilty of Rassenschande were severely punished; some even sentenced to death.

The Nazis claimed Bismarck was unable to complete national unification because Jews had infiltrated parliament, and claimed Nazi abolition of parliament had ended this obstacle. Using the stab-in-the-back myth, the Nazis accused Jews—and other populations who it considered non-German—of possessing extra-national loyalties, thereby exacerbating German antisemitism about the Judenfrage (the Jewish Question), the far-right canard popular when the ethnic völkisch movement and its politics of Romantic nationalism for establishing a Großdeutschland, was strong.

Nazism's racial positions may have developed from views of biologists of the 19th century, including French biologist Jean-Baptiste Lamarck, through Ernst Haeckel's idealist version of Lamarckism and the father of genetics, German botanist Gregor Mendel. Haeckel's works were later condemned by the Nazis as inappropriate for "National-Socialist formation and education in the Third Reich". This may have been because of his "monist" atheistic, materialist philosophy, which the Nazis disliked, along with his friendliness to Jews, opposition to militarism and support for altruism. Unlike Darwinian theory, Lamarckian theory ranked races in a hierarchy of evolution from apes. Darwinian theory did not grade races in a hierarchy of higher or lower evolution from apes, but simply stated that all humans had progressed in their evolution from apes. Many Lamarckians viewed "lower" races as having been exposed to debilitating conditions for too long for any significant "improvement" to take place in the near future. Haeckel used Lamarckian theory to describe the existence of interracial struggle and put races on a hierarchy of evolution, ranging from wholly human to subhuman.

Mendelian inheritance, or Mendelism, was supported by the Nazis, as well as eugenicists. Mendelian inheritance declared that genetic traits and attributes were passed from one generation to another. Eugenicists used Mendelian inheritance theory to demonstrate the transfer of biological illness and impairments from parents to children, including mental disability, whereas others also used Mendelian theory to demonstrate the inheritance of social traits, with racialists claiming a racial nature behind certain traits, such as inventiveness or criminal behaviour.

==== Use of the American racist model ====
Hitler and Nazi legal theorists were inspired by America's institutional racism and saw it as the model to follow. They saw it as a model for the expansion of territory and elimination of indigenous inhabitants therefrom, for laws denying full citizenship for African Americans, which they wanted to implement against Jews, and for racist immigration laws banning "inferior" races. In Mein Kampf, Hitler extolled America as the only example of a country with racist ("völkisch") citizenship statutes in the 1920s, and Nazi lawyers made use of American models in crafting laws for Nazi Germany. US citizenship laws and anti-miscegenation laws directly inspired the two principal Nuremberg Laws—the Citizenship Law and the Blood Law.

=== Response to World War I and Italian Fascism ===
During World War I, German sociologist Johann Plenge spoke of the rise of a "National Socialism" in Germany within what he termed the "ideas of 1914" that were a declaration of war against the "ideas of 1789", the French Revolution. According to Plenge, the "ideas of 1789" which included the rights of man, democracy, individualism and liberalism were being rejected in favour of "the ideas of 1914", which included the "German values" of duty, discipline, law and order. Plenge believed ethnic solidarity (Volksgemeinschaft) would replace class division and "racial comrades" would unite to create a socialist society in the struggle of "proletarian" Germany, against "capitalist" Britain. He believed the "Spirit of 1914" manifested itself in the concept of the "People's League of National Socialism". This National Socialism was a form of state socialism that rejected the "idea of boundless freedom" and promoted an economy that would serve the whole of Germany, under the leadership of the state. This National Socialism was opposed to capitalism due to the components that were against "the national interest", but insisted National Socialism would strive for greater efficiency in the economy. Plenge advocated an authoritarian, rational ruling elite to develop National Socialism through a hierarchical technocratic state, and his ideas were part of the basis for Nazism.

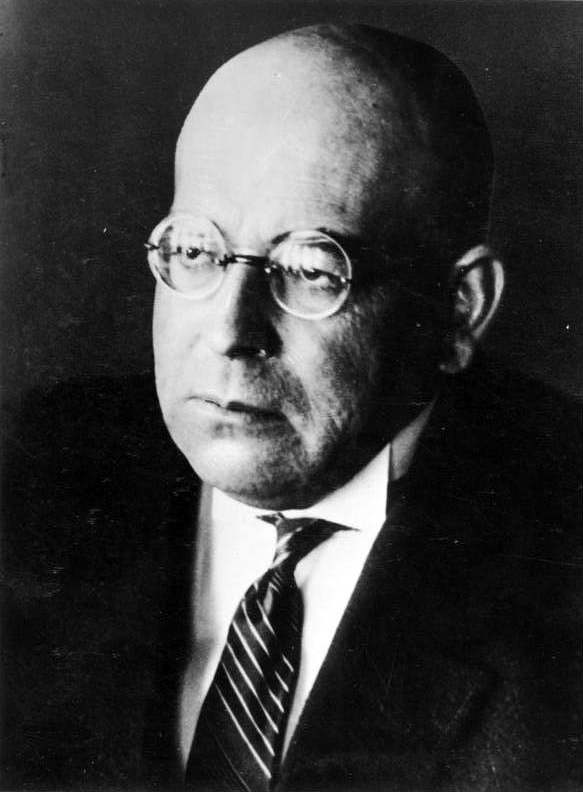
Oswald Spengler, a philosopher of history

Oswald Spengler, a German cultural philosopher, was a major influence on Nazism, although after 1933 he became alienated from it and was condemned by the Nazis for criticising Hitler. Spengler's conception of national socialism and several of his political views were shared by the Nazis and the Conservative Revolutionary movement.

Spengler's The Decline of the West (1918), written during the end of World War I, addressed the supposed decadence of European civilisation, which he claimed was caused by atomising and irreligious individualisation and cosmopolitanism. Spengler's thesis was that a law of historical development of cultures existed involving a cycle of birth, maturity, ageing and death when they reached their final form of civilisation. Upon reaching civilisation, a culture will lose its creative capacity and succumb to decadence until the emergence of "barbarians" creates a new epoch. Spengler considered the Western world as having succumbed to decadence of intellect, money, cosmopolitan urban life, irreligious life, atomised individualisation and believed it was at the end of its biological and "spiritual" fertility. He believed the "young" German nation as an imperial power would inherit the legacy of Ancient Rome, lead a restoration of value in "blood" and instinct, while the ideals of rationalism would be revealed as absurd.

Spengler's notions of "Prussian socialism" as described in his book Preussentum und Sozialismus ("Prussiandom and Socialism", 1919), influenced Nazism and the Conservative Revolutionary movement. Spengler wrote: "The meaning of socialism is that life is controlled not by the opposition between rich and poor, but by the rank that achievement and talent bestow. That is our freedom, freedom from the economic despotism of the individual". Spengler adopted the anti-English ideas addressed by Plenge and Sombart during World War I that condemned English liberalism and English parliamentarianism while advocating a national socialism that was free from Marxism and that would connect the individual to the state through corporatist organisation. Spengler claimed that socialistic Prussian characteristics existed across Germany, including creativity, discipline, concern for the greater good, productivity and self-sacrifice. He prescribed war as a necessity by saying: "War is the eternal form of higher human existence and states exist for war: they are the expression of the will to war".

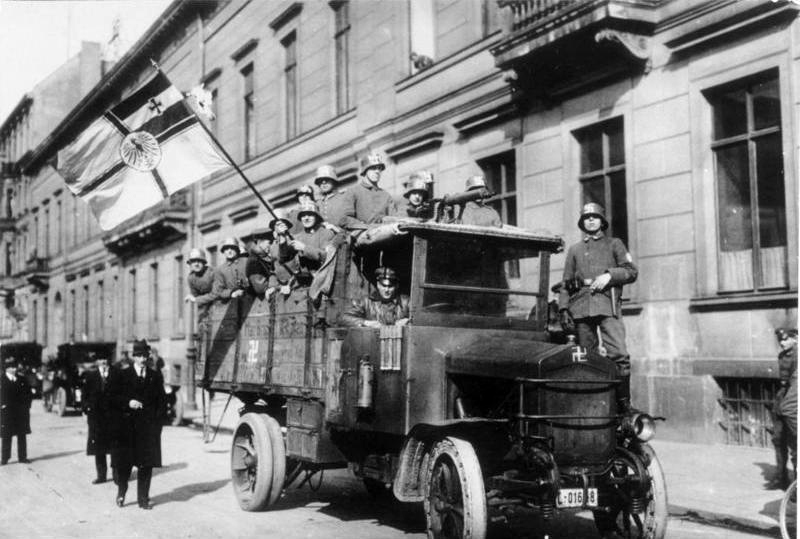
The Marinebrigade Ehrhardt during the Kapp Putsch in Berlin, 1920 The Marinebrigade Erhardt used the swastika as its symbol, as seen on their helmets and on the truck, which inspired the Nazi Party to adopt it as the movement's symbol.

Spengler's definition of socialism did not advocate a change to property relations. He denounced Marxism for seeking to train the proletariat to "expropriate the expropriator", the capitalist, and then to let them live a life of leisure on this expropriation. He claimed that "Marxism is the capitalism of the working class" and not true socialism. According to Spengler, true socialism would be in the form of corporatism, stating that "local corporate bodies organised according to the importance of each occupation to the people as a whole; higher representation in stages up to a supreme council of the state; mandates revocable at any time; no organised parties, no professional politicians, no periodic elections".

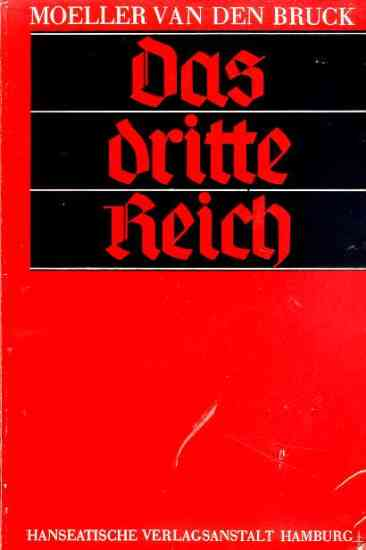
Das Dritte Reich (1923), translated as "The Third Reich", by Arthur Moeller van den Bruck

Wilhelm Stapel, an antisemitic German intellectual, used Spengler's thesis on the cultural confrontation between Jews, whom Spengler described as a Magian people, versus Europeans, as a Faustian people. Stapel described Jews as a landless nomadic people in pursuit of an international culture whereby they can integrate into Western civilisation. As such, Stapel claims that Jews have been attracted to "international" versions of socialism, pacifism or capitalism, because as a landless people the Jews have transgressed national cultural boundaries.

For all of Spengler's influence on the movement, he was opposed to its antisemitism. He wrote in his personal papers "[H]ow much envy of the capability of other people in view of one's lack of it lies hidden in anti-Semitism!" as well as "[W]hen one would rather destroy business and scholarship than see Jews in them, one is an ideologue, i.e., a danger for the nation. Idiotic."

Arthur Moeller van den Bruck, who was initially the dominant figure of the Conservative Revolutionaries, influenced Nazism. He rejected reactionary conservatism while proposing a new state that he called the "Third Reich", which would unite all classes under authoritarian rule. Van den Bruck advocated a combination of the nationalism of the right and socialism of the left.

Fascism was a major influence on Nazism. The seizure of power by fascist leader Benito Mussolini in the March on Rome in 1922 drew admiration by Hitler, who less than a month later had begun to model himself and the Nazi Party upon Mussolini and the Fascists. Hitler presented the Nazis as a form of German fascism. In 1923, the Nazis attempted a "March on Berlin" modelled after the March on Rome, which resulted in the failed Beer Hall Putsch in Munich.

Hitler spoke of Nazism being indebted to the success of Fascism's rise to power in Italy. In a private conversation in 1941, Hitler said that "the brown shirt would probably not have existed without the black shirt", the "brown shirt" referring to the Nazi militia and the "black shirt" referring to the Fascist militia. He said in regards to the 1920s: "If Mussolini had been outdistanced by Marxism, I don't know whether we could have succeeded in holding out. At that period National Socialism was a very fragile growth".

Some Nazis—especially those associated with the party's more radical wing, such as Gregor Strasser — were critical of Italian Fascism, perceiving it as being too conservative or capitalist (Strasser also criticized the policy of Führerprinzip as being created by Mussolini and considered its presence in Nazism as a foreign-imported idea.). In fact, Nazi Germany engaged in mass-scale privatization (coining the term) after Hitler’s rise to power at a time when other western nations were nationalizing industry, whereas Fascist Italy engaged in mass-nationalization of industry and banking in the 1920s and 1930s, resulting in the Italian state owning 40 percent of the total economy. Some Nazis had other criticisms such as Alfred Rosenberg who criticized the intermittent philosemitism of Italian Fascism and believed it was racially confused. Several lower-ranking Nazis scornfully viewed Fascism as lacking full revolutionary potential. Hitler himself however declared National Socialism a “fascistization” of Germany, while Mussolini applauded National Socialism’s advance, which he eventually termed as “German Fascism”. As of 1928 the NSDAP was being subsidized by the Italian state.

== Ideology and programme ==
In his book The Hitler State (Der Staat Hitlers), historian Martin Broszat writes:

...National Socialism was not primarily an ideological and programmatic, but a charismatic movement, whose ideology was incorporated in the Führer, Hitler, and which would have lost all its power to integrate without him. ... [T]he abstract, utopian and vague National Socialistic ideology only achieved what reality and certainty it had through the medium of Hitler.

Thus, analysis of the ideology of Nazism is usually descriptive, as it was not generated from first principles, but was the result of numerous factors, including Hitler's personal views, parts of the 25-point plan, the general goals of the völkische and nationalist movements, and conflicts between party functionaries who battled "to win [Hitler] over to their respective interpretations of [National Socialism]." Once the party had been purged of divergent influences such as Strasserism, Hitler was accepted by its leadership as the "supreme authority to rule on ideological matters".

Nazi ideology was based on a bio-geo-political "Weltanschauung" (worldview), advocating territorial expansionism to cultivate what it viewed as a "purified and homogeneous Aryan population." Nazi regime policies were shaped by the integration of biopolitics and geopolitics within the Hitlerian worldview, amalgamating spatial theory, practice, and imagination with biopolitics. In Hitlerism, the concepts of space and race existed in tension, forming a distinct bio-geo-political framework at the core of the Nazi project. This ideology viewed German territorial conquests and extermination of those ethnic groups it dehumanised as "untermensch" as part of a biopolitical process to establish an ideal German community.

=== Nationalism and racialism ===
Nazism emphasised German nationalism, including irredentism and expansionism. Nazism held racial theories based upon a belief in the existence of an Aryan master race, superior to all other races. The Nazis emphasised the existence of conflict between the Aryan race and others—particularly Jews, whom the Nazis viewed as a mixed race that had infiltrated multiple societies and was responsible for exploitation and repression of the Aryan race. The Nazis also categorised Slavs as Untermensch (sub-human).

Wolfgang Bialas argues the Nazis' sense of morality could be described as a form of procedural virtue ethics, as it demanded unconditional obedience to absolute virtues, with the attitude of social engineering and replaced common sense intuitions with an ideological catalogue of virtues and commands. The ideal Nazi new man was to be race-conscious, and an ideologically-dedicated warrior, who committed actions for the sake of the German race, while convinced he was acting morally. The Nazis believed an individual could only develop their capabilities and individual characteristics within the framework of the individual's racial membership; the race one belonged to determined whether or not one was worthy of moral care. The Christian concept of self-denial was replaced with the idea of self-assertion towards those deemed inferior. Natural selection and the struggle for existence were declared by the Nazis to be the most divine laws; peoples and individuals deemed inferior were said to be incapable of surviving without those deemed superior, yet by doing so they imposed a burden on the superior. Natural selection was deemed to favour the strong over the weak and the Nazis deemed that protecting those declared inferior was preventing nature from taking its course; those incapable of asserting themselves were viewed as doomed to annihilation, with the right to life being granted only to those who could survive on their own.

==== Irredentism and expansionism ====
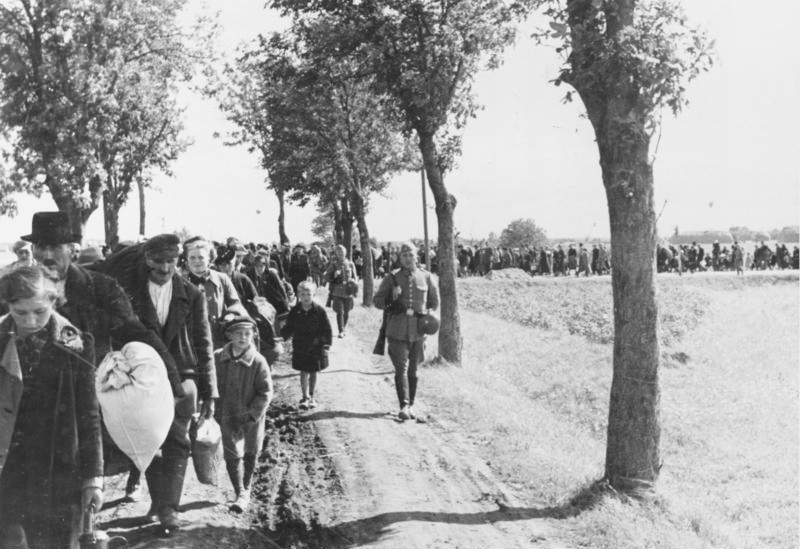
Beginning of Lebensraum, the Nazi German expulsion of Poles from central Poland, 1939

At the core of Nazi ideology was the bio-geo-political project to acquire Lebensraum ("living space") through territorial conquests. The German Nazi Party supported German irredentist claims to Austria, Alsace-Lorraine, the Sudetenland, and the Polish Corridor. A key policy of the German Nazi Party was Lebensraum for the German nation based on claims Germany was facing an overpopulation crisis and expansion was needed to end overpopulation within existing territory, and provide resources necessary for its people's well-being. The party publicly promoted the expansion of Germany into territories held by the Soviet Union.

In Mein Kampf, Hitler stated that Lebensraum would be acquired in Eastern Europe, especially Russia. In his early years as leader, Hitler claimed he would be willing to accept friendly relations with Russia on the tactical condition that Russia agree to return to the borders established by the German–Russian Treaty of Brest-Litovsk from 1918, which gave large territories held by Russia to German control in exchange for peace. In 1921, Hitler had commended the Treaty as opening the possibility for restoration of relations between Germany and Russia by saying:

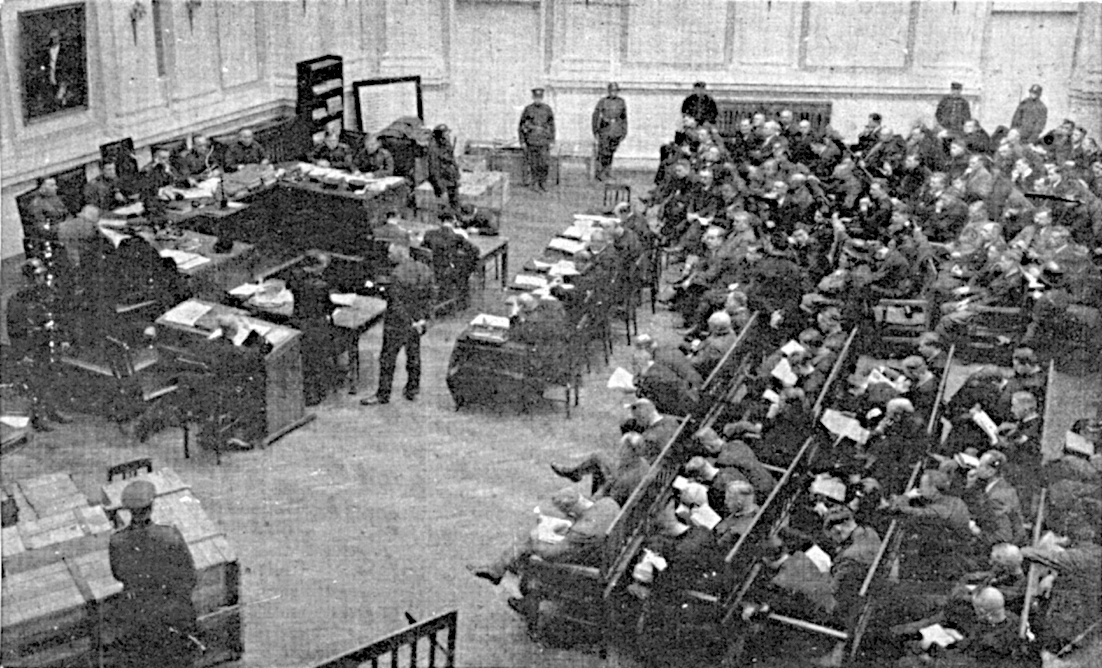
The first trial of the Nazis in Europe, which took place in Kaunas in 1935. The accused claimed that the Klaipėda Region should be part of Germany, not Lithuania, and spread propaganda, prepared for an armed uprising.

Through the peace with Russia the sustenance of Germany as well as the provision of work were to have been secured by the acquisition of land and soil, by access to raw materials, and by friendly relations between the two lands.

— Adolf Hitler

From 1921 to 1922, Hitler called for the achievement of Lebensraum, involving a territorially-reduced Russia, as well as supporting Russian nationalists in overthrowing the Bolsheviks and establishing a new White Russian government. Hitler's attitudes changed by the end of 1922, in which he then supported an alliance of Germany with Britain to destroy Russia. Hitler later declared how far he intended to expand Germany into Russia:

Asia, what a disquieting reservoir of men! The safety of Europe will not be assured until we have driven Asia back behind the Urals. No organized Russian state must be allowed to exist west of that line.

— Adolf Hitler

Hitler's doctrine of Lebensraum

"For the future of the German nation the 1914 frontiers are of no significance. They did not serve to protect us in the past, nor do they offer any guarantee for our defence in the future. With these frontiers the German people cannot maintain themselves as a compact unit, nor can they be assured of their maintenance. ... Against all this we, National Socialists, must stick firmly to the aim that we have set for our foreign policy; namely, that the German people must be assured the territorial area which is necessary for it to exist on this earth. ... The right to territory may become a duty when a great nation seems destined to go under unless its territory be extended. And that is particularly true when the nation in question is not some little group of negro people but the Germanic mother of all the life which has given cultural shape to the modern world."

— Adolf Hitler, ("Mein Kampf", Volume 2, Chapter 14: "Germany's policy in Eastern Europe")

Lebensraum policy involved expansion of Germany's borders to east of the Ural Mountains. Hitler planned for the "surplus" Russian population living west of the Urals to be deported to the east of them.

Adam Tooze explains that Hitler believed Lebensraum was vital to securing American-style consumer affluence for the German people. In this light, Tooze argues that the view the regime faced a "guns or butter" contrast is mistaken. While it is true that resources were diverted from civilian consumption to military production, Tooze explains that at a strategic level "guns were ultimately viewed as a means to obtaining more butter".

While the Nazi pre-occupation with agrarian living and food production are often seen as a sign of their backwardness, Tooze explains this was in fact a driving issue in European society for at least the last two centuries. The issue of how European societies should respond to the new global economy in food was a major issue facing Europe in the early 20th century. Agrarian life in Europe was incredibly common—in the early 1930s, over 9 million Germans (a third of the workforce) still worked in agriculture and many not working in it still had allotments or otherwise grew their food. Tooze estimates half the German population in the 1930s was living in towns and villages with populations under 20,000. Many in cities still had memories of rural-urban migration—Tooze thus explains that Nazis' obsession with agrarianism was not an atavistic gloss on a modern industrial nation, but a consequence of the fact that Nazism was the product of a society still in economic transition.

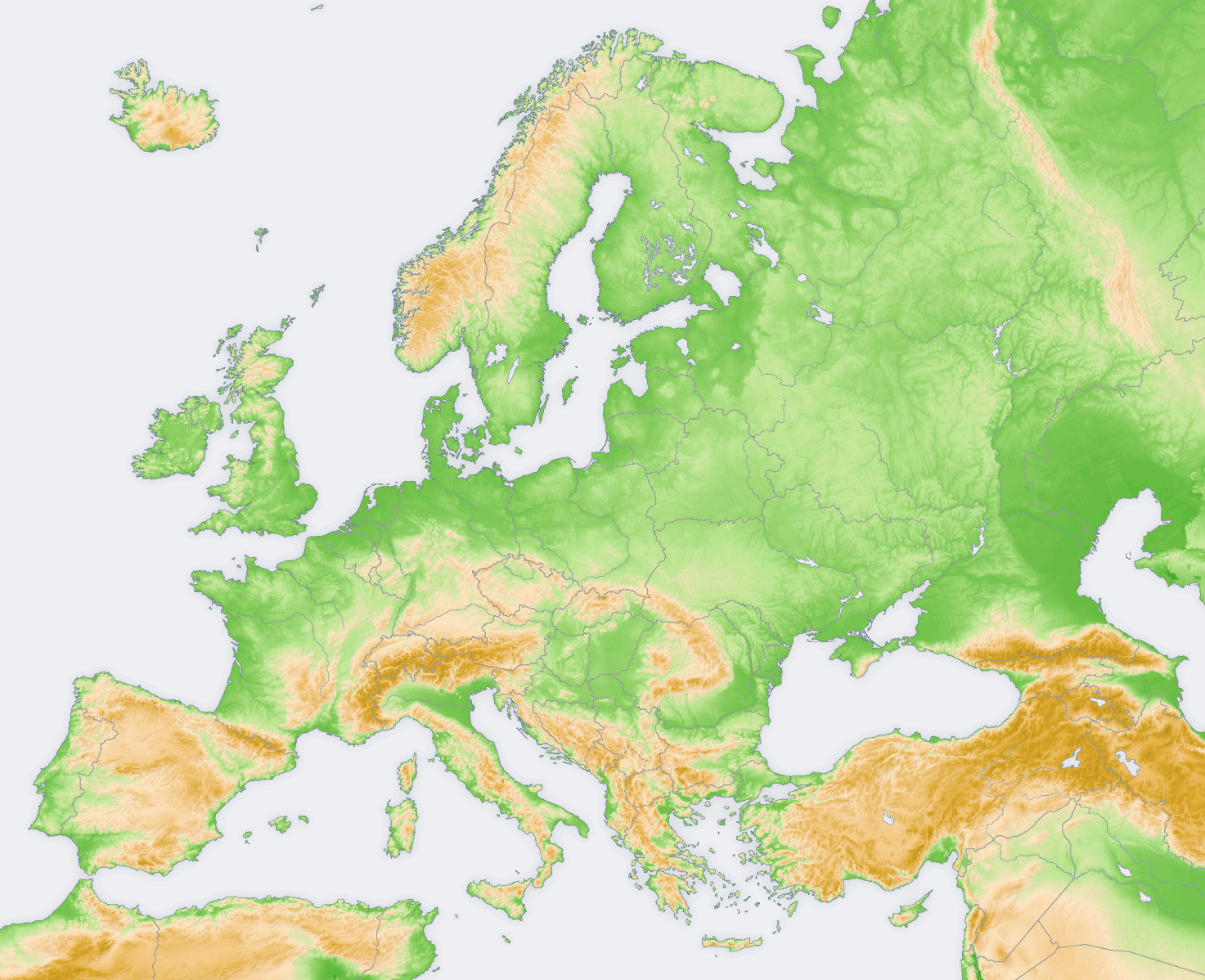
Topographical map of Europe: the Nazi Party declared support for Drang nach Osten (expansion of Germany east to the Ural Mountains), that is shown on the upper right side of the map as a brown diagonal line.

The Nazis obsession with food production was a consequence of the First World War. While Europe was able to avert famine with international imports, blockades brought the issue of food security back into politics, the Allied blockade of Germany in and after World War I did not cause a famine, but chronic malnutrition killed about 600,000 people in Germany and Austria. The economic crises of the interwar period meant most Germans had memories of acute hunger. Thus Tooze concludes the Nazis' obsession with acquiring land was not a case of "turning back the clock", but a refusal to accept that the result of the distribution of land, resources and population, after the imperialist wars of the 18th and 19th centuries, should be accepted as final. While the victors of the First World War had suitable agricultural land to population ratios, large empires, or both, meaning the issue of living space was closed, the Nazis, knowing Germany lacked either, refused to accept Germany's place as a medium-sized workshop dependent on imported food.

The conquest of Lebensraum was an initial step towards the final Nazi goal of complete German global hegemony. Rudolf Hess relayed to Walter Hewel Hitler's belief that world peace could only be acquired "when one power, the racially best one, has attained uncontested supremacy". When this control would be achieved, this power could then set up for itself a world police and assure itself "the necessary living space. [...] The lower races will have to restrict themselves accordingly".

==== Racial theories ====
In its racial categorisation, Nazism viewed what it called the Aryan race as the master race of the world—a race superior to all other races. It viewed Aryans as being in conflict with a mixed race people, the Jews, whom the Nazis identified as a dangerous enemy. It also viewed several other peoples as dangerous to the Aryan race. To preserve the perceived racial purity of the Aryans, race laws were introduced in 1935, known as the Nuremberg Laws. At first these prevented sexual relations and marriages between Germans and Jews, and later extended to the "Gypsies, Negroes, and their bastard offspring", who were described as of "alien blood". Such relations between Aryans (cf. Aryan certificate) and non-Aryans were now punishable under the race laws as Rassenschande or "race defilement". After the war began, defilement law was extended to include all foreigners (non-Germans). At the bottom of the racial scale of non-Aryans were Jews, Romanis, Slavs and blacks. To maintain the "purity and strength" of the Aryan race, the Nazis eventually sought to exterminate Jews, Romani, Slavs and the physically and mentally disabled. Other groups deemed "degenerate" and "asocial" who were not targeted for extermination, but for exclusionary treatment by the Nazi state, included homosexuals, blacks, Jehovah's Witnesses and political opponents. One of Hitler's ambitions at the start of the war was to exterminate, expel or enslave Slavs from Central and Eastern Europe, to acquire Lebensraum for German settlers.

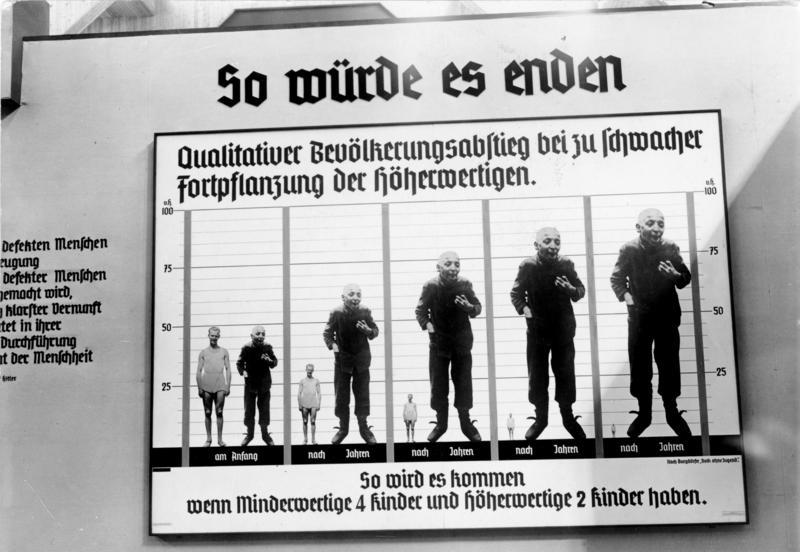
A "poster information" from the exhibition "Miracle of Life" in Berlin in 1935

A Nazi-era textbook entitled Heredity and Racial Biology for Students, by Jakob Graf, described the Nazi conception of the Aryan race in a section titled "The Aryan: The Creative Force in Human History". Graf claimed the original Aryans developed from Nordic peoples who invaded Ancient India, launched the development of Aryan culture that spread to ancient Persia, and were responsible for the latter's development into an empire. He claimed that ancient Greek culture was developed by Nordic peoples due to paintings which showed Greeks who were tall, light-skinned, light-eyed, blond-haired. He said the Roman Empire was developed by the Italics who were related to the Celts who were also Nordic. He believed the vanishing of the Nordic component of the populations in Ancient Greece and Ancient Rome led to their downfall. The Renaissance was claimed to have developed in the Western Roman Empire because of the Migration Period that brought new Nordic blood, such as the presence of Nordic blood in the Lombards; that remnants of the Visigoths were responsible for the creation of the Spanish Empire; and that the heritage of the Franks, Goths and Germanic peoples in France was responsible for its rise as a major power. He claimed the rise of the Russian Empire was due to its leadership by people of Norman descent. He described the rise of Anglo-Saxon societies in North America, South Africa and Australia as being the result of the Nordic heritage of Anglo-Saxons. He concluded: "Everywhere Nordic creative power has built mighty empires with high-minded ideas, and to this very day Aryan languages and cultural values are spread over a large part of the world, though the creative Nordic blood has long since vanished in many places".

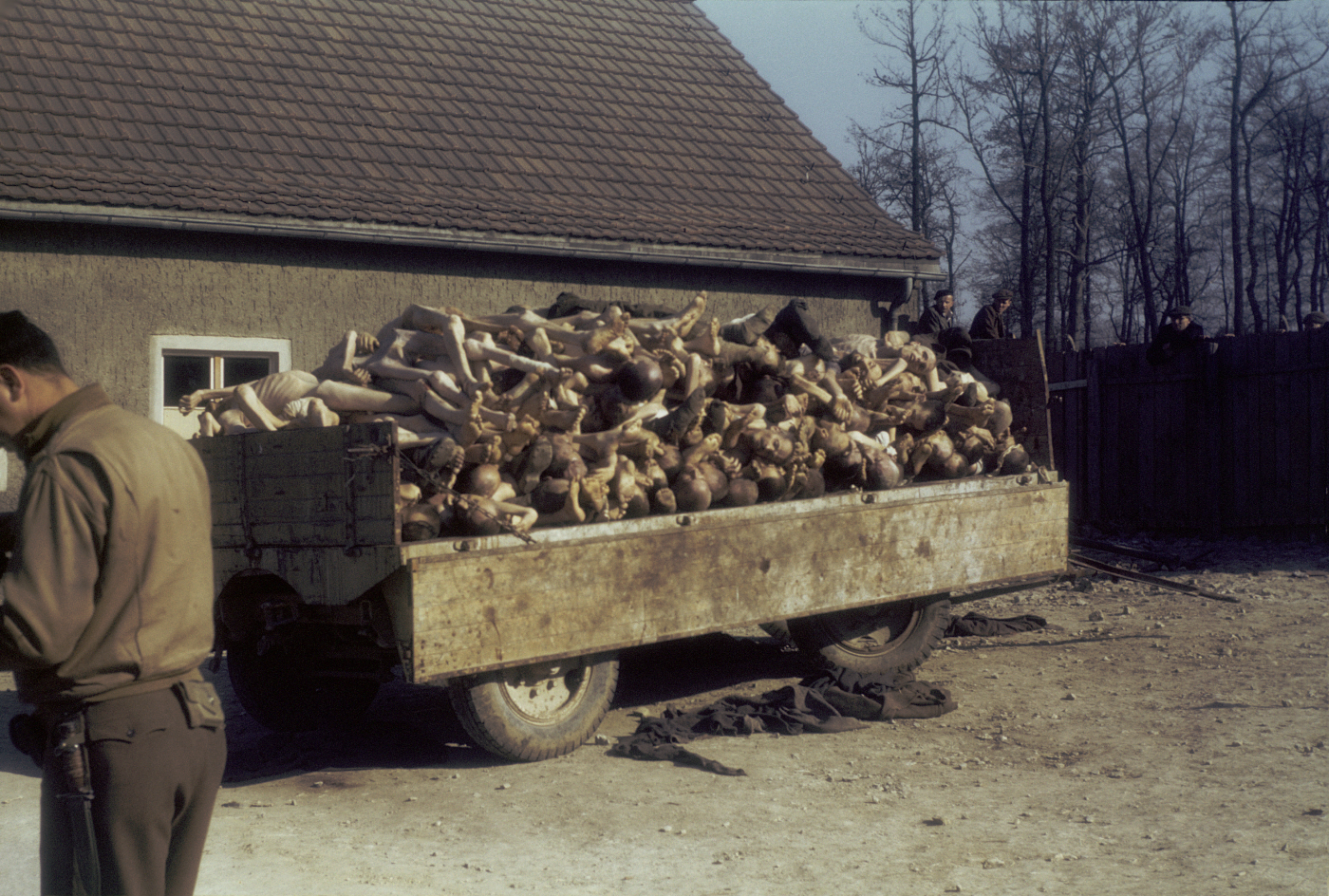
A wagon piled high with corpses outside the crematorium in Buchenwald concentration camp

In Nazi Germany, the idea of creating a master race resulted in efforts to "purify" the Deutsche Volk through eugenics and its culmination was the compulsory sterilisation or involuntary euthanasia of physically or mentally disabled people. After World War II, the euthanasia programme was named Action T4. The ideological justification for euthanasia was Hitler's view of Sparta as the original völkisch state and he praised Sparta's dispassionate destruction of congenitally-deformed infants to maintain racial purity. Some non-Aryans enlisted in Nazi organisations like the Hitler Youth and the Wehrmacht, including Germans of African descent and Jewish descent. The Nazis began to implement "racial hygiene" policies as soon as they came to power. The 1933 "Law for the Prevention of Hereditarily Diseased Offspring" prescribed compulsory sterilisation for people with a range of conditions which were thought to be hereditary, such as schizophrenia, epilepsy, Huntington's chorea and "imbecility". Sterilization was also mandated for chronic alcoholism and other forms of social deviance. An estimated 360,000 people were sterilised between 1933-39. Although some Nazis suggested the programme should be extended to people with physical disabilities, such ideas had to be expressed carefully, given some Nazis had physical disabilities, such as Joseph Goebbels, who had a deformed right leg.

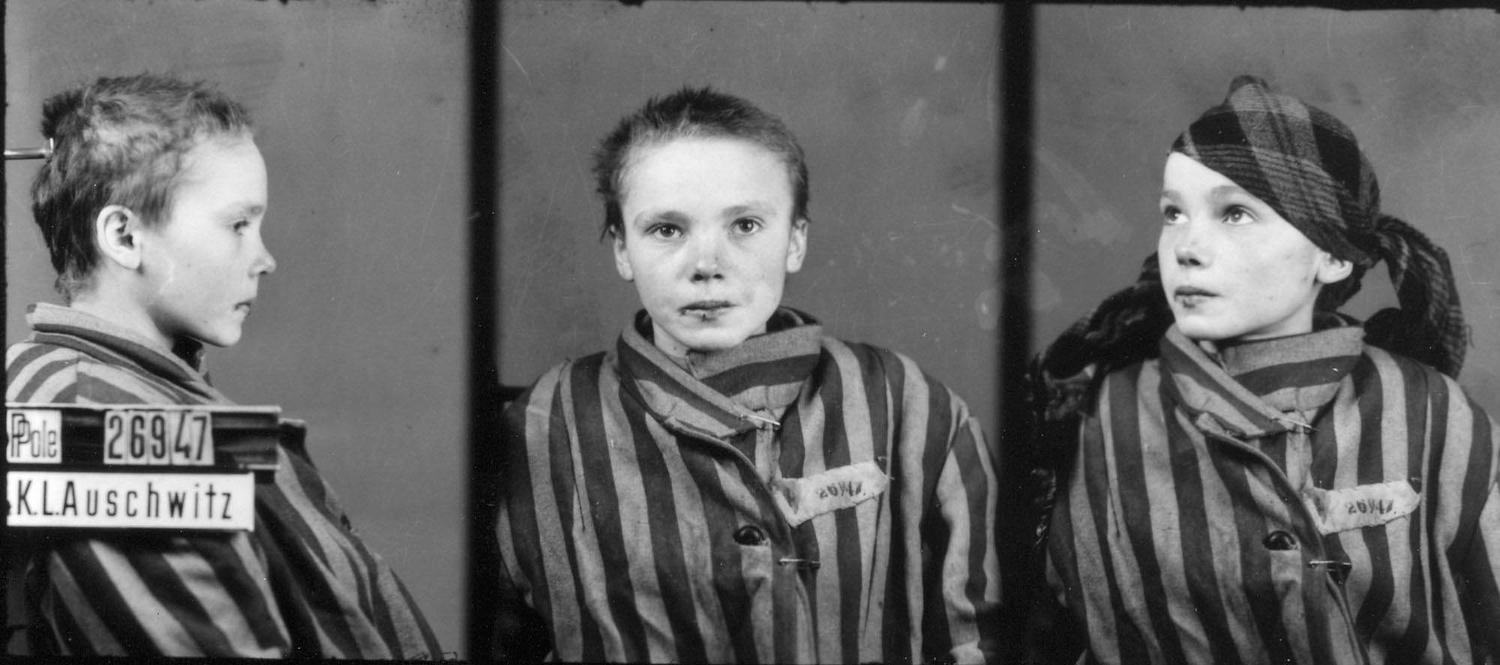
One of many Polish children murdered in Auschwitz by the Nazis. The Generalplan Ost envisaged the deportation, extermination, Germanization and enslavement of all or most Poles, Czechs, Ukrainians, Belarusians and Russians.

Nazi racial theorist Hans F. K. Günther argued European peoples were divided into five races: Nordic, Mediterranean, Dinaric, Alpine and East Baltic. Günther applied a Nordicist conception to justify his belief that Nordics were the highest in the racial hierarchy. In Rassenkunde des deutschen Volkes (1922) ("Racial Science of the German People"), Günther recognised Germans as being composed of all five races, but emphasised the strong Nordic heritage among them. Hitler read Rassenkunde des deutschen Volkes, which influenced his racial policy. Gunther believed Slavs belonged to an "Eastern race" and warned against Germans mixing with them. The Nazis described Jews as being a racially mixed group of primarily Near Eastern and Oriental racial types. Because such racial groups were concentrated outside Europe, the Nazis claimed Jews were "racially alien" to all European peoples and did not have deep racial roots in Europe.

Günther emphasised Jews' Near Eastern racial heritage. Günther identified the mass conversion of the Khazars to Judaism in the 8th century as creating two branches of the Jewish people: those of primarily Near Eastern racial heritage became the Ashkenazi Jews (that he called Eastern Jews) while those of Oriental racial heritage became the Sephardi Jews (that he called Southern Jews). Günther claimed the Eastern type was composed of commercially spirited and artful traders, and held psychological manipulation skills which aided them in trade. He claimed the Eastern race had been "bred not so much for the conquest and exploitation of nature as it had been for the conquest and exploitation of people". Günther believed European peoples had a racially-motivated aversion to peoples of Near Eastern racial origin and their traits, and as evidence of this he showed examples of depictions of satanic figures with Near Eastern physiognomies in art.

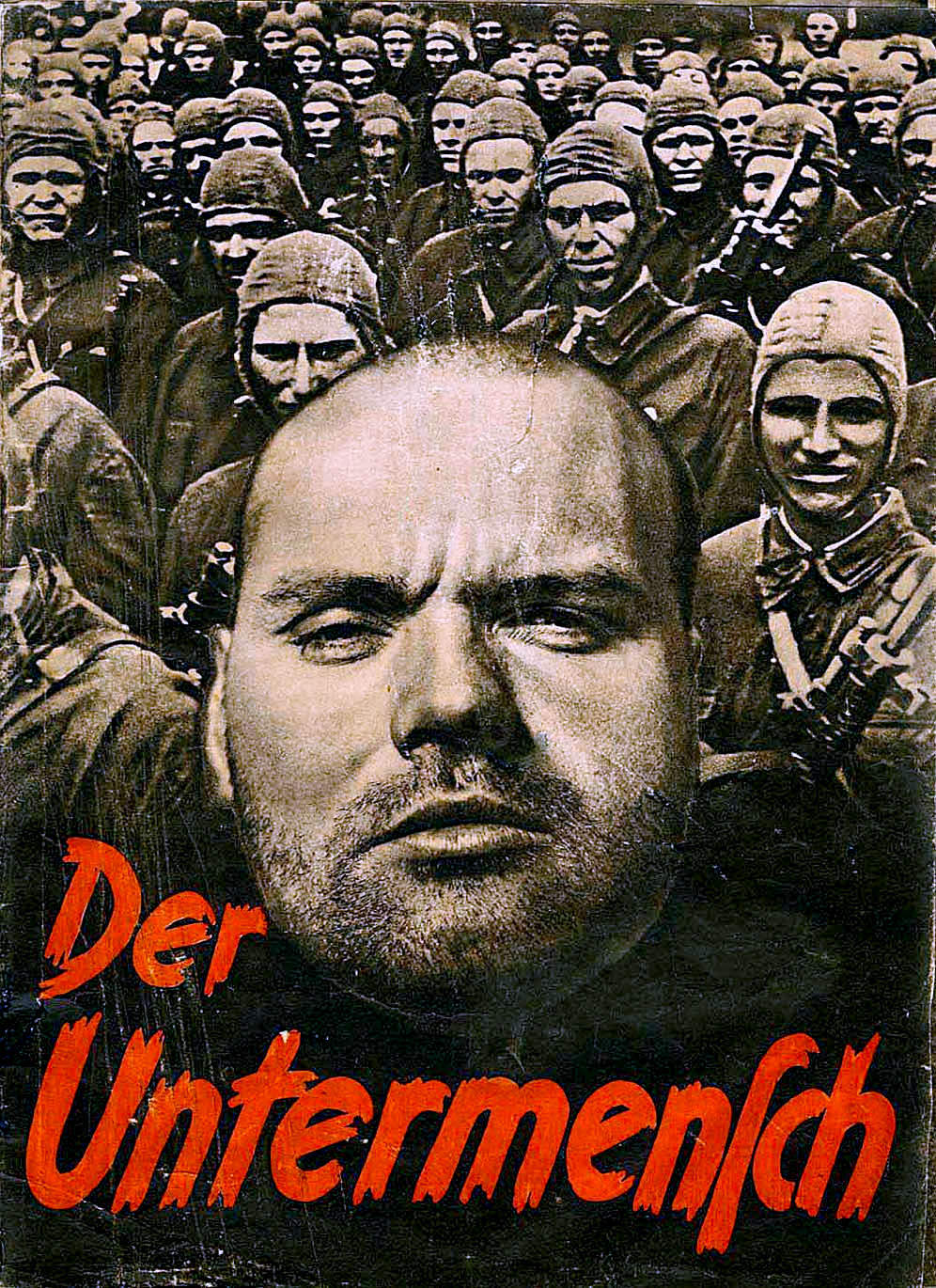
Cover of the racist booklet "Der Untermensch" published by SS in 1942. 4 million copies of the brochure were printed by Nazi Germany and distributed across occupied territories. The pamphlet depicted the Slavic and Jewish inhabitants of Eastern Europe as primitive people.

Hitler's conception of the Aryan Herrenvolk (master race) excluded most Slavs from Central and Eastern Europe. They were regarded as a race disinclined to a higher form of civilisation, which was under an instinctive force that reverted them back to nature. The Nazis regarded Slavs as having dangerous Jewish and Asiatic, meaning Mongol, influences. Because of this, the Nazis declared Slavs to be Untermenschen ("subhumans").

Nazi anthropologists attempted to scientifically prove the historical admixture of the Slavs who lived further East and Günther regarded the Slavs as being primarily Nordic centuries ago, but had mixed with non-Nordics. Exceptions were made for a few Slavs who the Nazis saw as descended from German settlers and therefore fit to be Germanised and considered part of the Aryan master race. Hitler described Slavs as "a mass of born slaves who feel the need for a master". Himmler classified Slavs as "bestial untermenschen" and Jews as the "decisive leader of the Untermenschen". These ideas were fervently advocated through Nazi propaganda, which indoctrinated many Germans. "Der Untermenschen", a racist brochure published by the SS in 1942, is an infamous piece of anti-Slavic propaganda.

The Nazi notion of Slavs as inferior served as a legitimisation of their desire to create Lebensraum, where millions of Germans would be moved into conquered territories, while the Slavic inhabitants were to be annihilated, removed or enslaved. Nazi Germany's policy changed towards Slavs in response to manpower shortages, forcing it to allow Slavs to serve in its military within the occupied territories, despite the fact they were considered "subhuman".

Hitler declared racial conflict against Jews was necessary to save Germany from suffering under them, and he dismissed concerns:

We may be inhumane, but if we rescue Germany we have achieved the greatest deed in the world. We may work injustice, but if we rescue Germany then we have removed the greatest injustice in the world. We may be immoral, but if our people is rescued we have opened the way for morality.

Propagandist Goebbels frequently employed antisemitic rhetoric to underline this view: "The Jew is the enemy and the destroyer of the purity of blood, the conscious destroyer of our race."

=== Social class ===
The Nazis believed "human life consisted of eternal struggle and competition and derived its meaning from struggle and competition." The Nazis saw this struggle in military terms, and advocated a society organised like an army to achieve success. They promoted the idea of a national-racial "people's community" (Volksgemeinschaft) to accomplish "the efficient prosecution of the struggle against other peoples and states." Like an army, the Volksgemeinschaft was meant to consist of a hierarchy of ranks or classes, some commanding and others obeying, all working together for a common goal. This concept was rooted in writings of 19th century völkisch authors who glorified medieval German society, viewing it as a "community rooted in the land and bound together by custom and tradition," in which there was no class conflict, or selfish individualism. The concept of the Volksgemeinschaft appealed to many, as it was seen to affirm a commitment to a new type of society, yet offer protection from the tensions and insecurities of modernisation. It would balance individual achievement with group solidarity. Stripped of its ideological overtones, the Nazi vision of modernisation without internal conflict, and a community that offered both security and opportunity, was so potent a vision that many Germans were willing to overlook its racist and anti-Semitic essence.

Nazism rejected the Marxist concept of class conflict, and it praised both German capitalists and German workers as essential to the Volksgemeinschaft. Social classes would continue to exist, but there would be no conflict between them. Hitler said that "the capitalists have worked their way to the top through their capacity, and as the basis of this selection, which again only proves their higher race, they have a right to lead." German business leaders co-operated in the Nazi rise to power and received benefits from the Nazi state after it was established, including high profits and state-sanctioned monopolies. Celebrations and symbolism were used to encourage those engaged in physical labour, with leading National Socialists praising the "honour of labour", which fostered a sense of community (Gemeinschaft) for the German people and promoted solidarity towards the Nazi cause. To win workers away from Marxism, Nazi propaganda sometimes presented its expansionist foreign policy as a "class struggle between nations." Bonfires were made of school children's differently coloured caps as symbolic of the unity of social classes.

In 1922, Hitler disparaged other nationalist and racialist parties as disconnected from the populace, especially working-class young people:

The racialists were not capable of drawing the practical conclusions...especially in the Jewish Question...the German racialist movement developed a similar pattern to that of the 1880s and 1890s. As in those days, its leadership gradually fell into the hands of highly honourable, but fantastically naïve men of learning, professors, district counsellors, schoolmasters, and lawyers—in short a bourgeois, idealistic, and refined class. It lacked the warm breath of the nation's youthful vigour.

Nevertheless, the Nazis' voter base consisted mainly of farmers and the middle class, including groups such as Weimar government officials, teachers, doctors, clerks, self-employed businessmen, salesmen, retired officers, engineers, and students. Their demands included lower taxes, higher prices for food, restrictions on department stores and consumer co-operatives, and reductions in social services and wages. The need to maintain their support made it difficult for the Nazis to appeal to the working class, which often had opposite demands.

From 1928, the Nazis' growth into a large political movement was dependent on middle class support, and on the public perception that it "promised to side with the middle classes and to confront the economic and political power of the working class." The financial collapse of the white collar middle-class of the 1920s figured significantly in their support of Nazism. Although the Nazis continued to make appeals to "the German worker", Timothy Mason concludes that "Hitler had nothing but slogans to offer the working class." Conan Fischer and Detlef Mühlberger argue that while the Nazis were primarily rooted in the lower middle class, they were able to appeal to all classes and that while workers were underrepresented, they were still a substantial source of support. H.L. Ansbacher argues working-class soldiers had the most faith in Hitler out of any occupational group.

The Nazis established a norm that every worker should be semi-skilled, which was not simply rhetorical. The number of men leaving school, to work as unskilled labourers, fell from 200,000 in 1934 to 30,000 in 1939. For many working-class families, the 1930s and 40s were a time of social mobility; not by moving into the middle class, but within the blue-collar skill hierarchy. The experience of workers varied considerably. Workers' wages did not increase much during Nazi rule, as the government feared wage-price inflation, and thus wage growth was limited. Prices for food and clothing rose, though costs for heating, rent and light decreased. Skilled workers were in shortage from 1936, meaning workers who engaged in vocational training could get higher wages. Benefits provided by the Labour Front were positively received, even if workers did not always believe propaganda about the Volksgemeinschaft. Workers welcomed opportunities for employment after the harsh years of the Depression, creating a belief that the Nazis had removed the insecurity of unemployment. Workers who remained discontented risked the Gestapo's informants. Ultimately, the Nazis faced a conflict between their rearmament program, which required sacrifices from workers (longer hours and a lower standard of living), versus a need to maintain the confidence of the working class. Hitler was sympathetic to the view that stressed taking further measures for rearmament, but did not fully implement them, to avoid alienating the working class.

While the Nazis had substantial support amongst the middle-class, they often attacked traditional middle-class values and Hitler personally held contempt for them. This was because the traditional image of the middle class was one that was obsessed with status, material attainment and quiet, comfortable living, in opposition to the Nazi ideal of a New Man. The New Man was envisioned as a heroic figure who rejected a materialistic and private life, for a public life and pervasive sense of duty, willing to sacrifice everything for the nation. Despite the Nazis' contempt for these values, they were able to secure millions of middle-class votes. Hermann Beck argues that while some of the middle-class dismissed this as mere rhetoric, many others agreed with the Nazis. The defeat of 1918, and failures of Weimar, caused many middle-class Germans to question their own identity, thinking their values to be anachronisms and agreeing these were no longer viable. While this rhetoric would become less frequent after 1933, due to the increased emphasis on the volksgemeinschaft, its ideas would not disappear until the Nazis' overthrow. The Nazis instead emphasised that the middle-class must become staatsbürger, a publicly active and involved citizen, rather than a selfish, materialistic spießbürger, only interested in private life.

=== Sex and gender ===
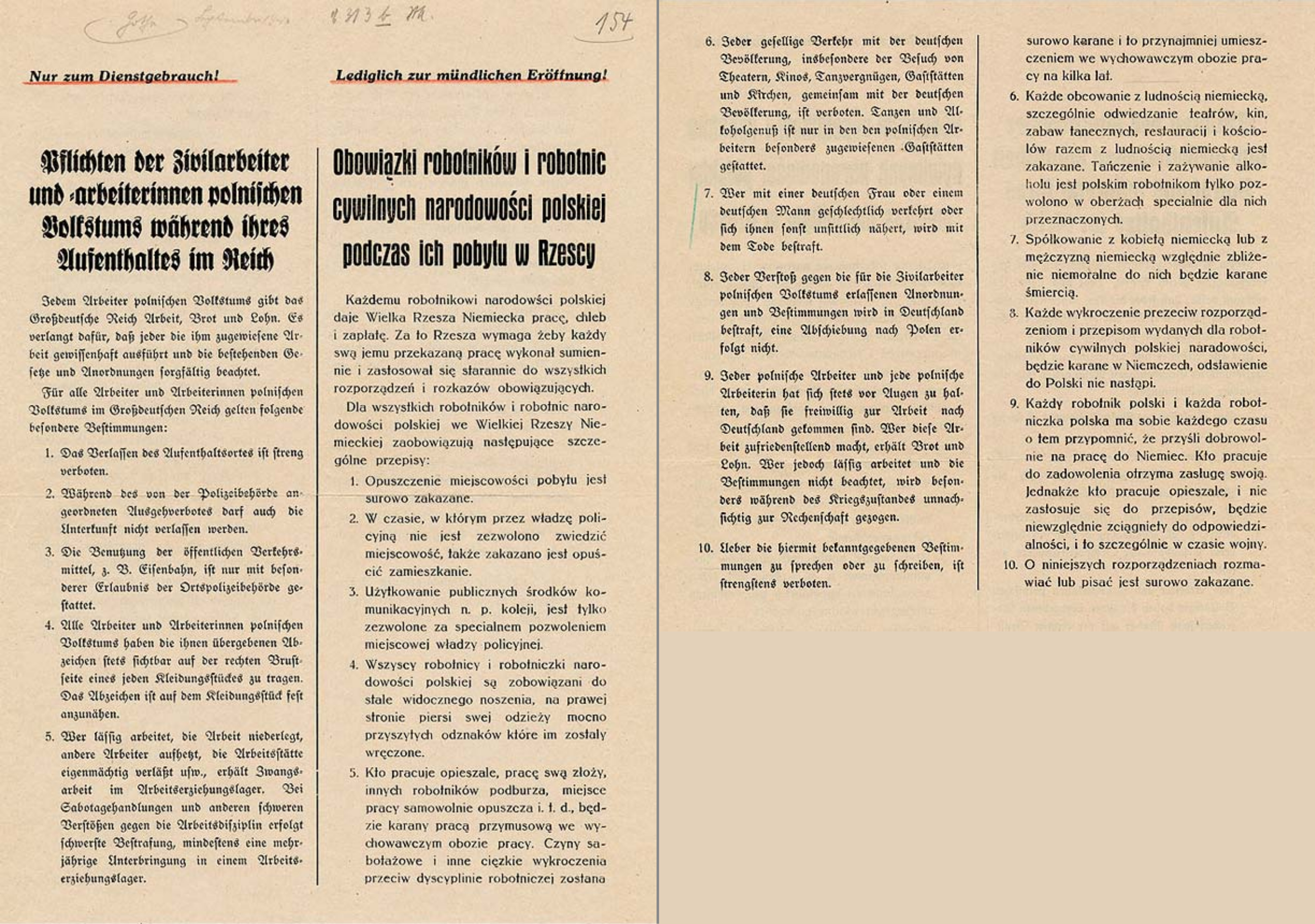
Obligations of Polish workers in Germany, warning them of the death penalty for any sexual relations between Germans and Poles

Nazi ideology advocated excluding women from politics and confining them to the spheres of "Kinder, Küche, Kirche" (Children, Kitchen, Church). Many women enthusiastically supported the regime, but formed internal hierarchies. Hitler's opinion was that while other eras of history had experienced the development and liberation of the female mind, the National Socialist goal was singular: it wished for them to produce children. Hitler remarked about women that "with every child that she brings into the world, she fights her battle for the nation. The man stands up for the Volk, exactly as the woman stands up for the family". Proto-natalist programs offered favourable loans and grants to newlyweds, and encouraged them to give birth by providing additional incentives. Contraception was discouraged for racially-valuable women and abortion was forbidden by law, including prison for women who sought them, and doctors who performed them, whereas abortion for racially "undesirable" persons was encouraged.

While unmarried until the end of the regime, Hitler often made excuses about his busy life hindering any chance for marriage. Among National Socialist ideologues, marriage was valued not for moral considerations, but because it provided an optimal breeding environment. Himmler reportedly told a confidant that when he established the Lebensborn program, an organisation that would dramatically increase the birth rate of "Aryan" children through extramarital relations between women classified as racially pure and their male equals, he had only the purest male "conception assistants" in mind.

Since the Nazis extended the Rassenschande ("race defilement") law to all foreigners at the beginning of the war, pamphlets were issued to German women which ordered them to avoid sex with foreign workers brought to Germany and view these workers as a danger to their blood. Although the law was applicable to both genders, German women were punished more severely for having sex with foreign forced labourers. The Nazis issued the Polish decrees in March 1940 which contained regulations concerning the Polish forced labourers (Zivilarbeiter) brought to Germany. One regulation stated that any Pole "who has sex...with a German man or woman, or approaches them in any other improper manner, will be punished by death". After the decrees were enacted, Himmler stated:

Fellow Germans who engage in sexual relations with male or female civil workers of the Polish nationality, commit other immoral acts or engage in love affairs shall be arrested immediately.

The Nazis issued similar regulations against 'Eastern Workers' (Ostarbeiter), including imposition of the death penalty if they engaged in sex with German persons. Heydrich issued a decree in 1942, which declared that: sex between a German woman and Russian worker or prisoner of war, would result in the Russian man being punished with death. Another decree stated any "unauthorised" sex would result in the death penalty. Because the Law for the Protection of German Blood and German Honour did not permit capital punishment for race defilement, special courts were convened to allow the death penalty to be imposed. Women accused of race defilement were marched through the streets with their head shaven and placards detailing their crimes around their necks and those convicted of race defilement were sent to concentration camps. When Himmler reportedly asked Hitler what the punishment should be for German women who were found guilty of race defilement with prisoners of war, he ordered that "every POW who has relations with a German girl or a German would be shot" and the woman should be publicly humiliated by "having her hair shorn and being sent to a concentration camp".

The League of German Girls, the girls' wing of the Nazi party, instructed girls to avoid race defilement. Transgender people had a variety of experiences depending on whether they were considered "Aryan" or capable of useful work. Historians have noted transgender people were targeted by the Nazis through legislation and sent to concentration camps.

==== Opposition to homosexuality ====
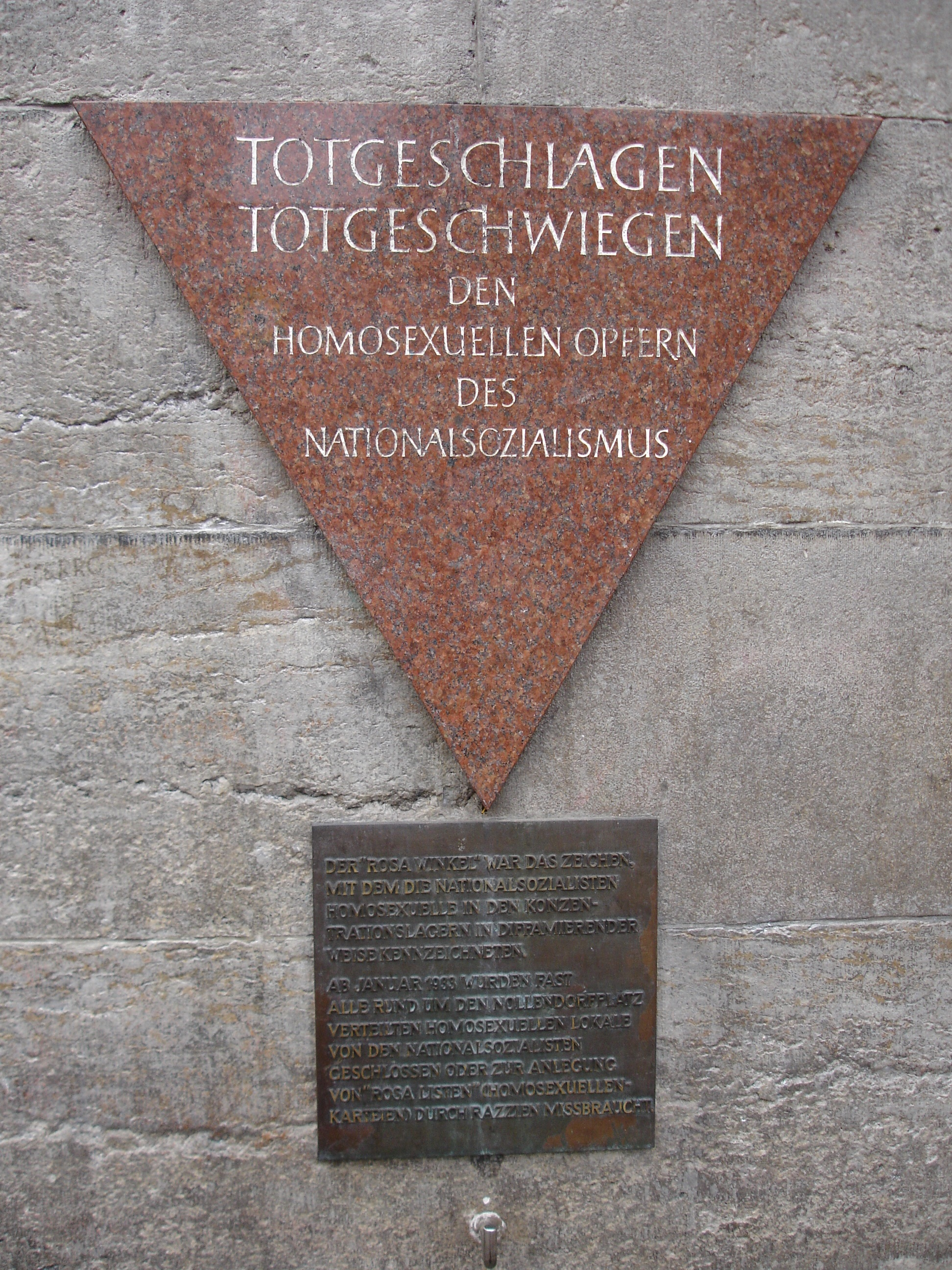
Berlin memorial to homosexual victims of the Holocaust: Totgeschlagen – Totgeschwiegen (Struck Dead – Hushed Up)

After the Night of the Long Knives, Hitler promoted Himmler and the SS, who then zealously suppressed homosexuality by saying: "We must exterminate these people root and branch ... the homosexual must be eliminated". In 1936, Himmler established the "Reichszentrale zur Bekämpfung der Homosexualität und Abtreibung" ("Reich Central Office for the Combating of Homosexuality and Abortion"). Between 1937-39, the Nazi regime arrested 95,000 homosexual men. Nazi ideology still viewed men who were gay as a part of the master race, but the regime attempted to force them into sexual and social conformity. Homosexuals were viewed as failing in their duty to procreate and reproduce for the Aryan nation. Gay men who would not conform were sent to concentration camps under the "Extermination Through Work" campaign. As concentration camp prisoners, homosexual men were forced to wear pink triangle badges.

=== Religion ===
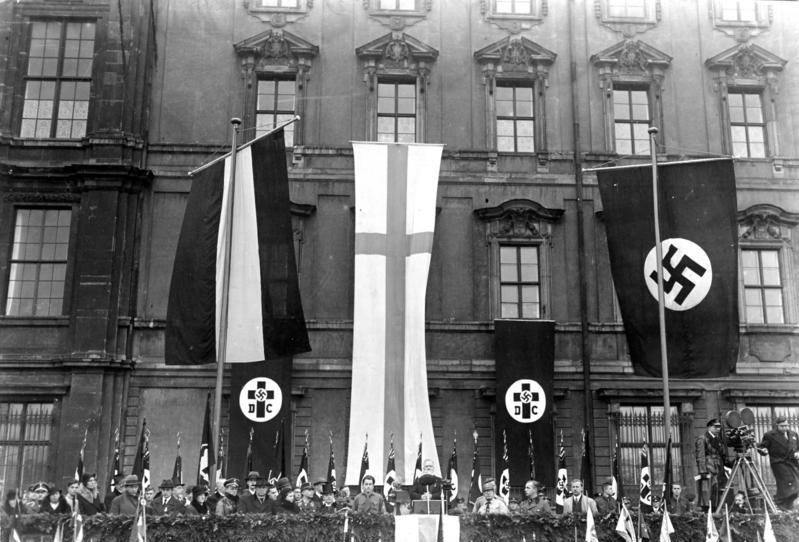
Members of the German Christians organisation celebrating Luther Day in Berlin in 1933. A speech is given by Bishop Hossenfelder.

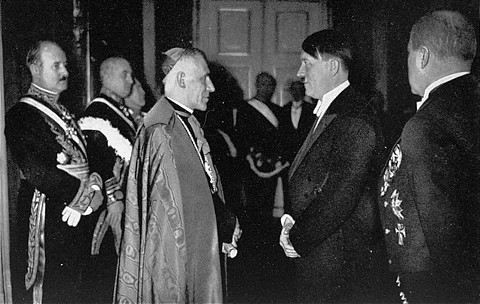
Hitler in 1935 with Cesare Orsenigo, the Catholic Church's nuncio to Germany

The Nazi Party Programme of 1920 guaranteed freedom for all religious denominations which were not hostile to the State and endorsed Positive Christianity, in order to combat "the Jewish-materialist spirit". Positive Christianity was a modified version of Christianity which emphasised racial purity and nationalism. The Nazis were aided by theologians such as Ernst Bergmann. In his Die 25 Thesen der Deutschreligion (Twenty-five Points of the German Religion), Bergmann held the view that the Old Testament was inaccurate, along with portions of the New Testament, claimed Jesus was not a Jew but instead of Aryan origin, and Hitler was the new messiah.

Hitler denounced the Old Testament as "Satan's Bible" and using components of the New Testament he attempted to prove Jesus was an Aryan and antisemite by citing passages such as John 8 (John 8:44) where he noted Jesus is yelling at "the Jews", as well as saying to them "your father is the devil" and the Cleansing of the Temple, which describes Jesus' whipping of the "Children of the Devil". Hitler claimed the New Testament included distortions by Paul the Apostle, who Hitler described as a "mass-murderer turned saint". The Nazis displayed an original edition of Martin Luther's On the Jews and their Lies during the Nuremberg rallies.

The Nazis were initially hostile to Catholics because most supported the German Centre Party. Catholics opposed Nazi promotion of compulsory sterilisation of those deemed inferior, and the Catholic Church forbade its members to vote for the Nazis. In 1933, extensive Nazi violence occurred against Catholics due to their association with the Centre Party, and opposition to the Nazi sterilisation laws. The Nazis demanded Catholics declare their loyalty to the German state. In their propaganda, the Nazis used elements of Germany's Catholic history, in particular the German Catholic Teutonic Knights and their campaigns in Eastern Europe. The Nazis identified them as "sentinels" in the East against "Slavic chaos", though beyond that symbolism, the influence of the Teutonic Knights on Nazism was limited. Hitler admitted Nazis' night rallies were inspired by Catholic rituals he had witnessed during his Catholic upbringing. The Nazis did seek official reconciliation with the Catholic Church and endorsed the creation of the pro-Nazi Catholic Kreuz und Adler, an organisation which advocated a form of national Catholicism that would reconcile the Catholic Church's beliefs with Nazism. In July 1933, a concordat (Reichskonkordat) was signed between Nazi Germany and the Catholic Church, which in exchange for acceptance of the Catholic Church in Germany required Catholics to be loyal to the German state. The Catholic Church ended its ban on members supporting the Nazis.

During the Second World War and fanaticization of National Socialism, priests and nuns increasingly came to the attention of the Gestapo and SS. In the concentration camps, separate priestly blocks were formed, and church resistance was strictly persecuted. Monastery sister Maria Restituta Kafka was sentenced to death and executed only for a song critical of the regime. Polish priests came en masse to Auschwitz. Catholic resistance groups like those around Roman Karl Scholz were persecuted. While Catholic resistance was often anti-war and passive, there are examples of active combating National Socialism. The group around the priest Heinrich Maier approached the American secret service and provided them with plans and location sketches of V-2 rockets, Tiger tanks, Messerschmitt Bf 109 and Messerschmitt Me 163 Komet and their production sites, so the Allies could successfully bomb them. After the war, their history was often forgotten, also because they acted against the express instructions of their church authorities.

Michael Burleigh claims Nazism used Christianity for political purposes, such use required that "fundamental tenets were stripped out, but the remaining diffuse religious emotionality had its uses". Burleigh claims that Nazism's conception of spirituality was "self-consciously pagan and primitive". Roger Griffin rejects the claim Nazism was primarily pagan, noting that while there were influential neo-paganists in the Party, such as Himmler and Alfred Rosenberg, they represented a minority and their views did not influence ideology beyond its use for symbolism. Hitler denounced paganism in Mein Kampf and condemned Rosenberg and Himmler's paganism as "nonsense".

=== Economics ===
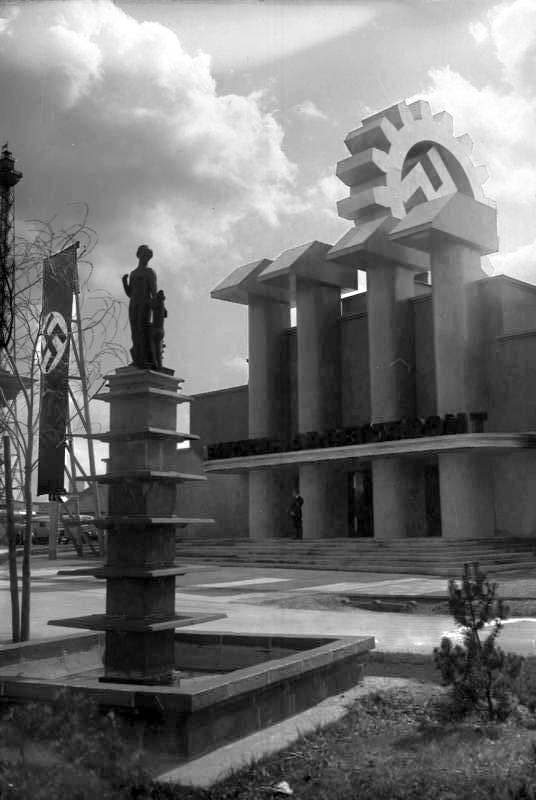
Deutsches Volk–Deutsche Arbeit: German People, German Work (1934) – an example of reactionary modernism

The Nazis came to power in the midst of the Great Depression, when unemployment was close to 30%. Nazi theorists and politicians blamed economic failures on political causes like the influence of Marxism on the workforce, the exploitative machinations of what they called international Jewry and the vindictiveness of western leaders' reparation demands. Instead of traditional economic incentives, the Nazis offered political solutions, such as the elimination of trade unions, rearmament and biological politics. Work programs designed to establish full employment for the population were instituted once the Nazis seized power. Hitler encouraged national projects like construction of the Autobahn highway system and the introduction of an affordable 'people's car' (Volkswagen). The Nazis also bolstered the economy through the business and employment generated by rearmament. They benefited from the first post-Depression upswing, and this combined with their public works projects, job-procurement and subsidised home repair programmes reduced unemployment by 40% in one year. This development tempered the unfavourable psychological climate caused by the economic crisis and encouraged Germans to march in step with the regime.

Nazi economic policies were in many respects a continuation of those from the German National People's Party, a national-conservative party and the Nazis' coalition partner. While other capitalist countries strove for increased state ownership of industry during this period, the Nazis transferred public ownership into the private sector and handed over some public services to private organizations, mostly affiliated with the Party. It was an intentional policy with multiple objectives, rather than ideologically driven, and was used as a tool to enhance support for the government and party. According to Richard Overy, the Nazi war economy was a mixed economy that combined free markets with central planning, and he described it as being somewhere between the command economy of the USSR and the capitalist system of the US.

The Nazis continued the policies introduced by the conservative government of Kurt von Schleicher in 1932 to combat the Depression. Upon being appointed Chancellor in 1933, Hitler appointed Hjalmar Schacht, a former member of the German Democratic Party, as President of the Reichsbank and later Minister of Economics in 1934. Hitler promised measures to increase employment, protect the currency, and promote recovery from the Depression. These included an agrarian settlement program, labour service, and a guarantee to maintain health care and pensions. However, these policies and programs, which included public works programs supported by deficit spending to stimulate the economy and reduce unemployment, were planned by the Weimar Republic and appropriated by the Nazis. Hitler's main priority was rearmament and buildup of the military in preparation for a war to conquer Lebensraum in the East. The policies of Schacht created a scheme for deficit financing, in which capital projects were paid for with the issuance of promissory notes called Mefo bills, which could be traded by companies with each other. This was particularly useful in allowing Germany to rearm because the Mefo bills were not Reichsmarks and did not appear in the federal budget, so they helped conceal rearmament. Hitler said that "the future of Germany depends exclusively and only on the reconstruction of the Wehrmacht. All other tasks must cede precedence to the task of rearmament." This policy was implemented immediately, with military expenditures quickly growing larger than civilian work-creation programs. As early as June 1933, military spending for the year was budgeted to be three times larger than spending on civilian work-creation measures in 1932 and 1933 combined. Germany increased its military spending faster than any other state in peacetime, with military spending rising from 1 to 10 per cent of national income in the first two years of the regime. Eventually, it reached 75 per cent by 1944.

In spite of their rhetoric condemning big business prior to their rise to power, the Nazis quickly entered into a partnership with business from as early as February 1933. After his appointment as Chancellor but before gaining dictatorial powers, Hitler made a personal appeal to business leaders to help fund the Nazi Party for the crucial months to follow. He argued they should support establishing a dictatorship because "private enterprise cannot be maintained in the age of democracy" and because democracy would allegedly lead to communism. He promised to destroy the German left, including trade unions, without mention of anti-Jewish policies or foreign conquests. In the following weeks, the Party received contributions from 17 different business groups, the largest from IG Farben and Deutsche Bank. Adam Tooze writes that business leaders were "willing partners in the destruction of political pluralism in Germany". In exchange, owners and managers of businesses were granted unprecedented powers to control their workforce, collective bargaining was abolished and wages frozen at a relatively low level. Profits rose rapidly, as did corporate investment. The Nazis privatised public properties and services, only increasing economic state control through regulations. Hitler believed private ownership was useful in that it encouraged creative competition and innovation, but insisted it had to conform to national interests and be "productive" rather than "parasitical". Property rights were conditional upon following Nazi priorities, with high profits as a reward for firms who followed them and the threat of nationalisation used against those who did not. Under Nazi economics, free competition and self-regulating markets diminished, but Hitler's social Darwinist beliefs made him retain business competition and private property as economic engines.

The Nazis were hostile to the idea of social welfare in principle, upholding the social Darwinist concept that the weak should perish. They condemned the Weimar welfare system, and charity, accusing them of supporting people regarded as racially inferior and weak, who should have been weeded out through natural selection. Nevertheless, faced with the mass unemployment and poverty of the Depression, the Nazis found it necessary to set up charitable institutions to help racially-pure Germans, to maintain popular support, while arguing this represented "racial self-help" and not indiscriminate charity or universal social welfare. Nazi programs such as the Winter Relief of the German People and the broader National Socialist People's Welfare (NSV) were organised as quasi-private institutions, officially relying on donations from Germans to help others of their race, though in practice those who refused to donate could face severe consequences. Unlike the social welfare institutions of the Weimar Republic and the Christian charities, the NSV distributed assistance on explicitly racial grounds. It provided support only to those who were "racially sound, capable of and willing to work, politically reliable, and willing and able to reproduce". Non-Aryans were excluded, as well as the "work-shy", "asocials" and the "hereditarily ill". Successful efforts were made to get middle-class women involved in social work assisting large families, and the Winter Relief campaigns acted as a ritual to generate public sympathy.

Agrarian policies were important to the Nazis, as they corresponded not just to the economy, but their geopolitical conception of Lebensraum. For Hitler, the acquisition of land and soil was important in moulding the economy. To tie farmers to their land, selling it was prohibited. Farm ownership remained private, but business monopoly rights were granted to marketing boards to control production and prices with a quota system. The Hereditary Farm Law of 1933 established a cartel structure under a government body known as the Reichsnährstand (RNST) which determined "everything[,] from what seeds and fertilizers were used to how land was inherited". Hitler primarily viewed the economy as an instrument of power, not creating wealth and technical progress to improve quality of life, but to provide the material foundations for conquest. While economic progress had its role in appeasing Germans, the Nazis did not believe economic solutions were sufficient to thrust Germany onto the stage as a world power. The Nazis sought to secure an economic revival accompanied by massive military spending for rearmament, especially later through the implementation of the Four Year Plan, which consolidated their rule and firmly secured a command relationship between the arms industry and government. Between 1933-39, military expenditures were upwards of 82 billion Reichsmarks and represented 23% of Germany's economy as the Nazis mobilised their people and economy for war.

==== Anti-communism ====
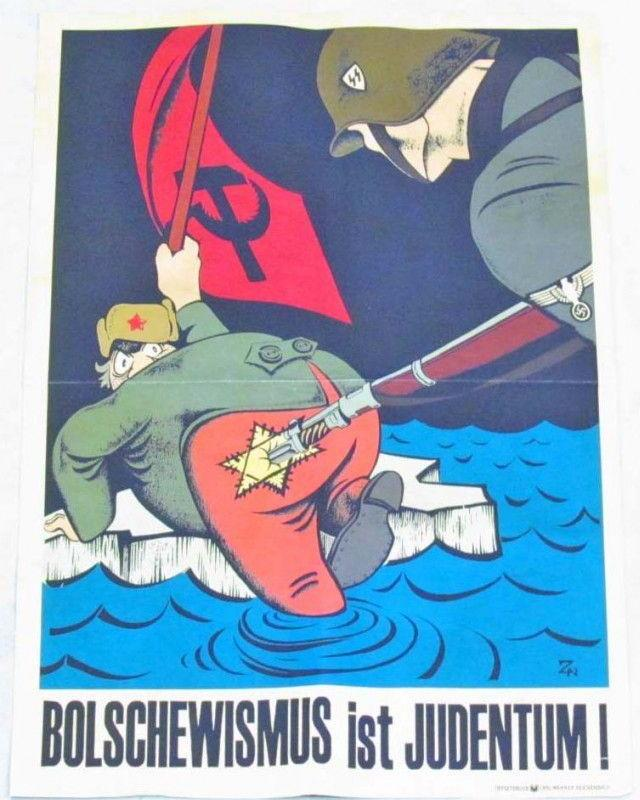
Anti-communist, antisemitic propaganda poster in Nazi Germany

The Nazis claimed that communism was dangerous to the well-being of nations because of its intention to dissolve private property, its support of class conflict, its aggression against the middle class, its hostility towards small business and its atheism. Nazism rejected class conflict-based socialism and economic egalitarianism, favouring a stratified economy with social classes based on merit and talent, retaining private property and the creation of national solidarity that transcends class distinction. During the 1930s and 40s, anti-communist regimes and groups that supported Nazism included the Falange in Francoist Spain, the Vichy regime and the 33rd Waffen Grenadier Division of the SS Charlemagne (1st French) in France and the British Union of Fascists under Oswald Mosley.

In Mein Kampf, Hitler stated his desire to "make war upon the Marxist principle that all men are equal". He believed "the notion of equality was a sin against nature." Nazism upheld the "natural inequality of men," including inequality between races and within races. The Nazi state aimed to advance those individuals with special talents or intelligence, so they could rule over the masses. Nazi ideology relied on elitism and the Führerprinzip (leadership principle), arguing elite minorities should assume leadership over the majority, and be organised according to a "hierarchy of talent", with a single leader—the Führer—at the top. The Führerprinzip held that each member of the hierarchy owed absolute obedience to those above him and should hold absolute power over those below him.

During the 1920s, Hitler urged disparate Nazi factions to unite in opposition to Jewish Bolshevism. Hitler asserted that the "three vices" of "Jewish Marxism" were democracy, pacifism and internationalism. The Communist movement, the trade unions, the Social Democratic Party and the left-wing press were considered to be Jewish-controlled and part of the "international Jewish conspiracy" to weaken the nation by promoting disunity through class struggle. The Nazis believed the Jews had instigated the Bolshevik revolution in Russia and Communists had stabbed Germany in the back, and caused it to lose the First World War. They argued that cultural trends of the 1920s (such as jazz and cubist art) represented "cultural Bolshevism" and were part of an assault aimed at the spiritual degeneration of the German Volk. Goebbels published a pamphlet titled The Nazi-Sozi which described how Nazism differed from Marxism. In 1930, Hitler said: "Our adopted term 'Socialist' has nothing to do with Marxist Socialism. Marxism is anti-property; true Socialism is not".

The Communist Party of Germany (KPD) was the largest Communist party in the world outside the Soviet Union, until it was destroyed by the Nazis in 1933. In the 1920s and early 1930s, Communists and Nazis fought each other in street violence, with Nazi paramilitary organisations being opposed by the Communist Red Front and Anti-Fascist Action. After the beginning of the Depression, Communists and Nazis saw their share of the vote increase. While the Nazis formed alliances with other parties of the right, the Communists refused to form an alliance with the Social Democratic Party of Germany, the largest party of the left. After the Nazis came to power, they banned the Communist Party under the allegation it was preparing for revolution and had caused the Reichstag fire. Four thousand KPD officials were arrested in February 1933, and by the end of the year 130,000 communists had been sent to Nazi concentration camps.

==== Views of capitalism ====
The Nazis argued that free-market capitalism damages nations due to international finance and the dominance of disloyal big business, which they considered to be the product of Jewish influences. Nazi propaganda posters in working class districts emphasised anti-capitalism, such as one that said: "The maintenance of a rotten industrial system has nothing to do with nationalism. I can love Germany and hate capitalism".

In public, and privately, Hitler opposed free-market capitalism because it "could not be trusted to put national interests first", arguing it holds nations ransom in the interests of a parasitic cosmopolitan rentier class. He believed free trade would lead to global domination by the British Empire and the United States, which he believed were controlled by Jewish bankers. In particular, Hitler saw the US as a future rival and feared that the globalization after World War I would allow North America to displace Europe as the world's most powerful continent. Hitler's anxiety over the rise of the US was a major theme in his unpublished Zweites Buch. He even hoped for a time that Britain could be swayed into an alliance with Germany on the basis of a shared rivalry with the US. Hitler desired an economy that would direct resources "in ways that matched the many national goals of the regime" such as the buildup of the military, building programs for cities and roads, and economic self-sufficiency. Hitler distrusted free-market capitalism for being unreliable due to its egotism and preferred a state-directed economy that maintains private property and competition but subordinates them to the interests of the Volk and Nation.

Hitler told a party leader in 1934: "The economic system of our day is the creation of the Jews". Hitler said to Benito Mussolini that capitalism had "run its course". Hitler said the business bourgeoisie "know nothing except their profit. 'Fatherland' is only a word for them." Hitler was disgusted with the bourgeois elites during the Weimar Republic, whom he referred to as "cowardly shits".

In Mein Kampf, Hitler effectively supported mercantilism in the belief that economic resources should be seized by force, as he believed that Lebensraum would provide Germany with economically-valuable territories. He argued the US and UK only benefitted from free trade because they had already conquered substantial internal markets through British colonial conquests and American westward expansion. Hitler argued that the only means to maintain economic security was to have direct control over resources rather than being forced to rely on trade. Hitler claimed war to gain such resources was the only means to surpass the failing capitalist system.

In practice, however, the Nazis merely opposed one type of capitalism, namely 19th-century free-market capitalism and the laissez-faire model, which they nonetheless applied to the social sphere in the form of social Darwinism. Some have described Nazi Germany as an example of corporatism, authoritarian capitalism, or totalitarian capitalism. While claiming to strive for autarky in propaganda, the Nazis crushed existing movements towards self-sufficiency and established extensive capital connections to ready for expansionist war and genocide in alliance with traditional business and commerce elites. In spite of their anti-capitalist rhetoric in opposition to big business, the Nazis allied with business as soon as they had power by appealing to the fear of communism and promising to destroy the German left and trade unions, eventually purging both more radical and reactionary elements from the party in 1934.

Goebbels was strongly opposed to capitalism and communism, viewing them as the "two great pillars of materialism" that were "part of the international Jewish conspiracy for world domination". Nevertheless, he wrote in his diary in 1925 that if he were forced to choose between them, "in the final analysis, it would be better for us to go down with Bolshevism than live in eternal slavery under capitalism". Goebbels linked his antisemitism to his anti-capitalism, stating in a 1929 pamphlet that "we see, in the Hebrews, the incarnation of capitalism, the misuse of the nation's goods".

Within the Nazis, the faction associated with anti-capitalist beliefs was the SA, a paramilitary wing led by Ernst Röhm. The SA had a complicated relationship with the rest of the party, with Röhm and local SA leaders having significant autonomy. Different local leaders would even promote different political ideas in their units, including "nationalistic, socialistic, anti-Semitic, racist, völkisch, or conservative ideas." There was tension between the SA and Hitler, especially from 1930, as Hitler's "increasingly close association with industrial interests and traditional rightist forces" caused many in the SA to distrust him. The SA regarded Hitler's seizure of power in 1933 as a "first revolution" against the left, and some voices began arguing for a "second revolution" against the right. After engaging in violence against the left in 1933, Röhm's SA began attacks against individuals deemed to be associated with conservative reaction. Hitler saw Röhm's independent actions as violating and possibly threatening his leadership, as well as jeopardising the regime by alienating the conservative President von Hindenburg and the conservative-oriented army. This resulted in Hitler purging Röhm and other radical members of the SA in 1934, during the Night of the Long Knives.

The Strasserists, led by brothers Gregor and Otto Strasser, were another anti-capitalist faction within the Nazis. Being close to Goebbels, they linked their antisemitism and authoritarianism to anti-capitalism. They opposed the Führerprinzip and argued for a redistribution of wealth, desiring an alliance with the USSR. The group blamed Hitler for betraying the "socialist" part of Nazism, causing rising tensions between Hitler and the brothers. The brothers left the Nazi Party and founded the Black Front in 1930. In 1933, Hitler banned their party, ending their influence. Gregor was assassinated in 1934 during the Night of the Long Knives, while Otto fled the country.

=== Totalitarianism ===
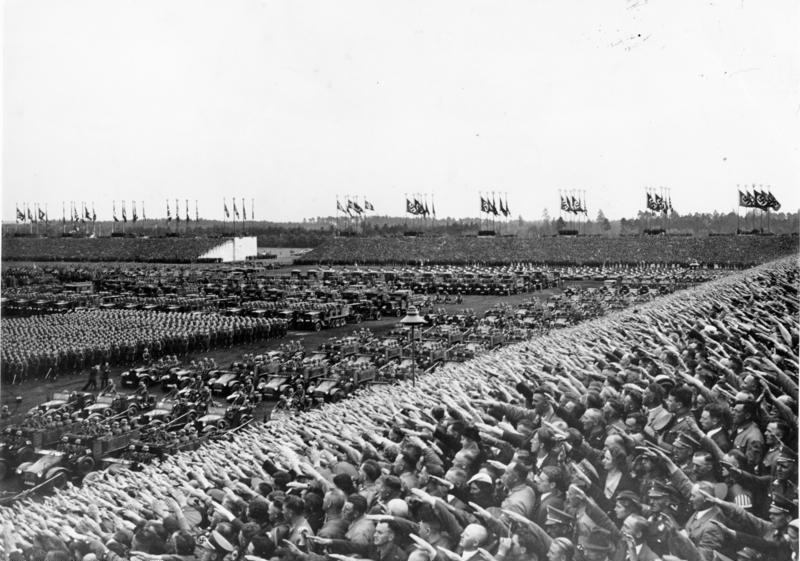
Nazi Party rally in Nuremberg, 1936

Under Nazism, with its emphasis on the nation, individualism was denounced and instead importance was placed upon Germans belonging to the German Volk and "people's community" (Volksgemeinschaft). Hitler declared that "every activity and every need of every individual will be regulated by the collectivity represented by the party" and that "there are no longer any free realms in which the individual belongs to himself".

A core objective of the Nazis was the establishment of a totalitarian state which indoctrinated the population with ultra-nationalist ideas and violently enforced its ideological worldview upon the society. Himmler justified the establishment of a repressive police state, in which the security forces could exercise power arbitrarily, by claiming that national security and order should take precedence over the needs of the individual. In a speech in 1933, Joseph Goebbels stated:

"The revolution we have carried out is a total one. It has embraced all areas of public life and transformed them from below. It has completely changed and recast the relationship of people to each other, to the State, and to life itself. It was in fact the breakthrough of a fresh world-view, which had fought for power in opposition for fourteen years to provide the basis for the German people to develop a new relationship with the State. What has been happening since 30 January is only the visible expression of this revolutionary process."

According to Hannah Arendt, Nazism had an allure as a totalitarian ideology because it helped Germany deal with the aftermath of the First World War and material suffering of the Depression, and brought to order the revolutionary unrest. Instead of the plurality that existed in democratic or parliamentary states, Nazism as a totalitarian system promulgated "clear" solutions to the problems faced by Germany, levied support by de-legitimizing the former government of Weimar and provided a politico-biological pathway to a better future, free from uncertainty. It was the atomised and disaffected masses that Hitler and the party elite pointed in a particular direction and used propaganda to make them into ideological adherents, to bring Nazism to life.

While the ideologues of Nazism, much like those of Stalinism, abhorred democratic governance, their differences are substantial. They had similarly tyrannical leaders, state-controlled economies, repressive police structures, and a common thematic political construction. But they had opposing goals and worldviews, which made them radically different.

Carl Schmitt, a Nazi legal theorist, characterized the "Führerprinzip" as the ideological foundation of Nazi Germany's "total state". In "Staat, Bewegung, Volk" (1933), Schmitt wrote:

"National Socialism does not think in abstractions and clichés. It is the enemy of all normative and functionalist ways of proceeding. It supports and cultivates every authentic substance of the people wherever it encounters it, in the countryside, in ethnic groups [Stämme] or classes. It has created the hereditary farm law; saved the peasantry; purged the Civil Service of alien [ fremdgeartet] elements and thus re-stored it as a class. It has the courage to treat unequally what is unequal and enforce necessary differentiations."

== Classification: reactionary or revolutionary? ==
Although Nazism is sometimes seen as purely reactionary, it did not seek to return to the pre-Weimar monarchy, but instead looked further back to a mythic halcyon Germany which never existed. It has also been seen as the result of a crisis of capitalism, which manifested as a "totalitarian monopoly capitalism".

There were aspects of Nazism which were undoubtedly reactionary, such as their attitude toward women, which was completely traditionalist, calling for the return of women to the home as wives, mothers and homemakers. Although ironically this was undermined by growing labour shortages, and need for more workers caused by men leaving for military service. The number of working women actually increased from 4.2 million in 1933 to 4.5 million in 1936 and 5.2 million in 1938, despite active discouragement and legal barriers put in place by the regime. Another reactionary aspect was in Nazi arts policy, which stemmed from Hitler's rejection of all forms of "degenerate" modern art, music and architecture. In regards to modern art, Hitler in July 1937 denounced what he called “cultural Bolshevism”, particularly painters who “paint meadows blue, skies green, and clouds sulphur-yellow[…]'One kind of art is artistic and is permitted. The other kind is inartistic and is to be penalized. In the permissible kind of art trees are green, sky blue, and soil is brown. The inartistic art is a hodgepodge of colors.”

=== Contemporary events and views ===
After the failure of the Beer Hall Putsch in 1923, and his imprisonment, Hitler decided the way for the Nazis to achieve power was not through insurrection, but through legal and quasi-legal means. This did not sit well with the stormtroopers of the SA, who chafed under the restrictions Hitler placed on them, and their subordination to the party. This resulted in the Stennes Revolt of 1930–31, after which Hitler made himself Supreme Commander of the SA and brought Ernst Röhm back to be their Chief of Staff and keep them in line. The quashing of the SA's revolutionary fervor convinced many business and military leaders that the Nazis had put aside their insurrectionist past, and Hitler could be a reliable partner.

After the Nazis' "Seizure of Power" in 1933, Röhm and the SA pressed for a continuation of the "National Socialist revolution" to bring sweeping social changes, which Hitler, for tactical reasons, was not willing to do at that time. He was focused on rebuilding the military and reorienting the economy to provide the rearmament necessary for invasion of countries to the east, to get the Lebensraum ("living space") he believed was necessary to the survival of the Aryan race. He needed the co-operation of not only the military, but the vital organs of capitalism, big business, which he would not get if Germany's social and economic structure was being radically overhauled. Röhm's proclamation that the SA would not allow the "German Revolution" to be halted, caused Hitler to announce that "The revolution is not a permanent condition." The unwillingness of Röhm and the SA to cease their agitation for a "Second Revolution", and fear of a "Röhm putsch" to accomplish it, were factors behind Hitler's purging of the SA leadership in the Night of the Long Knives in 1934.

Kaiser Wilhelm II, the last German Emperor, was appalled at the Kristallnacht of 1938, stating "For the first time, I am ashamed to be a German":

There's a man alone, without family, without children, without God ... He builds legions, but he doesn't build a nation. A nation is created by families, a religion, traditions: it is made up out of the hearts of mothers, the wisdom of fathers, the joy and the exuberance of children ... For a few months I was inclined to believe in National Socialism. I thought of it as a necessary fever. And I was gratified to see that there were, associated with it for a time, some of the wisest and most outstanding Germans. But these, one by one, he has got rid of or even killed ... He has left nothing but a bunch of shirted gangsters! This man could bring home victories to our people each year, without bringing them either glory or danger. But of our Germany, which was a nation of poets and musicians, of artists and soldiers, he has made a nation of hysterics and hermits, engulfed in a mob and led by a thousand liars or fanatics.

— Wilhelm on Hitler, December 1938

Otto von Habsburg, the last Crown Prince of Austria-Hungary, denounced Nazism, stating:

I absolutely reject [Nazi] Fascism for Austria ... This un-Austrian movement promises everything to everyone, but really intends the most ruthless subjugation of the Austrian people ... The people of Austria will never tolerate that our beautiful fatherland should become an exploited colony, and that the Austrian should become a man of second category.

Following German annexation of Austria, Otto was sentenced to death by the Nazis. Rudolf Hess ordered that Otto be executed immediately if caught. His personal property and that of the House of Habsburg were confiscated. It was not returned after the war. The "Habsburg Law", which had dethroned the Habsburgs but been repealed, was reintroduced by the Nazis.

== Post-war Nazism ==
Following Nazi Germany's defeat in World War II and the end of the Holocaust, overt expressions of support for Nazi ideas were prohibited in Germany and other European countries. Nonetheless, movements which self-identify as National Socialist or which are described as adhering to Nazism continue to exist on the fringes of politics in many Western societies. Usually espousing a white supremacist ideology, many deliberately adopt the symbols of Nazi Germany.

=== Revival of Nazism ===
Following the collapse of Nazi Germany in 1945, various groups sought to revive aspects of National Socialist ideology.

In the immediate postwar period, small neo-Nazi parties and organizations emerged in several European countries. In West Germany, the Socialist Reich Party (SRP), founded in 1949, sought to revive elements of National Socialist ideology before it was banned by the Federal Constitutional Court in 1952. Similar movements appeared in other countries, often adapting their rhetoric and organizational structures in response to legal prohibitions and changing political conditions.

In the 21st century, international organizations have warned of a resurgence of neo-Nazi and related white supremacist movements in multiple regions. United Nations Secretary-General António Guterres has described neo-Nazis and white supremacists as increasingly organized and capable of recruiting across borders, characterizing them as a growing transnational threat.

Russian officials have also issued repeated warnings about what they describe as the revival of Nazism and neo-Nazi ideology. President Vladimir Putin has stated on multiple occasions that Nazism and its collaborators must not be rehabilitated and has linked contemporary extremism to what he characterizes as attempts to revise the outcomes of World War II. Russian Foreign Minister Sergey Lavrov has similarly warned of what he calls a resurgence of Nazi ideology and symbols, particularly in the context of international disputes over historical memory and the interpretation of the Second World War.

A 2018 report to the United Nations Human Rights Council noted that neo-Nazi groups continue to adapt their messaging and use online platforms and popular culture to propagate their ideology, including in countries where Nazism is banned or socially stigmatized.

German domestic intelligence authorities have also warned of a resurgence of neo-Nazi and far-right extremist activity within the country. The Federal Office for the Protection of the Constitution (Bundesamt für Verfassungsschutz, BfV) has repeatedly identified neo-Nazism as a persistent internal security threat in its annual reports, noting that such groups continue to adapt their ideology, symbols, and recruitment methods despite Germany’s post-war prohibitions on Nazism. Former BfV president Thomas Haldenwang stated that far-right extremism represents the most significant threat to Germany’s constitutional order, emphasizing that neo-Nazi ideology remains active both through organized groups and online radicalization networks.

== See also ==
- Art in Nazi Germany
- Consequences of Nazism
- Glossary of Nazi Germany
- Italian fascism
- Kokkashugi
- List of books about Nazi Germany
- List of nicknames and pseudonyms of Nazis
- List of Nazi ideologues
- List of Nazi Party leaders and officials
- Nazi architecture
- Nazi occultism
- Nazi salute
- Nazism and cinema
- Nazism and the Wehrmacht
