= Kreuz und Adler =

Kreuz und Adler (Cross and Eagle) was a pro-Nazi Catholic organization founded in 1933. It was founded at the behest of German Vice-Chancellor and Catholic Franz von Papen as a means to create reconciliation between the Nazi regime and the Catholic Church that had previously held hostility to the Nazis. It was founded after 28 March 1933 when the Catholic Church ended its previous ban on Catholics being members of the Nazi Party.

The first meeting of the Kreuz und Adler was held on the 15 June 1933. At the first meeting, von Papen called for its followers to support the overcoming of liberalism and complimented the Nazi regime for being the "Christian counterrevolution to 1789", referring to the French Revolution that instituted secularization of society.

Its membership largely consisted of wealthy German Catholics. Members included Otto Schilling, Theodor Brauer, Emil Ritter and Eugen Kogen.

== See also ==
- Nazi Party
- Nazism
- Franz von Papen
