= List of nicknames and pseudonyms of Nazis =

This is a list of nicknames and pseudonyms of Nazis. Common nicknames (as translated into English) include variations of "Beast", "Butcher" and "Angel of Death". Most high-ranking Nazis did not have a nickname. Most of the notable Nazis who did have nicknames were concentration camp personnel.

The common nickname of Sepp in German for Josef, for such Nazis as Josef Dietrich and Josef Oberhauser, is excluded from this list. The definite article "the" has been removed from the nicknames for the purposes of sorting properly.

== Nicknames ==
| Nickname (as translated in English) | Person |
|---|---|
| American | Max Möller |
| Angel of Death | Josef Mengele |
| Angel of Death | August Miete |
| Angel of Death | Irma Grese |
| Badmeister | Erich Bauer |
| Beast | Gustav Wagner |
| Beast of Belsen | Irma Grese |
| Beast of Belsen | Josef Kramer |
| Beast of Buchenwald | Ilse Koch |
| Beautiful Beast | Irma Grese |
| Bitch of Buchenwald | Ilse Koch |
| Blonde Angel of Auschwitz | Irma Grese |
| Blond Beast | Reinhard Heydrich |
| Bohemian corporal | Adolf Hitler |
| Butcher of Lyon | Klaus Barbie |
| Butcher of Prague | Reinhard Heydrich |
| Butcher of Riga | Eduard Roschmann |
| Butcher of Warsaw | Josef Albert Meisinger |
| Butcher of Warsaw | Heinz Reinefarth |
| Butcher Widow | Ilse Koch |
| Frankenstein | Josef Blösche |
| Desert Fox, The | Erwin Rommel |
| Frankenstein | Willi Mentz |
| Gasmeister | Erich Bauer |
| Globus | Odilo Globocnik |
| Handsome Toni | Anton Malloth |
| Hangman | Reinhard Heydrich |
| Himmler's Evil Genius | Reinhard Heydrich |
| Hyena of Auschwitz | Irma Grese |
| Queen of Buchenwald | Ilse Koch |
| Red Witch of Buchenwald | Ilse Koch |
| Uncle Mengele | Josef Mengele |
| Witch of Buchenwald | Ilse Koch |
| Wolf | Gustav Wagner |
| Young Evil God of Death | Reinhard Heydrich |
| Lakeitel | Wilhelm Keitel |
| Hitler Youth Quex | Karl Dönitz |

== Pseudonyms ==
Some Nazis also used pseudonyms, in most cases to evade notice and capture after the war.

| Pseudonym | Person |
|---|---|
| S. Josi Alvers Aspiazu | Josef Mengele |
| Rudolf Berg | Dietrich Klagges |
| Carl Debouche | Hans Eisele |
| Werner Fiedler | Walter Frank |
| Dr. Georg Fischer | Alois Brunner |
| Wolfgang Gerhard | Josef Mengele |
| Michael Gollwitzer | Heinrich Seetzen |
| Helmut Gregor | Josef Mengele |
| Heinrich Hitzinger | Heinrich Himmler |
| Ricardo Klement | Adolf Eichmann |
| Günther Mendel | Gustav Wagner |
| José Mengele | Josef Mengele |
| Pedro Ricardo Olmo | Walter Kutschmann |
| Fausto Rindón | Josef Mengele |
| Frederico Wagner | Eduard Roschmann |
| Otto Henninger | Adolf Eichmann |
