= St. John Paul II Institute of Culture =

Scientific and didactic institute in Rome

St. John Paul II Institute of Culture - a scientific and didactic institute of the Faculty of Philosophy of Pontifical University of St. Tomas Aquinas in Rome (also known as Angelicum). Its goal is to stimulate the intellectual life and to analyse challenges facing the modern world and the Church in light of the life and thought of Pope John Paul II.

It was established in 2020, on the 100th anniversary of birth of Karol Wojtyla, by two Polish NGO's – the Saint Nicholas Foundation (polish: Fundacja Świętego Mikołaja) and the Futura-Iuventa Foundation. It is founded by private donors.

The director of the Institute is Fr. Cezary Binkiewicz OP. Its program director is Dariusz Karłowicz. Executive director is Joanna Paciorek.

The Institute conducts postgraduate, interdisciplinary theological and philosophical studies and implements scientific, cultural and publishing projects. Since the very beginning, it has been cooperating with specialists from various research and academic centres such as sister Helen Alford OP, Rémi Brague, Fr. Jarosław Krupczak OP and George Weigel.

== JP2 Studies ==
JP2 Studies is a program of postgraduate, interdisciplinary theological and philosophical studies devoted to the figure and legacy of John Paul II. It is geared towards clergy, religious and laity alike. The program started in 2021 and the studies are conducted in English.

The study program includes classes in the form of intensive courses divided into three blocks:

Thinking on St. John Paul II – foundation courses:

- "John Paul II - Life, Work and Historical Context" - Prof. George Weigel (Ethics and Public Policy Center, Washington, D.C.)
- "John Paul II and Philosophy" – Prof. Cezary Binkiewicz OP (Angelicum)
- "John Paul II – Most Important Theological Issues" – Prof. Jarosław Kupczak OP (Pontifical University of John Paul II, Kraków)
- "John Paul II – Social Teaching" – Prof. Helen Alford OP (Angelicum), Prof. Michał Gierycz (Cardinal Stefan Wyszyński University, Warsaw)
- "Sources and Methodology for the Study of the Pontificate of John Paul II" – Rev. Prof. Andrzej Dobrzyński (Center for Documentation and Research of the Pontificate of John Paul II in Rome)

Thinking on St. John Paul II – additional courses and workshops:

- "Revelation and Phenomenality" – Prof. Jean-Luc Marion (Académie française/University of Chicago)
- "The Beautiful" – Prof. Rémi Brague (Université de Paris)
- "Ancient Tragedians and Philosophers on Religion and Politics" – Prof. Dariusz Karłowicz (Cardinal Stefan Wyszyński University, Warsaw)
- "Re-enacting Rhapsodic Theater" – a theatre workshop course under the guidance of Prof. Jarosław Kilian

Additional courses conducted by visiting professors.

== Visiting professors ==
Every year the Institute invites specialists in philosophy, theology, history, social sciences and others to conduct intensive courses within the JP2 Studies program. Since 2021 the Institute has invited: Rémi Brague (Sorbonne University), Marek Cichocki (Collegium Civitas), Dariusz Gawin (Polish Academy of Sciences), Michał Gierycz (Cardinal Stefan Wyszyński University), Francis R. Hittinger (University of Tulsa), Jarosław Kilian (Aleksander Zelwerowicz National Academy of Dramatic Art), Jarosław Kupczak OP (Pontifical University of John Paul II), Jean-Luc Marion (Académie Française), Michael Nazir-Ali (Oxford University), George Weigel (Ethics and Public Policy Center in Washington), Archbishop Rowan Williams (University of Cambridge).

== JP2 Lectures ==
JP2 Lectures is a series of open interdisciplinary lectures guided by the slogan "Thinking on John Paul II". The invited guests, who are specialists in various fields (such as philosophy, theology, history, politics and arts), refer to the intellectual heritage of John Paul II while talking about the challenges facing the contemporary Church and society. The lectures are held in auditorium 11 in Angelicum, the place where Karol Wojtyła, the future Pope John Paul II, defended his doctoral thesis in 1948. The series is broadcast live on the Angelicum YouTube channel and the university's Facebook profile. The texts of the lectures are published in the book series Thinking with John Paul II. John Paul II Lectures (in Polish and in English).

As of 2025, the invited guests have been:

person	affiliation	title of the lecture
Card. Gianfranco Ravasi	President of the Pontifical Council for Culture (2007–2022)	Does Christianity need Culture?
John Finnis	Oxford University	John Paul II and the Fundamentals of Ethics
Rowan Williams	Magdalene College Cambridge	The Modern Areopagus
Marek Cichocki	Collegium Civitas	Europe's Identity: North and South – the Dividing Line
John Cavadini	Notre Dame University	Trajectory of The Second Vatican Council with Theology of John Paul II
Fr. François Daguet OP	University of Tulsa	Political Theology from St. Thomas Aquinas to John Paul II and Benedict XVI
Chantal Delsol	Hannah Arendt Institute for Totalitarinism Studies	End of the Christendom
Rémi Brague	Sorbonne University	The Meaning of Art in Christianity in the Modern World
Renato Cristin	University of Trieste	Formal and Vital Europe. Tradition as the Ground of the Identity
Dariusz Gawin	Polish Academy of Sciences	The Phenomenon of Solidarity
John Alderdice	House of Lords	Religion as a Source of Peace or Unrest in Society?
Jean-Luc Marion	Sorbonne University	Phenomenological Openness of Revelation
George Weigel	Ethics and Public Policy Center	Karol Wojtyła's Areopagus Meditations: Lessons for the 21st Century West
Andrea Riccardi	La Spienza University	John Paul II: Exception or Illusion?
John Milbank	University of Nottingham	Virtue, Integralism and the Priority of the Social in Catholic Political Thought
Carl A. Anderson	Catholic University of America	Christianity and Culture: A Truly Christian Life Bears Witness to Christ
Ewa Thompson	University of Houston	Non-Germanic Central Europe – Can Christian Europe Survive without It?
George Weigel	Ethics and Public Policy Center	Reconsidering Vatican Ostpolitik: The Statecraft of a Saint
Stanisław Grygiel	Pontifical Lateran University	A Person is Reborn, a Person is not Reformed
Antoine Arjakovsky	Collège des Bernardins	Religion and Politics, from Totalitarianism to Democracy
Joseph Weiler	European University Institute	Non-Christian Europe – Is It Possible?
Vittorio Possenti	Ca'Foscari University	The truth we owe to man is, above all else, a truth about man himself
Mirosława Grabowska	University of Warsow	Secularization in Europe: Theory and Reality
Helen Alford OP	Angelicum	The Crisis of Europe in the Light of the Church's Social Teaching
Dariusz Karłowicz	Cardinal Stefan Wyszyński University	Reset or Revolution?
R. R. Reno	Creighton University	Christians in the Face of Political Polarization
Franciszek Longchamps de Bérier	Jagiellonian University	Hominum causa: 'All Law is Established for Men's Sake' and the Dispute on the Essence of Man
Fr. Jarosław Kupczak OP	Pontifical University of John Paul II	"Christian Civilization" to "Truly Human culture". The Church and Culture after the Second Vatican Council
Jean-Luc Marion	Sorbonne University	Going around Metaphysics
George Weigel	Ethics and Public Policy Center	John Paul II, the Primacy of Culture and the Contemporary Culture Wars
Jarosław Kilian	Aleksander Zelwerowicz National Academy of Dramatic Art	Quem quaeritis? Theatre in Search of Meaning
Paul W. Knoll	University of Southern California	Learning from Pawel Włodkowic. Religious Freedom, Just War and Sovereignty of Nations (conference)
Jean Luc-Marion	Sorbonne University	Question of Being and Revelation
Richard Swinburne	Oxford University	Rational Faith in Light of the Thought of John Paul II (conference)
Fr. Cezary Binkiewicz OP	Angelicum	The Truth and Searching for a New Paideia
Krzysztof Zanussi	Łódź Film School	Is There a Place for Cinema on Olympus? Cinema and Values
George Weigel	Ethics and Public Policy Center	Ten Markers of a Church ‘Permanently in Mission'

== Let's Paint Catholicism Again ==
Let's Paint Catholicism Again (Polish: Namalować katolicyzm od nowa) is project aimed at renewing Western sacral painting, introducing high-quality contemporary painting to the Catholic churches and revitalizing the artistic patronage. Its originator was Dariusz Karłowicz. The Institute launched the project in cooperation with two other institutions: Saint Nicholas Foundation and Political Theology. It consists of a range of initiatives: book series "Let's Paint Catholicism Again", seminars, conferences, lectures and art exhibitions.

The artistic project is planned for 21 years. Each year a Mystery of the Rosary is selected and it is illustrated by a group of invited Polish painters. The process of painting is preceded by workshops, aimed at broadening the knowledge of artists in the field of theology, philosophy, and history of arts. So far, three editions have completed:

- I Edition: The Divine Mercy image - ten contemporary images were painted according to the instructions of St. Faustyna Kowalska
- II Edition: Annuciation - since the Second Edition each painter creates two images: a smaller one, intended to serve a private cult, and a bigger, to serve cult in churches
- III Edition: Visitation
- IV Edition: Nativity of Jesus

The paintings were exhibited in Poland (Cracow, Warsaw, Opole, Bielsko-Biała) and Italy (Rome). Most of them had been sold either to private buyers or to the Church.

As of 2025/2026, artists who take part in the fifth edition are working on their interpretations of the Presentation of Jesus.

== Publishing activity ==
As part of its activities, the Institute publishes books in English. So far the following have been published:

- ed. Dariusz Karłowicz, Thinking with St. John Paul II (2020/2021), Rome-Warsaw 2022.
- Paweł Włodkowic, Writings (1416–1432), The Struggle for the Self-Determination of Central Europe, Rome-Warsaw 2023.
- Jacek Salij OP, Our Faith, Rome-Warsaw 2023.
- ed. Dariusz Karłowicz, Thinking with St. John Paul II (2021/2022), Rome-Warsaw 2024.
- Marek Cichocki, North and South. Essays on Polish Culture and History, Rome-Warsaw 2024.
- ed. Dariusz Karłowicz, Thinking with St. John Paul II (2022/2023), Rome-Warsaw 2025.

Thinking with St. John Paul II is an edition of lectures given by the lecturers of JPII Studies.
