= The Forgotten Holocaust =

1986 non-fiction book by Richard C. Lukas

The Forgotten Holocaust: The Poles Under German Occupation, 1939–1944
- Author: Richard C. Lukas
- Language: English / Polish
- Subject: Holocaust in Poland
- Publisher: University Press of Kentucky (1st English edition), Hippocrene Books (2nd and 3rd English editions); Wydawnictwo Jedność (1st Polish edition)/Dom Wydawniczy REBIS (2nd Polish edition)
- Publication date: 1986
- Publication place: United States / Poland
- Pages: 358
- ISBN: 0781813026

The Forgotten Holocaust: The Poles Under German Occupation, 1939–1944 is a 1986 book by Richard C. Lukas on the killing of, and other crimes against, Jewish and non-Jewish Poles by the Germans during the 1939–1945 occupation of Poland by Nazi Germany and the Soviet Union. It has been described as Lukas' most famous book.

The book's use of the term "Holocaust" in reference to non-Jewish victims of the Germans has been described as controversial, including by the author himself.

The book has been published in Polish translation (1995, 2012 editions) as Zapomniany holokaust: Polacy pod okupacją niemiecką 1939–1944. Subsequent editions include updates and new content. The 1997 and 2012 American editions feature a foreword by Norman Davies.

== Content ==
The book focuses on the "slaughter of Poles by German Nazis", including the systematic extermination of Polish Jews and crimes committed against the non-Jewish, ethnically-Polish population. The book also discusses Polish-Jewish relations during World War II, including Polish antisemitism as well as the rescue of Jews by ethnic Poles. Appendices include a bibliography, primary-source documents, and lists of Poles killed for helping Jews.

Norman Davies, in his foreword to the 1997 and 2012 American editions, observes that over the years Lukas' work has "rendered a valuable service by showing that no one can properly analyze the fate of one ethnic community in occupied Poland without referring to the fates of others." He writes that, "by expanding the grounds for discussion and by pointing to aspects of the period that were indeed in danger of being forgotten, [the book has] rendered a very real service."

The United States Holocaust Memorial Museum bibliography lists the book under "Poles", describing it as "[a]n account of the systematic persecution of the Polish nation and its residents by the German forces. Features endnotes, a bibliography, appendices including lists of Poles killed for assisting Jews, primary source documents, and an index.".

== Reviews ==
Gordon A. Craig, in The New York Review of Books (1986), called the book an "absorbing account of wartime Poland". Michael R. Marrus wrote in the Washington Post (1986) that "Lukas tells this story with an outrage properly contained within the framework of a scholarly narrative" but criticized what he felt was an unjustified "sustained polemic against Jewish historians". He added: "Lukas seriously underplays the importance of anti-Jewish ideology in the Polish consciousness. Few historians would accept his contentions that anti-Semitism was marginal".

George Sanford wrote in International Affairs (1986) that in tackling the subject of the suffering of ethnic Poles, Lukas' work is "strictly objective and academic in tone, presentation and content. But the underlying purpose is inevitably a polemical one, as he has to rake over the smouldering ashes of numerous sensitive controversies." Sanford observes that Lukas "corrects some prevalent misconceptions about alleged Polish anti-Semitism.... Interwar Poles may have had mixed views about their native Jews. But there was a total German failure to win over Polish collaborators. Even the odd individual cases of Poles who blackmailed or betrayed Jews were as rare as a few thousand out of 20 million ethnic Poles, as was conceded by a postwar Israeli war crimes commission. Chapter five demonstrates how unfounded, and even historically obscene, given the Poles' own suffering and wartime conditions, are any Jewish claims that Poles contributed in any substantive way to the Final Solution. Quite the contrary; individual Poles endangered their own lives to assist Jews to a far greater extent than might reasonably have been expected ..." He concludes: "There is little dramatically new for specialists in this sound study. But Lukas's argument that Jews and Poles were co-victims should be popularized amongst new generations, so that they can resist extremists, on both sides, who use this issue to drum up support for their respective national fanaticisms.

Donald E. Pienkos published a review in the Slavic Review (1986) that he later described as "generally praising the book". In 1987 David Engel wrote in the Slavic Review that, while the book purported to counter bias, it one-sidedly rebuked "Jewish historians". Engel listed alleged inaccuracies in the book and called it "not only unreliable but thoroughly tendentious". This started a protracted discussion in the Slavic Review that ran on until 1991, beginning with Lukas' 1987 reply to Engel. In 1988 Pienkos replied to Engel, defending his own original review and criticizing "Engel's attack upon Lukas's scholarship in his so-called ongoing discussion". Engel insisted that Lukas lacked familiarity "with the full range of Jewish historiography" and could not be regarded "as in any sense an expert on Polish-Jewish relations". Lukas and Engel, in an exchange of letters, continued to disagree about Engel's 1987 review. The Slavic Review published the final series of letters (including Pienkos' 1988 letter, as well as letters by Shimon Redlich and Jadwiga Maurer) in a 1991 Slavic Review issue. That exchange has been described as "particularly vicious" by Marci Shore.

Jadwiga Maurer criticized Lukas' focus on Jews' "linguistic deficiency", compared with other segments of Polish society, and their respective dialects and jargons; and his reliance on selected witness statements, rather than on a rich history of Polish literature featuring Jewish characters. Shimon Redlich accepted Engel's critique that Lukas would have benefited from a deeper familiarity with his source material and Lukas' critique that Jewish historians have been "influenced" by the Holocaust, but wrote that the ultimate truth lay with the likes of Jan Błoński and Jerzy Turowicz, whose "intellectual integrity and personal courage" allowed them to admit the role of anti-Semitism in Polish society, and its effects on the treatment of Jews during the Holocaust. The Slavic Review polemic series concluded with Lukas' reply criticizing Engels' book, In the Shadow of Auschwitz: The Polish Government-in-Exile and the Jews, 1939-1942, and suggesting that "Readers interested in the issues discussed in our exchange should read both of our books and draw their own conclusion."

Another Slavic Review reviewer, in 1986, Adam A. Hetnal, described the book as "the first attempt in the English language to provide a full and impartial evaluation of Poland under Nazi rule" and wrote that Lukas "convincingly argues that most ethnic Poles, though themselves living in a state of constant fear, and suffering from terrible malnutrition, not only showed compassion to the Jews, but attempted to, and did, help them. Poland was the only occupied country where one risked death even for giving a piece of bread to a Jew". Hetnal wrote that, "Although Lukas's study is praiseworthy and his assumptions are correct, it does not contain any new revelations for well-informed readers." He also criticized the 1986 edition for "sloppy, careless, and hasty editorial work and proofreading", but concluded that "These shortcomings notwithstanding, Lukas deserves praise for his pioneering attempt to examine a neglected and distorted topic with scholarly impartiality."

Edward D. Wynot, Jr., wrote in 1987 in The American Historical Review: "Although his observations and conclusions may not be welcome to some readers, they merit serious consideration by those seeking an objective and balanced treatment of this explosive subject. In sum, Lukas has produced a book destined to have a major impact on future studies of wartime Poland... Lukas has succeeded in fashioning a study that should stand the test of time and close scrutiny.

Also in 1987, Czesław Madajczyk wrote in Dzieje Najnowsze that the book has strengths and weaknesses, concluding that "[it] is a step forward in discussions about Nazi genocide and the fate of the Jews".

Keith Sword, in The Slavonic and East European Review (1988), called the book a "notable contribution" and wrote that "[Lukas] is to be congratulated... for his... attempt to achieve a fair and balanced view", and that "His book must surely become required reading for students of the holocaust and of contemporary Polish history for many years to come".

In 1998 Ewa Thompson, in the Sarmatian Review, praised the book for focusing on an under-researched area of history less generally known to the American public.

In 2012 Stanisław Salmonowicz called the book "valuable" and saw it as a balanced, middle-ground treatment of a difficult area of Polish-Jewish history.

The Polish edition was also well received in Poland, with positive reviews in the popular-history magazine Histmag and online history portal Historia.org.pl.

Writing in 2007, John T. Pawlikowski noted the comprehensive nature of the book, but regretted its reception within the Polish-American community as "a kind of Bible on the subject", arguing that Lukas' "basic error" is in treating ethnic Poles and Jews as "coequal victims of the Nazis".

== See also ==
- Poland’s Holocaust: Ethnic Strife, Collaboration with Occupying Forces and Genocide in the Second Republic, 1918–1947
