= Center for Political Thought =

Polish think tank

Educational and Scientific Society The Center for Political Thought (Towarzystwo Edukacyjno–Naukowe Ośrodek Myśli Politycznej; OMP) is a conservative think tank – an association with the status of a public benefit organisation, founded in Kraków in 1992.

OMP carries out educational and scientific activities in the field of philosophy and political thought, history, and international relations. It is also a place of public debate on Polish politics, contemporary ideological disputes, and international politics. It organizes scientific conferences, public debates, series of lectures and seminars for high school and graduate students, teachers and lecturers, and the wider public as well as conducts research and analytical work.

OMP publishes a series of books: “Library of Political Thought,” “Polish Intellectual Traditions,” “Library of the Classics of Polish Political Thought,” “From the archives of the security police. Unknown cards of the Polish People’s Republic,” “From the archives of World War II,” “Studies and Analyses,” “Classics of Philosophical Thought,” “Tradition and Culture,” and “Canon of Contemporary Philosophy.” In addition to the works of contemporary Polish and foreign authors, OMP publishes works of classics of political thought including Edmund Burke, Plato, Saint Thomas Aquinas, Lord Acton, Michał Bobrzyński, Paweł Popiel, Stanisław Tarnowski, Mirosław Dzielski, Julian Klaczko, Marian Zdziechowski, Jan Ludwik Popławski, Zygmunt Balicki, Adolf Bocheński, Władysław Konopczyński, Józef Szujski, Adam Heydl, Łukasz Górnicki, Henryk Rzewuski, Hieronim Kajsiewicz, Jan Koźmian, and Stanisław Koźmian. The series “Library of the Classics of Polish Political Thought” is the largest series of books offering the classics of Polish political thought to contemporary readers.

OMP also runs dedicated thematic websites where the results of its research are available. OMP cooperates with many Polish and foreign think tanks and universities.

The first president of OMP was Ryszard Legutko, in 2005–2018, this function was performed by Miłowit Kuniński, currently Jacek Kloczkowski holds this position.

Among the OMP members, authors and associates there are, among others: Monika Gabriela Bartoszewicz, Adam Burakowski, Marek A. Cichocki, Dariusz Gawin, Rafał Habielski, Dariusz Karłowicz, Krzysztof Kawalec, Jacek Kloczkowski, Marek Kornat, Paweł Kowal, Zdzisław Krasnodębski, Piotr Legutko, Marek Magierowski, Rafał Matyja, Filip Musiał, Zdzisław Najder, Andrzej Nowak, Dorota Pietrzyk–Reeves, Czesław Porębski, Arkady Rzegocki, Zbigniew Stawrowski, Aleksander Surdej, Krzysztof Szczerski, Kazimierz M. Ujazdowski, Łukasz Warzecha, Bronisław Wildstein, Henryk Woźniakowski, and Przemysław Żurawski vel Grajewski. They take part in conferences and public debates, write articles, and are also authors of monographs and edited collections published by OMP.

== The Managing Board members ==
- Dr Jacek Kloczkowski – president
- Dr Maciej Zakrzewski – vice president
- Zbigniew Zalewski – member of the board
- Dr hab. Filip Musiał – member of the board
- Prof. Czesław Porębski – member of the board
- Dr hab. Arkady Rzegocki – member of the board
