= Poland's Holocaust =

Book by Tadeusz Piotrowski

Poland’s Holocaust: Ethnic Strife, Collaboration with Occupying Forces and Genocide in the Second Republic, 1918–1947
- Author: Tadeusz Piotrowski
- Language: English
- Subject: history of Poland
- Publisher: McFarland & Company
- Publication date: 1998
- Publication place: United Kingdom
- Pages: xiv, 437
- ISBN: 9780786403714
- OCLC: 37195289

Poland’s Holocaust: Ethnic Strife, Collaboration with Occupying Forces and Genocide in the Second Republic, 1918–1947 is a 1998 book by sociologist Tadeusz Piotrowski about Poland's history in the interwar period and in World War II, with particular focus on the uneasy relations among various ethnic groups in the Second Polish Republic.

== Content ==
The book discusses the suffering of Polish citizens under Nazi and Soviet occupation and analyzes how Polish Jews, ethnic Poles, Belarusians, Lithuanians, and Ukrainians in the Polish lands resisted, or cooperated with, the occupying forces. The book includes tables, maps, primary-source documents, and a bibliography.

The United States Holocaust Memorial Museum, in its bibliography, lists the book under "Poles", describing it as follows: "Discusses the terror and oppression of Polish citizens by both the Nazi and Soviet militaries. Includes analysis of cooperation and resistance to the occupiers by Jews, Poles, Belorussians, Lithuanians, and Ukrainians in the Polish territories. Includes tables, maps, primary source documents, endnotes, a bibliography, and an index".

== Reception ==
Klaus-Peter Friedrich, then a doctoral student at the University of Cologne, writing in Zeitschrift für Ostmitteleuropa-Forschung (1999), considers the methodology in Poland's Holocaust to be questionable. Friedrich writes that the book is critical of Poland's ethnic minorities and apologetic toward ethnic Poles. In a 2005 Slavic Review article, Friedrich terms the book "unbalanced" as Piotrowski "considers collaboration exclusively under ethnic terms as if it was ethnically determined".

Judith Olsak-Glass, then a doctoral student in history at the University of Kansas, writing in Sarmatian Review (1999), views Piotrowski's book as a valuable contribution to the field, while seeing the chapter on Jewish collaboration as provocative. She appreciates Piotrowski's detailed examination of the massacres of Poles by Ukrainian nationalists.

Lisiunia A. Romanienko, then a doctoral student in sociology at Louisiana State University, writing in Humanity & Society (2000), praises Poland's Holocaust as "one of the most comprehensive and well documented, multi-methodological contributions to scholarly work in the area", highlighting its fresh approach to the roles of various ethnic groups in wartime collaboration.

Anna M. Cienciala in 2001 reviewed the book for Nationalities Papers, describing the book as "a solid study of the suffering, resistance, and collaboration."

In 2002 Gwido Zlatkes, a librarian at the University of California, reviewing the book in Polin: Studies in Polish Jewry, describes Poland's Holocaust as biased in favor of the Poles; Zlatkes finds that Piotrowski's "polemical passion" accords awkwardly with "scholarly discipline."

Jeremy Black, in The Holocaust: History & Memory (2016), writes that Poland's Holocaust is a "seriously unbalanced account" that "hijacked" the terminology of the Holocaust to include victims of the Soviet regime and portray the Jews as colloborators.

Adele Valeria Messina, an Italian historian at Calabria University, devotes a chapter to Poland's Holocaust in her 2017 book, American Sociology and Holocaust Studies: the Alleged Silence and the Creation of the Sociological Delay. She classes Piotrowski's book with works by Celia Stopnicka Heller and Jan T. Gross as an important voice for understanding what the Holocaust in Poland was. According to Messina, Piotrowski shows how the nationalist policies of the prewar Polish government and the national aspirations of minorities led to the outbreak of ethnic conflicts after the start of World War II. Ethnic minorities turned to collaboration with the occupying powers and against the interests of the Polish state. Piotrowski emphasizes collaboration by all the country's national groups as a factor contributing to the extent of the extermination of Jews in Poland. Messina highlights Piotrowski's effort to document, with the voices of witnesses, Polish collaboration as well as Polish assistance tendered to the Jews.

In 2023, in The Journal of Holocaust Research, Jan Grabowski mentioned Poland's Holocaust in passing, terming it a "collection of quotations taken out of context" with ahistorical claims.

== See also ==
- The Forgotten Holocaust
- The Rape of Nanking: The Forgotten Holocaust of World War II

== Sources ==
- Messina, Adele Valeria (2017-02-07). American Sociology and Holocaust Studies: The Alleged Silence and the Creation of the Sociological Delay. Academic Studies Press. pp. 169–182. doi:10.1515/9781618115485. ISBN 978-1-61811-548-5.
- Judith Olsak-Glass (January 1999). "Review of Piotrowski's Poland's Holocaust". Sarmatian Review. XIX (1).
- Romanienko, Lisiunia A. (2000). "Tadeusz Piotrowski. 1998. Poland's Holocaust (Book Review)". Humanity and Society. 24 (1). doi:10.1177/016059760002400110. ProQuest 1309377486.
