= Longchamps de Bérier =

Longchamps de Bérier is a French surname. Notable people with the surname include:

- Franciszek Longchamps de Bérier (born 1969), Polish legal scholar and Catholic priest
- Roman Longchamps de Bérier (1883-1941), Polish lawyer and university professor
