= Forgotten holocaust =

The Forgotten Holocaust is a 1986 book by Richard C. Lukas about the occupation of Poland during World War II.

Forgotten holocaust may also refer to:

- The Rape of Nanking: The Forgotten Holocaust of World War II, a 1997 book by Iris Chang about the 1937–1938 Nanking Massacre

== See also ==
- The Holocaust, World War II genocide of European Jews
- Armenian Holocaust, 1914–1923 murder and expulsion of Armenians by the Ottoman government in Turkey
- Romani Holocaust, World War II ethnic cleansing and genocide against Europe's Romani people
- Ukrainian Holocaust (Holodomor), 1932–33 famine in Soviet Ukraine
