= Longchamp =

Longchamp or Longchamps may refer to:

== Companies ==
- Longchamp (company), French luxury goods company founded in 1948 and named after Longchamp Racecourse
- Longchamps (restaurant chain), 20th-century restaurant chain in New York City

== Places ==
=== France ===
Most commonly:

- Longchamp Abbey, a former abbey in the Bois de Boulogne west of Paris
- Longchamp Racecourse, on the site of the former abbey, in the Bois de Boulogne west of Paris

Other places:

- Longchamp, Côte-d'Or, in the Côte-d'Or department
- Longchamp, Haute-Marne, in the Haute-Marne department
- Longchamp, Vosges, in the Vosges department
- Longchamp beach, a beach in the commune of Saint-Lunaire, Ille-et-Vilaine department
- Longchamp-sous-Châtenois, in the Vosges department
- Longchamp-sur-Aujon, in the Aube department
- Longchamps, Eure, in the Eure department
- Longchamps-sur-Aire, in the Meuse department
- Palais Longchamp, a palatial monument in Marseille

=== In other countries ===
- Longchamps, Buenos Aires, a city in Greater Buenos Aires, Argentina
- Longchamps, Éghezée, a village in Namur province, Belgium

== Surname ==
- William de Longchamp (fl. 1189–1197), Chancellor of England
- Edmond de Sélys Longchamps (1813–1900), Belgian politician and scientist
- Gaston Albert Gohierre de Longchamps (1842–1906), French mathematician
- Jean de Selys Longchamps (31 May 1912 – 16 August 1943), [Belgian aristocrat and RAF fighter pilot during World War II

== Other uses ==
- De Tomaso Longchamp, a two-door 2+2 coupe/cabriolet motor car

== See also ==
- Longchamps de Bérier, surname
