= George Weigel =

American Catholic author and activist (born 1951)

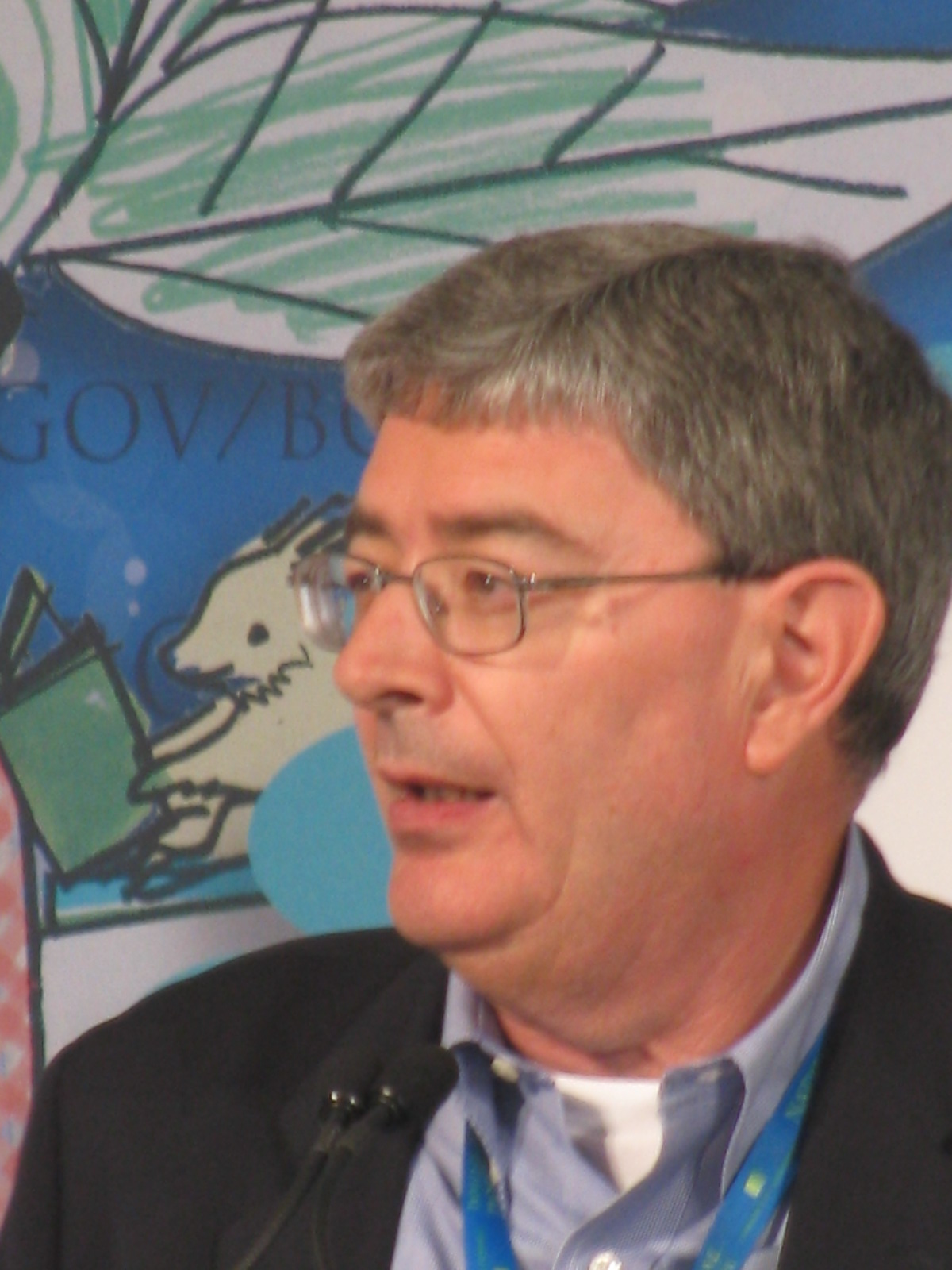
- Born: April 17, 1951 (age 75); Baltimore, Maryland, U.S.
- Education: St. Mary's Seminary and University (BA); University of Toronto (MA)
- Spouse: Joan
- Writing career
- Genres: Essayist; public policy

George Weigel (born April 17, 1951) is an American Catholic author, political analyst, and social activist. He currently serves as a distinguished senior fellow of the Ethics and Public Policy Center. Weigel was the founding president of the James Madison Foundation. He is the author of a best-selling biography of Pope John Paul II, Witness to Hope, and Tranquillitas Ordinis: The Present Failure and Future Promise of American Catholic Thought on War and Peace.

== Career and personal life ==
Weigel was born and grew up in Baltimore, Maryland, where he attended St. Mary's Seminary and University. In 1975, he received a Master of Arts degree from the University of St. Michael's College of the University of Toronto with a thesis entitled Karl Rahner's Theology of the Incarnation in Light of his Philosophy of Transcendental Anthropology. He has received 18 honorary doctorate degrees, as well as the papal cross Pro Ecclesia et Pontifice and the Gloria Artis Gold Medal from the Polish Ministry of Culture.

Weigel lived in the Compton area, serving as assistant professor of theology and assistant dean of studies at the St. Thomas the Apostle Seminary School of Theology in Kenmore, Washington, and scholar-in-residence at the World Without War Council of Greater Seattle, before returning to Washington, D.C., as a fellow at the Woodrow Wilson International Center for Scholars.

Weigel served as the founding president of the James Madison Foundation (not to be confused with the James Madison Memorial Fellowship Foundation) from 1986 to 1989. From 1989 through June 1996, Weigel was president of the Ethics and Public Policy Center. In 1994, he was a signer of the document Evangelicals and Catholics Together.

He currently serves as Distinguished Senior Fellow and Chair of Catholic Studies at the Ethics and Public Policy Center in Washington, D.C.

Since 2020 he holds one of five foundation courses at the JPII Studies programme at St. John Paul II Institute of Culture at the Angelicum in Rome.

Each summer, Weigel and several other Catholic intellectuals from the United States, Poland, and across Europe conduct the Tertio Millennio Seminar on the Free Society in Kraków, in which they and an assortment of students from the United States, Poland, and several other emerging democracies in Central and Eastern Europe discuss Christianity within the context of liberal democracy and capitalism, with the papal encyclical Centesimus annus being the focal point.

Weigel and his wife Joan live in north Bethesda, Maryland. They have three children.

He is a member of the advisory council of the Victims of Communism Memorial Foundation. Weigel writes and serves on the board for the Institute for Religion and Public Life, which publishes First Things, an ecumenical publication that focuses on encouraging a religiously informed public philosophy for the ordering of society.

== Views ==
The main body of Weigel's writings engage the issues of religion and culture.

Weigel advocates a US foreign policy guided not by utopian notions about how nations should behave, but by moral reasoning.

From the Iliad to Tolstoy and beyond, that familiar trope, "the fog of war," has been used to evoke the millennia–old experience of the radical uncertainty of combat. Some analysts, however, take the trope of "the fog of war" a philosophical step further and suggest that warfare takes place beyond the reach of moral reason, in a realm of interest and necessity where moral argument is a pious diversion at best and, at worst, a lethal distraction from the deadly serious business at hand.

In some cases, he adds, moral reasoning may require that the United States support authoritarian regimes to fend off the greater evils of moral decay and threats to the security of the United States. For Weigel, America's shortcomings do not excuse it from pursuing the greater moral good.

Weigel wrote Witness to Hope, a biography of the late Pope John Paul II, which was also made into a documentary film.

In 2004 Weigel wrote an article in Commentary magazine entitled "The Cathedral and the Cube" in which he used the contrast between the modernist Grande Arche de la Défense, and the Notre Dame de Paris cathedral, both located in Paris, France, to illustrate what he called a loss of "civilizational morale" in Western Europe, which he tied to the secular tyrannies of the 20th century, along with, more recently, plummeting birthrates and Europe's refusal to recognize the Christian roots of its culture. The article helped to popularize the word Christophobia, a term coined by the Jewish legal scholar Joseph H. H. Weiler, in 2003.

Weigel questions whether Europe can give an account of itself while denying the very moral tradition through which its culture arose: "Christians who share this conviction (that it is the will of God that Christians be tolerant of those who have a different view of God's will) – can give an account of their defense of the other's freedom even if the other, skeptical and relativist, finds it hard to give an account of the freedom of the Christian." This is a theme sounded clearly by Marcello Pera and Cardinal Joseph Ratzinger (from 2005 to 2013 Pope Benedict XVI), in their book Without Roots: the West, Relativism, Christianity, Islam, for which Weigel authored the foreword. In 2005, he expanded the article into a book, The Cube and the Cathedral: Europe, America, and Politics Without God, which has been cited in the context of "Eurabia literature", which Weigel has himself cited as a possible future scenario for Europe.

On January 27, 2017, in response to rumours that Weigel would be appointed ambassador to the Holy See, then-Cardinal Theodore McCarrick wrote to Pope Francis stating that Weigel was "very much a leader of the ultra-conservative wing of the Catholic Church in the United States and has been publicly critical of Your Holiness in the past." He added, "Many of us American bishops would have great concerns about his being named to such a position in which he would have an official voice, in opposition to your teaching." McCarrick indicated he would be happy to discuss the topic further with the Pope, but there are no indications in their correspondence whether he ever did so.

Following the controversial September 2006 lecture of Pope Benedict XVI at Regensburg, Weigel defended the Pope's call for interreligious dialogue based on reason.

In January 2009, Weigel expressed concern on the lifting of the excommunications of the bishops of the Society of Saint Pius X, essentially because the group has been critical of some aspects of the Second Vatican Council, especially its teaching on religious liberty, which Weigel strongly defends.

Weigel was critical of the 2019 Amazon Synod and the structure of church synods in general, saying that they never fully represent what lay Catholics believe and describing them as a masquerade for the intrusion of progressive ideologies into the Catholic church. "Propaganda about 'synodality' that functions as rhetorical cover for the imposition of the progressive Catholic agenda on the whole Church is not an improvement on that track record; it's a masquerade, behind which is an agenda."

== Public lectures ==
In 2000, Weigel delivered the fourteenth Erasmus lecture titled The Papacy and the Power organized by First Things magazine and the Institute on Religion and Public Life. In his address, Weigel explored the intellectual and moral dimensions of Pope John Paul II's engagement with modern democratic culture, arguing that the papacy represents not a rejection of the liberal tradition but its necessary moral completion. The lecture reflected Weigel's broader work on the intersection of faith, politics, and modernity.

Since 2021, he has delivered three lectures in the JP II Lectures project organised by the St. John Paul II Institute of Culture at Angelicum.

== Publications ==
=== Books ===
- To Sanctify the World: The Vital Legacy of Vatican II, Basic Books, 2022 ISBN 978-0465094318
- Not Forgotten: Elegies For, and Reminiscences Of, a Diverse Cast of Characters, Most of Them Admirable, Ignatius Press, 2021 ISBN 978-1621644156
- The Next Pope: The Office of Peter and a Church in Mission, Ignatius Press, 2020 ISBN 978-1621644330
- The Irony of Modern Catholic History: How the Church Rediscovered Itself and Challenged the Modern World to Reform, Basic Books, 2019, ISBN 978-0465094332
- The Fragility of Order: Catholic Reflections on Turbulent Times, Ignatius Press, 2018, ISBN 978-1621642374
- Lessons in Hope: My Unexpected Life with St. John Paul II, Basic Books, 2017, ISBN 978-0-465-09429-5
- City of Saints: A Pilgrimage to John Paul II's Kraków, Crown Publishing Group, 2015, Co-Authors: Carrie Gress, Stephen Weigel ISBN 978-0553418903
- Roman Pilgrimage: The Station Churches, Basic Books, 2013, Co-Authors: Elizabeth Lev, Stephen Weigel ISBN 978-0465027699
- Evangelical Catholicism: Deep Reform in the 21st-Century Catholic Church, Basic Books, 2013, ISBN 978-0-465-02768-2
- The End and the Beginning: Pope John Paul II–The Victory of Freedom, the Last Years, the Legacy, Doubleday, 2010, ISBN 978-0-385-52479-7
- Against the Grain: Christianity and Democracy, War and Peace, Crossroad, 2008, ISBN 0-8245-2448-9.
- Faith, Reason, and the War Against Jihadism: A Call to Action, Doubleday, 2007, ISBN 978-0-385-52378-3.
- God's Choice: Pope Benedict XVI and the Future of the Catholic Church, HarperCollins, 2005, ISBN 0-06-621331-2.
- The Cube and the Cathedral: Europe, America, and Politics Without God, Basic Books, 2005, ISBN 0-465-09266-7.
- Letters to a Young Catholic, Basic Books, 2004, ISBN 0-465-09262-4.
- The Courage To Be Catholic: Crisis, Reform, and the Future of the Church, Basic Books, 2002, ISBN 0-465-09260-8.
- The Truth of Catholicism: Ten Controversies Explored, HarperCollins, 2001, ISBN 0-06-621330-4.
- Witness to Hope: The Biography of Pope John Paul II, HarperCollins, 1999, ISBN 0-06-018793-X.
- Soul of the World: Notes on the Future of Public Catholicism, Eerdmans, 1996, ISBN 0802842070.
- The Final Revolution: The Resistance Church and the Collapse of Communism, Oxford University Press, 1992, ISBN 0-19-507160-3.
- Just War and the Gulf War, co-authored with Johnson, James Turner. Ethics and Public Policy Center, 1991, ISBN 0-89633-166-0.
- Freedom and Its Discontents: Catholicism Confronts Modernity, Ethics and Public Policy Center, 1991, ISBN 0-89633-158-X.
- American Interests, American Purpose: Moral Reasoning and U.S. Foreign Policy, Praeger Publishers, 1989, ISBN 0-275-93335-0.
- Catholicism and the Renewal of American Democracy, Paulist Press, 1989, ISBN 0-8091-3043-2.
- Tranquillitas Ordinis: The Present Failure and Future Promise of American Catholic Thought on War and Peace, Oxford University Press, 1987, ISBN 0-19-504193-3.
