= Helen Alford =

English Dean Pontifical University of Saint Thomas Aquinas (born 1964)

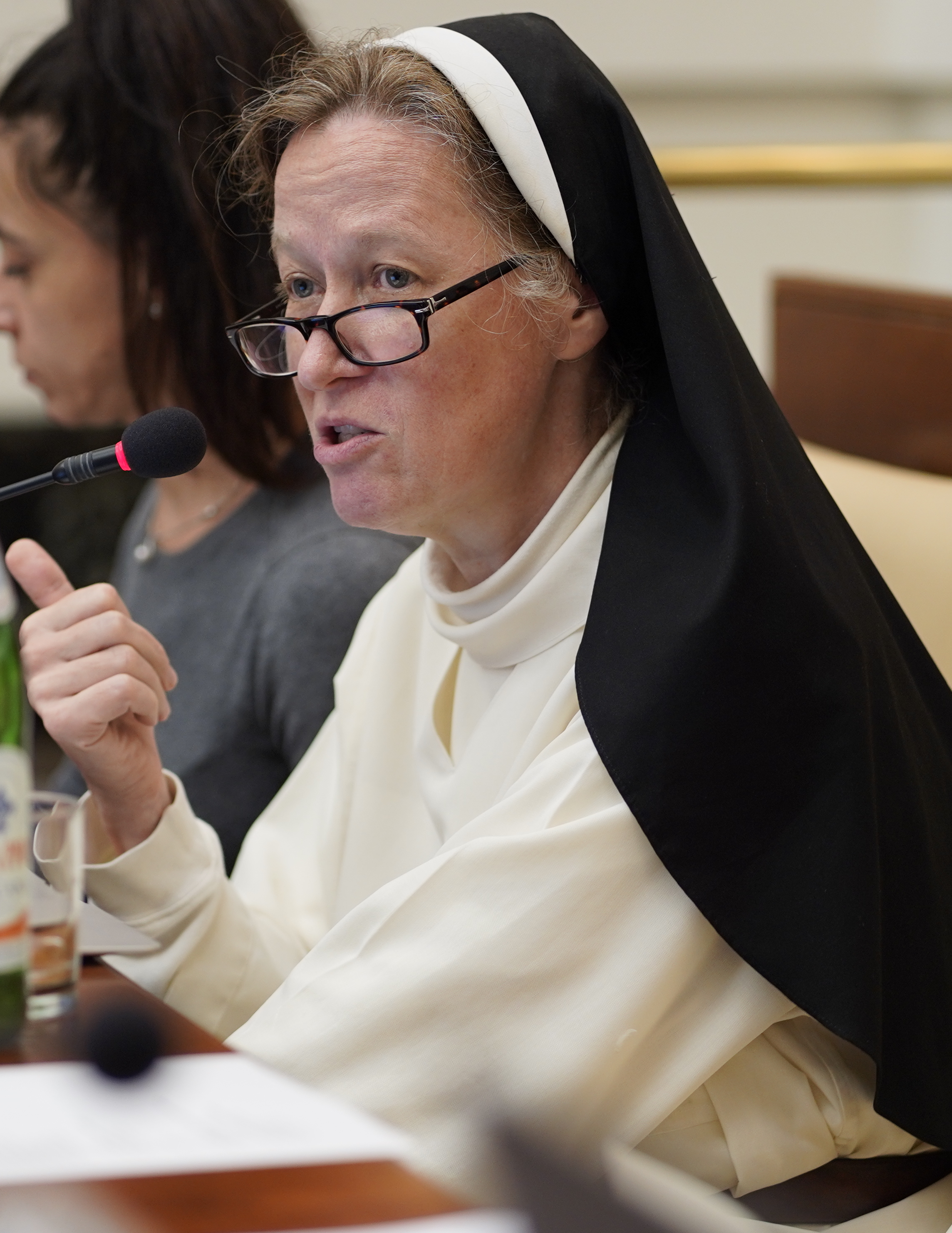
Sr. Helen Alford

Helen Mary Josephine Alford, OP (born 1 May 1964) is an English Catholic economist and dean of social sciences at the Pontifical University of Saint Thomas Aquinas in Rome. April 1, 2023, was appointed president of the Pontifical Academy of Social Sciences. She is a member of the Dominican Sisters of Saint Catherine of Siena of Newcastle, Natal.

== Education and appointments ==
Helen Mary Josephine Alford was born in London.

She holde a BA in engineering (later promoted to a Masters by seniority), a MEng, and a doctorate in Engineering Management all from the University of Cambridge.

Alford taught at Cambridge after receiving her doctorate. She entered the order of Dominican Sisters of Saint Catherine of Siena of Newcastle, Natal in 1994. She took two years of theology courses at Blackfriars, Oxford, 1994-1996. Beginning in October 1996, she studied for a Licence in Sacred Liturgy at Sant'Anselmo, Rome, and in January 1999 transferred to the Licence programme to Morals at the Angelicum.

Alford teaches courses on economic ethics, the history of technology, labor politics, and Catholic social thought; most of her teaching since becoming a Dominican has been at the Angelicum, a university founded and administered by members of that order. Her first assignment there was in 1996; in 2009, she was named full professor. She was elected dean of the social sciences faculty in May 2001 and re-elected for three further terms. She later became vice-rector and then, once again, dean of social sciences in 2021.

Since 2020 she holds one of five foundation courses at the JPII Studies programme at St. John Paul II Institute of Culture at the Angelicum in Rome.

== Research and publishing ==
Her numerous publications address questions of social ethics, health equity, and the responsible distribution of wealth.

She is member of Editorial Boards of various academic journals, including Journal of Catholic Social Thought, Finance and Common Good, Transforming Business, OIKONOMIA: Journal of Ethics and Social Sciences, and the Dizionario della Dottrina Sociale della Chiesa: Le cose nuove del XXI secolo.

A selection of her publications follows:

- Il carcere degli esclusi: le condizioni civili degli stranieri nelle carceri italiane (with Alberto Lo Presti). Cinisello Balsamo: Edizioni Paoline, 2005.
- Helen Alford and Francesco Compagnoni (eds.), Preaching Justice: Dominican Contributions to Social Ethics in the Twentieth Century, Dublin: Dominican Publications, 2007.
- Helen Alford and Francesco Compagnoni (eds.), Fondare la responsabilità sociale d'impresa: contributi dalle scienze umane e dal pensiero sociale cristiano. Rome: Città Nuova, 2008.
- Rediscovering abundance: interdisciplinary essays on wealth, income, and their distribution in the catholic social tradition. Notre Dame, Indiana: University of Notre Dame Press, 2006.
- Managing as if faith mattered: Christian social principles in the modern organization (with Michael Naughton). Notre Dame, Indiana: University of Notre Dame Press, 2001, 2008.
- Preaching justice II. Contributions of Dominican Sisters to Social Ethics in the Twentieth Century (with Francesco Compagnoni ). Dublin: Dominican Publications, 2016.
- Helen Alford and Marina Russo (eds.),In a Different Voice: Reflections on Catholic Social Thought from and for East Europe, Angelicum University Press, 2020.
- Helen Alford (ed.), Preaching and the Arts / Predicazione e arte: Communitas 2021, Angelicum University Press, 2022.
- Helen Alford and Marina Russo (eds.), Catholic Universities of Central, Eastern and Western Europe in a Secularizing World: Experiences and Challenges, Rome, Angelicum University Press, 2023.
