= Pacem in terris =

1963 encyclical of Pope John XXIII

Pacem in terris Latin for 'Peace on Earth' Encyclical of Pope John XXIII
- Signature date: 11 April 1963
- Subject: That peace between all peoples must be based on truth, justice, love and freedom
- Number: 8 of 8 of the pontificate
- Text: In Latin; In English

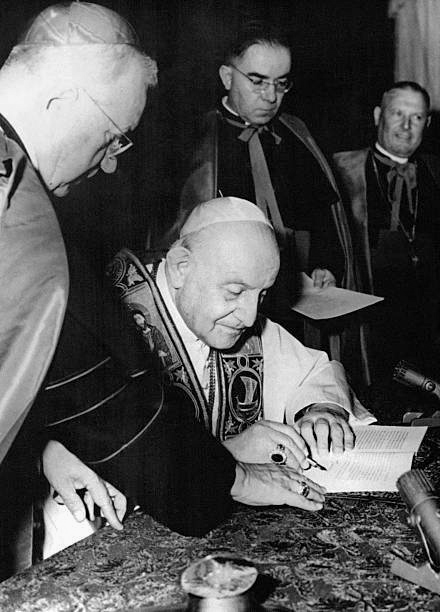
Pope John XXIII signing Pacem in terris, April 1963

Pacem in terris (lit. 'Peace on Earth') is a papal encyclical issued by Pope John XXIII on 11 April 1963, on the rights and obligations of people and their states, as well as proper interstate relations. It emphasizes human dignity and human equality in endorsing women's rights, nuclear nonproliferation and the United Nations.

It was the last encyclical drafted by Pope John XXIII, who was diagnosed with cancer in September 1962 and died two months after its completion. Biographer Peter Hebblethwaite called it his "last will and testament". Published on Holy Thursday, John called it his Easter gift.

Due to its importance and popularity, Pacem in terris is held in the UN archives.

== Title ==
The full title of the encyclical is On Establishing Universal Peace in Truth, Justice, Charity and Liberty. The short title Pacem in terris is derived from the opening words of the encyclical, as is customary with papal documents:

Pacem in terris, quam homines universi cupidissime quovis tempore appetiverunt, condi confirmarique non posse constat, nisi ordine, quem Deus constituit, sancte servato.
("Peace on earth, for which all men of every era have most eagerly yearned, cannot be firmly established unless the order which God laid down is dutifully observed.")

== History ==
Pacem in terris was the first encyclical that a pope addressed to "all men of good will", rather than only to Catholics, quoting the phrase to God as said by the heavenly army above the manger of Bethlehem (Latin Vulgate: in terra pax in hominibus bonae voluntatis, Luke 2:14; English translation: 2:13–14). Learned Hand Professor of Law at Harvard Law School, Mary Ann Glendon, interprets this to mean, "He was insisting that the responsibility for setting conditions for peace does not just belong to the great and powerful of the world—it belongs to each and every one of us." In theological terms, it marked a major shift in papal teaching from reliance on classical scholastic categories of natural law to a more inductive approach based on the signs of the times.

In this work, John XXIII reacted to the political situation in the middle of the Cold War. Coming just months after the 1962 Cuban Missile Crisis, during which the Vatican served as an intermediary between the White House and the Kremlin, the document also reflected the Pope's experience of 1960 in trying to resolve difficulties arising out of the four-power occupation of Berlin. The "peace encyclical" was issued only two years after the erection of the Berlin Wall. It also draws on Pope John's reading of Saint Augustine's The City of God and Thomas Aquinas' view of Eternal Law. In this it echoes the Gospel's core values and principles of patristic and medieval thought, while reflecting the historical period in which it was written.

Sociologist Monsignor Pietro Pavan and a small group of theologians helped draft it. In Pavan's view Pacem in terris would present the teachings of Leo XIII on the eternal law, "in light of the changing tides of history, and allow them to resonate with a much wider audience".

The Pope explains in this encyclical that conflicts "should not be resolved by recourse to arms, but rather by negotiation". He further emphasizes the importance of respect of human rights as an essential consequence of the Christian understanding of men. He clearly establishes "that every man has the right to life, to bodily integrity, and to the means which are suitable for the proper development of life."

Pacem in terris is an extended reflection on the moral order. The document is divided into four sections.

- The first section of the encyclical establishes the relationship between individuals and humankind, encompassing the issues of human rights and moral duties.
- The second section addresses the relationship between man and state, dwelling on the collective authority of the latter.
- The third section establishes the need for equality amongst nations and the need for the state to be subject to rights and duties that the individual must abide by.
- The final section presents the need for greater relations between nations, thus resulting in collective states assisting other states. The encyclical ends with the urging of Catholics to assist non-Christians and non-Catholics in political and social aspects.

== Reception ==
“Pacem in Terris was more than an encyclical—it was an event," recalls Glendon. Pacem in Terris was the first papal encyclical published in its entirety in The New York Times. The Washington Post said, "Pacem in terris is not just the voice of an old priest, nor just that of an ancient Church; it is the voice of the conscience of the world." According to the periodical The Catholic World Report, "Two years later, it was the subject of a conference at the United Nations attended by over 2,000 statespersons and scholars."

== Legacy ==
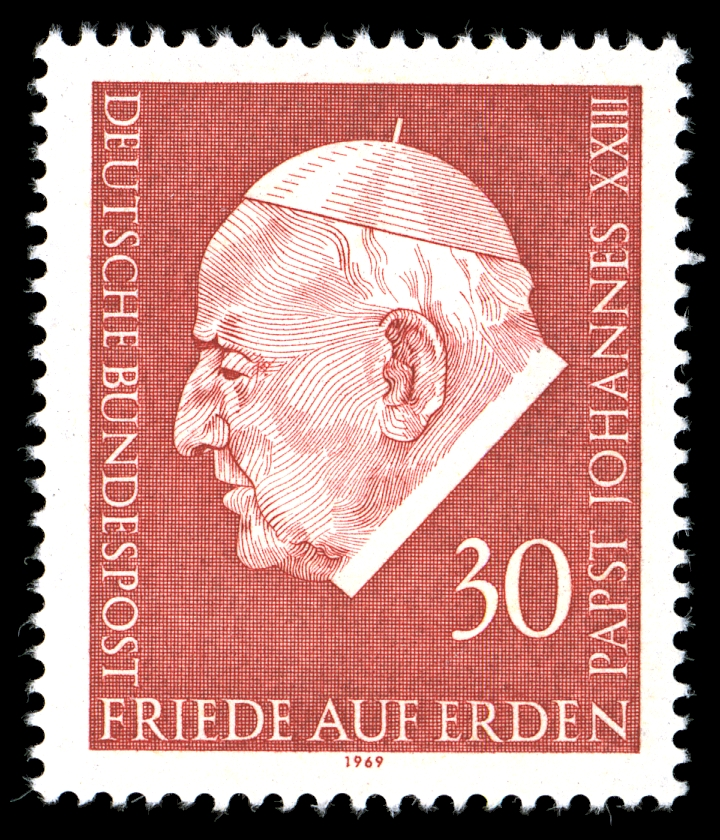
1969 West German stamp of John XXIII

Academic Russell Hittinger describes the encyclical "as a kind of magna carta of the Catholic Church's position on human rights and natural law". Pope John XXIII's 1963 encyclical Pacem in terris ("Peace on Earth") radically affected Catholic social teaching not only on war and peace, but on church-state relations, women's rights, religious freedom, international relations and other major issues. Fr. J. Bryan Hehir called Pacem in terris "a pivotal text in [papal] encyclical history" that played a major role in the development of the Second Vatican Council's Declaration on Religious Freedom and its Pastoral Constitution on the Church in the Modern World, and on Pope John Paul II's encyclical Centesimus annus ("The Hundredth Year"), which marked the centennial of Pope Leo XIII's 1891 encyclical on labor, Rerum novarum. It also influenced the 1965 Declaration on Religious Freedom (Dignitatis humanae).

In commemoration of the encyclical, the annual Pacem in Terris Peace and Freedom award was instituted in 1964, first by the Diocese of Davenport and later by the Quad Cities Pacem in Terris Coalition.

During an event held on 6 May 2019, in Bulgaria, where John XXIII had gained a reputation for protecting Jews when serving as the country's Vatican representative, Pope Francis invoked the encyclical as a "code of conduct" for peace between Catholics and other religions.

== See also ==
- List of encyclicals of Pope John XXIII
- Pacem in Terris Award
- Tranquillitas ordinis
- Universal Declaration of Human Rights
