= Tranquillitas ordinis =

Latin phrase associated with just war theory

Tranquillitas ordinis is a Latin phrase meaning the 'tranquility of order' or 'well-ordered concord'. The term is associated with the Roman Catholic tradition of just war theory, and is found in the writings of Augustine of Hippo and Thomas Aquinas. Depending on the author and the context, the term is used to convey various meanings in theology and politics. These meanings include the divine order imposed on the universe and a theoretical framework for peace. Tranquillitas ordinis remains a cornerstone of Catholic teaching on peace. It is included in the framework laid out by Pope John XXIII in his 1963 encyclical, Pacem in terris, and is a featured topic at The Global Quest for Tranquillitas Ordinis, a conference organized by the Pontifical Academy of Social Sciences.

== The Augustinian tradition ==
Augustine of Hippo defines the term "Tranquillitas Ordinis" in Book 19 of the City of God as "the peace of all things" or "well-ordered concord". Augustine links peace with his meaning of order, in which all things in the universe have their proper place established by God, their creator. Peace is therefore the state a person or thing achieves when it is in accordance with the larger created order. In Book 19, Augustine describes the supreme good and discusses efforts people take in order to reach happiness on earth. While Augustine denies the possibility of achieving tranquillitas ordinis on earth, he notes that aspects of the peace and happiness of heaven may still be found. Centuries later, Thomas Aquinas continued the tradition of true peace as tranquillitas ordinis in his Summa Theologica. Aquinas built upon the work of Augustine and formalized a theory of just war in which the Augustinian root idea of peace as tranquillitas ordinis is linked to the just war tradition. In the Summa Theologica, Aquinas describes the theory of just war as comprising a jus ad bellum and jus in bello. Jus ad bellum articulates the circumstances under which war may be pursued, while jus in bello describes correct conduct in war.

== George Weigel ==
George Weigel is a prominent Catholic political and social author who serves as a Distinguished Senior Fellow of the Ethics and Public Policy Center. In his book Tranquillitas Ordinis: The Present Failure and Future Promise of American Catholic Thought on War and Peace, published in 1987, Weigel defines tranquillitas ordinis as the peace of "dynamic and rightly ordered political community" and "the order created by just political community and mediated through law". Weigel also argued that tranquillitas ordinis provided a basis for the establishment of peace as a "jus ad pacem" to accompany the just war theory terms jus ad bellum and jus in bello, that is, a guide to achieving peace through political means, including war. Weigel expands on this concept to insist that the U.S. has a moral obligation under the criteria of tranquilitas ordinis to rid the world of terrorist organizations and prevent rogue regimes from obtaining weapons of mass destruction. Weigel states in clear terms that tranquillitas ordinis is a concept of peace that the U.S. must spread internationally in a "quest for ordered liberty in an evolving structure of international public life capable of advancing the classic goals of politics—justice, freedom, order, the general welfare, and peace." Weigel establishes this view of tranquillitas ordinis as a practical concept for attempting to achieve peace on earth in combination with other like-minded nations. As such, tranquillitas ordinis exists as a framework for the public diplomacy of the United States.

== See also ==
- Cultural diplomacy
- Foreign policy
- Public diplomacy
