= Jarosław Kilian =

Polish director, art historian and pedagogue

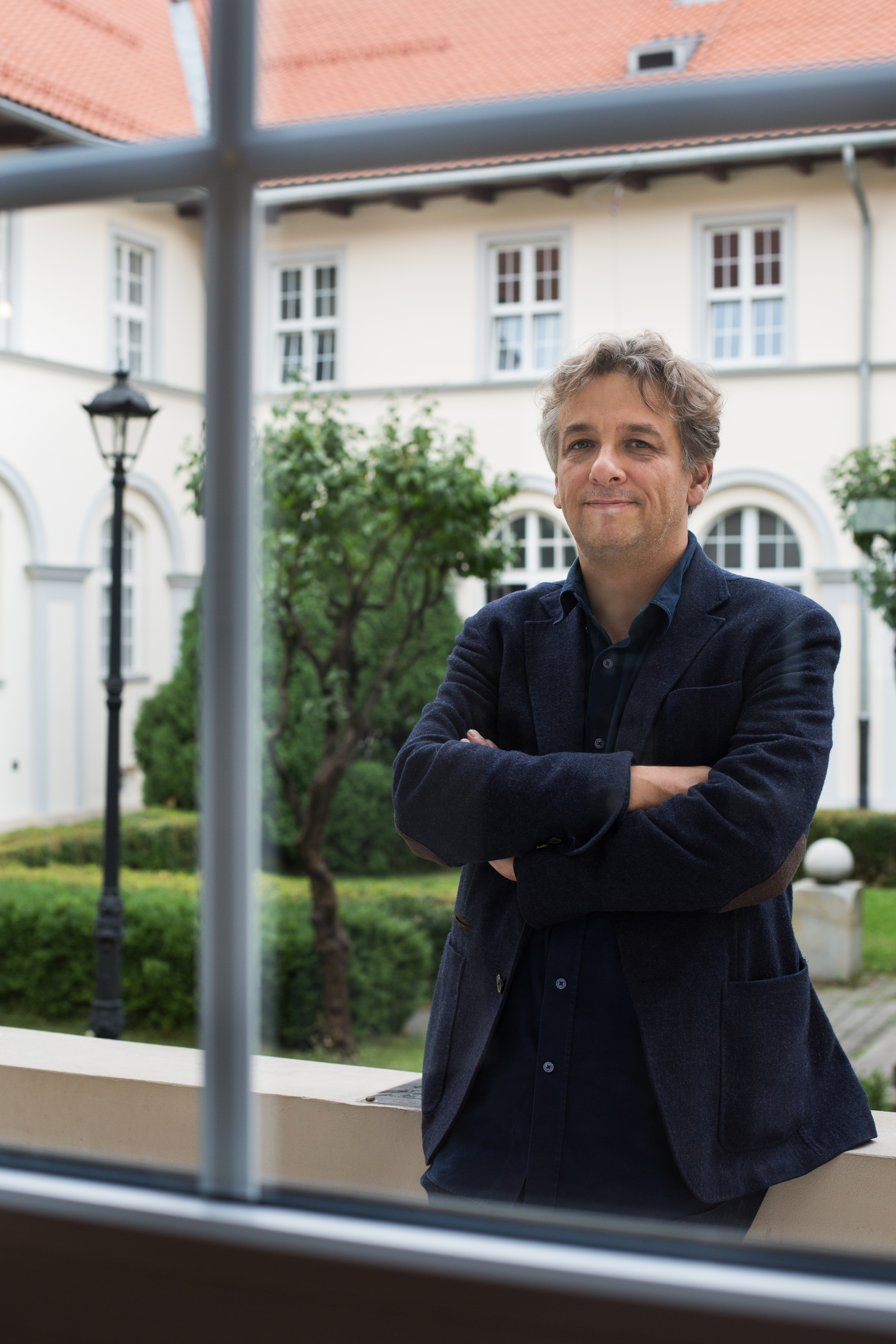
Image of Jaroslaw Kilian

Jarosław Adam Kilian, born in Poland in 1962, is a Polish director for theatres, operas and TV, an art historian, and a pedagogue. He is the son of Polish designer Adam Kilian.

He is an art history graduate of the University of Warsaw (1986) and also graduated in directing from Warsaw’s drama school (1990). He trained with Peter Brook in Vienna (1992). He has been working at drama theatres and opera houses all over Poland since 1990. From 1999 to 2010 Artistic Director of Theatre Polski in Warsaw in charge of creating the artistic policy, repertoire, cast and image of Theatre Polski, which from 1913 has been a well-known Polish theatre. There are two stages (main house for 800 spectators). Theatre Polski employs about 40 actors, many of them are the most famous Polish stars.

From 2010 Director of Collegium Nobilium Theatre –of State Theatre Academy From 2006 Dean of the Directing Faculty at Theatre Academy in Warsaw

== Directed theatre productions (selected) ==
2011 "The Wizard of Oz" in Słowacki`s Theatre in Cracow 2011 "The Adventures of Sindbad" by B.Leśmian, based upon The 1001 Nights` Tales, Theatre Slaski, Katowice

2010 scenario of documentary film on Chopin with Ian Gillan "Chopin`s story by Ian Gillan from Deep Purple" 2008, 2009, 2010 Gala performances for National Opera in Warsaw 1997 "The Day of the Eagles" - US President Clinton visit to Warsaw, Royal Castle Square, Warsaw 1997 "Music and Sacrum" - program for Polish TV 1997 "London in Cracow" - gala show for British Airways, Theatre, Słowackiego, Cracow 1996 "Pastorałka" (The Christmas Play) by L. Schiller, Theatre Polski, Warsaw 1996 "Uncle Vanya" by M.Chekhov, workshop at West Yorkshire, Play House, Leeds, Great Britain 1994 "The Card Index" by T.Różewicz, Theatre Miejski, Gdynia 1994 "Balladyna" by J.Słowacki, Theatre Powszechny, Warszawa 1994 Rotary Gala - opera concert in The National Opera, Warszawa 1993 "Cynologist Irresolute" Opera by H.Czyż and S.Mrożek, National Opera, Warszawa 1992 "The Adventures of Sindbad" by B.Leśmian, based upon The 1001 Nights` Tales, Theatre Miejski, Gdynia 1991 "The Comedy of Errors" by Shakespeare, Theatre Kochanowskiego, Opole 1991 "Hansel und Gretel" the Opera by E.Humperdinck, Great Theatre, Łódź 1990 "Stars in the Morning Sky" by A.Galin, Theatre Studio, Warsaw

Productions for Theatre Polski in Warsaw include:

2010 "Pinocchio" by Collodi 2009 "The Winter`s Tale" by Shakespeare, 2007 "As You Like it" by Shakespeare, 2005 "The Odyssey" by Homer 2003 "The Tempest" by Shakespeare, 2001 "Don Juan" by Molière, 1999 "Trifling with Devils" by J. Drda, 1998 "A Midsummer Night`s Dream" by W. Shakespeare,

== Published books translated to Polish ==
From French: Tintin series, Asterix series

From English: Terry Deary Horrible Histories (5 books: The Awesome Egyptians, The Groovy Greeks, Greek Legends, The Rotten Romans) Osprey`s Men-at Arms Series (3 books)
