= Edward D. Wynot Jr. =

American historian (1943–2020)

Edward Davis Wynot Jr. (1943–2020) was an American professor of Russian and East European history at Florida State University. He authored several books and dozens of academic articles, primarily concerned with the topic of the history of Poland.

Reviewing his Caldron of Conflict: Eastern Europe, 1918–1945, Sabrina P. Ramet noted that "Wynot made his reputation as a specialist in Polish affairs".

== Works ==
- The Ukrainians and the Polish regime 1937-1939 (1970)
- Polish Politics in Transition: The Camp of National Unity and the Struggle for Power, 1935-1939 (1974)
- Warsaw Between the World Wars: Profile of the Capital City in a Developing Land, 1918-1939 (1983)
- Caldron of Conflict: Eastern Europe, 1918–1945 (1999)
- The Polish Orthodox Church in the twentieth century and beyond: prisoner of history (2015)
