= Marek Cichocki =

Polish philosopher

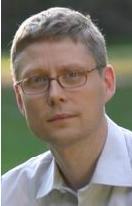
- Born: 9 May 1966 (age 59); Warsaw, Poland
- Occupations: journalist, columnist, historian of political thought
- Spouse: Lena Dąbkowska-Cichocka

Marek Aleksander Cichocki (born 1966 in Warsaw) is a Polish philosopher, historian of political thought, journalist, conservative columnist and former advisor to Lech Kaczyński, the late president of Poland.

== Biography ==
Cichocki graduated in German Studies, and in 1998 he received his PhD degree in philosophy at the Institute of Philosophy and Sociology of the Polish Academy of Sciences.

Between 1996 and 2000 he was an assistant professor in the Institute of Applied Social Sciences at the University of Warsaw, where he has worked since 2001 as adjunct professor. Between 2000 and 2002 he lectured in political science at the Melchior Wankowicz Warsaw College of Journalism. He is also a Fellow of the Collegium Invisible.

Cichocki's scholarly interests include history of political thought (particularly conservative thought and its contemporary perceptions) and current social and political issues including international relations, especially Polish-German relations.

He was program director of the Center for International Relations in Warsaw. Since 2004 he has been program director at the Natolin European Center and editor-in-chief of its periodical. Since 2003 he has been publisher and editor-in-chief of the yearbook Political Theology. He collaborates with the Center for Political Thought in Krakow. He has published a number of books, essays and articles on philosophy, political science, and international relations, including Polska-Unia Europejska, W pół drogi (2002), Porwanie Europy (2004), or Władza i pamięć (2006).

Between 2007 and 2010 he co-hosted with Dariusz Gawin and Dariusz Karlowicz Trzeci Punkt Widzenia (A Third Point of View), a TV programme broadcast by the public Polish Television (TVP).

From 11 January 2007 Cichocki served as a citizen advisor to President Lech Kaczyński. He was a major Polish negotiator during the European Union summit in Brussels in June 2007.

Married to Lena Dabkowska-Cichocka.
