= Franciszek Longchamps de Bérier =

Polish jurist (born 1969)

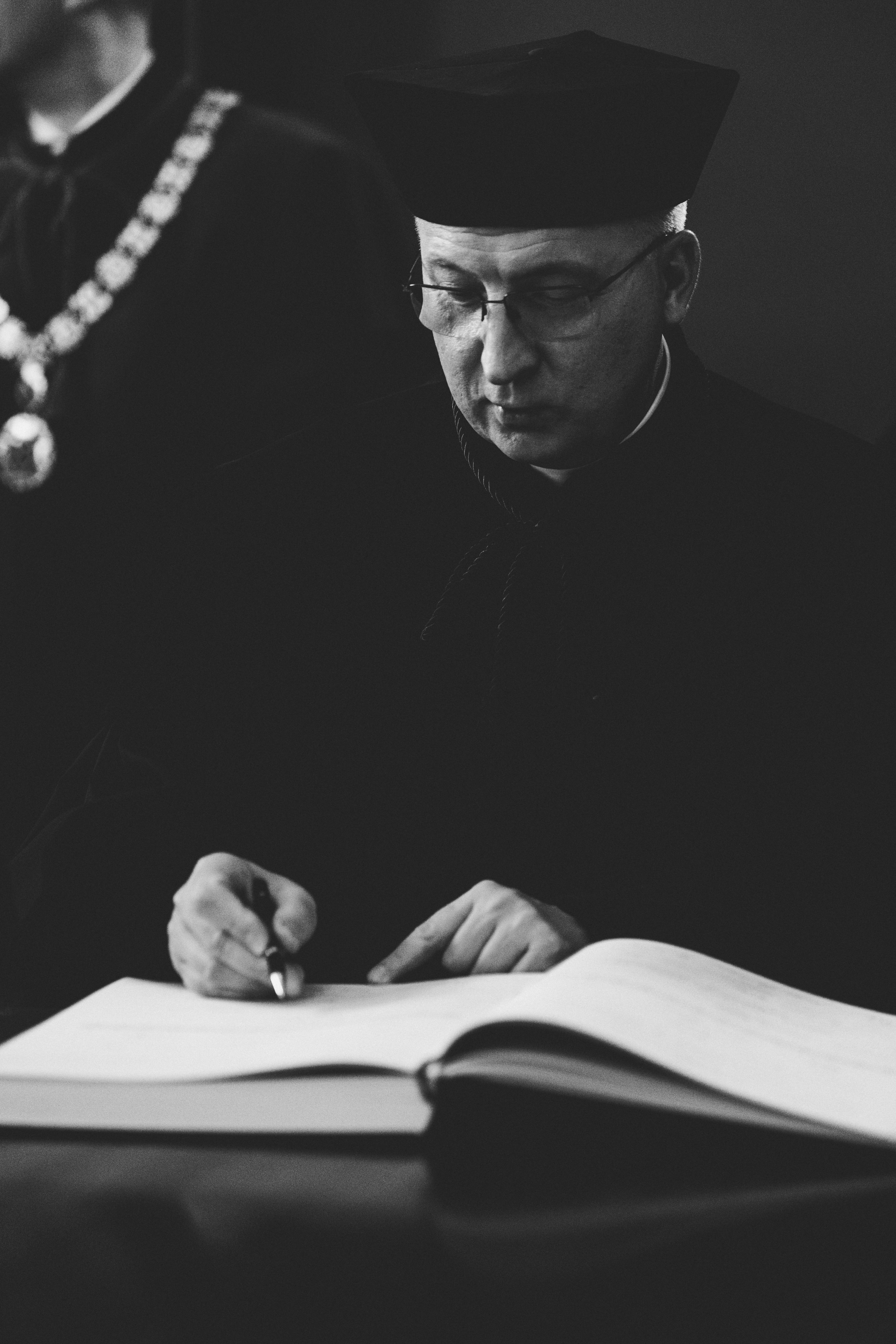
- Franciszek Longchamps de Bérier (2026)
- Born: October 23, 1969 (age 57); Wrocław
- Education: University of Warsaw; Georgetown University; Pontifical Faculty of Theology in Warsaw
- Occupations: lawyer, law professor
- Scientific career
- Fields: Roman law and civil law, legal history, European legal tradition, law of succession/inheritance law, methodology of private law, freedom of speech, and freedom of religion
- Workplaces: Jagiellonian University; University of Warsaw
- Website: https://longchamps.pl/

Franciszek Jakub Longchamps de Bérier (born October 23, 1969) is a Polish Catholic priest, legal scholar, Professor of Law and the Head of the Department of Roman Law at the Faculty of Law and Administration of the Jagiellonian University in Kraków. He also teaches at the Faculty of Law and Administration of the University of Warsaw.

== Education ==
Longchamps studied law from 1988 to 1993 at the University of Warsaw, where he has degrees of a Doctor of Law (1997) and a Doctor Habilitated of Law (2004). In 1992 he earned an LL.M. from Georgetown University. He earned a master's degree in Theology (1996) and a licentiate in Theology (2001) at the Pontifical Faculty of Theology in Warsaw. Nominated as a Full Professor of Law by the President of the Republic of Poland (2012).

== Research interests ==
Longchamps's research extends over several areas, covering Roman law and civil law, legal history, European legal tradition, law of succession/inheritance law, methodology of private law, freedom of speech, and freedom of religion in US law.

== Academic career ==
Longchamps joined the Faculty Law and Administration of the University of Warsaw in 1993. In 2005–2008, he was an associate professor at the University of Warsaw. In 2007, he became an associate Professor of Law at the Jagiellonian University and the Head of the Department of Roman Law at the Faculty of Law and Administration; since 2018, Full Professor at the Jagiellonian University. He was elected to the Committee of Legal Sciences of the Polish Academy of Sciences for three consecutive terms in the years 2011–2023. Since 2020, he is the director of the postgraduate course in contract law at the Faculty of Law and Administration of the Jagiellonian University. He joined the Centre for Law and Religious Freedom at the Jagiellonian University. Since 2023 editor-in-chief of the law journal “Forum Prawnicze” (“Legal Forum”). Since 2025, he has been teaching at the Graduate School of Law at San Beda University in Manila, Philippines.

== Honors ==
In 2023, Longchamps was awarded the Officer's Cross of the Order of Polonia Restituta.

== Priestly activity ==
Longchamps was ordained a priest in 2001 in Warsaw. In 2003–2005, he was an academic chaplain at St. Anne's Academic Church in Warsaw. Since 2007, a resident at the Parish of St. James, Warsaw in Ochota, Warsaw, and since 2022, the spiritual father of the Ochota Deanery. Since 2008, he is an expert on bioethics for the Polish Bishops' Conference. Since 2017, has represented the Polish Episcopal Conference in the Legal Affairs Commission of the Bishops’ Conference of the European Community (COMECE).

In 2022, he was appointed an honorary canon of the Warsaw Cathedral Chapter.

== Personal life ==
Longchamps de Bérier is the great-grandson of the Polish lawyer Roman Longchamps de Bérier, and is of distant French descent.

== Selected publications ==
- Five centuries of civil procedure: the Polish experience in a European context (16th to 21st centuries), A. Dziadzio, F. Longchamps de Bérier (Eds.), Brill Nijhoff (Leiden-Boston 2025).
- Freedom of Speech and Religion in the United States Constitution, C.H. BECK (Warszawa 2024)
- Law and Christianity in Poland. The Legacy of the Great Jurists, eds. F. Longchamps de Bérier, R. Domingo, Routledge (London-New York 2023)
- [with W. Dajczak and T. Giaro] Prawo rzymskie. U podstaw prawa prywatnego, Wydawnictwo PWN, 3rd edn. (Warszawa 2018)
- Theory and practice of codification: the Chinese and Polish perspective – 法典化的理论与实践 : 中国与波兰的比较, eds. Ch. Su, P. Grzebyk, F. Longchamps de Bérier, Chinese Academy of Social Sciences (Beijing 2018)
- L’abuso del diritto nell’esperienza del diritto privato romano, G. Giappichelli Editore (Torino 2013)
- Textbook on the First Amendment: Freedom of Speech and Freedom of Religion, Wydawnictwo Od.Nowa (Kraków 2012)
- Law of Succession. Roman Legal Framework and Comparative Law Perspective, Wolters Kluwer Polska (Warszawa 2011)
- Fedecomesso universale nel diritto romano classico, Wydawnictwo LIBER (Warszawa 1997)
- The Use of Law and Legal Studies for the Methodological Renewal of Dogmatic Theology, in Law and Interdisciplinarity, eds. P. Hellwege, M. Soniewicka, Mohr Siebeck (Tübingen 2024) 75–93 [with P. Tereszkiewicz]
- Länderbericht Polen, in Internationales Erbrecht: EuErbVO, IntErbRVG, DurchfVO. Länderberichte, eds. W. Gierl et al., 4rd edn., Nomos Verlagsgesellschaft (Baden-Baden 2024) 814–830
- Laziness as an Anthropological Challenge for Law in the Time of the Pandemic, in Human Dignity, Vulnerability and Law. Studies on the Dignity of Human Life, ed. J.M. Puyol Montero, Real Collegio Complutense at Harvard Law School, Editorial Tirant Lo Blanch (Valencia 2023) 79–102
- El sujeto jurídico en el Derecho romano de la era cristiana, in El sujeto de derecho. Experiencia jurídica romana y actualidad, eds. B. Periñán Gómez et al., Editorial Gomares (Granada 2023) 25–33
- Donatio mortis causa and legatum per vindicationem. New Remarks on the Methodology of Private Law Studies, “Studia et Documenta Historia et Iuris” 88 (2022) 41–101
- The Historical Lawyer and the Goals of Legal Education, “Zbornik Pravnog fakulteta u Zagrebu” 72 (2022) No. 3, 777–797
- Religious freedom and legal education, “Forum Prawnicze” 6 (2021) 22–33
- Hermogenianus and the Fundaments of Legal Anthropology, “Studia et Documenta Historiae et Iuris” 87 (2021) 49–90
- Persona: bearer of rights and anthropology for law, in Human dignity and law: studies on the dignity of human life, ed. J.M. Puyol Montero, Real Collegio Complutense at Harvard Law School, Editorial Tirant Lo Blanch (Valencia 2021) 23-54 波兰继承法的百年变迁 (Private Law in Transition. Jurisdictions of the Polish Law of Succession within Last 100 Years), “Global Law Review” 1 (2018) 51–65 法律数据库与去法典化现象 (The Phenomen of Decodification as Fact), “China Review of Administration of Justice” 6 (2017) 196–207
- The praetor as a promoter of bonum commune, “Legal Roots: The International Journal of Roman Law, Legal History and Comparative Law” 3 (2014) 217–231
