= Ewa Thompson =

Polish-American Slavist (born 1937)

Ewa M. Thompson
- Born: Ewa Majewska; 1937 (age 88–89); Kaunas, Lithuania
- Education: University of Warsaw Vanderbilt University
- Known for: Imperial Knowledge: Russian Literature and Colonialism
- Scientific career
- Fields: Slavic studies

Ewa Majewska Thompson (born 1937) is a Polish-American literary scholar, slavicist, and cultural critic. She is Professor Emerita of Slavic Studies at Rice University in Houston, Texas, where she taught from 1970 until her retirement in 2006.

A specialist in Russian literature, Central and Eastern European cultural history, and postcolonial theory, Thompson is recognized as one of the first scholars to systematically apply colonial discourse analysis to Russian imperial culture.

She is best known for her book Imperial Knowledge: Russian Literature and Colonialism (2000), which argues that Russia used literature to justify and normalize its imperial domination of neighboring nations.

She was the editor of the Sarmatian Review.

== Early life and education ==
Thompson was born in 1937 in Kaunas, Lithuania, to a Polish family displaced by the Soviet annexation of Eastern Poland. After the Second World War, she was raised in Gdańsk, Poland, in modest circumstances that she has described as formative for her sensitivity to issues of power, exclusion, and cultural survival.

Initially trained as a pianist, Thompson studied at the Conservatory of Music in Sopot, receiving an M.F.A. in 1963. In the same year, she completed a B.A. in English and Russian at the University of Warsaw. Pursuing her interest in literature and philosophy, she emigrated to the United States for doctoral study, earning a Ph.D. in comparative literature from Vanderbilt University in 1967.

== Career ==
Thompson began teaching in 1967. She held positions at Indiana State University (1967–1968), Indiana University (1968–1970), and the University of Virginia (1973–1974).

In 1970 she joined Rice University in Houston, Texas, where she remained for the bulk of her career. She was promoted to Professor of Slavic Studies in 1979, chaired the department from 1987 to 1990, and became Research Professor of Slavic Studies in 2006. She was named Professor Emerita in 2018.

Thompson also held visiting professorships at the University of Warsaw (1978, 2001) and the University of Bremen (1999).

In 1981 Thompson founded Sarmatian Review, a quarterly devoted to Polish and Central European studies, which she edited until 2017. The journal provided a long-standing English-language platform for scholarship on the region.

She has served on editorial boards including Studies in Twentieth Century Literature, Chesterton Review, Modern Age, Intercollegiate Review, South Central Review, Znaki Czasu, and the Slavic and East European Journal. From 2009 to 2015 she was an area editor of the World Literary Encyclopedia.

Thompson and her late husband, mathematician James Thompson, endowed the John Paul II Institute at the University of St. Thomas in Houston with a $200,000 gift.

== Research ==
Thompson's early works compared Russian Formalism with Anglo-American New Criticism (Russian Formalism and Anglo-American New Criticism, 1971).

She later explored themes of religious irrationalism and cultural archetypes in Understanding Russia: The Holy Fool in Russian Culture (1987; revised 2001).

In April 2022, Thompson delivered a lecture titled “Non-Germanic Central Europe – Can Christian Europe Survive Without It?” at the St. John Paul II Institute of Culture at the Angelicum in Rome.

In 2023, Thompson contributed the Introduction to Paweł Włodkowic, Writings (1416–1432): The Struggle for the Self-Determination of Central Europe, published by the St. John Paul II Institute of Culture (Rome: AngelicuM University Press).

Her most influential work, Imperial Knowledge: Russian Literature and Colonialism (2000), applied postcolonial discourse analysis to Russian imperial culture. In this book she argued that Russian literature often functioned as a tool of empire, legitimizing conquest and suppressing the historical memory of non-Russian nations. The recurring trope of the powerless “little man” in Russian literature discouraged notions of civic agency and political freedom.

== Post-colonialism ==
Thompson's book Imperial Knowledge: Russian Literature and Colonialism was published in 2000. In it, she strongly asserted the need for revising textual practices around Russian literature that had legitimized colonial practices more brutal than what she called "canonical" colonial practices legitimated in British and French literature. She linked the silence about Russian hegemony about Central European colonies and colonial practices with a Western fascination with Russia, and subsequently with the Soviet Union. Although the book did not initially receive much recognition, it has been rediscovered and reinvigorated following the publication of Slavist Clare Cavanagh's works.

== Views and commentary ==
Thompson has written widely in both scholarly and popular venues, often linking literature, politics, and cultural survival.

=== On Russian culture and empire ===
Thompson has been critical of the enduring imperial orientation of Russian culture, contending that Russian society “lacks an epistemological foundation” for self-criticism and remains shaped by expansionist narratives. In recent writings she has argued that Russia's invasion of Ukraine reflects long-standing cultural patterns rather than a temporary political aberration.

=== On Ukraine and nationalism ===
Thompson distinguishes between what she calls “aggressive nationalisms” of Russia and other empires and the “defensive nationalism” of Poland and smaller Central European states, aimed at preserving cultural identity. She has been a strong advocate of Ukrainian independence and argues that preserving Ukraine's sovereignty is essential for a free Europe.

=== On language and Polish identity ===
In her “Seen from Houston” columns, Thompson has addressed debates about prepositions in Polish usage (e.g. in Ukraine vs. on Ukraine), contending that linguistic prescriptivism imposed from outside reflects cultural insecurity. She has also argued that Polish schools should unapologetically serve the function of Polonization, by teaching Polish children their national history and heritage, while allowing minorities to draw their own conclusions.

=== On Gogol and Bulgakov ===
In interviews she has described Nikolai Gogol as a “frontier writer” whose language choice and career ambitions tied him to Russian literature, despite his Ukrainian origins. She argues that Gogol's Taras Bulba reveals hostility to Ukrainian nationhood, though his Ukrainian tales are “so beautiful” and represent Ukraine rather than Russia. She regards Mikhail Bulgakov as an “interesting novelist” but not central to Ukrainian cultural identity, suggesting that his work should not be claimed for Ukraine merely because of biographical ties.

== Awards and honors ==
- 2022 – Trans-Atlantyk Award, for promoting Polish literature in the English-speaking world
- 2015 – Literary Prize, Association of Polish Writers Abroad (London)
- 2014 – Medal of “Courage and Integrity, Polska Wielki Projekt Congress, Warsaw
- 2012 – Civic Achievement Award, Polish American Historical Association
- 2004 – W. and Nelli Turzanski Award for scholarly achievement (Toronto)
- 2003 – Will Herberg Award for Outstanding Faculty Service, Intercollegiate Studies Institute. (Wilmington, DE)
- 2002 – Order of Merit of the Republic of Poland, awarded by President Aleksander Kwaśniewski

== Selected publications ==
=== Books ===
- Thompson, E.M (2011). Russian Formalism and Anglo-American New Criticism: A Comparative Study. De Proprietatibus Litterarum. Series Maior. Berlin: De Gruyter. ISBN 978-90-279-1845-1.
- Thompson, E. M (1979). Witold Gombrowicz. Twayne's World Authors Series, 510. Gale (Firm). Boston, Mass: Twayne Publishers. ISBN 978-0-8057-6351-5.
- Thompson, E. M (1987). Understanding Russia: the holy fool in Russian culture. Lanham: Univ. Press of America. ISBN 978-0-8191-6271-7.
- Thompson, E.M, ed. (1991). Search for Self-Definition in Russian Literature. Utrecht Publications in General and Comparative Literature. Amsterdam: John Benjamins Publishing Company. ISBN 978-90-272-2213-8.
- Thompson, E. M (2000). Imperial knowledge: Russian literature and colonialism. Contributions to the study of world literature. Westport, Conn. London: Greenwood Press. ISBN 978-0-313-31311-0.

=== Book chapters ===
- Thompson, E.M (2023). "Introduction". Writings (1416-1432): the struggle for the self-determination of Central Europe (Paweł Włodkowic). Rome : Warsaw: Angelicum University Press; Fundacja Świętego Mikołaja. ISBN 978-83-67065-44-3.
- Thompson, E.M (31 December 2018), "Sarmatism, or the Secrets of Polish Essentialism", Being Poland, University of Toronto Press, pp. 1–29, doi:10.3138/9781442622517-004, ISBN 978-1-4426-2251-7
- Thompson, E.M (2011). "Postcolonial Russia". In Poddar, Prem; Patke, Rajeev S.; Jensen, Lars (eds.). A historical companion to postcolonial literatures: continental Europe and its empires. Edinburgh: Edinburgh University Press. ISBN 978-0-7486-2394-5.
- Thompson, E. M (5 May 2021), "Russian Literature and Imperialism: The Late Soviet and Early Post-Soviet Periods", Reconstructing the Canon, Routledge, pp. 243–258, doi:10.4324/9781003153795-10, ISBN 978-1-003-15379-5
- Thompson, E.M (1993). "Tradition and modernity in Poland". In Pula, J. S.; Biskupski, M. B. (eds.). Poland and Europe: Historical Dimensions. East European Monographs.

=== articles ===
- Thompson, E.M (2019). "The great amputation: Language in the postmodern era". Modern Age. 68 (4): 40–52.
- Thompson, E.M (2015). "Slavic but not Russian: Invisible and mute". Porównania. 16: 9–18. doi:10.14746/p.2015.16.10857.
- Thompson, E. M. (2012). "It is colonialism, after all: Remarks on epistemology. English trans. (2014), Teksty Drugie, 1, 67–82" (PDF). Teksty Drugie. 6: 289–302.
- Thompson, E. M (2010). "Whose discourse? Telling the story in post-communist Poland". The Other Shore: Slavic and East European Cultures Abroad. 1 (1): 1–15.
- Thompson, E.W. "Discourse, empire and memory in postcommunist Russia". New Zealand Slavonic Journal. 37: 155–164.
- "Hollow Words, Shallow Politics | Ewa Thompson". Humanum Review.
- "Can We Communicate? On Epistemological Incompatibilities in Contemporary Academic Discourse". delibeRatio.
