= Let's Paint Catholicism Again =

Polish religious art restoration project

Let's Paint Catholicism Again (Polish: Namalować katolicyzm od nowa) is a project aimed at renewing Western sacral painting, introducing high-quality contemporary painting to the Catholic churches and revitalizing the artistic patronage. Its originator was Dariusz Karłowicz. It was initiated by three cooperating institutions: Saint Nicholas Foundation, Political Theology and St. John Paul II Institute of Culture (at Angelicum University). The project consists of a range of initiatives, including a book series Let's Paint Catholicism Again, seminars, conferences, lectures, and art exhibitions.

Each year a Mystery of the Rosary is selected. A group of invited Polish painters create paintings illustrating the Mystery. The process of painting is preceded by workshops aimed at broadening the artists' knowledge in the field of theology, philosophy, and art history. The invited lecturers have included Rev. Prof. Marek Starowieyski, Fr. Jarosław Kupczak OP, Anna Kilian, Bazyli Degórski, Izabela Rutkowska, Rev. bishop Jacek Grzybowski, Fr. Paweł Trzopek OP, Sr. Joanna Nowińska, Fr. Dominik Jurczak OP. The workshops took place in absentia at the Benedictine Abbey in Tyniec, at former monastery complexes in Hebdów and Wigry.

== Artists ==
Each year, paintings are being created by Jarosław Modzelewski, Ignacy Czwartos, Beata Stankiewicz, Krzysztof Klimek, Jacek Hajnos OP, Wojciech Głogowski, Artur Wąsowski, Grzegorz Wnęk, Bogna Podbielska, and Jacek Dłużewski.

In every edition, one painter of the younger generation takes part. So far, in chronological order, Wincenty Czwartos, Michał Żądło, Ewa Czwartos, and Karolina Żądło have participated.

== Art exhibitions ==
=== I Edition – the Divine Mercy image ===
The first Edition of the project took place in the Basilica of the Holy Trinity in Kraków in November 2022 and was inaugurated with an exhibition of 10 paintings of Divine Mercy image. Later, the paintings were exhibited in Warsaw (underground of St. Florian's Cathedral, February–March 2023), Rome (San Salvatore in Lauro, April-May 2023).

=== II Edition – Annunciation ===
In 2023, each artist created two paintings of the Annunciation: a larger one intended for use in churches, and smaller one intended for private worship.

The exhibition took place in the undergrounds of St. Florian's Cathedral in Warsaw (November 2023 - February 2024), San Salvatore in Lauro in Rome (April 2024), St. Sigismundus's church in Częstochowa (July - September 2024), Podlaska Opera and Orchestra house in Białystok (October 2024), and in the Diocesan Museum in Opole (December 2024 - January 2025).

=== III Edition – Visitation ===
For the III Edition, 20 paintings of the Visitation were created. The first exhibition took place in the undergrounds of St. Florian's Cathedral in Warsaw (November 2024 - January 2025), the Community Centre in Bielsko-Biała (October 2024) and San Salvetore in Lauro (October 2025).

=== IV Edition – Nativity ===
After taking part in workshops on the Nativity of Jesus, the painters illustrated the third Joyful Mystery of the Rosary, creating two images: the Nativity and of Adoration of the Child Jesus. The exhibition is planned for November 2025 and will take place in the St. Florian's Cathedral in Warsaw.

=== V Edition – Presentation ===
The artists are currently preparing theologically for illustrating the fourth Mystery, the Presentation of Jesus. The exhibition is planned for 2026.

== Accompanying events ==
The event was accompanied by the book series "Let's Paint Catholicism Again" – a book series published by Political Theology, aiming at popularising knowledge in the field of culture, arts and theology.

1. Izabela Rutkowska, Przez zasłonę ciała (Through the Veil of the Body). Warsaw, 2022.
2. Priest Janusz Pasierb, Kult i kultura (Cult and culture). Warsaw, 2024.
3. Alain Besançon, Zakazany obraz. Intelektualna historia ikonoklazmu ("The forbidden image: an intellectual history of iconoclasm), the first polish translation of L'image interdite: une histoire intellectuelle de l'iconoclasme.
