= Sarmatian Review =

Former academic journal

- Discipline: Slavic studies
- Language: English

Publication details
- Former name(s): Houston Sarmatian
- History: 1981–2017
- Frequency: Triannually

Standard abbreviations
- ISO 4: Sarmatian Rev.

Indexing
- ISSN: 1059-5872

Links
- Journal homepage

The Sarmatian Review (formerly The Houston Sarmatian) was a triannual peer-reviewed academic journal, published from 1981 to 2017 by the nonprofit Polish Institute of Houston, covering Slavistics (the study of the histories, cultures, and societies of the Slavic nations of Central, Eastern, and Southern Europe).

The editor-in-chief was Ewa Thompson. From 1992 an abbreviated web edition was available, free of charge, six to ten weeks after the publication of the print edition.

== History ==
The journal was established in 1981, under the auspices of the Houston chapter of the Polish Institute of Arts and Sciences of America, as The Houston Sarmatian, obtaining its subsequent title in 1988. In 1999 a nonprofit public foundation, the Polish Institute of Houston, was formed as a cultural and educational institution with the chief purpose of continuing the journal's publication.

The journal took its name from "Sarmatia", a semi-legendary appellation for the Polish–Lithuanian Commonwealth, a multicultural state that, from the 16th to the 18th century, included most of Eastern Europe.

== Content ==
The journal concerned itself with the Slavic countries (most prominently Poland, Russia, and Ukraine), the post-Soviet period, American and European ethnic questions, and matters related to mass media, higher education, literature, government, religion, and politics.

The journal published articles, reviews, and occasionally samples of poetry.

== See also ==
- The Polish Review
- Sarmatism
- Slavic Review
