= Roman Longchamps de Bérier =

professor Roman Longchamps de Bérier
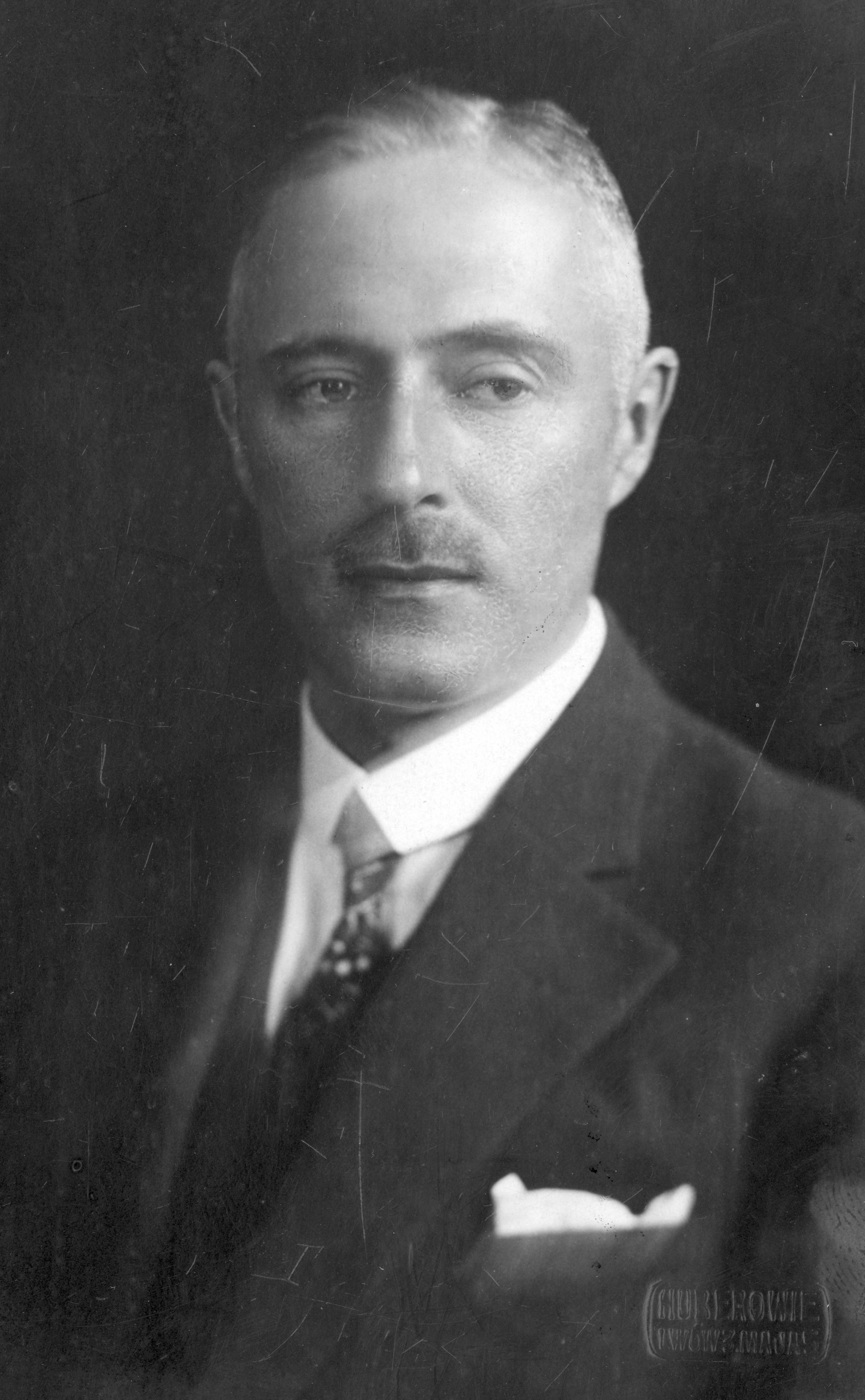
- Born: 9 August 1883; Lwów
- Died: 4 July 1941 (aged 57); Lwów

Roman Longchamps de Bérier (9 August 1883 – 4 July 1941) was a Polish lawyer and university professor, one of the most notable specialists in civil law of his generation and the last rector of the Jan Kazimierz University of Lwów before Nazi occupation. He was murdered in what became known as the Massacre of Lwów professors.

== Biography ==
Roman Longchamps de Bérier was born in 1883 in Lwów (now Lviv), then a city in Austro-Hungarian Galicia, to a notable family of distant French extraction who left France in the 17th century. The family name gave its moniker to one of the suburbs of the city, "Lonszanówka" (modern Lonsanivka). After finishing his studies at Lemberg university he became a specialist in civil law. In 1918 he served as a volunteer during the Battle of Lwów (1918) and the ensuing Polish-Ukrainian War.

In 1920 he became a professor at the Faculty of Law of the renamed Jan Kazimierz University of Lwów. Two years later he was appointed member of the Commission of Codification of the Republic of Poland, where he took part in preparation of Polish civil law. In 1931 he became a member of the Polish Academy of Skills and in 1936 he was appointed member of the Competention Tribunal, one of the bodies central to solving conflicts between the legislative, executive and judicial branches of government.

After the outbreak of the Polish Defensive War of 1939 he was one of the co-founders of the "Civilian Committee of the Defence of Lwów" that organized the defensive measures for the city during the siege of that city. After the city surrendered to the Soviets and was annexed by the USSR he was relieved of his office, but remained one of the professors of the University. After the outbreak of the Russo-German War on 4 July 1941 he was arrested by the Nazis and murdered in what became known as the massacre of Lwów professors. Specifically, he was shot dead while at a coffee with Tadeusz Boy-Żeleński, who was also killed at the same time despite being absent from the official proscribed list. Among the victims of the massacre were also three of his sons: Bronisław (b. 1916), Zygmunt (b. 1918) and Kazimierz (b. 1923).
