= Dariusz Gawin =

Polish historian and sociologist

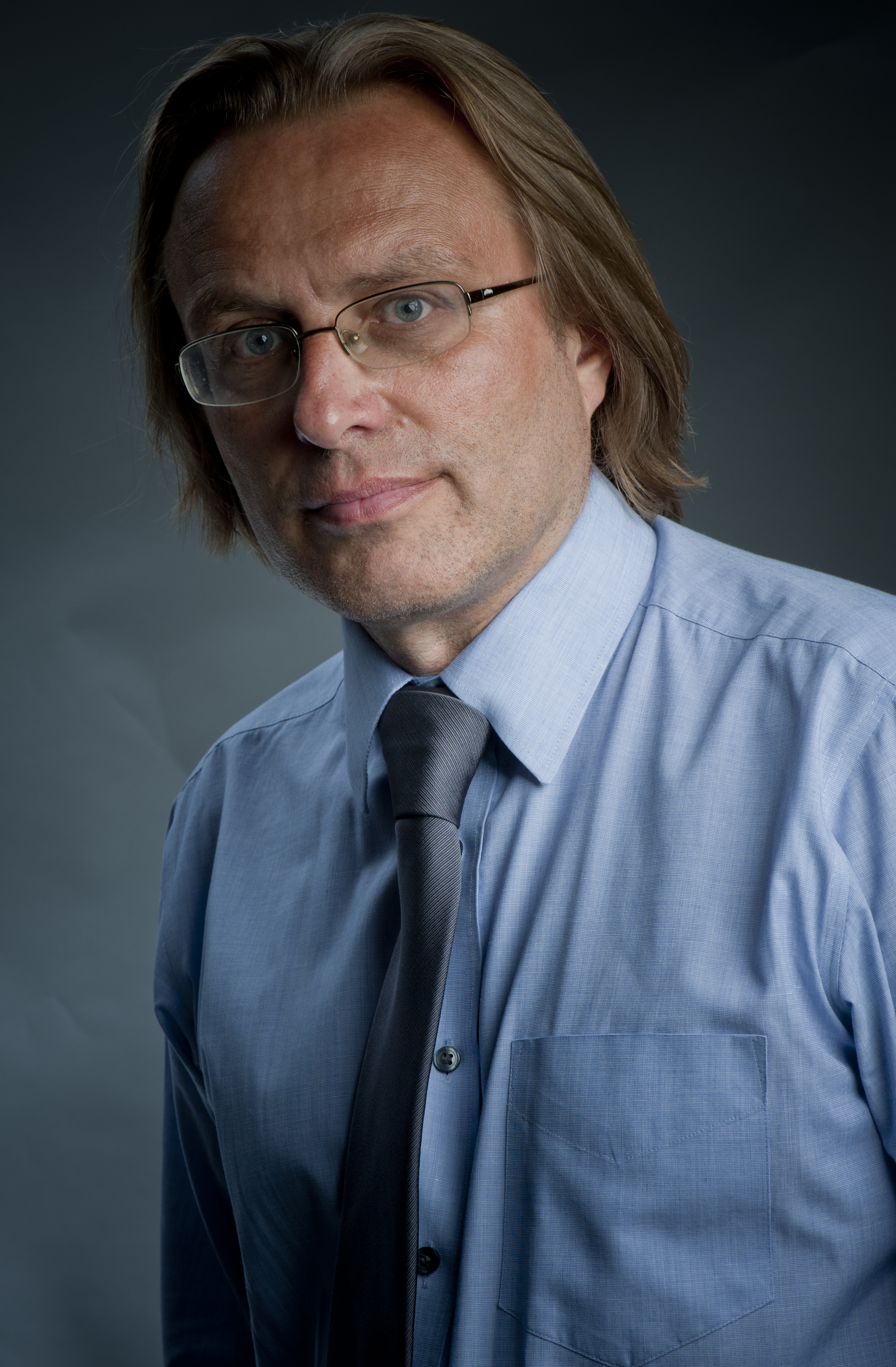
Dariusz Gawin

Dariusz Gawin (born February 2, 1964) is a Polish historian and sociologist, deputy director of the Warsaw Uprising Museum (Muzeum Powstania Warszawskiego) dedicated to the memory of the Warsaw Uprising of 1944, and located in the Wola district of Warsaw, Poland. Gawin serves as an Adiunkt at the Institute of Philosophy and Sociology of the Polish Academy of Sciences. He is a contributor to leading Polish magazines such as Przegląd Polityczny, Res Publica Nowa, Tygodnik Powszechny and Rzeczpospolita, as well as historical and scientific journals such as Teologia Polityczna and Krytyka Polityczna. He was the host of a TV programme Trzeci punkt widzenia at TVP Kultura.

He is regarded as historian of political and social ideas such as patriotism, nationalism, antisemitism, totalitarianism and others. He is a frequent moderator in conferences related to these subjects. As an Adiunkt at PAN, Gawin is also the director of its Institute of Civic Society (Zakład Społeczeństwa Obywatelskiego, IFiS PAN), as well as the author of several books. In 2006 he received the Andrzej Kijowski Award for his book Polska, wieczny romans published in 2005 by Ośrodek Myśli Politycznej.

== Selected publications ==
- Dariusz Gawin (2005), Polska, wieczny romans: O Zwiazkach Literatury i Polityki w XX Wieku, Ośrodek Myśli Politycznej (OMP), ISBN 8389500167.
- Dariusz Gawin (2006), Blask i gorycz wolności: eseje o polskim doświadczeniu wolności, Ośrodek Myśli Politycznej, 248 pages. ISBN 8360125708.
- Dariusz Gawin (2007), Granice demokracji liberalnej: szkice z filozofii, Ośrodek Myśli Politycznej, 272 pages. ISBN 8360125236.
- Dariusz Gawin (2013), Wielki zwrot, Znak, 384 pages. ISBN 8324021132.
