= Dariusz Karłowicz =

Dariusz Karłowicz (born 5 July 1964) is a Polish philosopher, university lecturer, columnist, and a book publisher. Recipient of the Officer's Cross Order of Polonia Restituta for cultural accomplishments (2023) and the Cavaler's Cross Order of Polonia Restituta for charity work (2012).

The president of the St. Nicolas Foundation (Fundacja Świętego Mikołaja) - an NGO involved in charitable, educational, and scientific activity. An Editor-in-chief of the Polish philosophical magazine "Political Theology" ("Teologia Polityczna") which analyzes the connections and relationships between philosophy, religion, and politics. Originator of religious-painting project "Let's paint catholicism again" and curator of his exhibitions. Lecturer in political philosophy at the Cardinal Stefan Wyszyński University in Warsaw. Co-author of a weekly television program "Trzeci Punkt Widzenia" on the channel TVP Kultura. A regular columnist in the weekly Sieci and member of the policy council for the magazine First Things (the Polish edition 2006-2008), author and editor of books and articles. The winner of the Andrzej Kijowski Prize for the book "Koniec snu Konstantyna" (2005). Was awarded by the .

== Books in English ==
English publications edited for Angelicum:

- Thinking with St. John Paul II (2020/2021), Rome-Warsaw 2021.
- Thinking with St. John Paul II (2021/2022), Rome-Warsaw 2024.
- Thinking with St. John Paul II (2022/2023), Rome-Warsaw 2025

Books translated into English:

- The Archparadox of Death. Martyrdom as a philosophical category, Polish edition published by Znak, Kraków 2000, and by Fronda, Warszawa 2007, English edition published by Peter Lang, Frankfurt 2016.
- Socrates and Other Saints, published by Fronda, Warszawa 2005, English edition published by Cascade Books, Wipf and Stock Publishers, Eugene, Oregon 2017.
