= List of Polish sculptors =

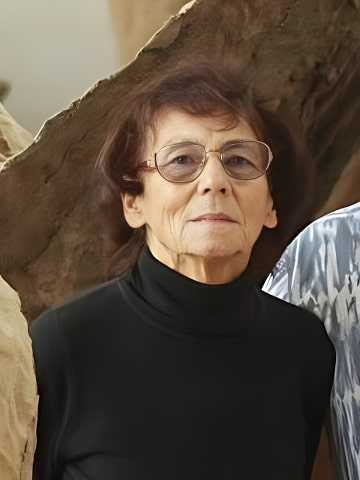
Magdalena Abakanowicz

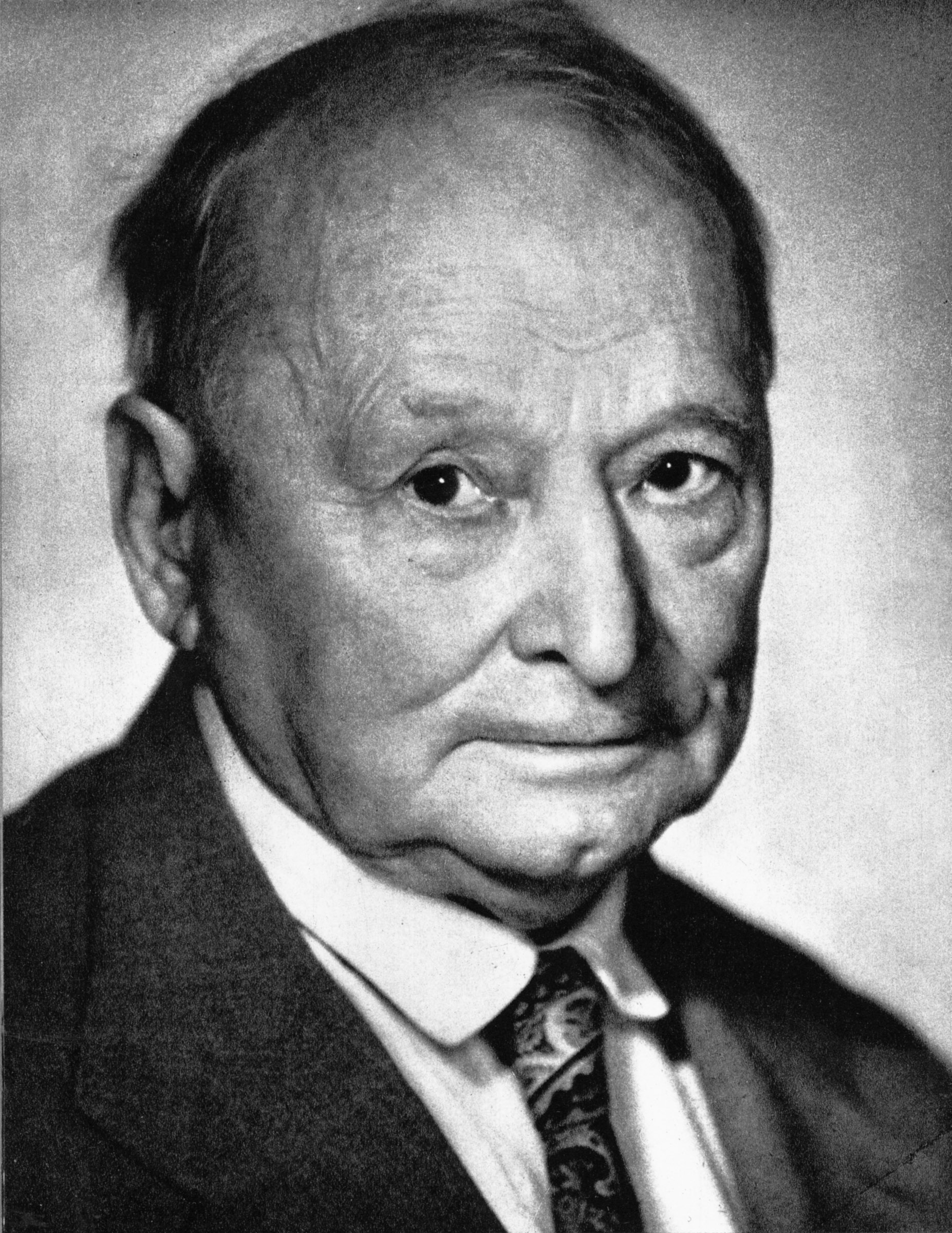
Xawery Dunikowski

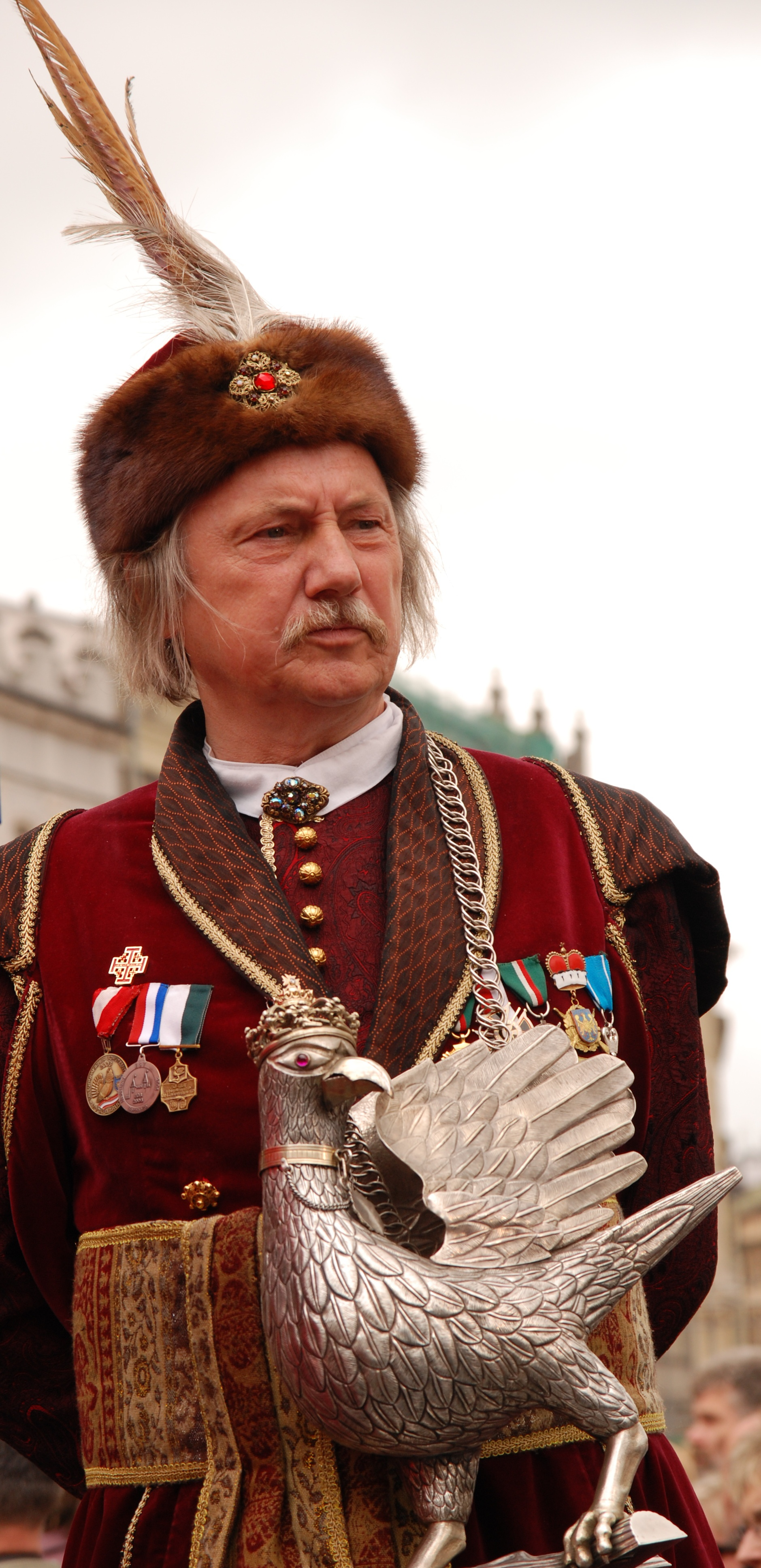
Czesław Dźwigaj

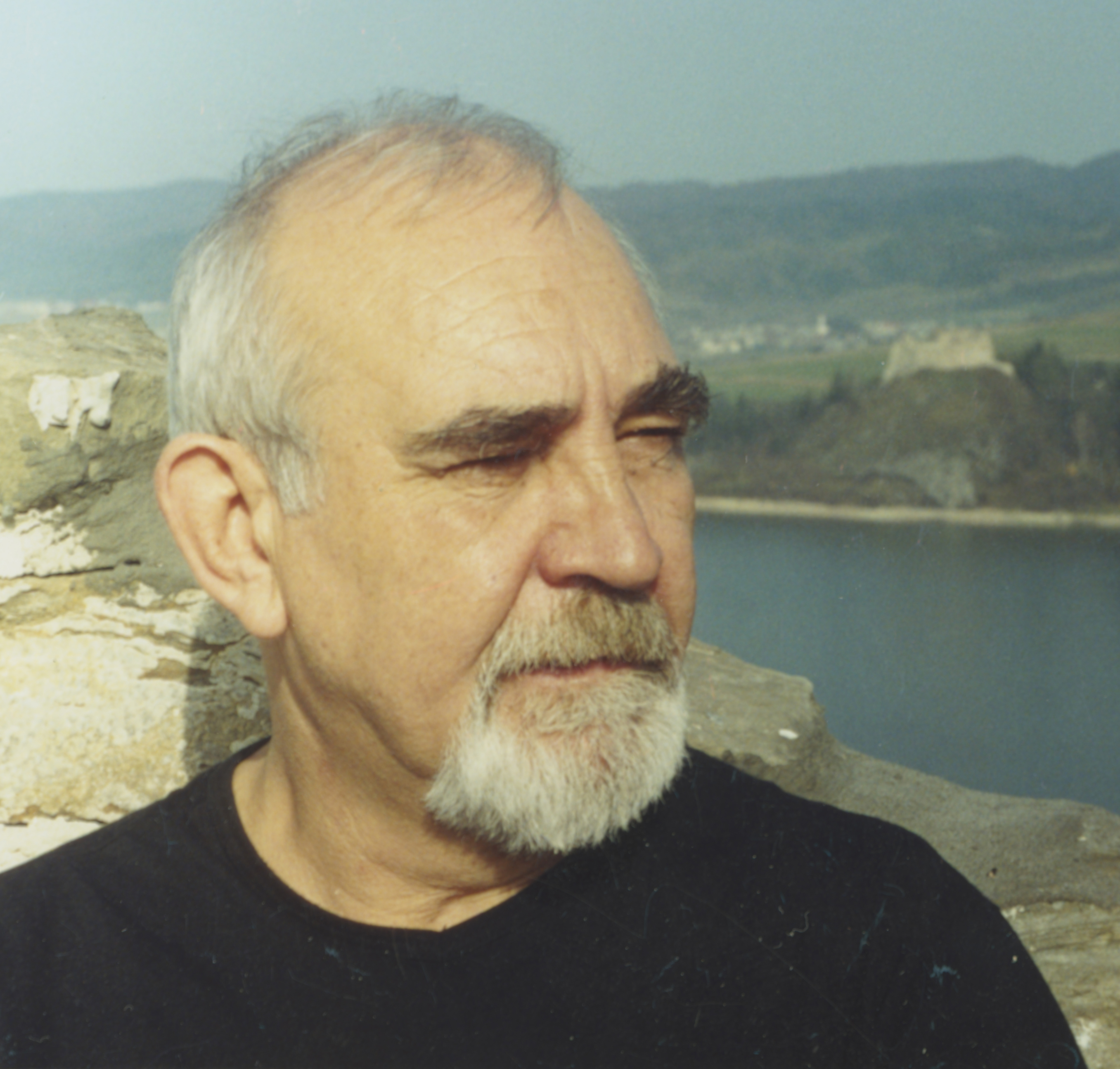
Wojciech Gryniewicz

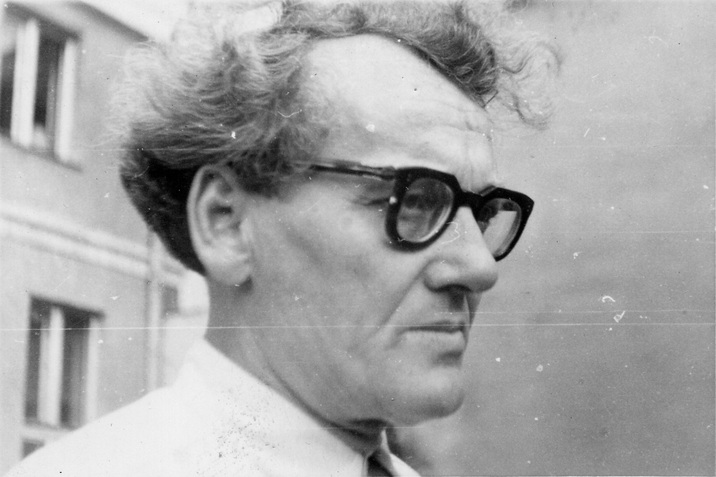
Józef Gosławski

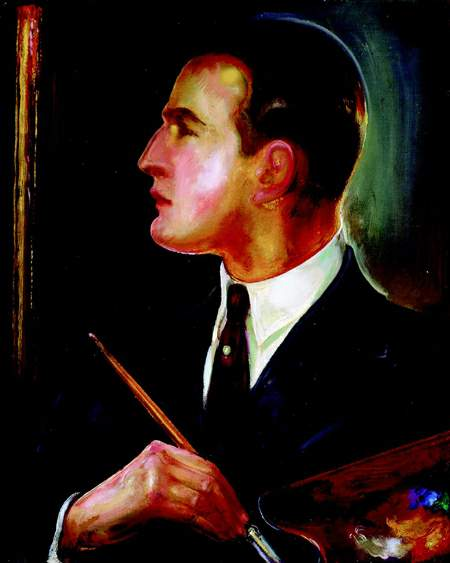
Gustaw Gwozdecki

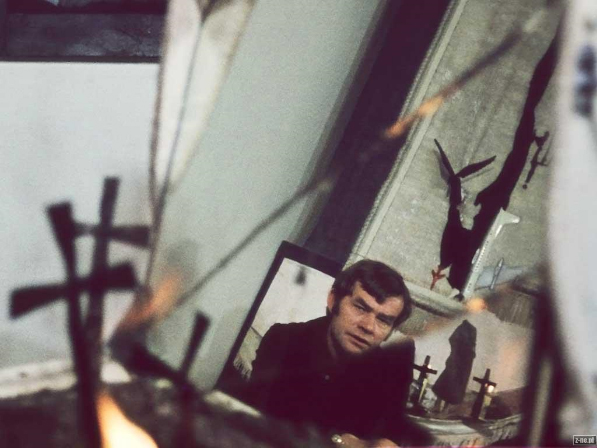
Władysław Hasior

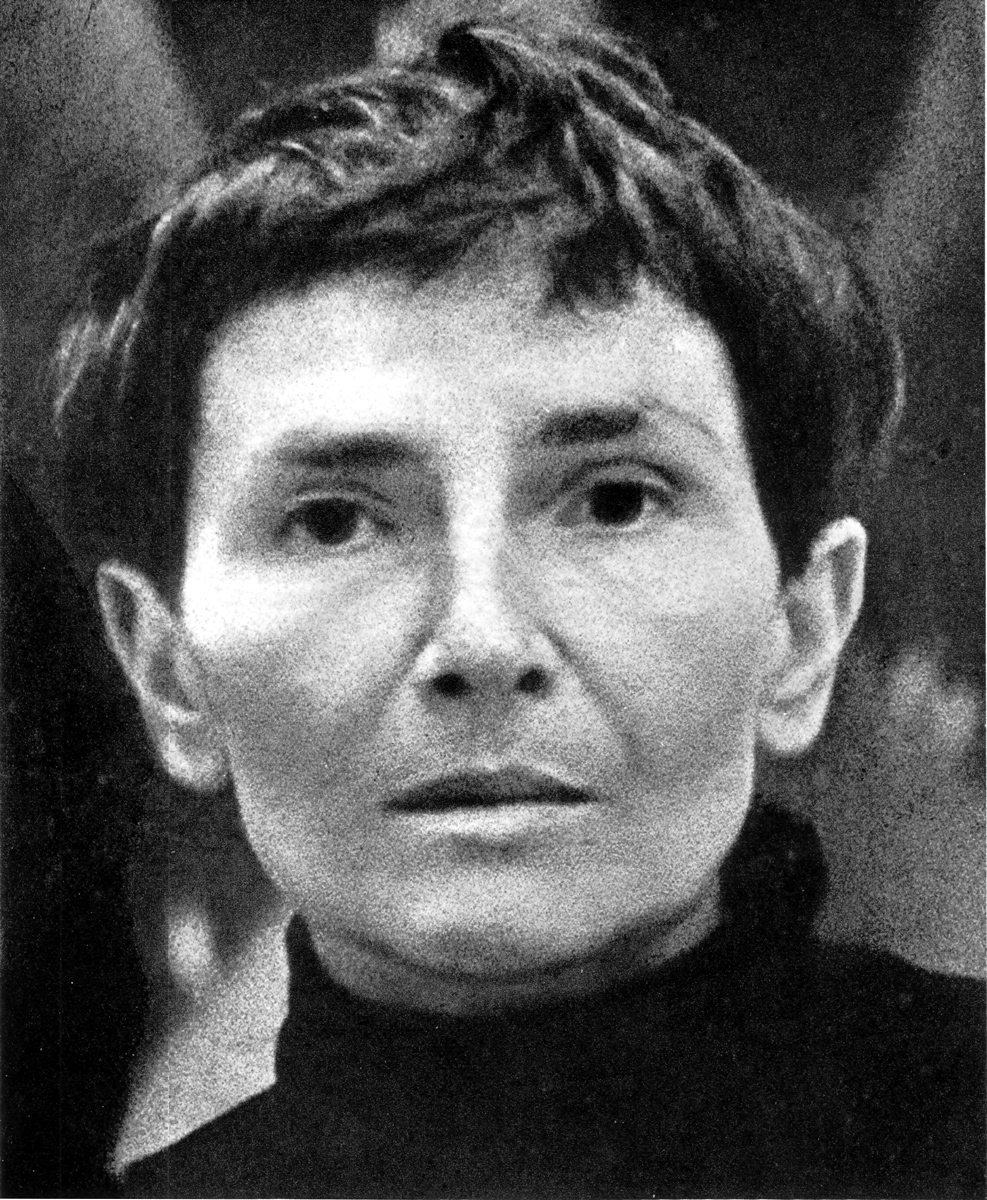
Maria Jarema

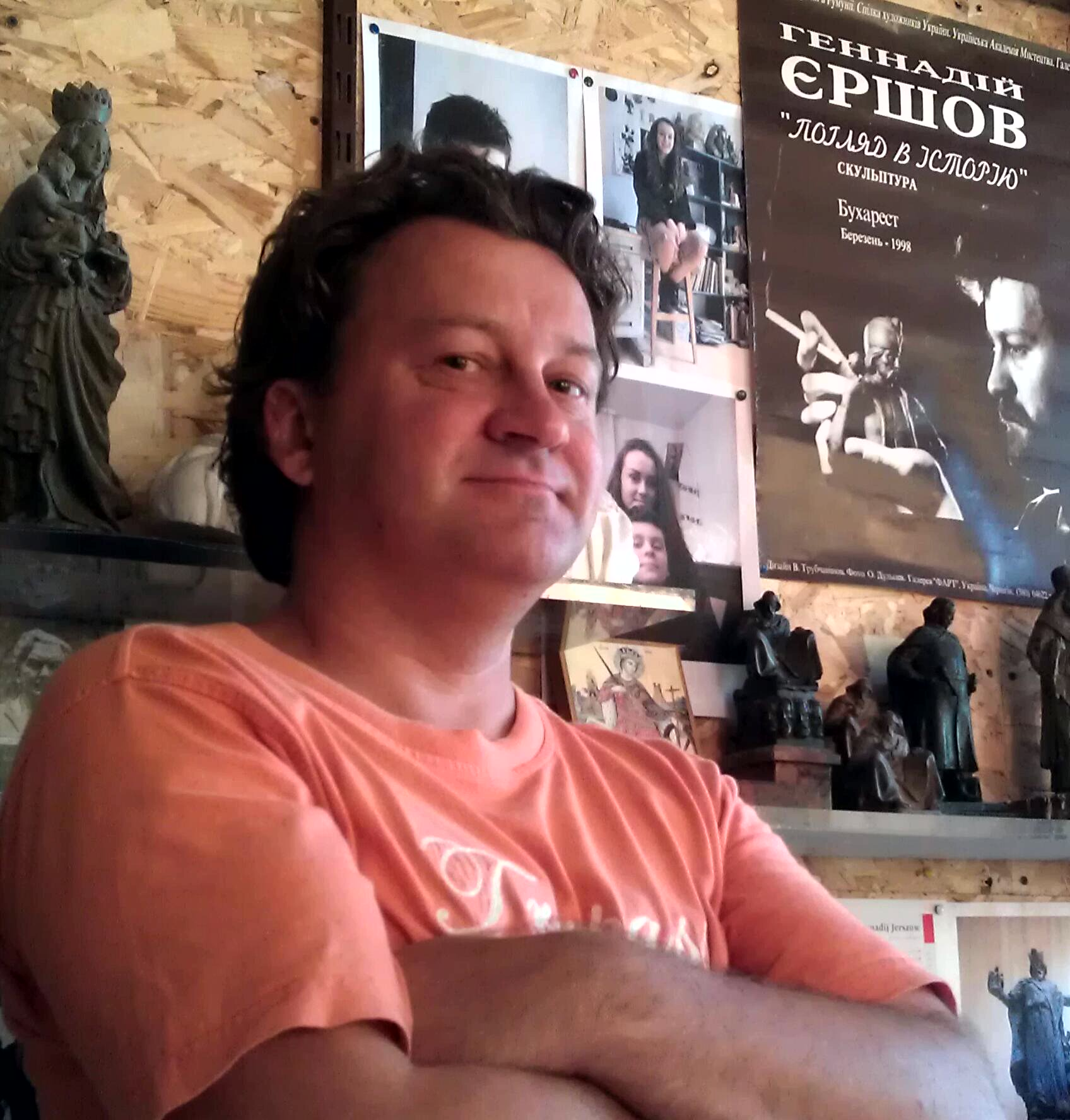
Giennadij Jerszow

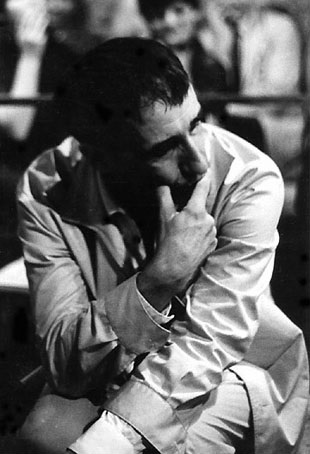
Tadeusz Kantor

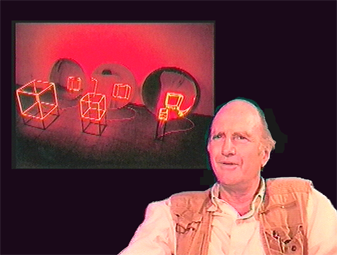
Piotr Kowalski

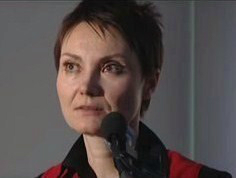
Katarzyna Kozyra

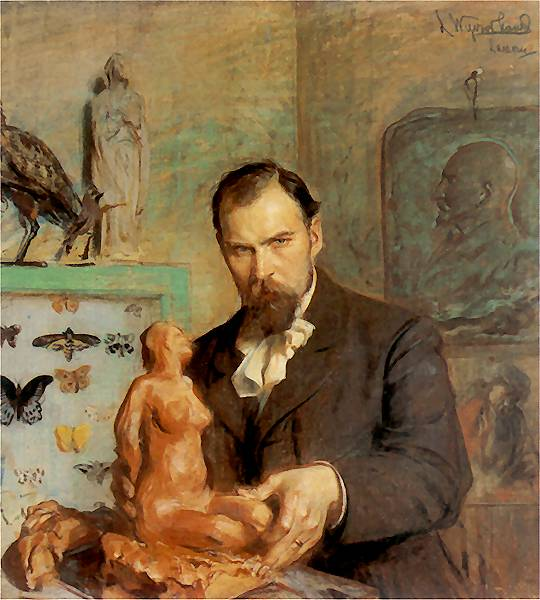
Konstanty Laszczka

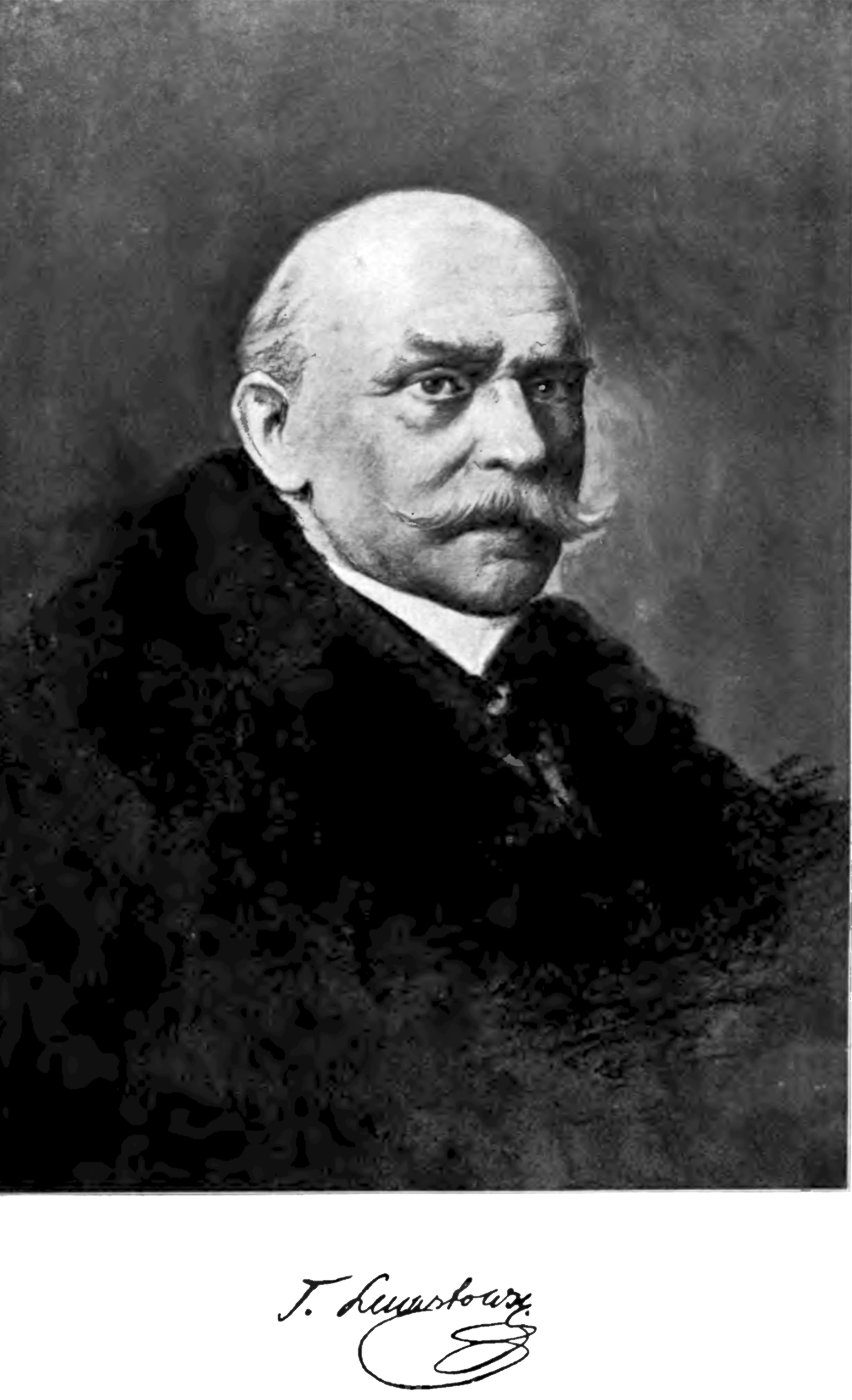
Teofil Lenartowicz

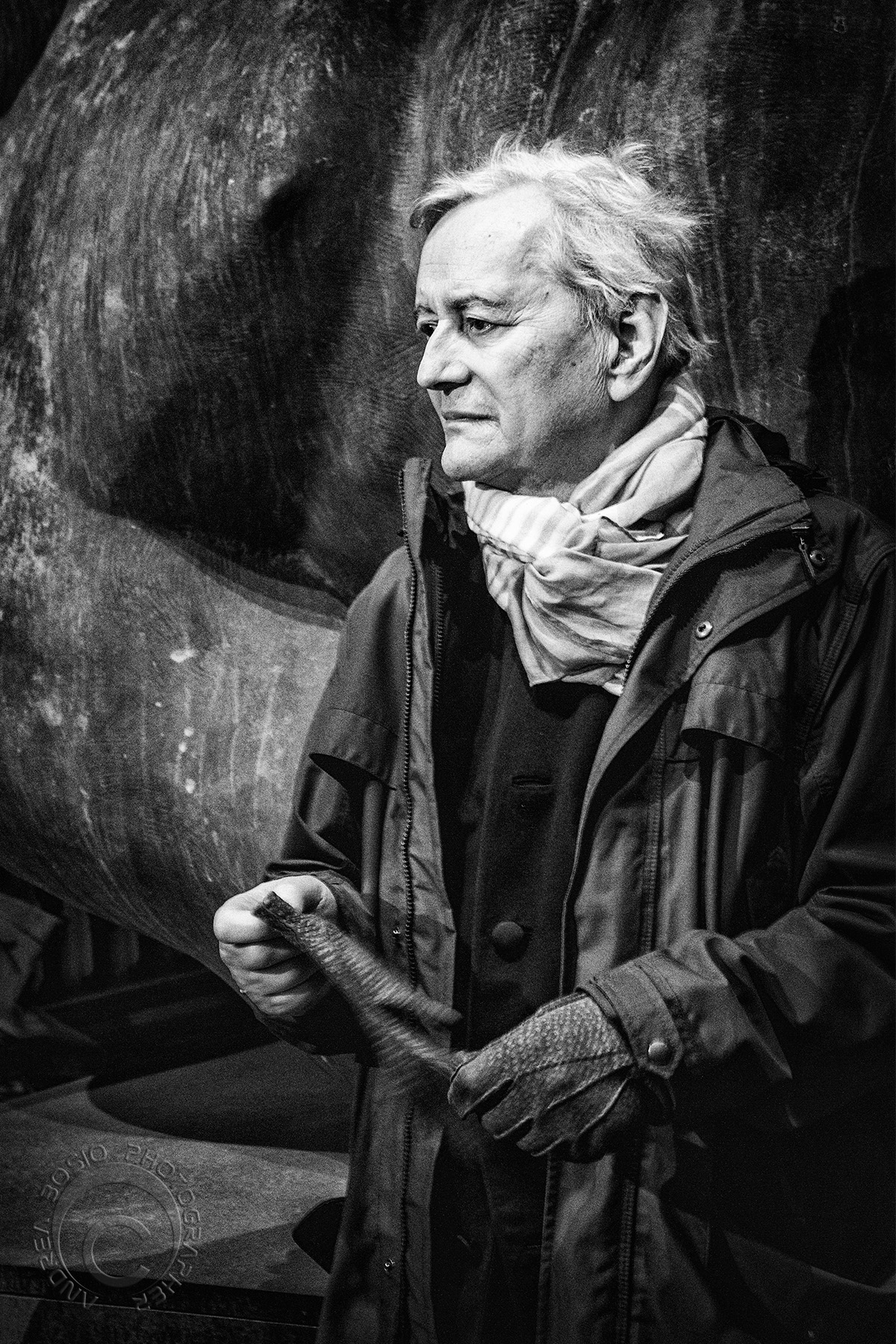
Igor Mitoraj

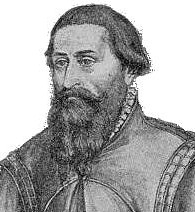
Wit Stwosz

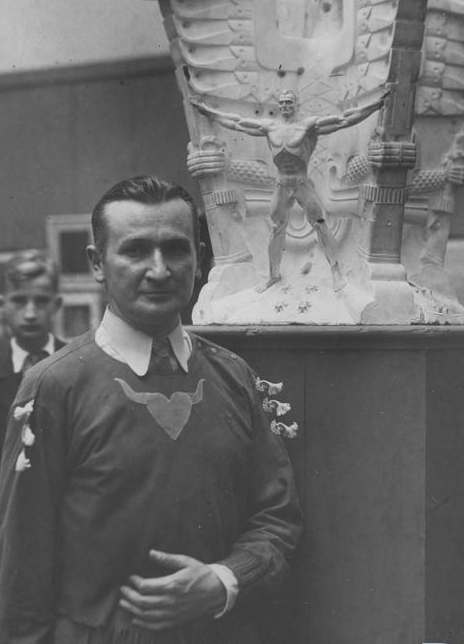
Stanisław Szukalski

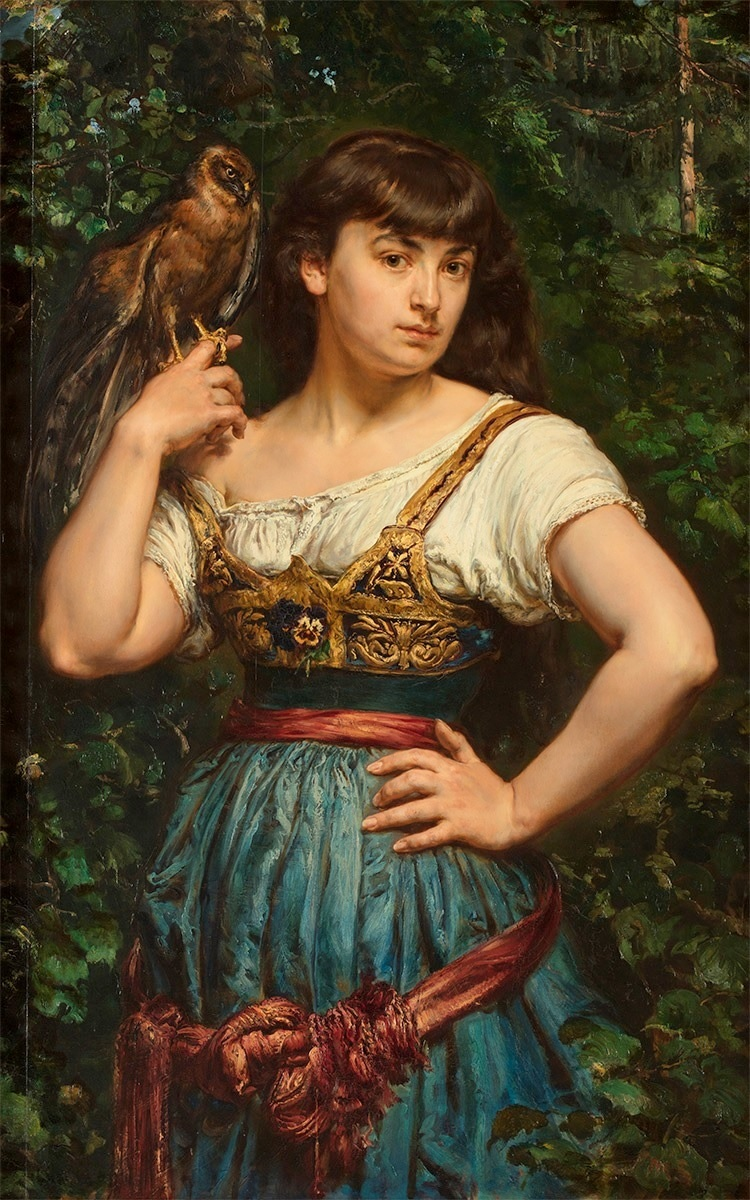
Helena Unierzyska

The following is a list of sculptors from Poland:

A B C D E F G H I J K L M N O P R S T U V W Z Ł Ś Ż

== A ==
- Magdalena Abakanowicz
- Harry Abend
- Wiesław Adamski
- Kazimierz Adamski
- Paweł Althamer
- Sylwester Ambroziak

== B ==
- Zofia Baltarowicz-Dzielińska
- Mirosław Bałka
- Fryderyk Bauman
- Zdzisław Beksiński
- Jan Berdyszak
- Bolesław Biegas
- Tadeusz Breyer
- Alicja Buławka-Fankidejska

== C ==
- Michał Ceptowski
- Bronisław Chromy (1925–2017),

== D ==
- Karl Duldig (1902–1986), born in what is now Poland
- Xawery Dunikowski
- Krystyna Dąbrowska
- Czesław Dźwigaj

== F ==
- Wojciech Fangor
- Antoni Frąckiewicz

== G ==
- Henryk Glicenstein
- Izabella Godlewska
- Chaim Goldberg
- Józef Gosławski
- Wojciech Gryniewicz
- Zbylut Grzywacz

== H ==
- Władysław Hasior
- Zbigniew Horbowy

== J ==
- Zuzanna Janin
- Maria Jarema
- Jerzy Jarnuszkiewicz
- Kazimierz Jelski
- Giennadij Jerszow

== K ==
- Tadeusz Kantor
- Jerzy Kenar
- Katarzyna Kobro
- Marian Konieczny
- Mateusz Kossior
- Adam Kossowski
- Katarzyna Kozyra
- Józef Antoni Kraus
- Wojciech Kucharski
- Henryk Kuna
- Baltazar Kuncz

== L ==
- Konstanty Laszczka

== M ==
- Paweł Maliński
- Leonard Marconi
- Marian Hess
- Agata Materowicz
- Igor Mitoraj

== N ==
- Dorota Nieznalska

== P ==
- Krzysztof Perwanger
- Wojciech Pietranik
- Franciszek Pinck
- Jan Jerzy Plersch

== R ==
- Kazimierz Rafalik
- Jan Chryzostom Redler
- Jan Regulski
- Wojciech Rojowski
- Marcin Rożek

== S ==
- Anton Schimser
- Monika Sosnowska
- Stanisław Stwosz
- Wit Stwosz
- Alina Szapocznikow
- Jan Sawka
- Stanisław Szukalski

== T ==
- Jakub Tatarkiewicz
- Karol Tchorek
- Wiktor Tołkin
- Piotr Triebler

== U ==
- Witold Urbanowicz

== W ==
- Jan de Weryha-Wysoczański
- Edward Wittig
- Antoni Wiwulski

== Z ==
- August Zamoyski
- Barbara Zbrożyna

== Ż ==
- Teresa Żarnowerówna

== See also ==
- Art
- List of Polish artists
- List of Polish graphic designers
- List of Polish photographers
- List of Polish contemporary artists
- List of Polish painters
