= Katharina Magdalena Brückner =

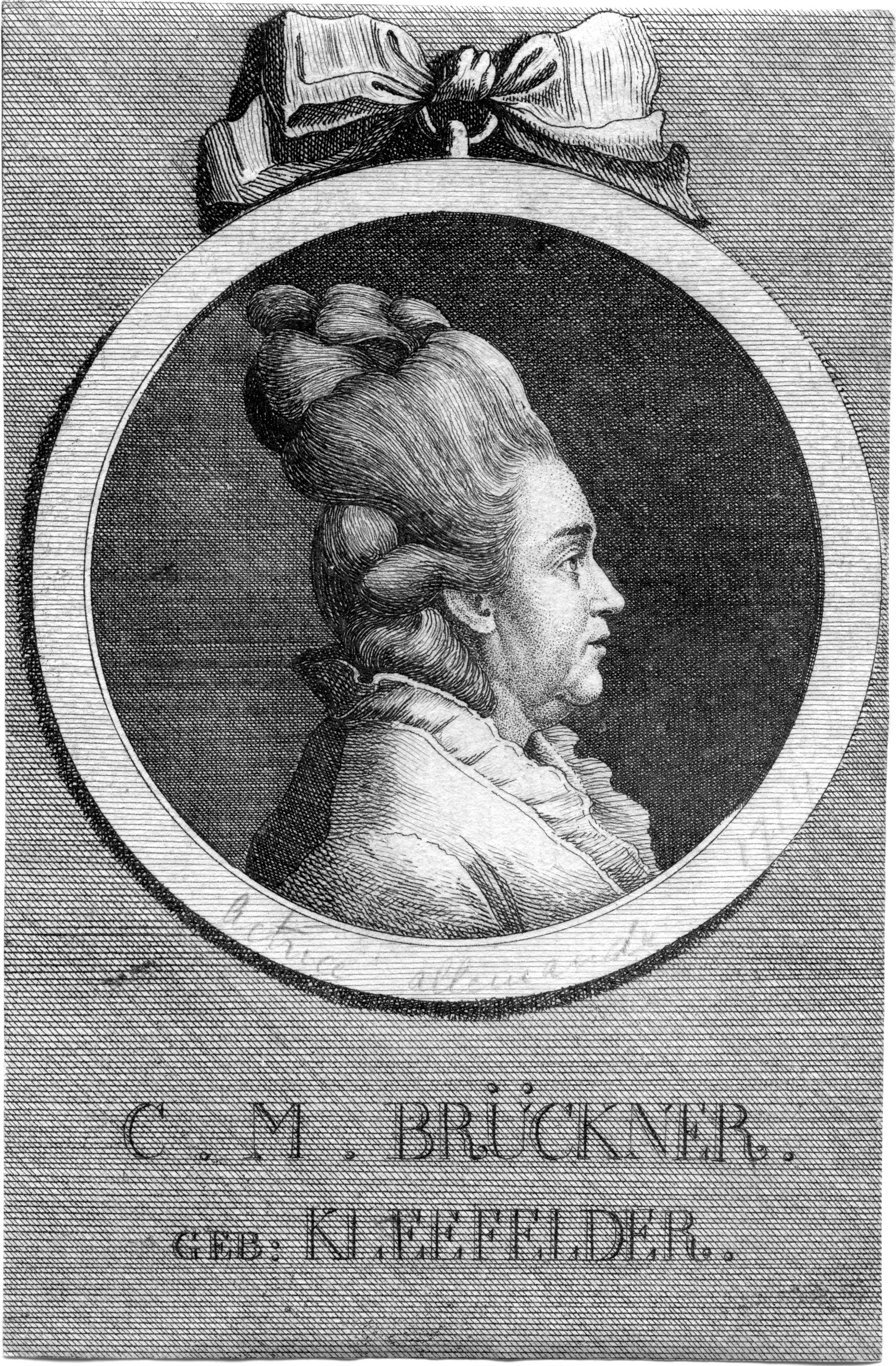
Engraved Portrait of Bruckner

Katharina Magdalena Brückner (1719-1804) was a German stage actress. She was a celebrated actress in Friederike Caroline Neuber's acting troupe and the Koch theater. She married the actor Johann Friedrich Brückner in 1756. From 1775 to 1791, she was a prominent member of the Döbbelinsches Theater in Berlin. She was favored by the king, who often granted her gifts as a token of his admiration and awarded her a full pension when she retired in 1791.
