= Kosior =

Kosior (sometimes spelled Kossior) is a surname of Polish origin. Notable people include:

- Mateusz Kossior, 16th-century Polish painter and sculptor
- Stanisław Kosior (1889–1939), Soviet politician
