= Kazimierz Adamski =

Polish sculptor

Kazimierz Adamski (born 1964) is a Polish sculptor.

== Biography ==
He studied at the Jan Matejko Academy of Fine Arts from 1988 to 1993. He created the Old Testament prophet statues in the Krasiczyn Castle in Krasiczyn near Przemyśl. He is also designer of the coin "Cracoviae Merenti" and statuettes in his native Kraków.

== See also ==
- List of Polish sculptors
