= Franciszek Jaźwiecki =

Polish painter (1900–1946)

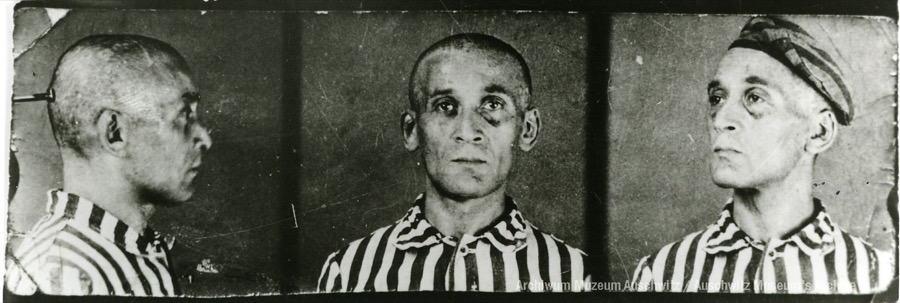
- Born: December 23, 1900; Kraków, Grand Duchy of Kraków, Kingdom of Galicia and Lodomeria, Cisleithania, Austria-Hungary
- Died: October 16, 1946 (aged 45); Świdnica, Poland
- Education: Jan Matejko Academy of Fine Arts

Adam Franciszek Jaźwiecki was a Polish political prisoner and artist interned in Auschwitz, known as the Portraitist of Auschwitz for his portraits of other inmates.

== Biography ==
As an artist, in 1930s he was active in the Kraków Group.

On December 1, 1942, Jaźwiecki was deported from Kraków to Auschwitz.

Jaźwiecki worked in Auschwitz's carpentry workshop and paint workshop. Prisoners were not allowed to make art, under penalty of torture or death, and so Jaźwiecki had to hide his portraits, which he did in his clothes or bed. However, they were eventually discovered by the SS, and SS-Scharführer Wilhelm Boger was assigned to investigate his case.

“He sits down behind the table and browses through my drawings. ... Through hurting eyes I can see him looking at them with interest. ... Thus I feel I'm not going to be hanged, I also feel that he is going to punish me in his own way and not through the Politische Abteilung, because he wants to steal these drawings for himself. ... Otherwise, he would have to send them away with me, and he's putting them into the drawer.” - Jaźwiecki on SS-Scharführer Wilhelm Boger

Jaźwiecki was sentenced to three months in a penal company and forbidden from sending or receiving letters.

“With a load of 40 kg of sand on bent back... Round and round again... For 12 hours... And so round and round again, for three months with a hundred other miserable souls... Round and round... Day by day. ... One more step, at least one and one again, before I drop, and the Kapo finishes me off.” - Jaźwiecki on the penal company

In March 1943, Jaźwiecki, via Gross-Rosen, was transferred to Sachsenhausen. On July 28, 1944, he was transferred to Schönebeck subcamp of Buchenwald.

A year after being liberated from the camp, Jaźwiecki died of tuberculosis. His family donated 100 of his portraits to the Auschwitz-Birkenau Museum. Agnieszka Sieradzka, an art historian at the museum, suggests that Jaźwiecki intended the portraits to be a part of historical record, as he included the prisoner numbers in most of his portraits, allowing the subjects' names to be revealed through cross-reference with the extensive camp records.
