= Iwona Demko =

Polish artist (born 1974)

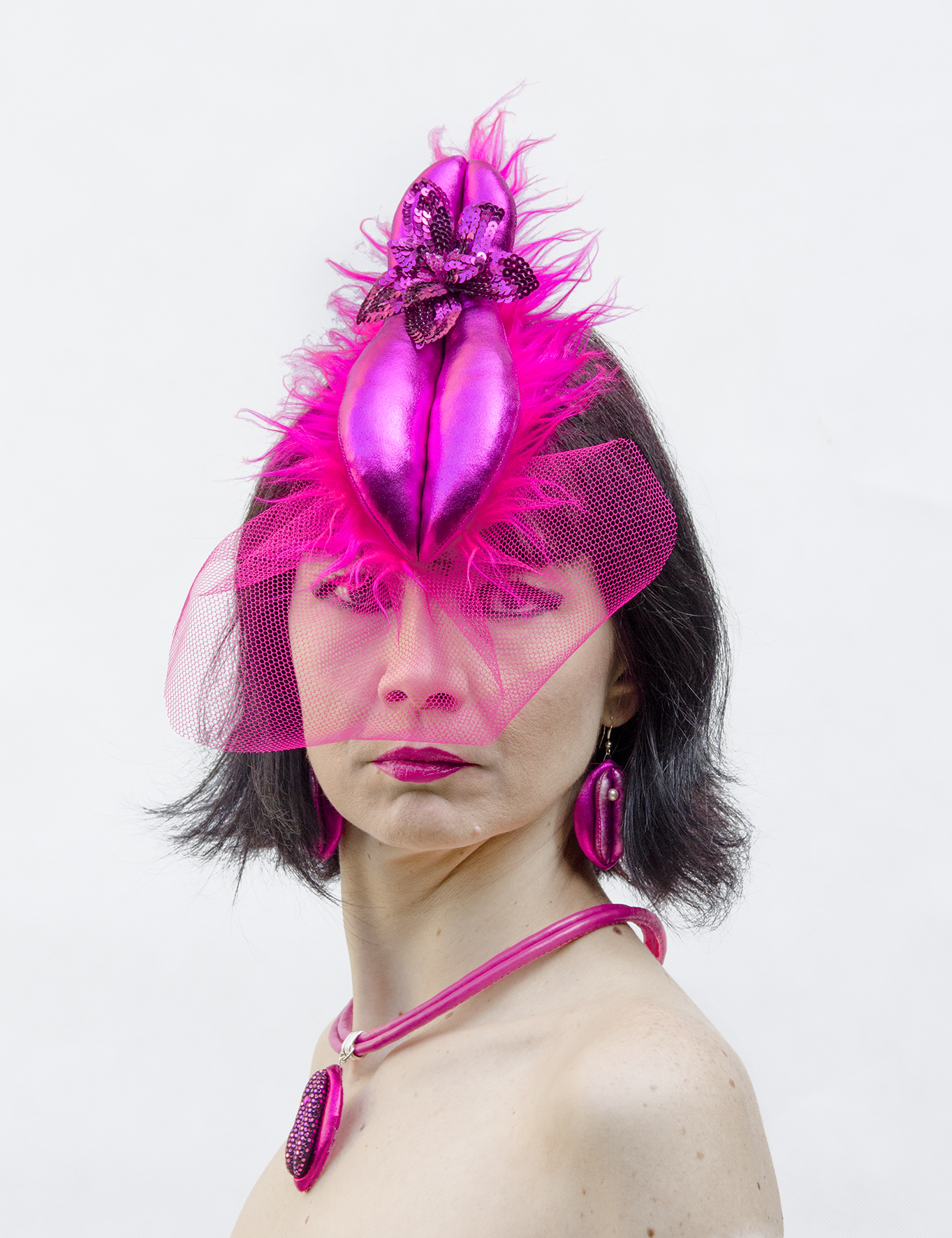
- Iwona Demko, 2014
- Born: 7 August 1974 (age 51)
- Citizenship: Polish
- Occupation: artist

Iwona Demko (born 7 August 1974) is a contemporary artist, feminist and Wikipedian.

== Biography ==
In 2011 she graduated in sculpture from the Jan Matejko Academy of Fine Arts in Kraków. In 2012 she obtained doctorate and in 2016 she obtained habilitation.

She participated in Vagina 2.0 virtual exhibition, the project of Vaginamuseum

In 2018, she published a monograph on the life of Zofia Baltarowicz-Dzielińska, titled Zofia Baltarowicz-Dzielińska: pierwsza studentka Akademii Sztuk Pięknych w Krakowie, and published by the Academy of Fine Arts in Kraków.

She is a Wikipedian.

== Accolades ==
In 2021 she received Maria Anto and Elsa von Freytag-Loringhoven Art Award.
