= Maria Jarema =

Polish painter, sculptor, scenographer and actress

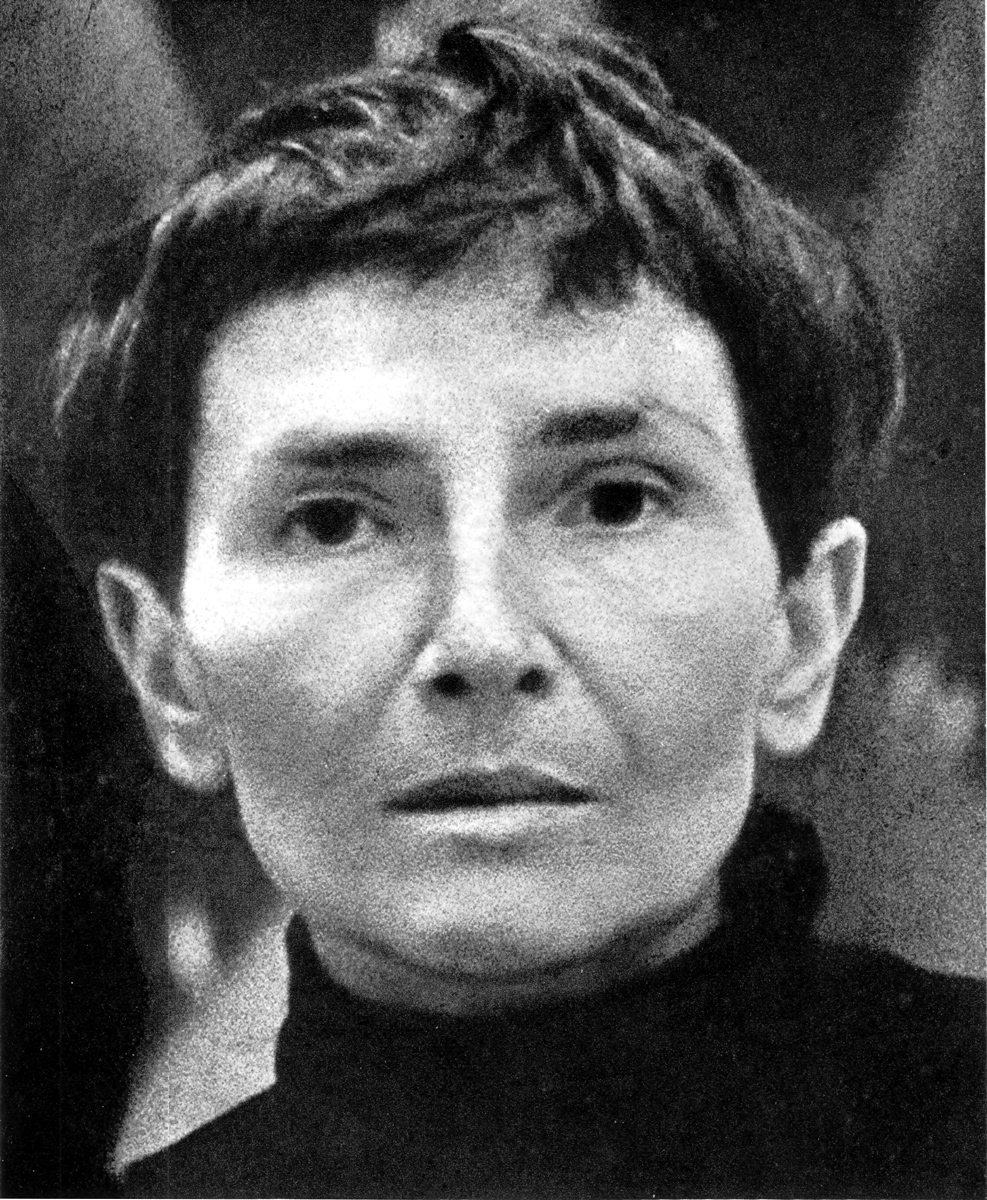
- Born: Maria Jaremianka; 24 November 1908; Staryi Sambir, Kingdom of Galicia and Lodomeria (currently Ukraine)
- Died: 1 November 1958 (aged 49); Kraków, Polish People's Republic
- Education: Jan Matejko Academy of Fine Arts
- Known for: painting, sculpture
- Notable work: Penetracje (Penetrations); Rytmy (Rhythms); Formy (Forms); Głowy (Heads)
- Spouse: Kornel Filipowicz

Maria Jarema (24 November 1908 – 1 November 1958) was a Polish painter, sculptor, scenographer and actress. She was a founder of the interwar leftist avant-garde Kraków Group (Grupa Krakowska). In addition to her own artistic practice, Jarema was a long-time collaborator of the Polish painter and playwright Tadeusz Kantor.

== Life and career ==
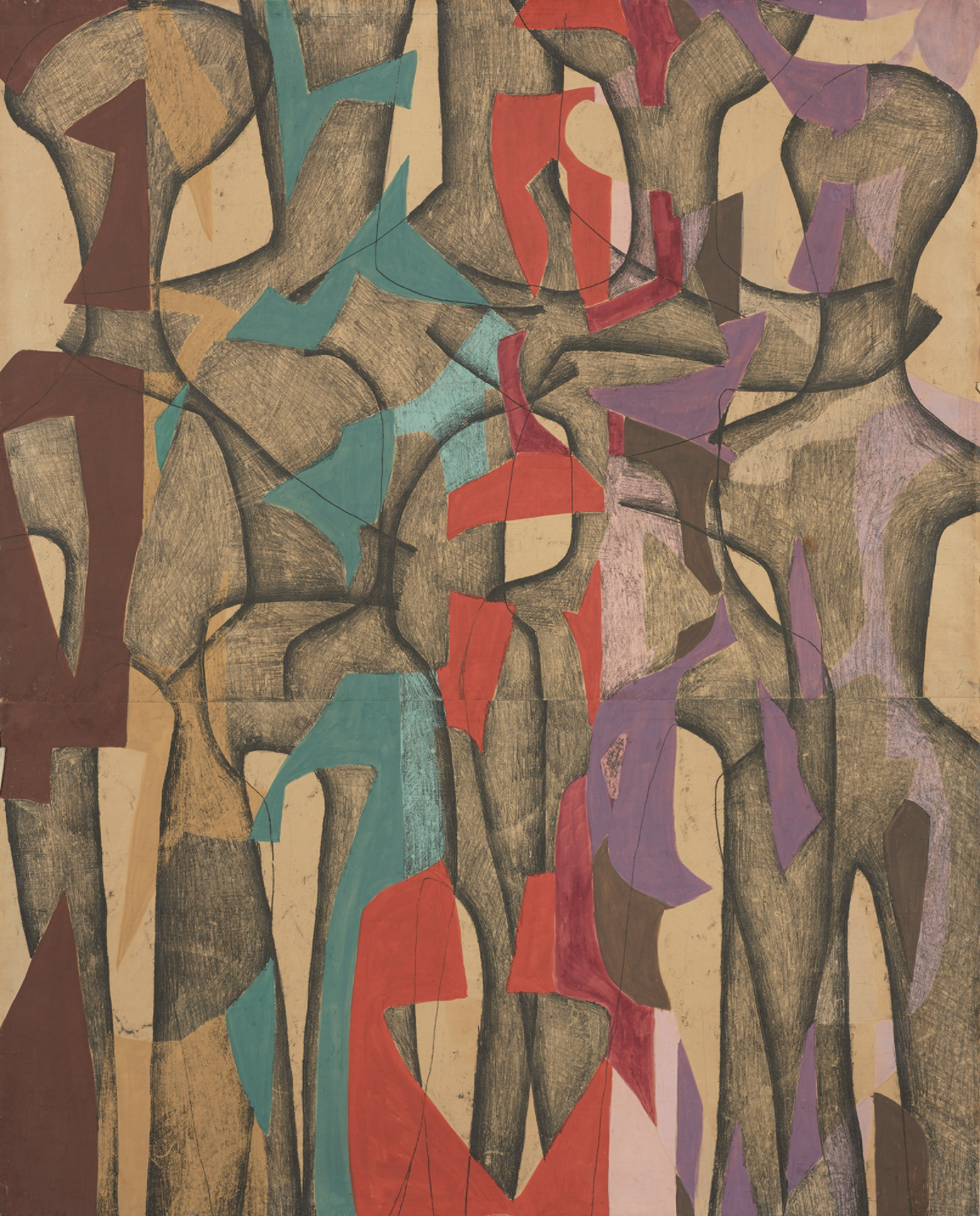
Maria Jarema, Abstract composition, 1956

=== Early career (1920s-1930s) ===
She was born on 24 November 1908 in Staryi Sambir (Polish: Stary Sambor) in the Kingdom of Galicia and Lodomeria (currently Ukraine). In the years 1929–1935, she studied sculpture at the Jan Matejko Academy of Fine Arts in Kraków, under supervision of Xawery Dunikowski. In 1932, she co-founded the avant-garde, radical left Kraków Group. Jarema was an outspoken leftist during the interwar period and supported labor movements in Poland and abroad. She also designed a memorial in Kraków for socialists and communist activists killed during the 1934 Paris strikes. She was one of the founders of the avant-garde theatre Cricot (1933–1938) alongside Józef Jarema, Henryk Gotlib and Zbigniew Pronaszko.

=== Postwar period (1945-1958) ===
Before the outbreak of World War II, Jarema worked primarily as a sculptor but after 1945 she focused on painting. Following the period of Socialist Realism in Poland and as a result of the subsequent Thaw, she turned to abstraction. Since 1951, she created monotypes. Using this printmaking technique and sometimes combining it with oil paints and distemper, she created her most famous cycles of paintings: Penetracje (Penetrations) and Rytmy (Rhythms). Her works reflected an engagement with the human form and its place in space as well as the depiction of movement in painting. Balancing between anthropomorphic and abstract forms is also a distinctive feature of her postwar work. Beyond painting, Jarema continued her artistic collaboration with Tadeusz Kantor and his experimental theatre Cricot 2.

In 1955, Jarema was diagnosed with leukemia and later received treatment in Paris. In 1958, her works were shown at the Polish pavilion at the 29th Venice Biennale. Her health deteriorated that summer and she underwent an experimental bone marrow transplant in October. Jarema died in Kraków on November 1, 1958, from complications from leukemia.

=== Legacy ===
After her death, Jarema's works have been exhibited in Poland and abroad, including at the São Paulo Art Biennial in 1961. A large retrospective exhibition was organized in 1998–1999 at the Zachęta National Gallery of Art in Warsaw and the National Museum in Wrocław. In 2018, her painting Formy (Forms) from 1957 was sold at an auction for over 1 million zloty (ca. US$270,000), setting a record for the most expensive painting by a female artist sold in Poland at the time. In 2019, Agnieszka Dauksza published a Nike Award-nominated book Jaremianka. Biografia focusing on the life of Jarema and her artistic legacy.

== Personal life ==
She was a sister of painter Józef Jarema and actor Władysław Jarema, the founder of the Groteska Theatre in Kraków. She married novelist and short story writer Kornel Filipowicz.

== See also ==
- List of Polish painters
- List of Polish sculptors
