= Theatrical troupe =

Informal group of actors

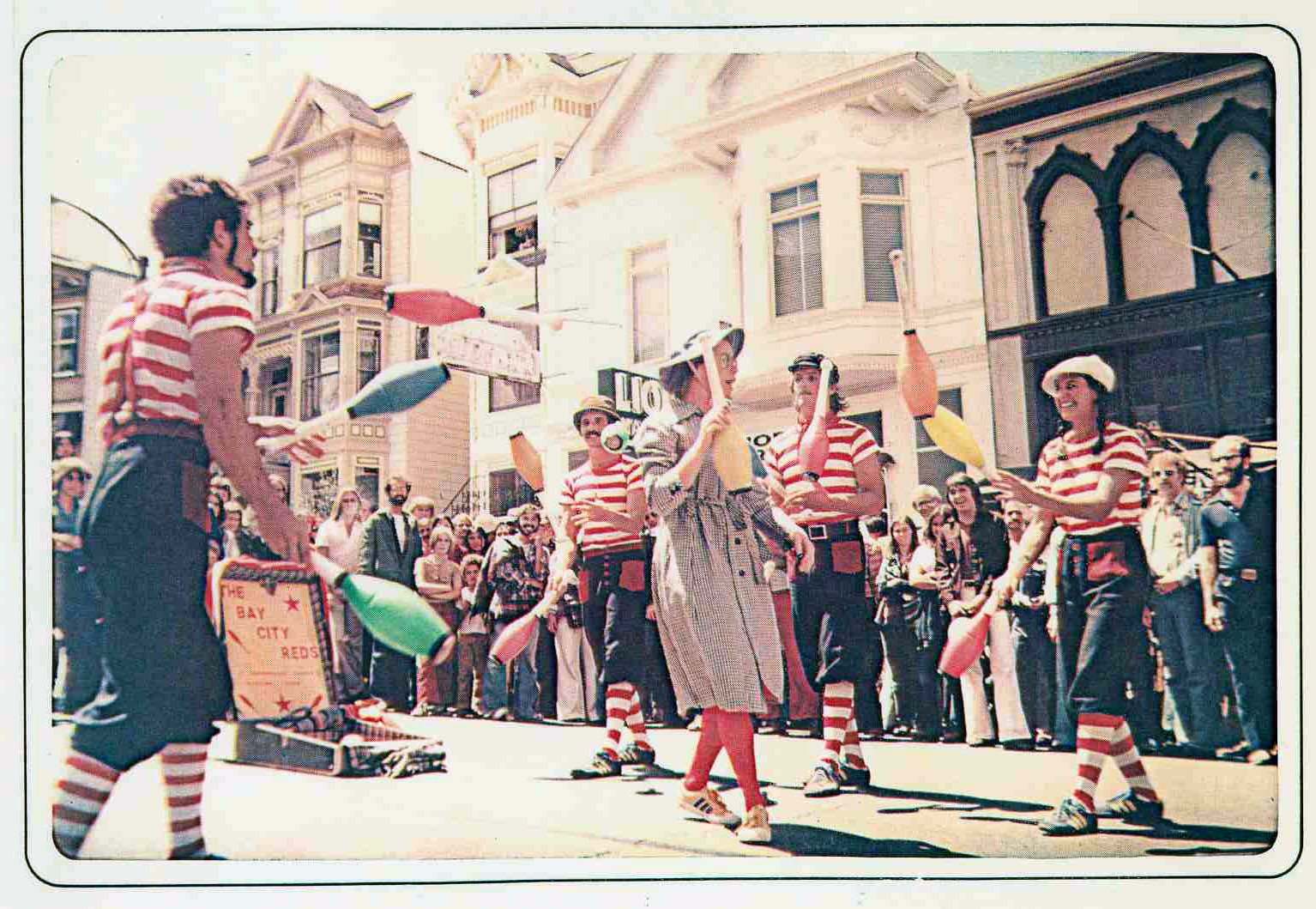
The Bay City Reds juggling troupe at the Castro Street Fair, San Francisco, 1975.

Theatrical troupe (French: troupe), sometimes referred to as an acting company, is a group of theatrical performers working together. They may work in repertory other types of theatres, and may take performances on tour. They are not the same as a theatre company, which is an organisation that produces theatrical performances, although there is sometimes an overlap in terminology.

The troupe is termed a resident acting company (or resident company) if they are supported by a particular theatre, where they have a home base, such as the Everyman Theatre in Baltimore, Connecticut, United States The State Theatre Company of South Australia, whose home base is at the Adelaide Festival Centre, is referred to as the resident artistic company.

Troupes are frequently organised by theatre practitioners (e.g. Bertolt Brecht's Berliner Ensemble or Tadeusz Kantor's Cricot 2). The membership can be divided into permanent or temporary as, for example, in the Comédie-Française (French: sociétaires and pensionnaires).

== See also ==
- Playing companies, historical term for a company of actors in Renaissance England
