= Blonder =

Blonder may refer to:

- Blond
- Blonde and Blonder, 2008 film
- Blonder and Blonder, 1995 album
- Blonder Tongue Audio Baton, 1993 album by Swirlies
- Blonder Tongue Labs, American electronics company
- Blonder (surname)
