= Kraków Group =

Polish art collective

Kraków Group was an art collective from Kraków active from 1932 to 1937, consisting of artists such as Sasza Blonder, Berta Grünberg, Maria Jarema, Franciszek Jaźwiecki, Leopold Lewicki, Adam Marczyński, Stanisław Osostowicz, Szymon Piasecki, Bolesław Stawiński, Jonasz Stern, Aleksander Winnicki and Henryk Wiciński. The group was connected with the Cricot theatre.

Exhibitions of the Kraków Group were held at the National Museum in Wrocław from December 2018 to March 2019 and at Kamienica Słoszayskich, division of the National Museum in Kraków from September 2019 to March 2020.

== Second Kraków Group ==
Second Kraków Group was established in 1957. Second Kraków Group's works were shown in MOCAK from March to September 2023, and at the Willa Caro in Gliwice from April to September 2023.

== Bibliography ==
- Kosińska, Maria (1974). "Grupa Krakowska". In Aleksander Wojciechowski (ed.). Polskie życie artystyczne w latach 1915–1939. Wrocław – Warszawa – Kraków – Gdańsk: Zakład Narodowy im. Ossolińskich, Instytut Sztuki Polskiej Akademii Nauk. pp. 610–612.
- Józef Chrobak, ed. (2008). Grupa Krakowska: dokumenty i materiały z lat 1932–2008. Kraków: Ośrodek Dokumentacji Sztuki Tadeusza Kantora "Cricoteka". ISBN 9788361213482.
- Barbara Ilkosz, ed. (2018). Grupa Krakowska 1932–1937. ISBN 9788365563705.
