= Sylwester Ambroziak =

Polish sculptor

Sylwester Ambroziak (born 14 April 1964) is a Polish sculptor.

== Education and Career ==
He studied at the Academy of Fine Arts in Warsaw in the Sculpture Department in the years 1983–1989 under professors Jerzy Jarnuszkiewicz, Stanisław Kulon and Grzegorz Kowalski. He has exhibited his work all around Europe and North America since 1986 including Warsaw, Stockholm, Montreal, Vienna, Düsseldorf, Ostrava, Poznań, London and Amsterdam.

== See also ==
- List of Polish sculptors
