= Ludmila Armata =

Polish-born Canadian painter

- Ludmiła Armata
- Born: 1954 (age 70–71); Zabrze, Poland
- Education: Academy of Fine Arts in Kraków
- Occupation(s): Painter, printmaker, educator

Ludmila Armata (Polish: Ludmiła Armata; born 1954) is a Polish-born Canadian painter, printmaker, and educator. She lives and works in Quebec.

== Biography ==
Ludmila Armata was born in Zabrze, Poland. She studied at the Academy of Fine Arts in Kraków (now Jan Matejko Academy of Fine Arts) between 1973–1978 and received a degree in graphics and lithography. She emigrated to Canada in 1981. Armata is a member of the Conseil de la Peinture du Quebec, and the Conseil de l'Estampe du Quebec.

Her work is included in the collections of the Musée national des beaux-arts du Québec, and the National Gallery of Art, Washington.
