= Miłosz Horodyski =

Polish film director and journalist

Miłosz Horodyski (born 1974 in Kraków) is an artist, painter, a Polish film director and television director, film producer, an academic teacher and journalist. He lives and works in Kraków as a journalist in a Polish Television TVP Kraków. He is also an academic teacher at Jan Matejko Academy of Fine Arts in Kraków.

== Documentaries ==
- 2007 Czerwony maj
- 2007 Pałka i Konstytucja
- 2007 Hutnik- historia pisana powielaczem
- 2008 Tożsamość wolności
- 2008 Nowa Huta walczy!
- 2008 Niewidzialni drukarze
- 2009 Dymy nad Arką Pana ("The Smokes over the Ark of the Lord")
- 2009 Plotka pod dozorem specjalnym ("The Special supervision gosip")
