= Kornel Filipowicz =

Polish poet, novelist, and screenwriter (1913–1990)

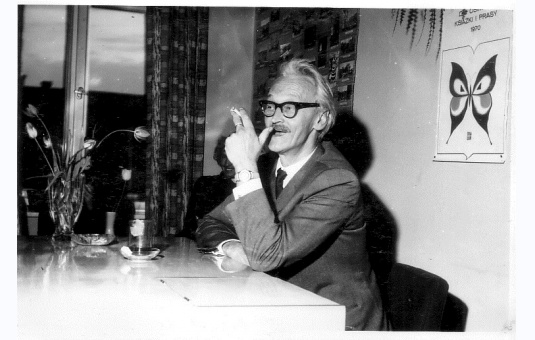
- Kornel Filipowicz in Andrychów, 1970
- Born: 27 October 1913; Tarnopol, Austria-Hungary
- Died: 28 February 1990 (aged 76); Kraków, Poland
- Citizenship: Polish
- Occupations: Novelist, screenwriter, poet
- Spouse: Maria Jarema
- Writing career
- Period: 1947–1984

Kornel Filipowicz (27 October 1913 – 28 February 1990) was a Polish novelist, poet, screenwriter and short stories writer.

== Biography ==
The son of Karol Filipowicz and Stanisława née Futyma. He graduated from a mathematics and natural sciences gymnasium in Cieszyn. In 1933 he enrolled at the Jagiellonian University to study biology. He joined the Związek Niezależnej Młodzieży Socjalistycznej.

In 1945 he married Maria Jarema. From 1975, he was a board member of the Kraków Branch of the Polish Writers' Union (ZLP), and from 1980, its vice-president. In 1964 he married Maria Próchnicka. From 1967 he was in a relationship with Wisława Szymborska. He was buried at the Salwator Cemetery.

== Works (selection) ==
=== Poetry ===
- Mijani (The Ones Passed By, 1943)
- Powiedz to słowo (Say This Word, 1997)

=== Prose ===
- Krajobraz niewzruszony (Landscape Unmoved, 1947)
- Księżyc nad Nidą (The Moon Over Nida, 1950)
- Ulica Gołębia (Gołębia Street, 1955)
- Ciemność i światło (Darkness and Light, 1959)
- Biały ptak (A White Bird, 1960)
- Romans prowincjonalny (A Provincial Romance, 1960)
- Pamiętnik antybohatera (The Memoir of an Anti-Hero, 1961; English translation by Anna Zaranko, 2019, winner of the Found in Translation Award 2020)
- Mój przyjaciel i ryby (My Friend and Fishes, 1963)
- Jeniec i dziewczyna (A Captive and A Girl, 1964)
- Ogród pana Nietschke (The Garden of Mr. Nietschke, 1965)
- Mężczyzna jak dziecko (A Man As a Child, 1967)
- Co jest w człowieku (What's In the Man, 1971)
- Śmierć mojego antagonisty (The Death of My Antagonist, 1972)
- Gdy przychodzi silniejszy (When the Stronger, 1974)
- Kot w mokrej trawie (A Cat In a Wet Grass, 1977)
- Dzień wielkiej ryby (The Day of a Great Fish, 1978)
- Zabić jelenia (To Kill a Deer, 1978)
- Krajobraz, który przeżył śmierć (The Landscape That Survived the Death, 1986)
- Rozmowy na schodach (Conversations At the Stairs, 1989)
- Wszystko, co mieć można (All That One Can Have, 1991)

=== Screenplays ===
- Three Women (1956)
  Based on his 1956 short story "Trzy kobiety z obozu" about returning home of three women which were captives in a Nazi concentration camp
- Miejsce na ziemi (A Place on Earth, 1959)
- Głos z tamtego świata (The Voice From the Other World, 1962)
- Piekło i niebo (Heaven and Hell, 1966)
- Szklana kula (Crystal Ball, 1972)
- Egzekucja w ZOO (1975)

== Awards ==
- Gold Cross of Merit (1955)
- Officer's Cross of the Order of Polonia Restituta (1963)

== Bibliography ==
- Gorzkowicz, Justyna (2018). W poszukiwaniu antagonisty. O wątkach egzystencjalnych w twórczości Kornela Filipowicza. Wydawnictwo Pewne. "Introduction" (PDF). Archived from the original (PDF) on 6 February 2020.
