= Blonder (surname) =

Blonder is a surname. Notable people with the surname include:

- Daryl Blonder (1981–2012), American actor
- Leopold Blonder (1893–1932), Austrian artist
- Sasza Blonder (1909–1949), Polish painter
