= Stanisław Tondos =

Polish painter (1854–1917)

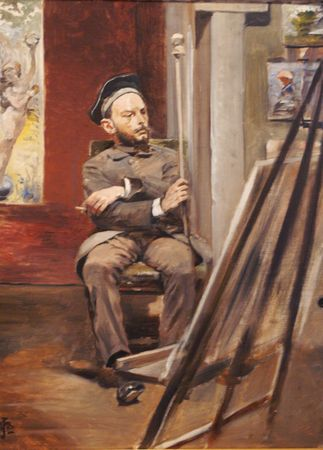
- Stanisław Tondos; Portrait by Jacek Malczewski
- Born: March 10, 1854; Kraków
- Died: December 22, 1917 (aged 63); Kraków

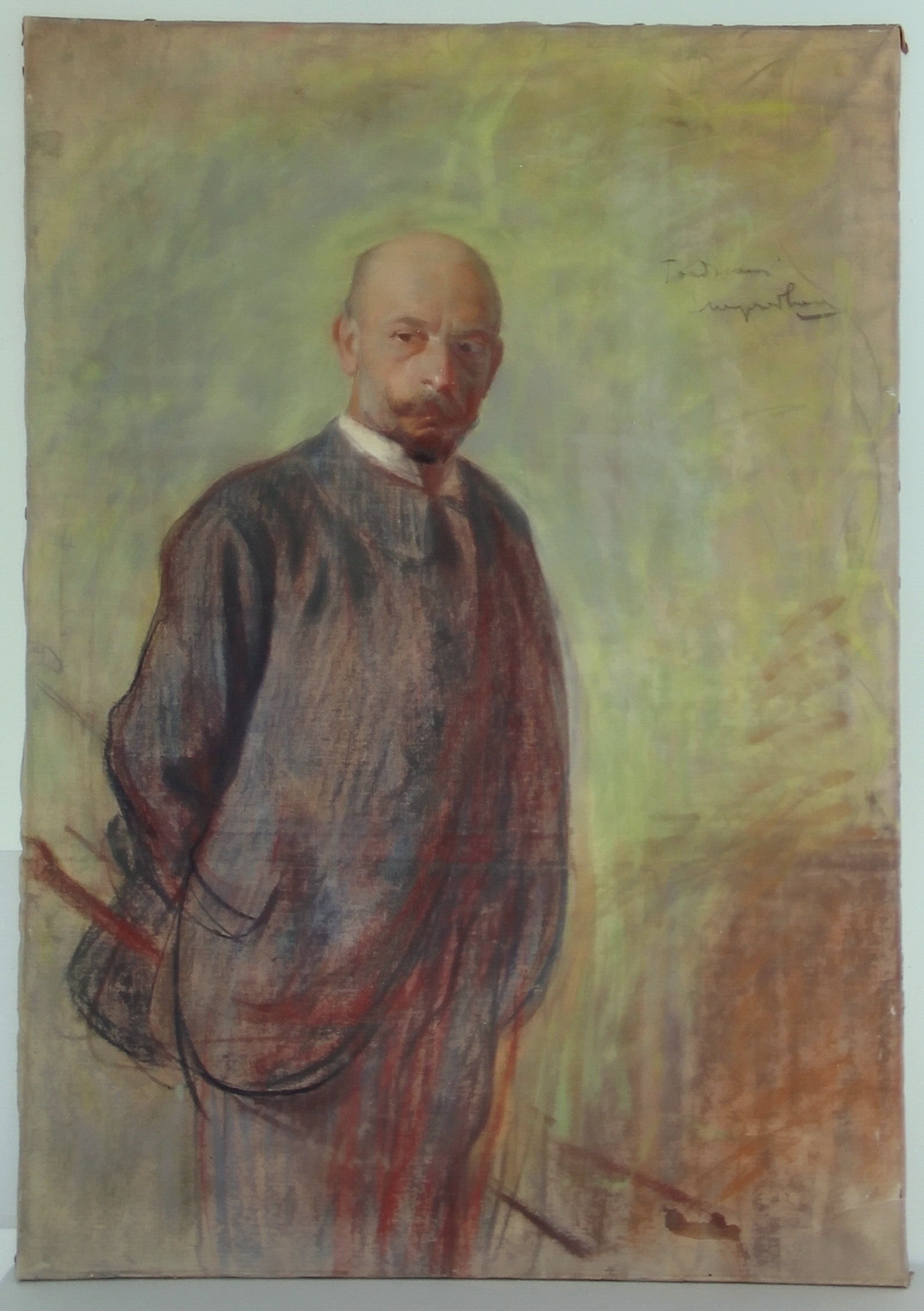
Stanisław Tondos Portrait by Leon Wyczółkowski

Stanisław Tondos (10 March 1854 – 22 December 1917) was a Polish landscape painter and architectural painter.

== Life ==
Tondos was born on March 10, 1854 in Kraków.

He studied during the years 1869–1875 at the Jan Matejko Academy of Fine Arts with Jan Matejko and Władysław Łuszczkiewicz, among others, and continued his education in Vienna and Munich. He mainly painted watercolors depicting cityscapes (Veduta). He also used oil and pastel techniques. He most often depicted Kraków. He also painted Warsaw, Poznań and Lviv. He went to work in Venice, Vienna, Nuremberg and Magdeburg. His works today have documentary value, because they illustrate the appearance of no-longer existing buildings and entire architectural ensembles. They also served the restorers in the restoration of historical monuments and buildings in Kraków. His works can currently be seen on the Wawel among others.

Tondos was a supporter of propagating art using postcards. In 1886, in cooperation with Juliusz Kossak, he published a graphic portfolio titled Klejnoty m. Krakowa (Jewels of the city of Kraków), containing reproductions of 24 watercolors. Later, with Wojciech Kossak, he published subsequent cycles of watercolors. He received gold medals at postcard exhibitions in Warsaw and Paris in 1900.

Tondos died on December 22, 1917 in Kraków.

== Gallery ==
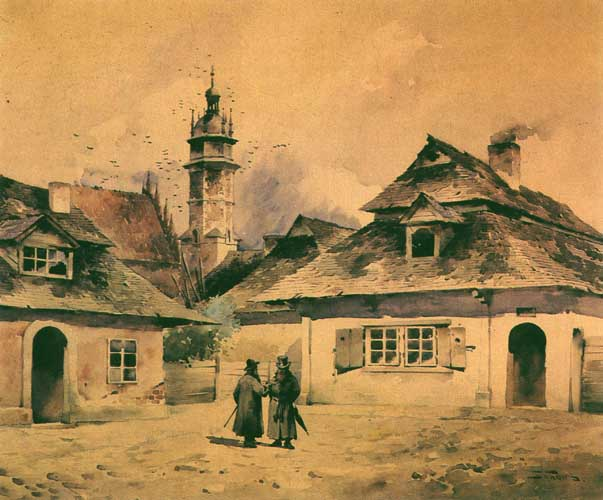
Kazimierz

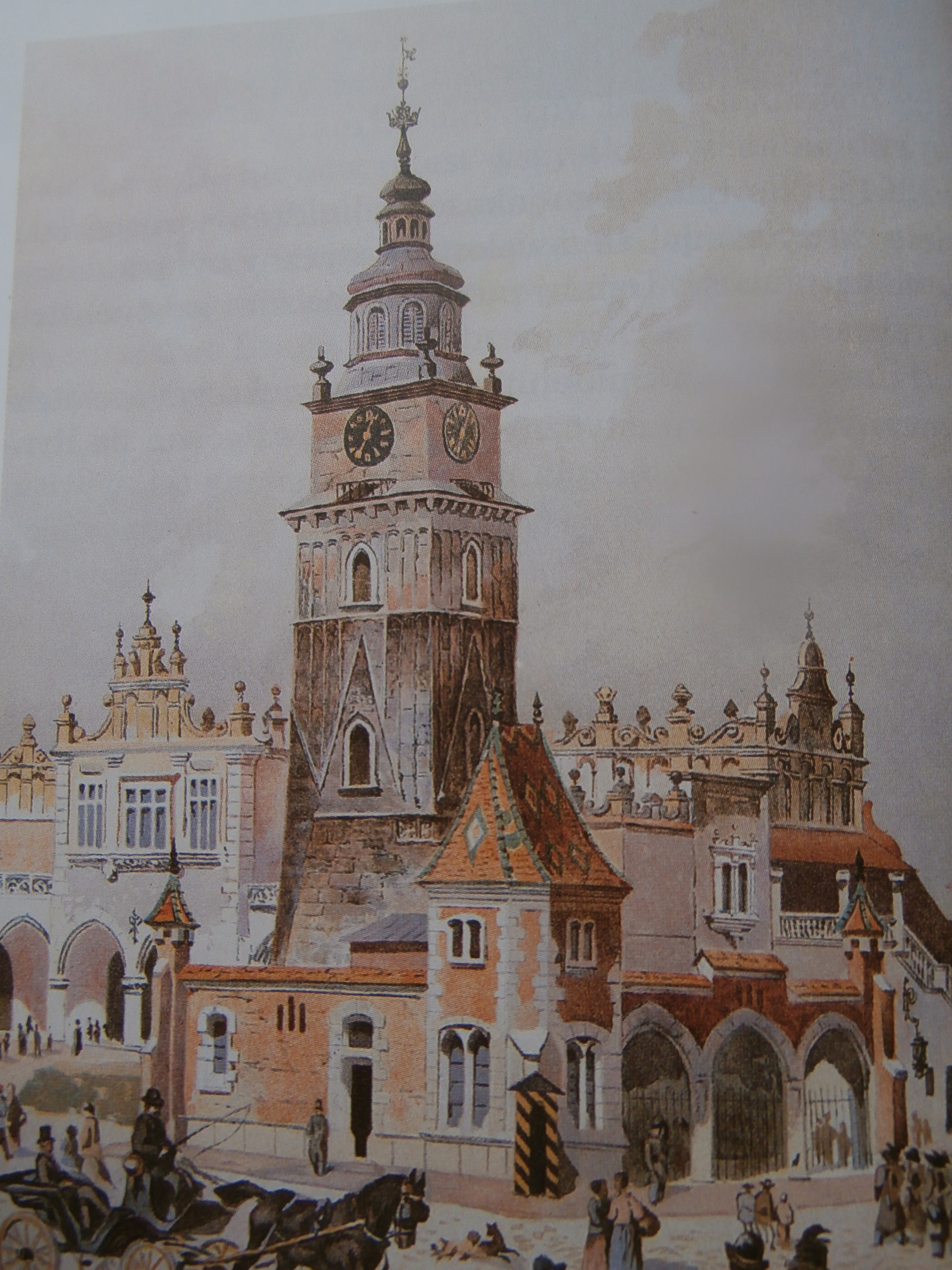
Town Hall Tower, Kraków

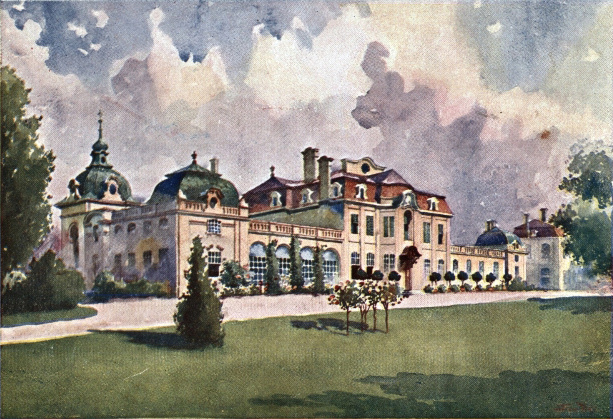
Watercolor depicting the Goetz Palace in Brzesko
