= Vaginamuseum =

International internet project

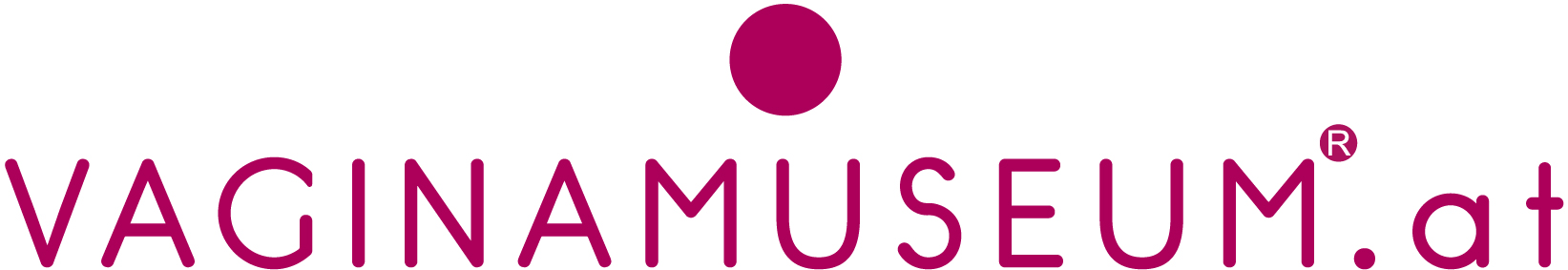
Vaginamuseum logo

The virtual Vaginamuseum is an international internet project, founded by the Austrian artist, Kerstin Rajnar, in 2014. It consists in a virtual gallery and a virtual archive containing background information about the female sex and femininity. Various representations of female sexual organs indicate the existence of a female role model in social systems and allow conclusions to be drawn as to the importance of women in different environments. This project aims at promoting the artistic creation and debate about the female sex. It supports the positive meanings and appreciation of the words and body parts such as the vagina, vulva, and clitoris. The museum is considered the first to be devoted to the vagina.

== About ==
The Vaginamuseum communicates informations and is an educational platform. Experts of art history, health care, medical science, as well as artists of all disciplines, are creating this platform. The archive displays conceptual and historical texts and other articles and contributions about the vagina, the vulva and the clitoris. The curated gallery shows selected artworks which stimulate new thinking about the female genital and lead to new perspectives. Rajnar's vision is that the museum can help improve people's negative attitudes about the vagina which are shaped through culture and media.

The Vaginamuseum elaborated concepts on the topic: Art and Culture and Life and Limb _ the positive Power of Feminity.

Vaginamuseum is registered at the European Union Intellectual Property Office (EUIPO).

== Exhibitions in the gallery ==
=== Vagina 2.0 ===
The virtual opening exhibition curated by the media artist and curator Doris Jauk-Hinz broaches the issue of current terms and subjective meanings of the female sexual organs. Reflections in dealing with the term vagina are based on ideas, expectations, attributions, associations and emotions by means of art. The artistic inputs range from earlier depictions of vulva symbols in different civilizations and times to the life and work on social media platforms and sex-positive feminism in cyberspace.

Artists (alphabetical order): Collective AMAE (GB), Teresa Ascencao (CA), Mattia Biagi (US), Iwona Demko (PL), Collective Freudenweide & Villefort (AT), Faith Holland (US), Barbara Klampfl / Gisela Reimer (AT), Petra Mattheis (DE), Sofia Ntontis (AT), Angela Proyer (AT), Melinda Rackham (AU), Rosa Roedelius (AT), Grit Scholz (DE), Ulla Sladek (AT), Christina Strasser (AT), Myriam Thyes (DE), Dorothée Zombronner (DE)

=== Geburt_to animate ===
The second exhibition is an exploration of the “inner“ functional female body as a point of reception and a place where new life is born – a cultural place of origin. The artistic contributions address natural and artificial processes that create life within a cultural dynamic. They depict desires for the composition of “creation“ and range from the metaphoric realization in artistic processes to the “self-design“ of life. Articles on the topic of birth complete the exhibition.

Artists (alphabetical order): Zara Alexandrova (DE), Teresa Ascencao (CA), Rachelle Beaudoin (US), Yvonne Beelen (NL), Ada Kobusiewicz (AT/POL), Renate Kordon (AT), Bernhard Krähenmann (CH), Gertrude Moser-Wagner (AT), Boryana Rossa (US), Barbara Schmid / Ulla Sladek (AT), Maja Smekar (SI)

== Contributions in the archive ==
=== Art history ===
This contribution was developed by the art historian Sara Buchbauer. It gives an overview of the depiction of the female sex starting from the European Paleolithic up to present day art. The texts about different periods serve as an introduction to offer information on the political and cultural events of the time, on the women's role and stylistic characteristics relating to art. Around 100 art works of particular periods were chosen to exemplify particular times. They illustrate the style of the period and serve as documents for particular stages of development.

=== Vaginalogy ===
This contribution was developed by the physician Jana Studnicka. It offers insights into the topics of woman, body, sexuality and society. Not only medical, but also social and psychological aspects of femininity are discussed. The content changes between gender identity, sexual orientation, external and internal female sexual organs, contraception, reproduction, menstruation, sexual medicine, violence against women, etc. This contribution reflects the current state of research as well as different perspectives on various issues and problem areas. It clarifies present thought patterns and presents the latest scientific insights.

The newly created term Vaginalogy doesn't yet exist in the general language and consists of the word Vagina and the suffix -logy. The idea was to set a counterpoint to the medical term gynecology. Because gynecology is primarily concerned with the teaching of the diseases of the female body.

== Press ==
In 2014, the Jetzt-Magazin of the Süddeutsche Zeitung published an interview with Kerstin Rajnar and with Hjortur Gisli Sigurdsson, director of the Icelandic Phallological Museum in Reykjavík. In the interview Rajnar reported that the Vaginamuseum had been heavily criticized even before the opening, also because of state funding.

Stephanie Johne wrote on the website Refinery29: "Gender paradigms must be questioned critically and overcome once and for all. The virtual Vaginamuseum makes a crucial contribution to a more positive perception of the female sex, to such a degree as art contributes to its acceptance on a broader level. This is why its online presence determines its offline presence at the end of the day!"

== Financing ==
The bilingual Vaginamuseum, translated by Christine Wilhelm is supported by the art department of the Austrian government, the Cultural Department of Styria, the Department for Women, anti-discrimination and equal treatment of Burgenland and by the cities of Vienna and Graz.

== See also ==
- Vagina and vulva in art
- Culture and menstruation
