= Adam Studziński =

Polish Roman Catholic priest

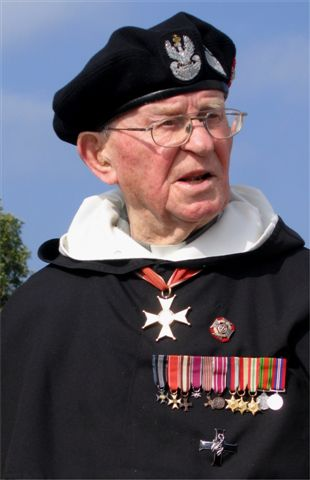
- Adam Studziński in Monte Cassino, 2007

Personal life
- Born: 2 June 1911
- Died: 2 April 2008 (aged 96) Kraków
- Posthumous name: Adam Studziński

Religious life
- Religion: Roman Catholicism
- Order: Dominican Order
- Ordination: 1937

Fr. Adam Studziński (2 June 1911 – 2 April 2008) was a Polish Roman Catholic priest (of the Dominican Order). Studzinski served as chaplain of the Polish Armed Forces in the West during World War II.

== Biography ==
Studziński was first ordained as a Dominican priest in 1937. He served with the Polish forces in Palestine. He later took part in the Italian Campaign with Polish forces during the World War II, including the Battle of Monte Cassino. For his service as a Polish chaplain during the war, Fr. Studziński was honored with several Polish military and state honors, including the Cross of Valour (Poland), Silver Cross of the Virtuti Militari, Cross of Merit with Swords and the Commander's Cross with Star of Polonia Restituta (Order of Reborn Poland). He was also awarded with several British honors as well.

Adam Studziński studied art conservation at the Jan Matejko Academy of Fine Arts in Kraków. He worked to renovate the Dominican monastery and St. Guy's Catholic Church, both of which are located in Kraków.

Studziński was made an honorary citizen of Kraków in 1999. He was promoted to the rank of general in 2006. He authored several publications, including a guide to Polish war cemeteries in Italy and a book about his memories of World War II. He remained active in Polish veteran organizations, including for Polish Scouting, where he had ranked Harcmistrz.

Fr. Adam Studziński died in Kraków on April 2, 2008, at the age of 96.
