= Cricot 2 =

Polish experimental theatre company

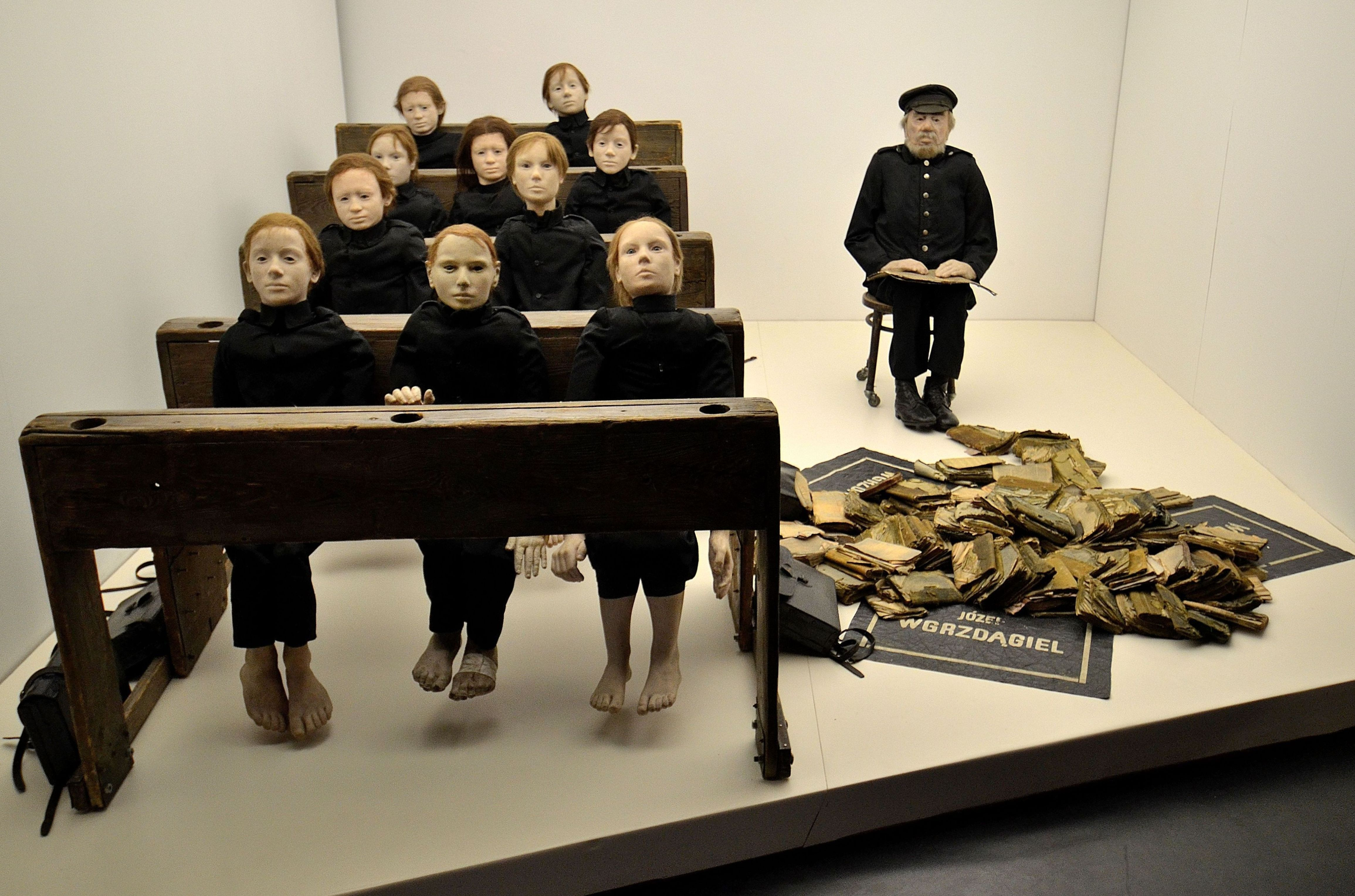
- Dead Class of 1975 by Cricot 2
- Formation: 1955
- Dissolved: 1991
- Type: Theatre group
- Purpose: Experimental theatre
- Location: Kraków
- Artistic director: Tadeusz Kantor

Cricot 2 was a Polish experimental theatre company based in Kraków. It was founded in 1955 by the renowned theatre director, professional painter and assemblage artist, avantgarde set designer and art theorist Tadeusz Kantor, with artwork in the collections of the National Museum in Kraków and Warsaw.

Productions were initially based on dramas by Witkacy, but later plays were genuine creations of Tadeusz Kantor himself.

== Background ==
Cricot 2 played in Poland and abroad. The greatest popularity and recognition Cricot 2 received for its original production of the Dead Class (Umarła klasa) of 1975; a new theatrical format invented by Kantor. It was dubbed the "Theatre of Death", a kind of spiritualist séance, evoking sensory images, words and sounds deformed by the passing of time. Based on his personal memories and experiences of the Holocaust, Kantor tried to capture the collective memory of the Polish-Jewish tragedy of mid twentieth century.

Kantor created his own unique visual canon and theatrical ambience impossible to repeat or continue after his death in 1990. Soon thereafter, his last production called Dziś są moje urodziny (Today is my Birthday) has been completed and performed by the actors without his presence and the company ceased operations, even though the discussions whether or not to continue without him were split.

== See also ==
- Maria Jarema
- Theatre of Poland
