= Zbylut Grzywacz =

Polish artist (1939–2004)

- Painting by Zbylut Grzywacz, "Kolejka jeszcze trwa" (And the Queue Still Goes On), 1973, acrylic on canvas, 135x170 cm, National Museum, Kraków
- Born: June 4, 1939
- Died: July 16, 2004 (aged 65)
- Education: Academy of Fine Arts in Kraków (MA)
- Occupations: Painter, graphic artist, professor

Zbylut Franciszek Grzywacz (June 4, 1939 – July 16, 2004) was a Polish painter, sculptor, graphic artist, and professor of the Academy of Fine Arts in Kraków with paintings in permanent collections of the National Museum in Kraków, Warsaw, Poznań, Gdańsk and Wrocław. Grzywacz took part in over a hundred Polish and international art exhibits, with around 40 one-man shows to his credit.

== Career ==
Grzywacz studied painting at the Academy of Fine Arts in Kraków and received his master's degree in 1963 in Emil Krcha atelier. He worked at the Academy as a teaching assistant in the Department of Painting since 1972 and in 1991 became a professor there. Interned during the martial law of 1981 Grzywacz was an active supporter of the dissident movement in communist Poland before the Revolutions of 1989.

== Major series of paintings ==
Zbylut Grzywacz, "Model", oil on canvas

- 1965-69 - Orantki, świadkowie, mówcy, padający (Oracles, Witnesses, Speakers, and the Falling)
- 1966-67 - Utrwalone (Preserved), reliefs
- 1971-75 - Człowiek bez jakości (Man without quality), paintings and assemblage
- 1970-75 - Lalki (Dolls)
- 1971-79 - Opuszczona (Abandoned)
- 1974-79 - Domy (Homes)
- 1976-81 - Cykl wołowy (Beef series)
- 1982-88 - Dwoje (The Two)
- 1982-86 - Kolejka (The Lineup)
- 1987-93 - Oddalona (Distant She)
- 1994 - 9 obrazów (9 Paintings)

== See also ==
- Culture of Kraków
