= Antoni Frąckiewicz =

Polish sculptor

Antoni Frąckiewicz was a Polish sculptor of the Baroque era, working in Małopolska in the early nineteenth century. His date of birth and death are unknown.

Frąckiewicz was referred to in the work of architect Baltazar Fontana. He executed sculptural decoration of the Norbertine Sisters church, and The Church of St. Peter and St. Paul in Imbramowice, Lesser Poland Voivodeship (1716-1722), which included: six altars and religious statues. He also decorated pulpits and altarpieces for churches in and around Kraków.
