= Zofia Baltarowicz-Dzielińska =

Polish sculptor (1894–1970)

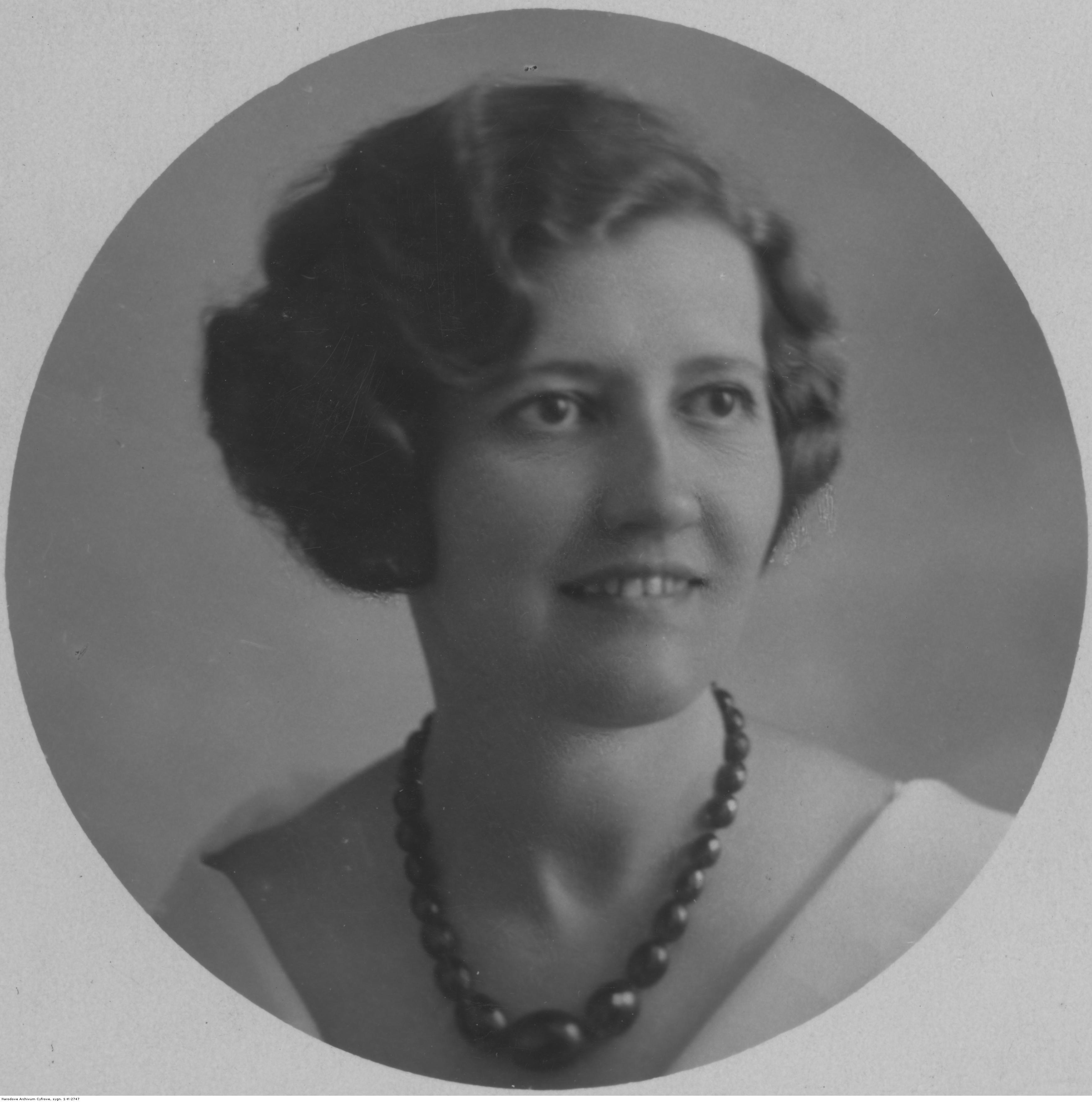
- Born: Zofia Janina Maria Baltarowicz; May 23, 1894; Staryi Yarychiv, Austria-Hungary
- Died: August 10, 1970 (aged 76); Kraków, Polish People's Republic
- Known for: sculpture

Zofia Janina Maria Baltarowicz-Dzielińska née Baltarowicz (1894–1970) was a Polish sculptor and the first woman to study at the Academy of Fine Arts in Kraków, Poland, after almost a century of its existence.

== Early life ==
Zofia Baltarowicz was born on 23 May 1894, in Staryi Yarychiv near Lviv, to a patriotic Polish family of Zofia Stefania née Weeber and Jan Baltarowicz. Zofia started to reveal her artistic talent early: when she was five years old, she started making clay figures. When she was a teen, her talents were noticed by the painter Zofia Gołąbowa, a graduate of Académie Julian, who became Zofia's first arts teacher. When she was fourteen, Zofia was already sure that she wanted to pursue artistic career, but had to face strong opposition from her mother, who feared that Zofia would become a "New Woman", instead of following the traditional domestic role models.

== Art education ==
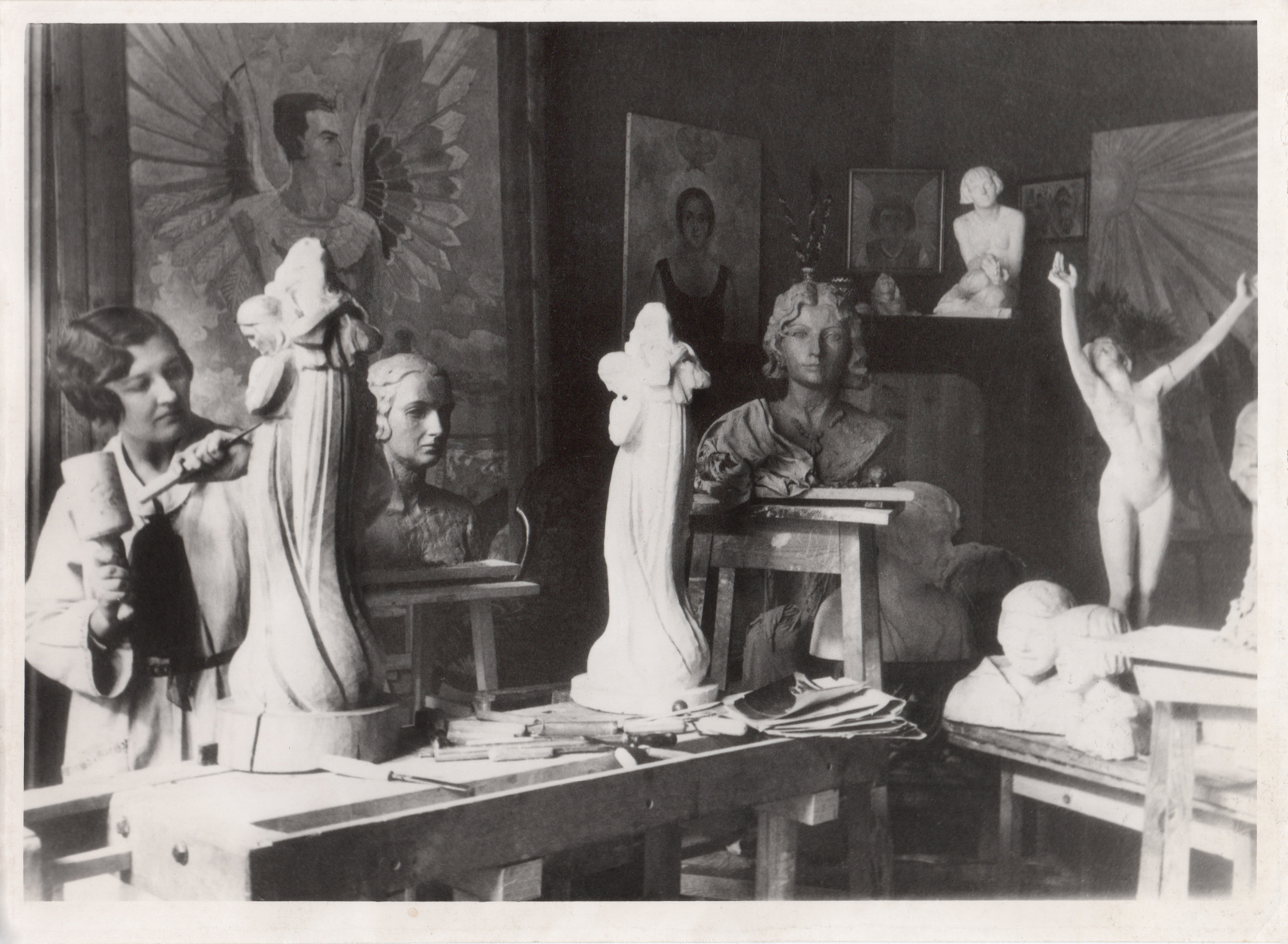
Baltarowicz-Dzielińska in her studio at 3 Kurkowa St. in Lviv

In 1912, Baltarowicz began attending private art classes of painter Stanisław Batowski and later sculptor Zygmunt Kurczyński in Lviv. She also took courses in philosophy with Kazimierz Twardowski at the University of Lviv. In 1916, she enrolled at the Kunstschule für Frauen in Vienna, but she was forced to abandon the studies after only a year, at the request of her mother, who wanted her to move closer to the family. Left without any other option, young Baltarowicz decided to try to enrol at the Academy of Fine Arts in Kraków, even though the institution did not accept women. After gaining a positive review of her work from the professors Jacek Malczewski and Konstanty Laszczka, rector of the academy Józef Mehoffer accepted her for a trial period, during which she was to create a sculpture to be then judged by the whole teaching staff. At the end of October 1917, the Senate officially accepted Zofia, but as an auditor, which meant that she would not have the right to receive a certificate confirming her studies. Thus, she became the first woman to be able to study at the academy, after almost a century of its existence, and helped to pave the way for other women. Officially, women were allowed to become students over a year later, after the academy passed a resolution in December 1918. In 1919, Zofia married Kazimierz Dzieliński. In 1920, after giving birth to her daughter Dorota Dzielińska, she had to interrupt her studies. She returned to complete her degree after World War II, when she was in her early fifties; the academy then recognised the years 1917–1920 as part of her official studies. Baltarowicz-Dzielińska attended the institution at the same time as her daughter, who also became a sculptor. Thanks to gaining the degree, Zofia could join the Association of Polish Artists and Designers and apply for fellowships.

== Career ==
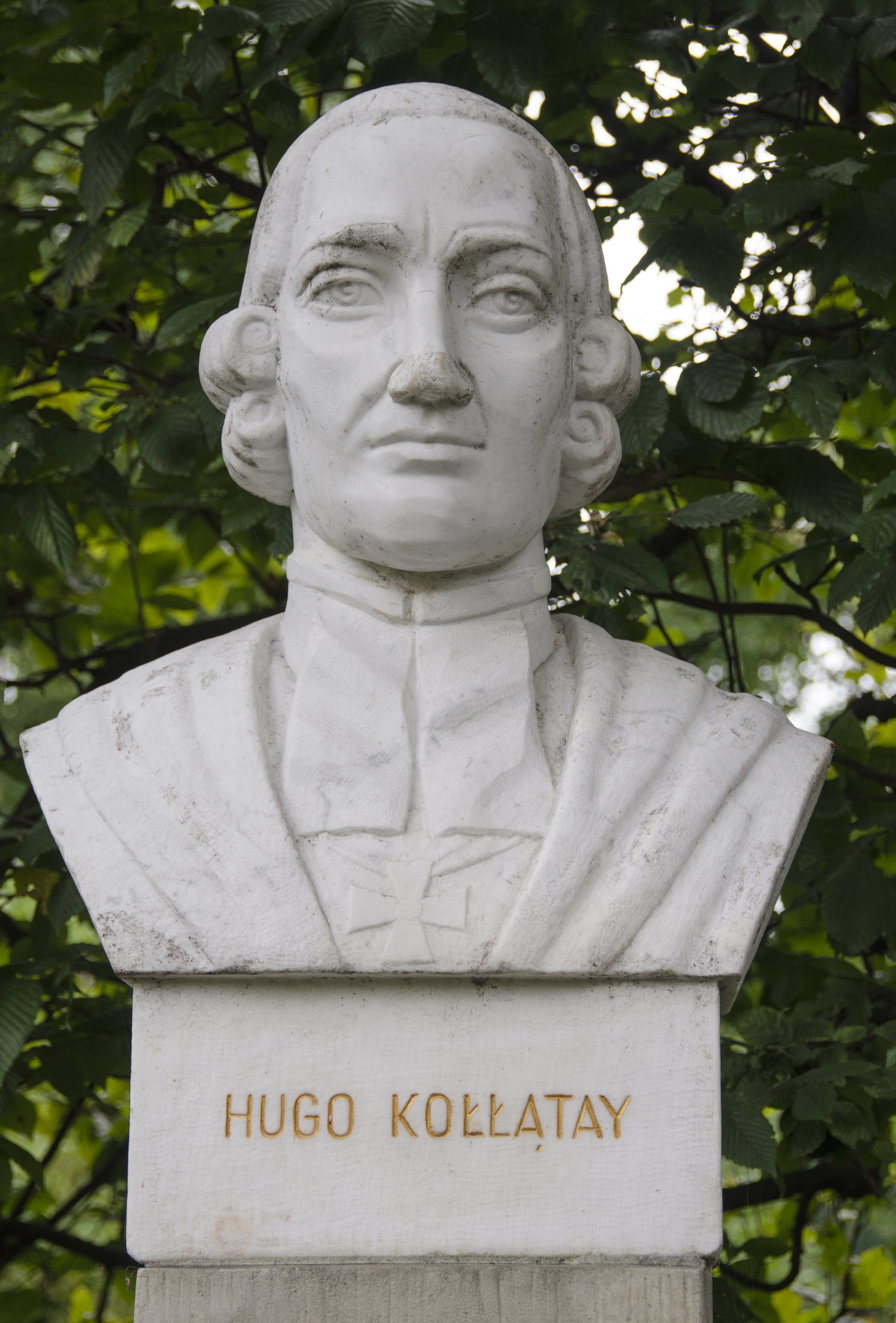
Baltarowicz-Dzielińska, the bust of Hugo Kołłątaj, Jordan Park, Kraków

Despite having a difficult life, Baltarowicz-Dzielińska persevered in making art. She took part in numerous group exhibitions in interwar Poland, such as the Spring and Fall Salons of Lviv, Warsaw, Poznań, Kraków and Zakopane, as well as Polish exhibitions after the war. Her works have been also shown outside Poland, for example in Paris, Carrara or Arezzo. She received a number of awards and recognitions, as well as the Cross of Valour for her activities as a war courier.

Many of her works were destroyed during World War II. Her bust of Hugo Kołłątaj can be seen at the Jordan Park in Kraków.

For a time, Baltarowicz-Dzielińska was also invested in anthroposophy, to which she was introduced in 1917 by a fellow artist Luna Drexler. In 1924, she joined the Polish branch of the Anthroposophical Society. Six years later, she led a lecture at the Lviv section of the Polish Society, and in 1932, she travelled to Paris, where she attended lectures and eurythmy classes at Rudolf Steiner's school. However, by 1931/1932, she no longer felt connected to the Society.

== Death ==
Baltarowicz-Dzielińska died on 10 August 1970, in Kraków. She is interred at the Rakowicki Cemetery.

== Bibliography ==
In 2018, Iwona Demko published a monograph on the life of Baltarowicz-Dzielińska, titled Zofia Baltarowicz-Dzielińska: pierwsza studentka Akademii Sztuk Pięknych w Krakowie, and published by the Academy of Fine Arts in Kraków.
