= Sasza Blonder =

Polish painter (1909–1949)

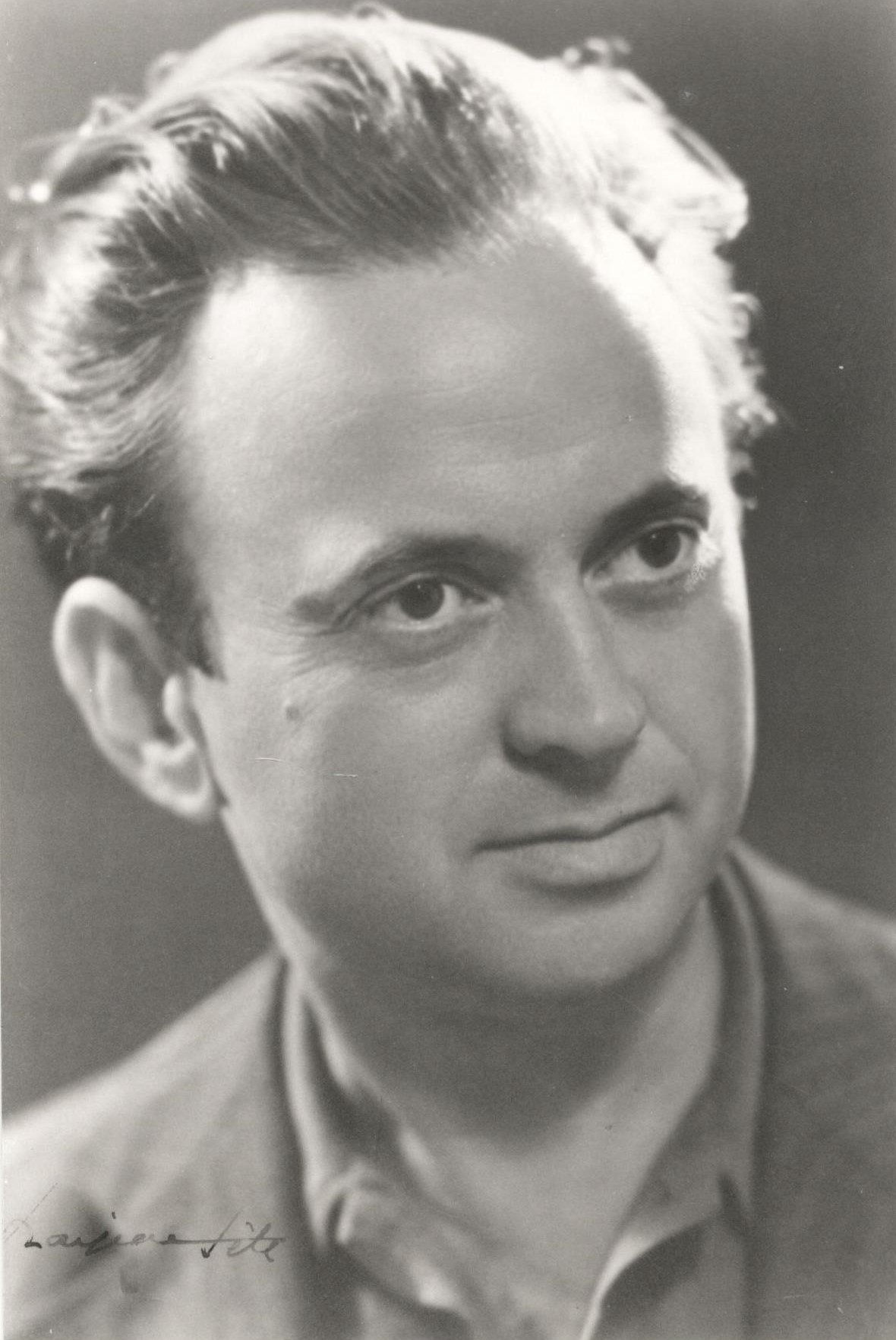
Sasza Blonder

Aleksander (Sasza) Blonder (Szaje Blonder, pseudonym André Blondel, born May 27, 1909 in Chortkiv, died June 22, 1949, in Paris) was a Polish painter, member of Kraków Group.

== Biography ==
Blonder was an architecture student at École nationale supérieure des beaux-arts in Paris and subsequently studied painting at the Academy of Fine Arts in Kraków from 1932 to 1936.

Moving back to Paris in 1937, he started his own studio using the pseudonym André Blondel.

He died of an accidental fall in 1949.
