= Marian Hess =

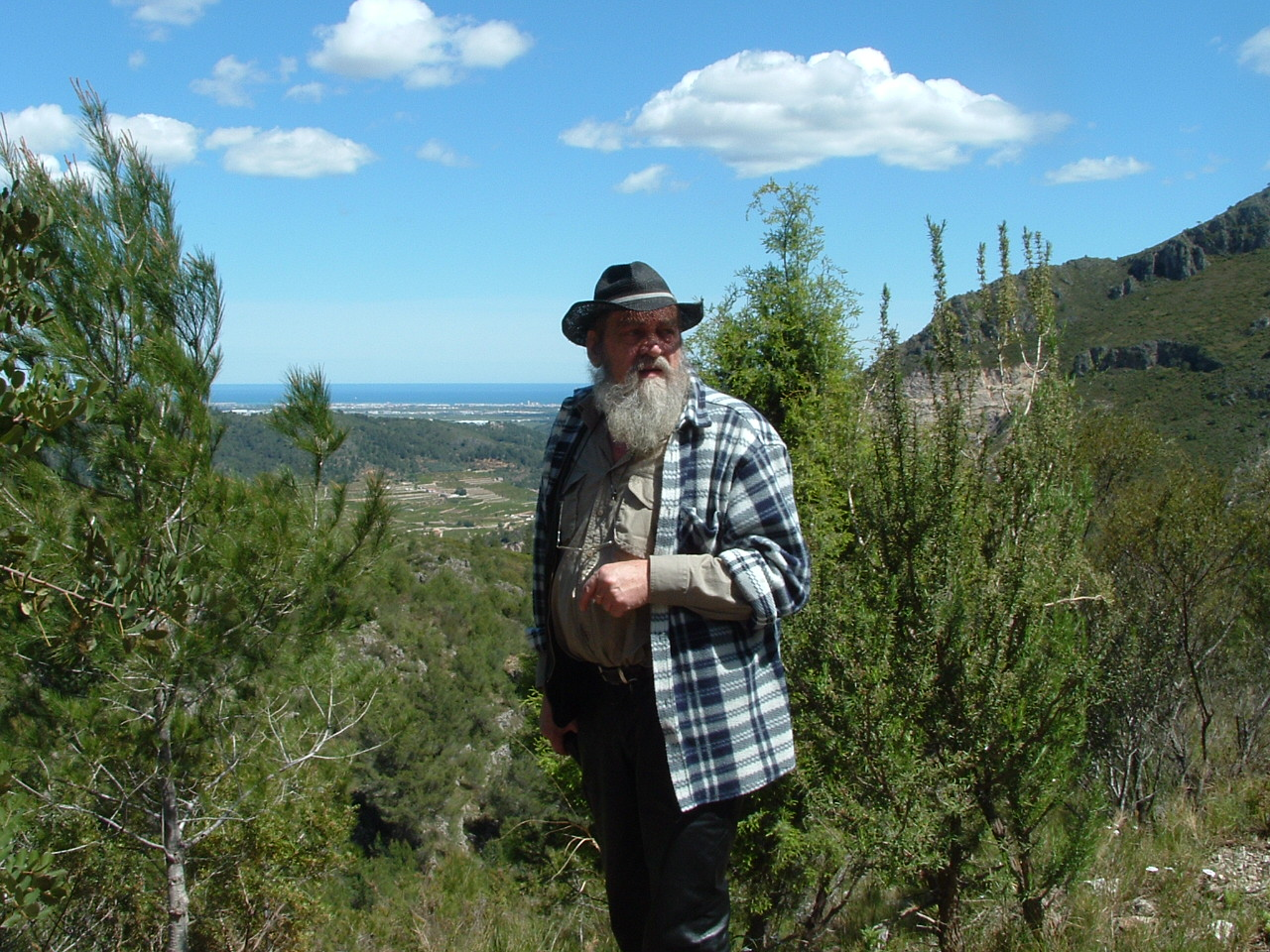
Marian Hess

Marian Richard Hess (November 21, 1941 in Polana, Bieszczady County, Poland – September 10, 2010 in Krefeld, Germany) was an ethnographer, sculptor, painter and enthusiast for local legends and traditions. Between 1968 and 1988 he lived and worked in Dwernik near Ustrzyki Dolne.

He created the regional legend of Bies and Czads. It was the inspiration of his later works. Around his house was an exhibition of sculptures, which both the scouts and tourists explored. Marian Hess told the visitors about the culture of the region.

In 1997 Hess and his wife Jozefa moved to Germany. In 2005 his first book Between dream and waking appeared. In 2007 the book was translated into German. Until his last days he lived in Krefeld in Westfalia and has been creating sculptures inspired by local legend of Gnoms and Kobolds.

After a long illness, he died in hospital in Krefeld on September 10, 2010.

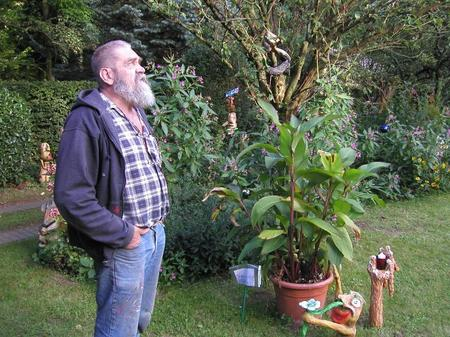
Marian Hess

== Honors and awards ==
- 1984 - deserved an activist culture (Ministry of Culture and National Heritage)
- 1997 - deserved of Bieszczady Mountains
- 2004 (June) - awarded the city Duisburg - Silbernen Ulli-Umwelt-Ehren-Nadel

== Publications ==
- Who I am. Between dreaming and waking ...; Atut, 2005, ISBN 83-7432-055-9
- Wo lebt mein Herz: Ein Künstler in den polnischen Karpaten; Fiber Verlag, 2007, ISBN 978-3-938400-26-5
