= Mateusz Kossior =

Polish painter and sculptor

Mateusz Kossior (also spelled Kosior, Kossiur, Kossyor) or Mateusz Koło, was a Polish painter and sculptor of the late Renaissance. His dates of birth and death are unknown but he was active in the 16th century.

Originally from Koło, Kossior relocated to Poznań, where in 1575 he appeared before the City Council to complain against the local painter's guild. The City Council hosted a performance by the artist featuring an image of Madonna and Child. In the years 1579-1595 he was a senior member to several painters' guilds, the Department of Crafts, and bookbinders group. He was a well known and respected artist, and his art earned him a small property in Poznan. He also lived and worked in Kłecko, where he produced an altarpiece for the church.

Kossior was influenced by Dutch and Italian paintings. Patrons of the artist included the noble family Czarnkowscy.

The artist had four children:

- Ewa, wife of Jakub Staniewski and later Tomasz Pełka, both goldsmiths
- Stanisław Kossior or Kossiorowicz (died 1626), a member of the painters' guild in Poznan, painted the high altar in Szamotuły
- Barbara
- Jadwiga
