= Tadeusz Kantor =

Polish painter (1915–1990)

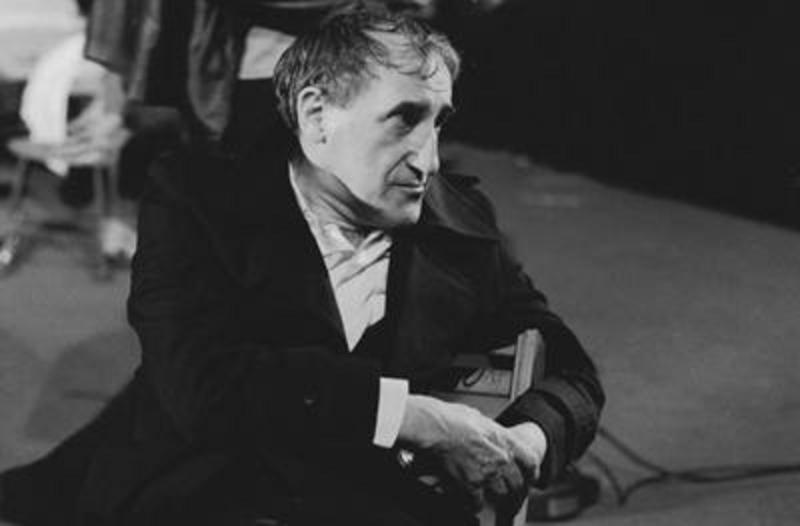
- Tadeusz Kantor
- Born: 6 April 1915; Wielopole Skrzyńskie, Kingdom of Galicia and Lodomeria, Austria-Hungary
- Died: 8 December 1990 (aged 75); Kraków, Poland
- Occupations: Theatre director, artist
- Notable work: Dead Class; Wielopole, Wielopole

Tadeusz Kantor (Polish pronunciation: [taˈdɛuʂ ˈkantɔr]; 6 April 1915 – 8 December 1990) was a Polish painter, assemblage and Happenings artist, set designer and theatre director. Kantor is renowned for his revolutionary theatrical performances in Poland and abroad. Laureate of Witkacy Prize – Critics' Circle Award (1989).

== Life and career ==
Kantor was born to Marian Kantor-Mirski and Helena Berger. His family were staunch Catholics. His mother was related to composer and conductor Krzysztof Penderecki, through her German father. Born in Wielopole Skrzyńskie, Galicia (then in Austria-Hungary, now in Poland), Kantor graduated from the Cracow Academy in 1939. During the Nazi occupation of Poland, he founded the Independent Theatre, and served as a professor at the Academy of Fine Arts in Kraków as well as a director of experimental theatre in Kraków from 1942 to 1944. After the war, he became known for his avant-garde work in stage design including designs for Saint Joan (1956) and Measure for Measure (1956). Specific examples of such changes to standard theatre were stages that extended out into the audience, and the use of mannequins instead of real-life actors.

In 1955, with a group of visual artists disenchanted with the growing institutionalization of avant-garde, he formed a new theatre ensemble called Cricot 2. In the 1960s, Cricot 2 gave performances in many theatres in Poland and abroad, gaining recognition for their stage happenings. His interest was mainly with the absurdists and Polish writer and playwright Stanisław Ignacy Witkiewicz (also known as "Witkacy"). Stage productions of Witkacy's plays The Cuttlefish (1956) and The Water Hen (1969) were regarded as his best achievements during this time. A 1972 performance of The Water Hen was described as "the least-publicised, most talked-about event at the Edinburgh festival".

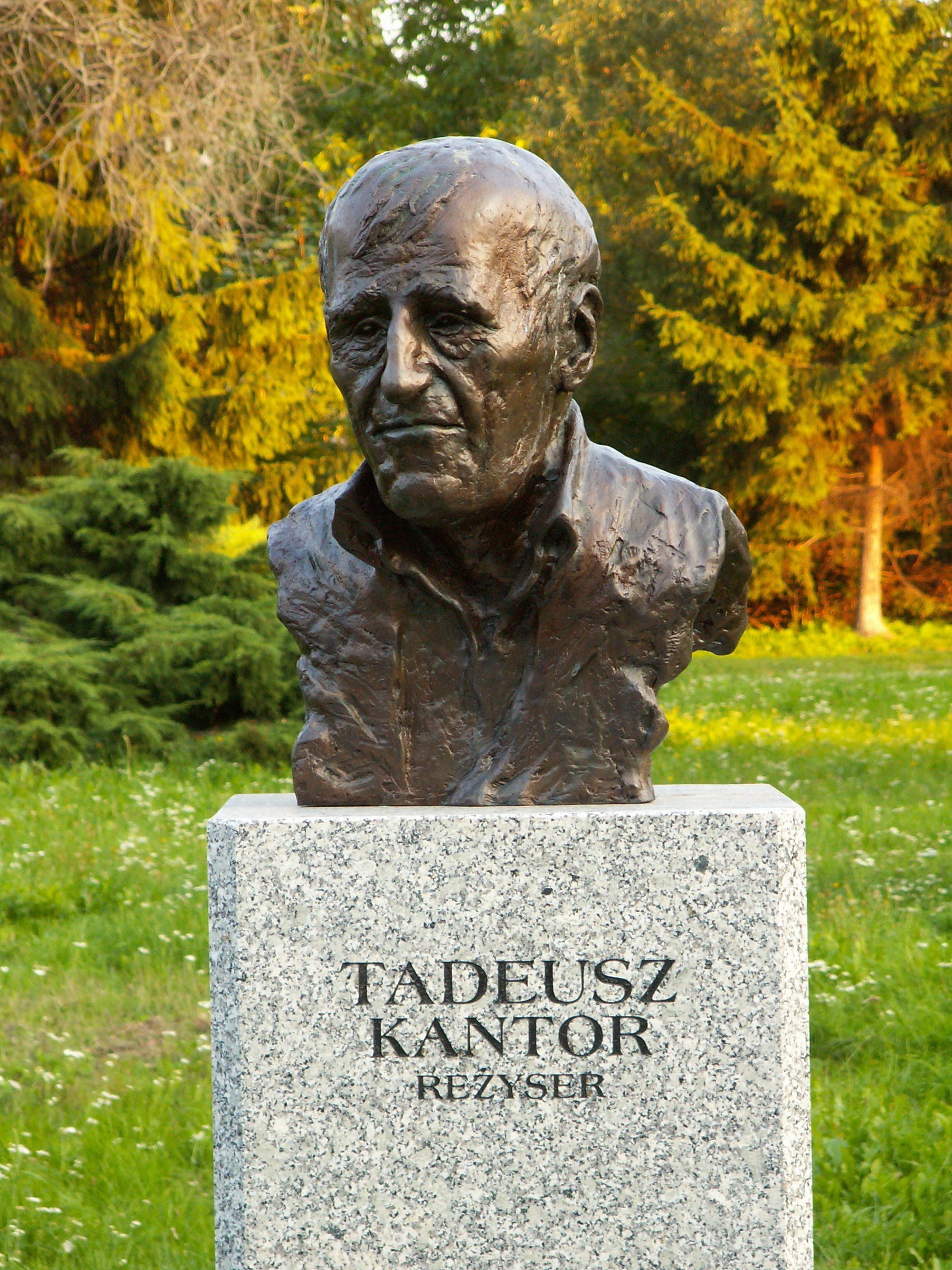
Tadeusz Kantor, commemorative bust by Kornel Arciszewski

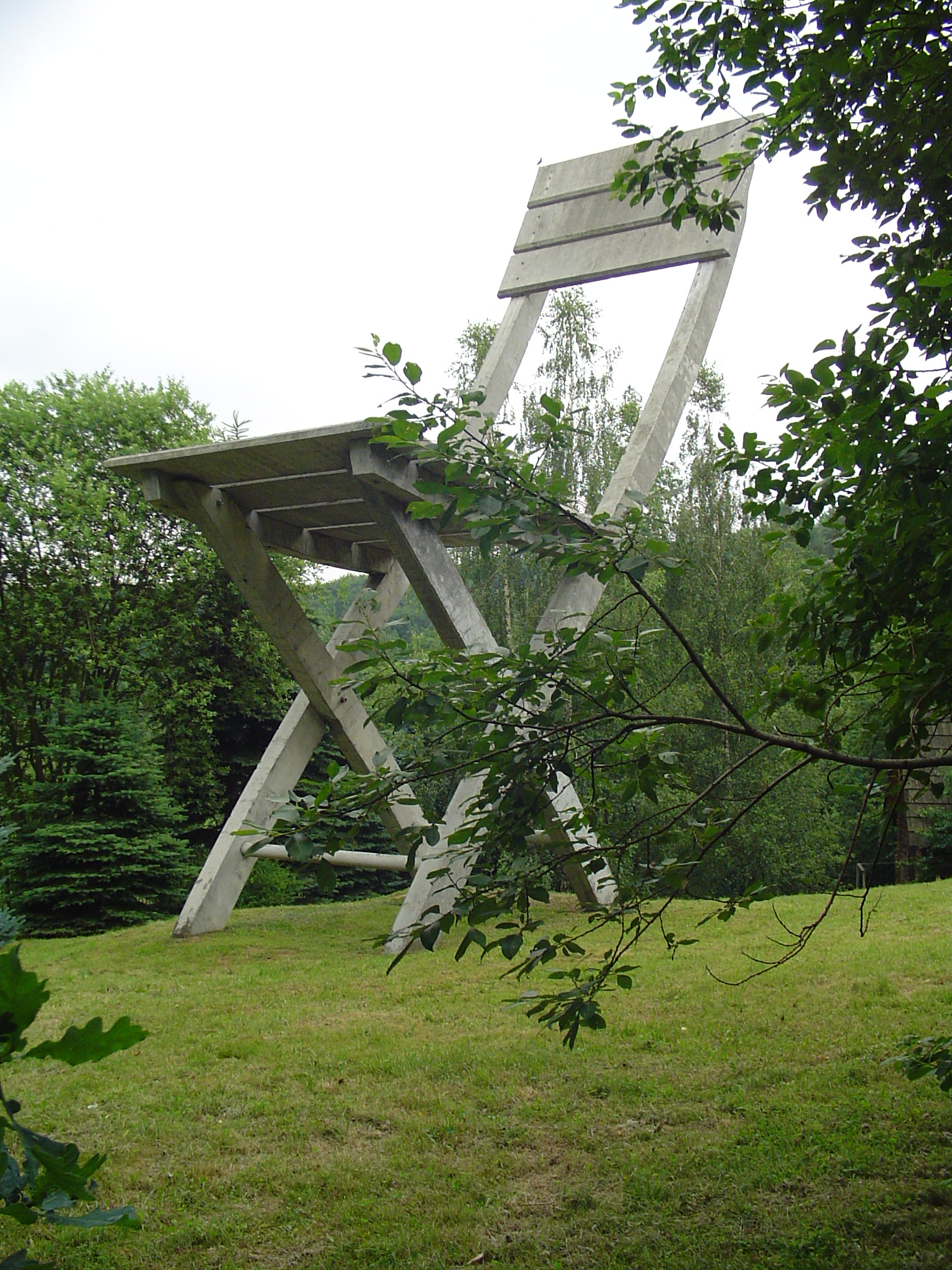
Tadeusz Kantor, Kantor's chair, concrete sculpture, height 14 m. Hucisko, Poland

Dead Class (1975) was the most famous of his theatre pieces of the 1970s. A TV-Movie of the production was made in 1977, directed by Andrzej Wajda. In that play, Kantor himself played the role of a teacher who presided over a class of apparently dead characters who are confronted by mannequins representing the characters' younger selves. He had begun experimenting with the juxtaposition of mannequins and live actors in the 1950s. In 1982, he was one of the artists participating in a cultural exchange between Muzeum Sztuki in Łódź and the Museum of Contemporary Art in Los Angeles.

His later works of the 1980s were very personal reflections. As in Dead Class, he would sometimes represent himself on stage. In the 1990s, his works became well known in the United States due to presentations at Ellen Stewart's La MaMa Experimental Theatre Club.

Throughout his life, Kantor had an interested and unique relationship with Jewish culture. Despite being a nominal Catholic, Kantor incorporated many elements of what was known as "Jewish theatre" into his works.

He died suddenly on December 8, 1990 in Kraków, after one of the last rehearsals of his playToday Is My Birthday. He is buried at Rakowicki Cemetery (plot LXXII-35-7).

The Centre for the Documentation of the Art of Tadeusz Kantor, Cricoteka was opened in Kraków in 2014.

== Major manifestos and writing ==
- The Autonomous Theatre (1963)
- Theatre Happening: The Theatre of Events (1967)
- The Informel Theatre (1961)
- The Zero Theatre (1963)
- The Theatre of Death (1975)

== Productions with Cricot 2 ==
- The Cuttlefish (1956)
- The Country House (1961)
- The Madman and the Nun (1963)
- The Water Hen (1965)
- Dainty Shapes and Hairy Apes, or the Green Pill (1972)
- The Dead Class (1975)
- Wielopole, Wielopole (1981)
- Let the Artists Die (1985)
- Macchina dell'amore e della morte (1987)
- I Shall Never Return (1989)
- Today Is My Birthday (1990)

== See also ==
- Culture of Kraków
