= Jan Matejko Academy of Fine Arts =

Art school in Kraków, Poland

Jan Matejko Academy of Fine Arts in Kraków
- Akademia Sztuk Pięknych im. Jana Matejki w Krakowie
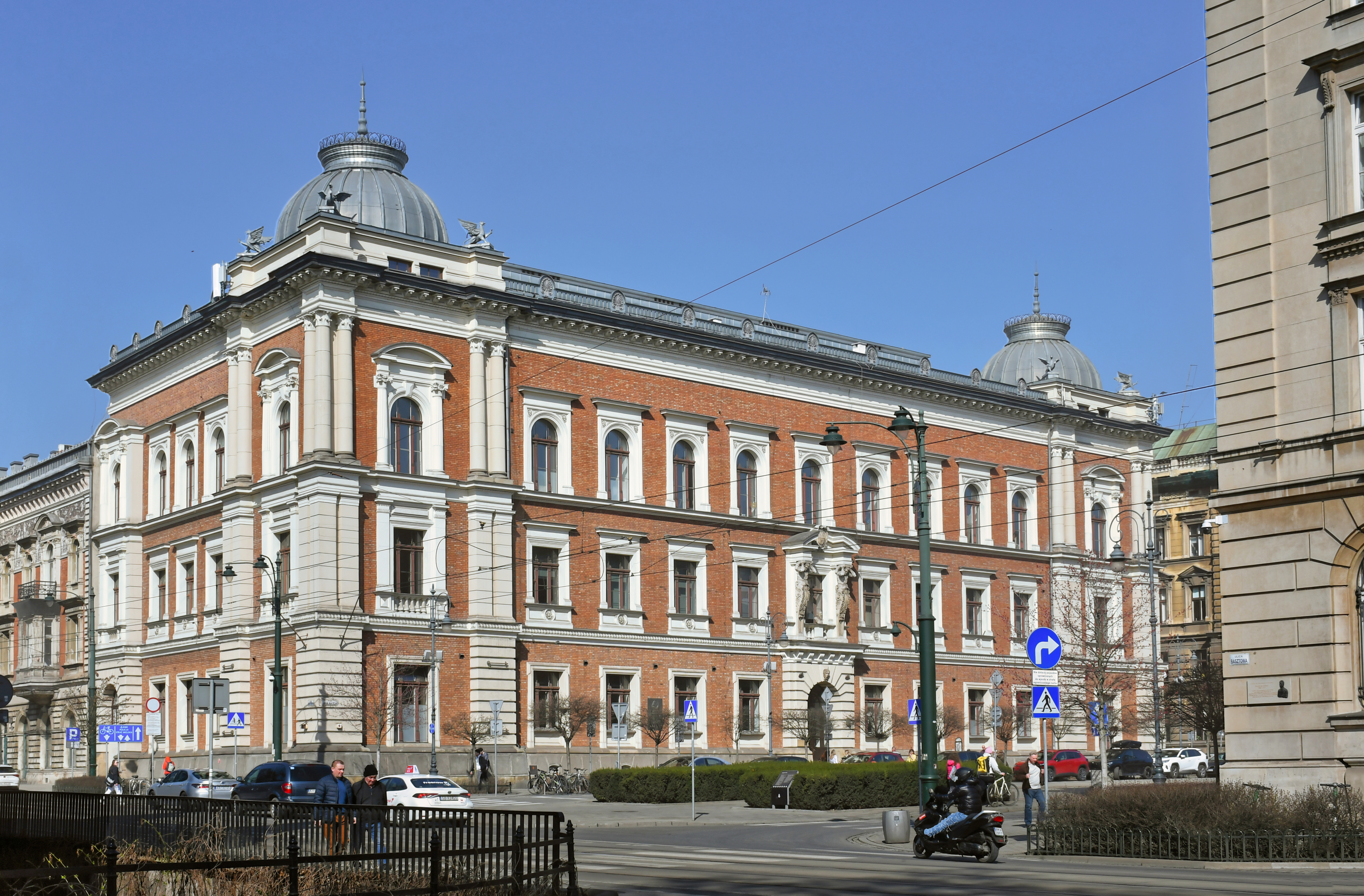
- Main building, on Jan Matejko Square
- Type: Public
- Established: 1818; 208 years ago
- Rector: prof. Andrzej Bednarczyk
- Academic staff: 321 (March 2022)
- Administrative staff: 149 (March 2022)
- Students: 972 (2021/2022)
- Location: Plac Matejki 13; 31–157 Kraków; Poland; 50°03′58.5″N 19°56′29″E
- Campus: Urban
- Website: www.asp.krakow.pl

Historic Monument of Poland
- Designated: 1994-09-08
- Part of: Kraków historical city complex
- Reference no.: M.P. 1994 nr 50 poz. 418

The Jan Matejko Academy of Fine Arts in Kraków (Polish: Akademia Sztuk Pięknych im. Jana Matejki w Krakowie, usually abbreviated to ASP), is a public institution of higher education located at 13 Matejki Square in Kleparz, the former district of Kraków, Poland. It is the oldest Polish fine art academy, established in 1818 and granted full autonomy in 1873.

ASP is a state-run university that offers 5- and 6-year Master's degree programmes. As of 2007, the Academy's faculty comprised 94 professors and assistant professors as well as 147 Ph.D.s.

== History ==
The Academy of Fine Arts (ASP) was originally a subdivision of the Jagiellonian University's Department of Literature and was initially (1818–1873) called the School of Drawing and Painting (Szkoła Rysunku i Malarstwa). Among its original teachers were Polish Neoclassicist Antoni Brodowski, and Franciszek Ksawery Lampi, a world-renowned landscape and portrait artist in Congress Poland whose most notable students there were Wojciech Korneli Stattler (a teacher of Jan Matejko) and Piotr Michałowski, equestrian master artist of the Romantic period.

ASP received the status of an independent institution of higher learning in 1873 as the School of Fine Arts (Szkoła Sztuk Pięknych). The first President of the Academy was painter Jan Matejko, who brought in other leading artists as professors including Jan Nepomucen Głowacki, the most outstanding landscape painter of the early 19th century in Poland, as well as Florian Cynk, Aleksander Gryglewski and Leopold Loeffler, member of the Vienna Academy of Fine Arts. The main building based on a neoclassical design by architect Maciej Moraczewski was erected in today's Matejko Square in 1879. In 1893–95 its principal was a broadly educated Władysław Łuszczkiewicz (another teacher of Jan Matejko and later, his close associate) who also served as conservator of architectural monuments in the city.

Following the death of Jan Matejko in 1893, the next ASP President elected in 1895 was Julian Fałat, who remained at his post until 1909. Fałat gave the Academy a new direction by hiring new art instructors associated with contemporary Western art approaches and associated painters such as Teodor Axentowicz, Jacek Malczewski (the father of Polish Symbolism), Jan Stanisławski, Leon Wyczółkowski, Konstanty Laszczka, Józef Mehoffer, Stanisław Wyspiański (one of first in Europe to work in all genres), Wojciech Weiss, and Józef Pankiewicz among others.

The first woman admitted to study at the Academy was Zofia Baltarowicz-Dzielińska, who, in 1917, gained a status of an auditor. Officially, women were allowed to become students over a year later, after the academy passed a resolution in December 1918.

On the 100th anniversary of its founding, in 1979, the Academy was named for Jan Matejko, its founder and first president.

In 2008 the Academy joined Icograda (the International Council of Graphic Design Associations) and became that organization's first educational member in Poland.

== Rectors ==
The School of Fine Arts (director)

- 1873–1893: Jan Matejko
- 1893–1895: Władysław Łuszczkiewicz (acting rector)
- 1895–1900: Julian Fałat

The Jan Matejko Academy of Fine Arts in Kraków (rector)

- 1900–1909: Julian Fałat (till 1905 director of The Jan Matejko Academy of Fine Arts)
- 1909–1910: Leon Wyczółkowski
- 1910–1911: Teodor Axentowicz
- 1911–1912: Konstanty Laszczka
- 1912–1914: Jacek Malczewski
- 1914–1918: Józef Mehoffer
- 1918–1919: Wojciech Weiss
- 1919–1922: Józef Gałęzowski
- 1922–1927: Adolf Szyszko-Bohusz
- 1927–1928: Teodor Axentowicz
- 1928–1929: Adolf Szyszko-Bohusz
- 1929–1931: Konstanty Laszczka
- 1931–1932: Fryderyk Pautsch
- 1932–1933: Józef Mehoffer
- 1933–1936: Wojciech Weiss
- 1936–1939: Fryderyk Pautsch
- 1945–1949: Eugeniusz Eibisch (till 1947 active rector)
- 1949–1950: Zbigniew Pronaszko
- 1950–1951: Zygmunt Radnicki
- 1951–1952: Konrad Srzednicki
- 1952–1954: Mieczysław Wejman
- 1954–1967: Czesław Rzepiński
- 1967–1972: Mieczysław Wejman
- 1972–1980: Marian Konieczny
- 1980–1987: Włodzimierz Kunz
- 1987–1993: Jan Szancenbach
- 1993–1996: Włodzimierz Kunz
- 1996–2002: Stanisław Rodziński
- 2002–2008: Jan Pamuła
- 2008–2012: Adam Wsiołkowski
- 2012–2020: Stanisław Tabisz
- 2020– : Andrzej Bednarczyk

== Faculties ==
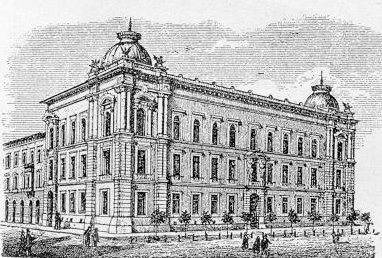
19th-century etching of the Academy, then named the "Kraków School of Drawing and Painting"

- Faculty of Painting
  - Department of Painting
  - Department of Drawing
  - Department of Additional Specializations
  - Department of Stage Design
- Faculty of Sculpture
  - Department of Sculpture (I, II)
  - Department of Drawing
  - Department of Architecture-Sculpture Design
- Faculty of Interior Design
- Faculty of Intermedia
- Faculty of Industrial Design
  - Department of Visual Communication
  - Department of Product Design
- Faculty of Graphic Arts
  - Department of Graphic Arts
  - Department of Graphic Design
  - Department of Drawing and Painting
- Faculty of Art Conservation
- Interdisciplinary Department of Art History

== Notable faculty members ==
- Miłosz Horodyski

== Notable graduates ==
- Bronisław Abramowicz
- Ludmila Armata
- Teodor Axentowicz
- Władysław T. Benda
- Sasza Blonder
- Tadeusz Brzozowski
- Rafał Bujnowski
- Julian Fałat
- Stanisław Frenkiel
- Henryk Gotlib
- Artur Grottger
- Zbylut Grzywacz
- Wojciech Jerzy Has
- Maria Jarema
- Ewa Juszkiewicz
- Tadeusz Kantor
- Carl Krull
- Ephraim Moses Lilien
- Tadeusz Makowski
- Jacek Malczewski
- Anton Manastyrski
- Jan Matejko
- Józef Mehoffer
- Henryk Minkiewicz
- Igor Mitoraj
- Abraham Neumann
- Jerzy Nowosielski
- Roman Petrović
- Roman Polanski
- Stanislaw Przespolewski
- Heinrich Rauchinger
- Tadeusz Rychter
- Wilhelm Sasnal
- Edward Rydz-Śmigły
- Czesław Słania
- Adam Studziński
- Boguslaw Szwacz
- Zoja Trofimiuk
- Petar Tiješić
- Stanisław Tondos
- Ivan Trush
- Andrzej Wajda
- Wojciech Weiss
- Andrzej Wróblewski
- Leon Wyczółkowski
- Stanisław Wyspiański
- Mariusz Zaruski

Axentowicz	Fałat	Malczewski	Matejko	Wyczółkowski	Wyspiański
Selfportraits of leading professors and graduates

== See also ==
- Culture of Kraków
- List of Poles
