= Cartoonfestival Knokke-Heist =

Annual international festival in the Belgian municipality Knokke-Heist

The Cartoon Festival of Knokke-Heist (Dutch: Cartoonfestival Knokke-Heist) is an annual international festival in the Belgian municipality Knokke-Heist showcasing cartoons from all over the world. Various prizes are also awarded during the festival, including the Golden Hat (Dutch: Gouden hoed), the most prestigious, as well as the Silver Hat (Dutch: Zilveren hoed) and the Bronze Hat (Dutch: Bronzen hoed). It is the oldest cartoon festival in the world, with the first edition taking place in 1962. A book of 100 selected cartoons is published annually.

== History ==
The first festival was organized in 1962 with the theme of tourists. About 25 Belgian cartoonists were approached. Among them were the cartoonists Bob de Moor and Marc Sleen. Other participants included Cram, Dani, GAL, GoT, Hugoké, Pil en Ploeg. The first festival was attended by 17,136 visitors. The first jury included Jos Ghysen, Gaston Durnez, Rik Sabbick and Luc Verstraete.

== Awards ==
Year	Golden Hat	Silver Hat	Bronze Hat	Knack Award	Audience Prize	Davidsfonds Cartoon Prize	Davids fonds Prize for Young Talent	The Davidsfonds Prize
2003	Michael Kountouris (Greece)	Ross Thomson (United Kingdom)	Domenico Sicolo (Italy)	Ciosu Constantin (Romania)	Liviu Stanilla (Romania)	N/A	N/A	N/A
2004	Yuri Ochakovsky (Israel/Russia)	Janusz Stefaniak (Poland)	Yevgeniy Samoylov (Ukraine)	Osmani Simanca (Brazil)	Ludo Goderis (Belgium)	N/A	Sven De Bock (Belgium)	N/A
2005	Ciosu Constantin (Romania)	Dieter Bevers (Belgium)	Herman Poppe (Belgium)	Pawel Kuczynski (Poland)	Virgil Militaru (Romania)	Luc Vermeersch (Belgium)	N/A	N/A
2006	Yuri Ochakovsky (Israel/Russia)	Khodayar Naroei (Iran)	Pol Leurs (Luxembourg)	Michael Permyakov (Russia)	Toon Beuckels (Belgium)	Ludo Goderis (Belgium)	N/A	N/A
2007	Alessandro Gatto (Italy)	Ari Plikat (Germany)	Yuriy Kosobukin (Ukraine)	Igor Kiyko (Kazakhstan)	Stefaan Provijn (Belgium)	Dieter Bevers (Belgium)	N/A	N/A
2008	Pawel Kuczynski (Poland)	Moacrir Gutteres (Brazil)	Pol Leurs (Luxembourg)	Masafumi Kikuchi (Japan)	Jean Uytterelst (Belgium)	Kenny Zoutendijk (Belgium)	N/A	N/A
2009	Musa Gümüs (Turkey)	Ludo Goderis (Belgium)	Alessandro Gatto (Italy)	Michael Kountouris (Greece)	Pedro Mendez Suarez (Cuba)	Luc Vermeersch (Belgium)	N/A	N/A
2010	Ludo Goderis (Belgium)	Pawel Kuczynski (Poland)	Constantin Sunnerberg (Belgium)	Ren Jian (Cuba)	Pedro Mendez Suarez (Cuba)	Luc Vernimmen (Belgium)	N/A	N/A
2011	Pol Leurs (Luxembourg)	Stefaan Provijn (Belgium)	Mohamad Ali Khoshman (Iran)	Vladimir Stankovski (Serbia)	Felipe Galindo (United States)	Herman Danneels (Belgium)	N/A	N/A
2012	Krzysztof Konopelski (Poland)	Ahmet Aykanat (Turkey)	Markus Grolik (Germany)	N/A	Virgil Militaru (Romania)	Jo Van Damme (Belgium)	N/A	N/A
2013	Spiro Radulovic (Serbia)	Nicola Hendrickx (Belgium)	Victor Crudu (Moldova)	N/A	N/A	N/A	N/A	N/A
2014	Dieter Bevers (Belgium)	Kiliçaslan Musa* (Turkey)	Katz Grigori (Israel)	N/A	N/A	N/A	N/A	
2015	Vladimir Stankovski (Serbia)	Klaus Pitter (Austria)	Mark Lynch (Australia)	N/A	N/A	N/A	N/A	Alfons Vos (Belgium)
2016	Dalcio Machado (Brazil)	Engin Selçuk (Turkey)	Slawomir Makal (Poland)	N/A	N/A	N/A	N/A	
2017	Xavier Bonilla (Ecuador)	Zbigniew Wowniak (Poland)	Alexandrov Vasiliy (Russia)	N/A	N/A	N/A	N/A	Luc Descheemaeker (Belgium)
2018	Saeed Sadeghi (Iran)	Vasco Cargalo (Portugal)	Ivailo Tsvetkov (Bulgaria)	N/A	N/A	N/A	N/A	‘Fhoomp!’ (Belgium)
2019	'Nirgen' (Israel)	Dimitrios Georgopalis (Greece)	Agim Sulaj (Italy)	N/A	N/A	N/A	N/A	Alfons Vos (Belgium)
2020	Doede Okkema (Netherlands)	Hamid Ghalijari (Iran)	Luis Demetrio Calvo Solis (Costa Rica)	N/A	N/A	N/A	N/A	Luc Vernimmen (Belgium)
2021	Javad Takjoo (Iran)	Philipp Sturm (Germany)	Engin Selçuk (Turkey)	N/A	N/A	N/A	N/A	‘Fhoomp!’ (Belgium)
2022	Elvandro Alves (Brazil)	‘Fhoomp!’ (Belgium)	Ba Bilig (China)	N/A	N/A	N/A	N/A	Stefaan Provijn (Belgium)
2023	Doede Okkema (Netherlands)	Ghislain Vermote (Belgium)	Ludo Goderis (Belgium)	N/A	N/A	N/A	N/A	Ludo Goderis (Belgium)
2024	Ernst (Austria)	Jona Jamart (Belgium)	Oleksiy Kustovsky (Ukraine)	N/A	N/A	N/A	N/A	N/A

* The 2014 Silver Hat was initially awarded to Iranian Mohammadreza Babaei, who was later disqualified as the cartoon he submitted was plagiarized from a design by Milton Graser.

== Panel/jury ==
- 2003: Guido Depraetere, Peter van Straaten, Stefan Verwey, Dirk Denoyelle, Kim Duchateau, Zaza
- 2004: Guido Depreatere, Inge Heremans, Bart Schoofs, Karl Meersman, Carry Goossens, Peter Frison
- 2005: Guido Depraetere, Jeroom, Canary Pete, Steve, Marec
- 2006: Guido Depraetere, Karl Meersman, Lies Maertens, Quirit, Ilah, Katrien De Vreese
- 2007: Marec, Kim, Peter Nieuwendijk, Bob Vincke, Hein De Meyere, Katrien De Vreese
- 2008: Bob Vincke, Ludo Goderis, Kurt Defrancq, Katrien De Vreese, Dieter Bevers
- 2009: Karl Meersman, Kim Duchateau, Steven Degryse, Katrien De Vreese, Rudy Gheysens
- 2010: Rudy Gheysens, Katrien De Vreese, Steven Degryse, Guido Packolet, Pieter De Poortere, Bart Stolle
- 2011: Frank JMA Castelyns, Kurt Valkeneers, Steven Degryse, Steve Michiels, Luc Janssen, Katrien De Vreese, Guido Packolet
- 2012: Geert Hoste, Fleur Van Groningen, Jonas Geirnaert, Sam De Graeve, Inge Heremans, Urbanus, Katrien De Vreese
- 2024: Pieter De Poortere, Steven Degryse, Laura Janssens, Karl Meersman, Prudence Geerts, Tine Anthoni, Steve Michiels, Kim Duchateau, cartoonist KIM, Toon Horsten
