= Evviva Il Papa =

1969 protest song by Belgian singer Hugo Raspoet

Song by Hugo Raspoet

from the album Raspoet
- Language: Dutch
- Released: 1971
- Recorded: 1969
- Genre: Easy listening
- Length: 4:42
- Label: Disques Vogue
- Songwriter: Hugo Raspoet
- Producer: Roland Verlooven

"Evviva Il Papa" is a 1969 protest song by Belgian singer Hugo Raspoet, which caused controversy and a media ban for criticizing the Pope and the Vatican. Alongside "Helena" it is Raspoet's second most famous song.

== Lyrics ==
In 1969, Raspoet wrote the song "Evviva Il Papa", which criticized the Pope's conservative ideology, papal infallibility, corruption, ban on anticonception and Pius XII's alleged silence during World War II, when the Nazis prosecuted Jewish people.

== Controversy ==
The song was banned from radio and TV airplay and Raspoet was often forbidden to perform it on stage. When he ignored the ban and tried to perform it one time in Borgerhout the police forced him to leave the stage. Johan Anthierens, who had a radio show about chanson, protested the ban by not playing the record on the air, but reading its lyrics to the listeners. He was still fired nevertheless.
