= Joanna Hoffmann-Dietrich =

Dr. Joanna Hoffmann-Dietrich (born 1968 in Poznań) is an artist and academic and a professor at the University of Fine Arts in Poznań in Poland and a Fellow of the Ministry of Culture and National Heritage in Poland.

From 1987 to 1992 Hoffmann-Dietrich studied for her degree at the Academy of Fine Arts in Poznań (now the University of Fine Arts) before starting her MA in 1992 and gained her PhD in 2000.

Hoffmann-Dietrich mostly works in the fields of multimedia installations, experimental video-animation, and book art. She has been a professor at the University of Fine Arts in Poznań since 2009 and head of the Studio for Transdisciplinary Projects and Research. She is also co-founder and Chair of the Art and Science Node in Berlin and the Club for Science and Art in Poznań. Her artistic works have been widely presented including at the Center for Contemporary Arts in Warsaw; the Science Museum/DANA Centre in London; ICA in London; Transmediale in Berlin; the European Patent Office in Berlin; WRO Media Art Biennale in Wroclaw, and at the MUSE Centre of Photography and Moving Image in New York. Her art residences include the German Cancer Research Center /Heidelberg University; Academy of Film and Television in Potsdam-Babelsberg; Srishti School of Art Design and Technology and the National Centre for Biological Sciences in Bangalore; KHOJ, International Artists' Association and the International Centre for Genetic Engineering and Biotechnology in New Delhi.

Her solo exhibitions include: 'a few steps above, a few degrees aside' at the Kingsgate Gallery in London (1995); 'Up and Down' at the Commercial Gallery in London (1997); 'Between distances' at the Galerie Horst Dietrich in Berlin (2004); 'Walls' at the Bereznitsky Gallery in Berlin (2007); 'Microscape' at the Poznań Science Centre of the Polish Academy of Sciences (2015), and 'Avant-gout of epiMesis for the new holoWorld' at the Central European Congress of Biotechnology in Krakow (2017).
