= Schipper naast Mathilde =

Television series

- Book cover of the series
- Genre: Sitcom
- Country of origin: Belgium
- Original language: Dutch
- No. of episodes: 185

Original release
- Network: N.I.R. (nowadays the VRT)
- Release: May 10, 1955 – July 19, 1963

Schipper naast Mathilde (Skipper next to Mathilde) was a Flemish TV sitcom, broadcast between 1955 and 1963 on the Flemish public service TV station N.I.R. (nowadays the VRT). At the time it was tremendously successful and it is well regarded as the first classic TV series of Flemish television. About 185 episodes were made, but since many of them went live in the air without recording a copy the majority are lost today. Another part was lost in a fire. In 2005 a DVD was made available which contains all the remaining episodes, nine in total.

== Concept ==
Schipper naast Mathilde took place in a typical Flemish village. It revolved around a former skipper (Nand Buyl), his sister Mathilde (Jetje Cabanier), their adopted daughter Marianne (Francine De Weerdt, later Chris Lomme), the nosy neighbour Madame Krielemans, the stuttering and posh Philidoor, the stupid Sander and his friend Hyppoliet Maréchal, who tried to talk French, but always made language mistakes. When people corrected him he always replied: "That's what I said!". The family also had a parrot, Jules, who often commented on the proceedings in the house.

== Behind the scenes ==
Originally the N.I.R. only planned 13 episodes. The series was originally going to be named "Het Koperen Anker" or "De avonturen van kapitein Biebuyck," centering around a former army colonel. Since there was an actual military captain with that name who overheard the plans this idea was scrapped.

In 1959 the character Marianne was written out of the series and replaced by a new character, Marieke. The actress who played Marianne, Francine De Weerdt, was replaced by Chris Lomme. Nand Buyl, who played the skipper, developed a love affair with Lomme and the couple later married.

Theologian Max Wildiers wrote scripts for the series, as well as Anton van Casteren, Rik de Bruyn, and Gerard Walschap.

== Cast ==
- Nand Buyl – Matthias
- Jetje Cabanier – Mathilde
- Chris Lomme – Marieke (1959-1963)
- Tuur Bouchez – Philidoor
- Jan Reusens – Sander
- Fientje Blockmans – Jules the parrot
- Francine De Weerdt – Marianneke (1955-1959)
- René Peeters – Hyppoliet
- Josée Puissant – Madam Krielemans

== Popularity and legacy ==
The series' popularity thrived on farcical situations and the fact that all the characters spoke in the dialect of the province Antwerp. While "Schipper naast Mathilde" was very popular in the late 1950s and early 1960s the program has seldom been repeated on TV since. This has to do with the fact that only nine episodes remain available today, but also because the show itself is extremely out-dated. In terms of television direction it's comparable to a filmed theatrical play.

In 1955 Willy Vandersteen made a celebrity comics newspaper comic strip based on the success of the TV show, drawn by his assistants Eduard de Rop and Gene Deschamps, but it didn't last long. In 1960 Eddy Ryssack and Johan Anthierens also made a comic strip based on the show, De geheime avonturen van Kapitein Matthias (The secret adventures of Captain Matthias), which was published in Humo. A series of novelisations was also published, as well as an audio play released on vinyl record.
