= Hugo Raspoet =

Flemish singer and guitarist

- Raspoet in 2012

Background information
- Born: Hugo Raspoet; 2 November 1940; Ganshoren, Belgium
- Died: 3 October 2018 (aged 77) Leuven, Belgium
- Genres: Kleinkunst, folk
- Occupation: Songwriter
- Instrument: Guitar
- Years active: 1962–1973

Hugo Raspoet (2 November 1940 – 3 October 2018) was a Flemish kleinkunst singer and guitarist. He is most famous for his signature song "Helena" (1970) and the controversial song "Evviva Il Papa" (1969), which was banned from the radio for criticizing the Pope.

== Life and career ==
Raspoet was born in Ganshoren. He studied Latin philology at the University of Leuven and became a translator at the Flemish public TV channel afterwards. He was a contestant during the musical talent show Ontdek de Ster in 1962, where he performed the song "Mijn Koningskind". He released a few EPs, but later, under influence of Bob Dylan, Jacques Brel and Georges Brassens, changed his style to more introspective, poetic and socially conscious lyrics. In 1969, his song "Evviva Il Papa" caused controversy because it attacked both the Pope as well as the Vatican. It was banned from radio and TV airplay and Raspoet was often forbidden to perform it on stage. When he ignored the ban and tried to perform it one time in Borgerhout the police forced him to leave the stage. Johan Anthierens, who had a radio show about chanson, protested the ban by not playing the record on the air, but reading its lyrics for the listeners. He was still fired nevertheless.

In 1970, Raspoet released his first and only album, Raspoet, of which the song "Helena" became a hit. Despite his success, the singer still chose to end his musical career in 1973, and returned to his former profession as translator for the Flemish public TV channel.

== Death ==
He died in 2018, in Leuven.

== Discography ==
- Mijn Koningskind (EP, 1962)
- Korenbloem (EP, 1963)
- Zoals ik eenmaal beminde (EP)
- Raspoet (LP, 1970)
- "Dag Lief / De Zon" (single, 1971)
- Alles van Hugo Raspoet (double LP)
