= Johan Anthierens =

Belgian journalist, columnist, publicist, critic and writer

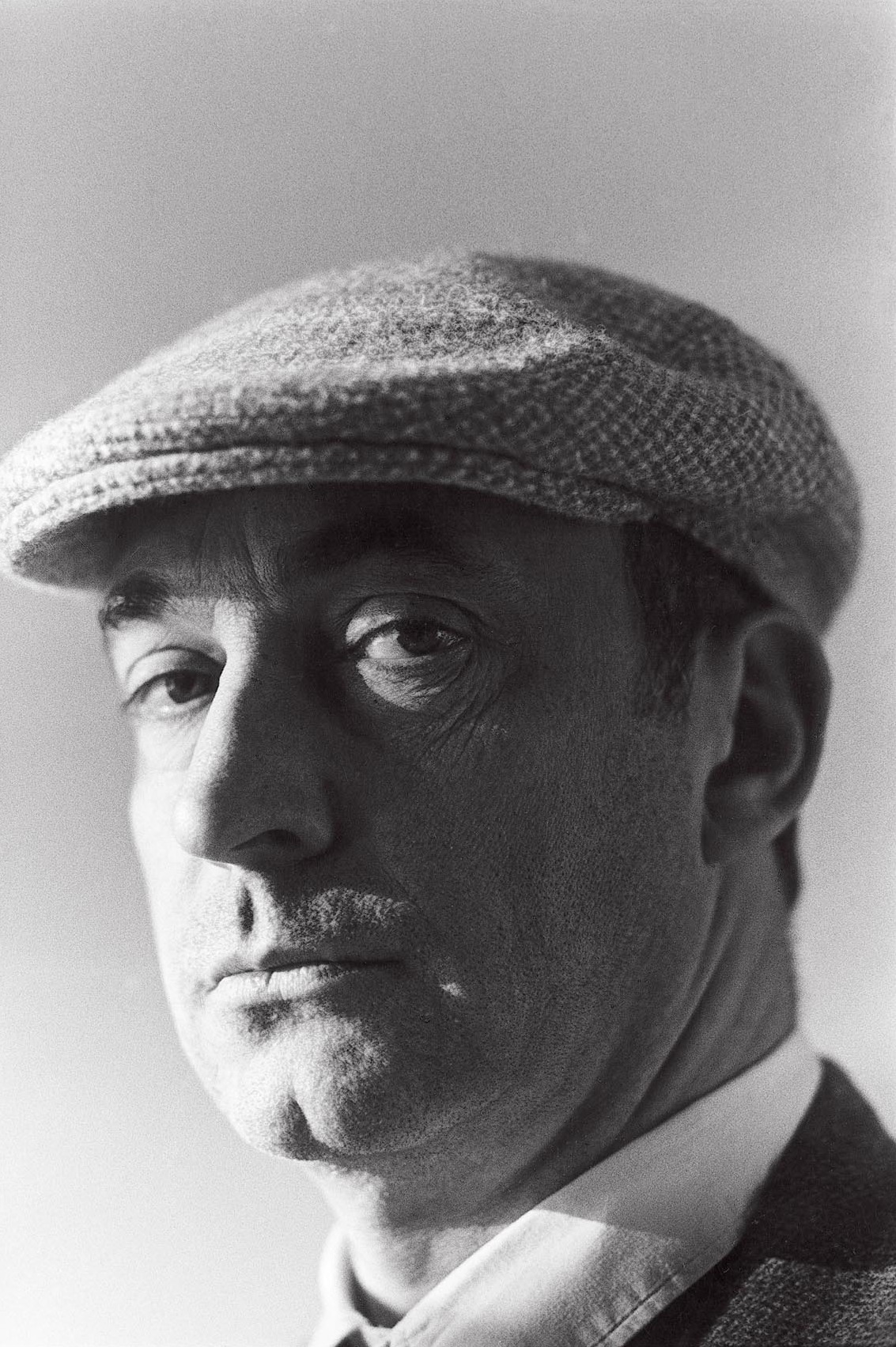
- Johan Anthierens, 1986.
- Born: 22 August 1937; Machelen, Belgium
- Died: 20 March 2000 (aged 62); Dilbeek, Belgium
- Occupations: critic, journalist, publicist, writer

Johan Anthierens (22 August 1937 – 20 March 2000) was a Belgian journalist, columnist, publicist, critic and writer. He became notorious because of his socially conscious columns, as well as his equally controversial opinions during interviews. He published both in HUMO as well as Knack and founded his own short-lived satirical magazine, De Zwijger in 1982-1985. The general public got to know him thanks to his television appearances, both as panel member in the quiz De Wies Andersen Show and as interviewer in the talkshow Noord-Zuid (North-South). Due to his confrontational criticism of capitalism, the monarchy, the Church, the establishment and the far-right movement Anthierens had both a lot of admirers as well as many enemies. Still, together with Louis De Lentdecker and Maurice De Wilde, he was widely regarded as one of the "Big Three" of Flemish critical journalism.

== Press career ==
Anthierens was born at Machelen (Flemish Brabant) in 1937 as part of a huge family with seven daughters and five sons. He was the youngest of the family. His older brothers Karel Anthierens and Jef Anthierens also became famous journalists in Flanders. Thanks to them he became chief design for HUMO in the 1950s and 1960s, but also worked for De Post and Mimo. In the 1970s he received his own column in Knack, where he initially was only supposed to review TV shows, but after a while he used it as an outlet for every subject in society that bothered him, always written with a healthy dose of irony and sarcasm. Many readers wrote letters of complaint and after a while no magazine was willing to let him publish on their pages anymore.

In 1960 he and Eddy Ryssack also made a comic strip, De geheime avonturen van Kapitein Matthias (The secret adventures of Captain Matthias), based on the popularity of the TV show Schipper naast Mathilde. The comic was published in HUMO.

== Radio and television ==
Anthierens was known for his love of chanson, especially the anarchic lyrics of Léo Ferré, Georges Brassens and Jacques Brel. In the 1960s he presented his own radioshow, Charme van het Chanson on public radio and played both French-language songs as well as Dutch and Flemish kleinkunst. He provoked the censors by giving a banned song by Ferré airplay and ducked another ban by reading the lyrics of Hugo Raspoet's anti-papal song "Evviva Il Papa" out loud rather than play the song. Anthierens was fired afterwards. In 1998 Anthierens would write a biography about Brel, called "De passie en de pijn" ("The passion and the pain"), which was a personal declaration of his love for the man's music, complete with interviews he conducted with him in the past.

From 1976 on Anthierens was a panel member in the TV quiz show De Wies Andersen Show. In the first episode he caused a media scandal by claiming: "I am happily divorced." Together with Monica Moritz and Guido Depraetere he presented "Bij Nader Inzien". In 1978 he hosted the talkshow Noord-Zuid (North-South), together with Dutch TV presenter Mies Bouwman. In one episode Dutch singer Vader Abraham was the guest of the evening. Anthierens made no secret of his hatred of the man's music and after he insinuated that the singer had not paid Peyo the rights to make a hit song about The Smurfs Abraham stood up and left the show in anger. This was not the first incident, as earlier he had also criticized Will Tura and Leo Tindemans, but Abraham's departure caused such a media storm that Anthierens was fired. Bouwman was offered to continue the show with a different host, but she declined this offer and thus the entire program was cancelled.

== De Zwijger ==
In 1982 Anthierens quit his job at Knack to start his own magazine, De Zwijger (The Silent One). It was inspired by Le Canard Enchaîné and intended as a satirical and opinionated news magazine. Unfortunately it remained nothing more than a cult magazine and as Anthierens was unable to combine his writings with running the magazine in general it was disestablished in 1985.

== Later years ==
Anthierens had made so many enemies over the years that he hardly found work in other magazines. He was allowed back on television, however, and made a travel show about his idols Willem Elsschot and Jacques Brel, about whom he also wrote books, one published in 1992, the other in 1998. In 1994 he was co-presenter of the archive show "Gisteren Gekeken?" (1994-1996). During his later years he was best known for writing personal essays and books criticizing the Belgian monarchy, the influence of the Roman Catholic Church, commercialization and sensationalism in Flemish media and the rise of the far-right. He also wrote a book about Irma Laplasse, a Flemish collaborator during World War II ("Zonder Vlagvertoon") and the resistance leader Albert Vandamme. He also wrote the text for a book about GAL, one of his friends.

Anthierens was also popular in the Netherlands and a frequent guest in the Amsterdam Center for Flemish Culture "De Brakke Grond. He also published in de Volkskrant.

== Death ==
In 2000 Anthierens died at the age of 62 of Hodgkin's disease. At his funeral GAL was one of the pall-bearers.

== Recognition ==
- 1975: Yang Prize for his weekly column in Knack
- 1979: First Geuzen Prize for 'the independence with which he attacked dogmas and narrow-mindedness as a journalist and author'.

== Bibliography ==
Works (a selection)

- 1976 De flauwgevallen priester op mijn tong: vijftien op prijs gestelde Ooggetuige-kronieken, Knack – jaargang 1975. Walter Soethoudt, Antwerpen.
- 1986 Het Belgische domdenken: smaadschrift, Kritak, Leuven.
- 1990 Brief aan een postzegel: kritisch koningsboek, Kritak, Leuven (about the monarchy).
- 1992 Willem Elsschot. Het Ridderspoor, Kritak, Leuven.
- 1993 Tricolore tranen: Boudewijn en het augustusverdriet, EPO, Berchem.
- 1995 Vaarwel, mijn 1995, EPO, Berchem.
- 1995 Zonder vlagvertoon, Van Halewijck, Leuven (about the Resistance during WW2).
- 1996 De overspannen jaren. Opgetekend van 1960 tot 1996 (met Gerard Alsteens), EPO, Berchem.
- 1996 De IJzertoren. Onze trots en onze schande, Van Halewijck, Leuven.
- 1998 Jacques Brel. De passie en de pijn, L. J. Veen, Amsterdam.

Autobiography

- 2003 Leve Mij . Niemands meester, niemands knecht (part 1) (compiled by Brigitte Raskin & Karel Anthierens), Van Halewijck, Leuven.
- 2005 Ooggetuige. Niemands meester, niemands knecht (part 2), Van Halewijck, Leuven.

== See also ==
- Flemish literature
