= Protest art =

Creative works produced by activists

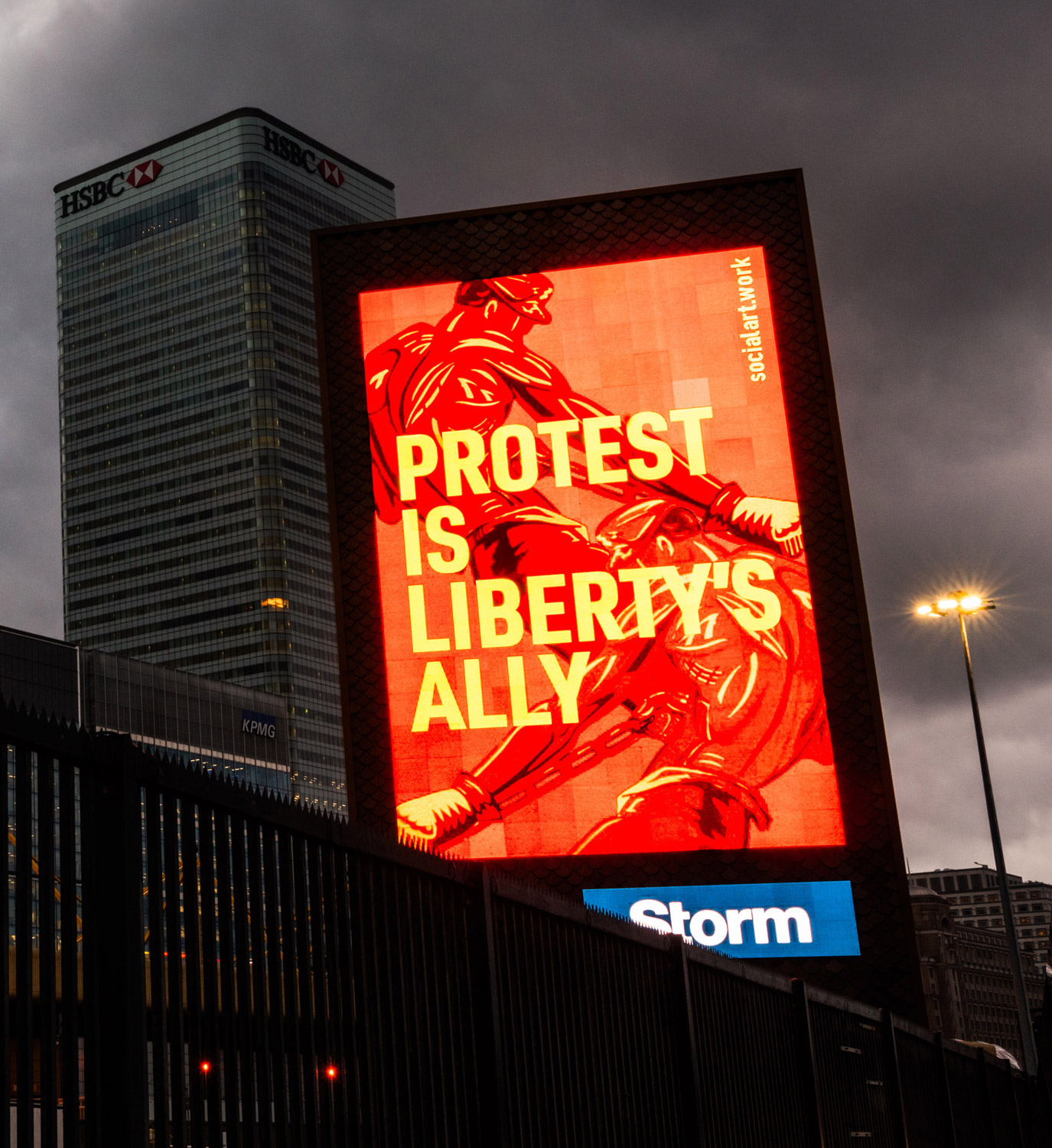
Protest art about the value of protest by Martin Firrell, UK, 2019

Free Speech Flag containing the AACS keys

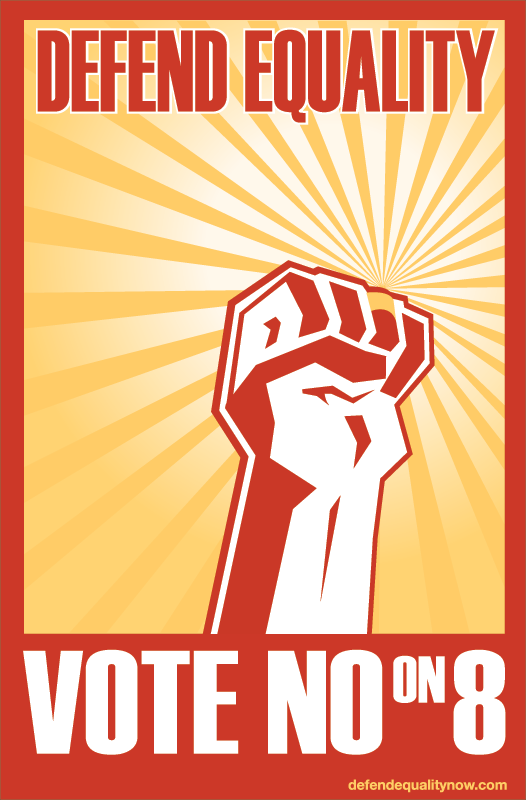
An example protesting California Proposition 8

Protest art is the creative works produced by activists and social movements. It is a traditional means of communication, utilized by a cross section of collectives and the state to inform and persuade citizens. Protest art helps arouse base emotions in their audiences, and in return may increase the climate of tension and create new opportunities to dissent. Since art, unlike other forms of dissent, takes few financial resources, less financially able groups and parties can rely more on performance art and street art as an affordable tactic.

Protest art acts as an important tool to form social consciousness, create networks, operate accessibly, and be cost-effective. Social movements produce works such as the signs, banners, posters, and other printed materials used to convey a particular cause or message. Often, such art is used as part of demonstrations or acts of civil disobedience. These works tend to be ephemeral, characterized by their portability and disposability, and are frequently not authored or owned by any one person. The various peace symbols, and the raised fist are two examples that highlight the democratic ownership of these signs.

Protest art also includes (but is not limited to) performance, site-specific installations, graffiti and street art, and crosses the boundaries of Visual arts genres, media, and disciplines. While some protest art is associated with trained and professional artists, an extensive knowledge of art is not required to take part in protest art. Protest artists frequently bypass the art-world institutions and commercial gallery system in an attempt to reach a wider audience. Protest art is not limited to one region or country, but is rather a method that is used around the world.

There are many politically charged pieces of fine art — such as Pablo Picasso's Guernica, some of Norman Carlberg's Vietnam War-era work, or Susan Crile's images of torture at Abu Ghraib.

== History ==
It is difficult to establish a history for protest art because many variations of it can be found throughout history. While many cases of protest art can be found during the early 1900s, like Picasso's Guernica in 1937, the 1960s and onwards have experienced a large increase in the number of artists adopting protest art as a style to relay a message to the public.

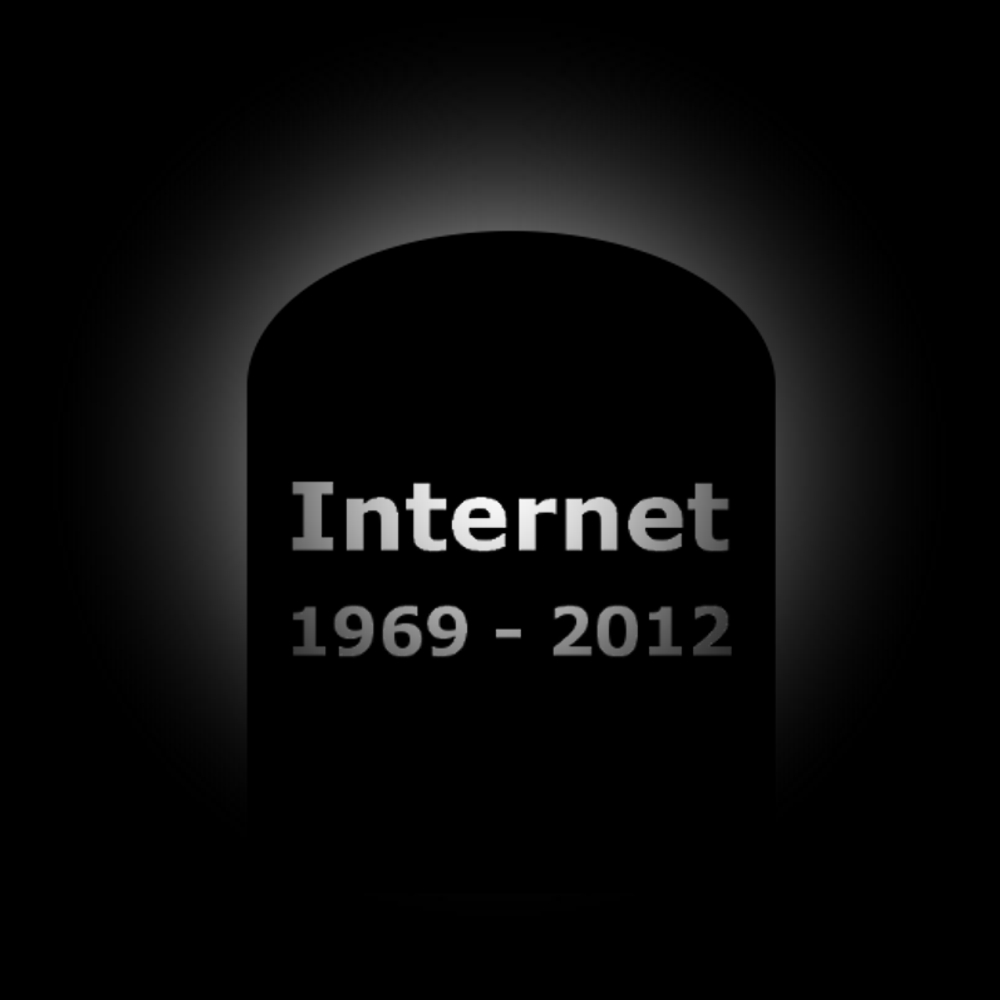
Protest art against SOPA

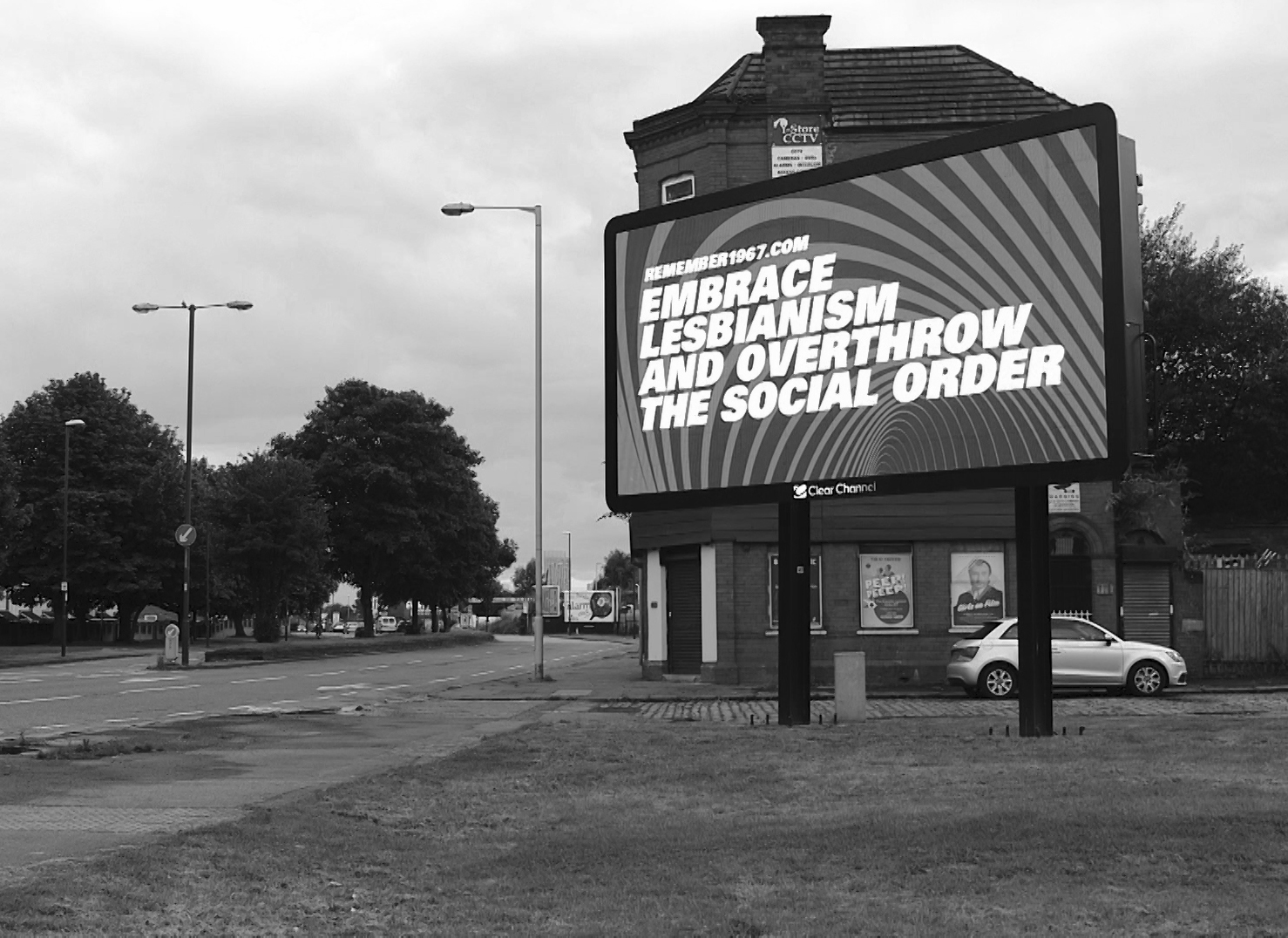
Digital billboard in Manchester UK displaying protest art by Martin Firrell

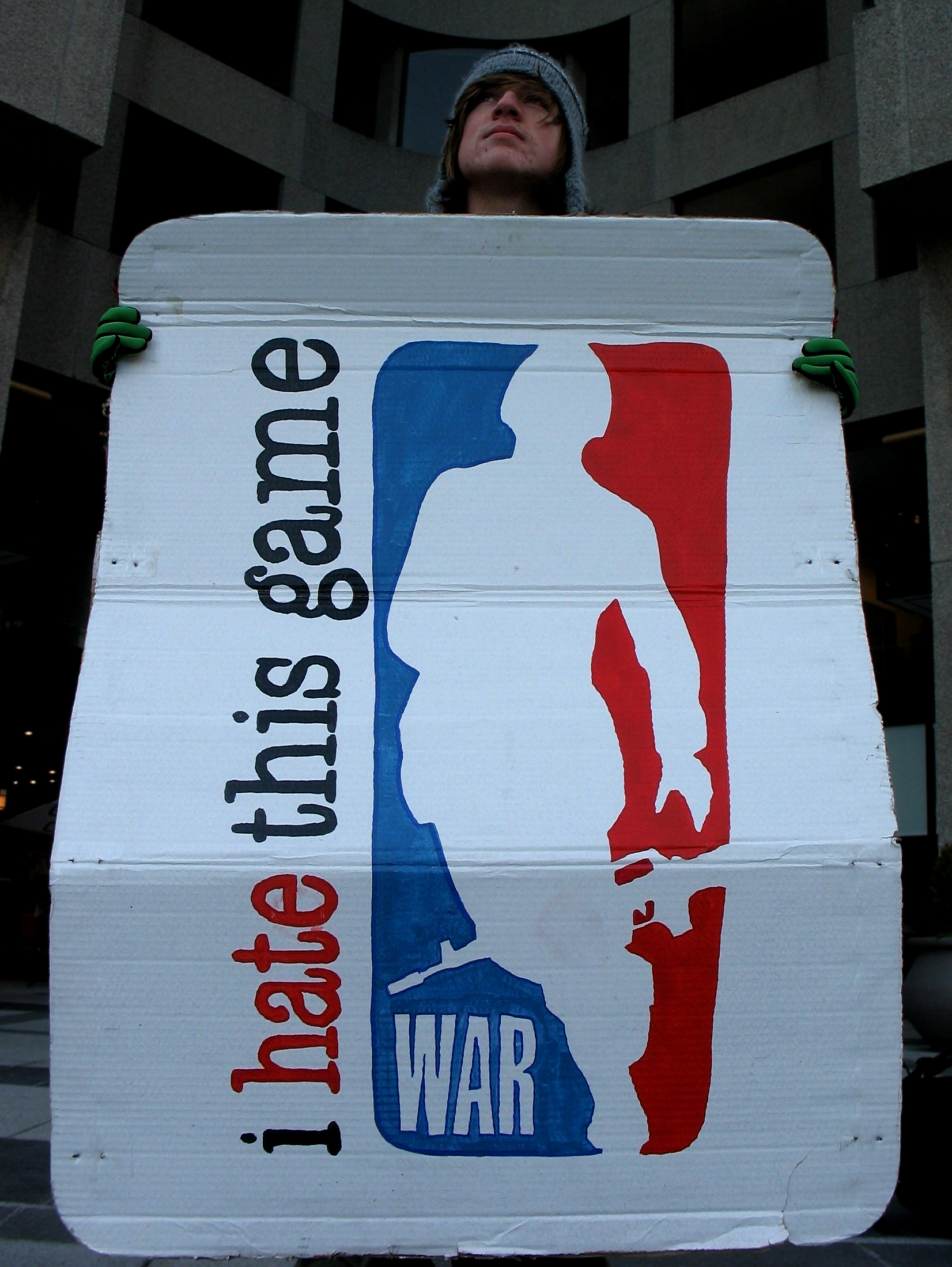
A piece of protest art featuring a parody of the logo of the NBA

As awareness of social justices around the world became more common among the public, an increase in protest art can be seen. Some of the most critically effective artworks of the 2000s were staged outside the gallery, away from the museum and in that sense, protest art has found a different relationship to the public.

== Activist art ==
Activist art represents and includes aesthetic, sociopolitical, and technological developments that have attempted to challenge and complicate the traditional boundaries and hierarchies of culture as represented by those in power. The aim of activist artists is to create art that is a form of political or social currency, actively addressing cultural power structures rather than representing them or simply describing them. Like protest art, activist art practice emerged partly out of a call for art to be connected to a wider audience, and to open up spaces where the marginalized and disenfranchised can be seen and heard. Activist artists are not always typical “artists”. Their works are individually created, and many of these individuals might not even consider themselves artists, but rather activists. An example of activist artwork by someone who doesn't consider themselves to be an artist is a “Protester with Damien Hirst sign during the first week of Occupy Wall Street, September 2011.” This is someone who is using someone else's artwork but then adding a message in text over the work to address a political or social issue. An example of activist art where someone considers themself an artist is the work “Art Workers’ Coalition, circa 1971 (photo Mehdi Khonsari)” where Mehdi's message is that artwork's being connected to capitalism, and how artists are influenced and catering to the financial elites of the world.

Activist art incorporates the use of public space to address socio-political issues and to encourage community and public participation as a means of bringing about social change. It aims to affect social change by engaging in active processes of representation that work to foster participation in dialogue, raise consciousness, and empower individuals and communities. The need to ensure the continued impact of a work by sustaining the public participation process it initiated is also a challenge for many activist artists. It often requires the artist to establish relationships within the communities where projects take place. Many active artists have been addressing the issue of climate change in their works, but this is just an example of one of many political artworks being created through activist art.

If social movements are understood as “repeated public displays” of alternative political and cultural values, then activist art is significant in articulating such alternative views. Activist art is also important to the dimension of culture and an understanding of its importance alongside political, economical, and social forces in movements and acts of social change. One should be wary of conflating activist art with political art, as doing so obscures critical differences in methodology, strategy, and activist goals. For example, in 2025, Kong Junyou, a student at Shanghai University, used a filmed five-day performance art project to protest intrusive elevator advertising. He shut down more than 100 advertising screens in residential buildings and published the action online, describing its purpose as provoking public discussion rather than destroying the equipment.

=== Historical basis in art and politics ===
Activist art cites its origins from a particular artistic and political climate. In the art world, performance art of the late 1960s to the 70s worked to broaden aesthetic boundaries within visual arts and traditional theatre, blurring the rigidly construed distinction between the two. Protest art involves creative works grounded in the act of addressing political or social issues. Protest art is a medium that is accessible to all socioeconomic classes and represents an innovative tool to expand opportunity structures. The transient, interdisciplinary, and hybrid nature of performance art allowed for audience engagement. The openness and immediacy of the medium invited public participation, and the nature of the artistic medium was a hub for media attention.

Emerging forms of feminism and feminist art of the time was particularly influential to activist art. The Feminist Art movement emerged in the early 60s during the second wave of feminism. Feminist artists worldwide set out to re-establish the founding pillars and reception of contemporary art. The movement inspired change, reshaped cultural attitudes and transformed gender stereotypes in the arts. The idea that “the personal is the political,” that is, the notion that personal revelation through art can be a political tool, guided much activist art in its study of the public dimensions to private experience. The strategies deployed by feminist artists parallel those by artists working in activist art. Such strategies often involved “collaboration, dialogue, a constant questioning of aesthetic and social assumptions, and a new respect for audience” and are used to articulate and negotiate issues of self-representation, empowerment, and community identity.

Conceptual Art sought to expand aesthetic boundaries in its critique of notions of the art object and the commodity system within which it is circulated as currency. Conceptual artists experimented with unconventional materials and processes of art production. Grounded by strategies rooted in the real world, projects in conceptual art demanded viewer participation and were exhibited outside of the traditional and exclusive space of the art gallery, thus making the work accessible to the public. Similarly, collaborative methods of execution and expertise drawn from outside the art world are often employed in activist art so as to attain its goals for community and public participation. Parallel to the emphasis on ideas that conceptual art endorsed, activist art is process-oriented, seeking to expose embedded power relationships through its process of creation.

In the political sphere, the militancy and identity politics of the period fostered the conditions out of which activist art arose.

=== Strategy and practice ===
In practice, activist art may often take the form of temporal interventions, such as performance, media events, exhibitions, and installations. It is also common to employ mainstream media techniques (through the use of billboards, posters, advertising, newspaper inserts…etc.). By making use of these commercial distributive channels of commerce, this technique is particularly effective in conveying messages that reveal and subvert its usual intentions.

The use of public participation as a strategy of activating individuals and communities to become a “catalyst for change” is important to activist art. In this context, participation becomes an act of self-expression or self-representation by the entire community. Creative expression empowers individuals by creating a space in which their voices can be heard and in which they can engage in a dialogue with one another, and with the issues in which they have a personal stake.

The Artist and Homeless Collaborative is an example of a project that works with strategies of public participation as a means of individual and community empowerment. It is an affiliation of artists, arts professionals and women, children and teenagers living in NYC shelters, the A & HC believe that their work in a collaborative project of art-making offers the residents a “positive experience of self-motivation and helps them regain what the shelter system and circumstances of lives destroy: a sense of individual identity and confidence in human interaction.” The process of engaging the community in a dialogue with dominant and public discourses about the issue of homelessness is described in a statement by its founder, Hope Sandrow: “The relevancy of art to a community is exhibited in artworks where the homeless speak directly to the public and in discussion that consider the relationship art has to their lives. The practice of creating art stimulates those living in shelters from a state of malaise to active participation in the artistic process”

The A & HC came into being at a time when a critique of the makers, sellers, and consumers of art that addressed social concerns became increasingly pronounced. Critics argued that the very works of art whose purpose was to provoke political, social and cultural conversation were confined within the exclusive and privileged space of galleries museums, and private collections. By contrast, the A & HC was an attempt to bridge the gap between art production and social action, thus allowing for the work subjects that were previously excluded and silenced to be heard.

== Resistance art ==
Resistance art is art used as a way of showing their opposition to powerholders. This includes art that opposed such powers as the German Nazi party, as well as that opposed to apartheid in South Africa. The Soweto uprising marked the beginning of social change in South Africa. Resistance art grew out of the Black Consciousness Movement, a grass-roots anti-Apartheid movement that emerged in the 1960s led by the charismatic activist Steve Biko. Much of the art was public, taking the form of murals, banners, posters, t-shirts and graffiti with political messages that were confrontational and focused on the realities of life in a segregated South Africa. Willie Bester is one of South Africa's most well known artists who originally began as a resistance artist. Using materials assembled from garbage, Bester builds up surfaces into relief and then paints the surface with oil paint. His works commented on important black South African figures and aspects important to his community. South African resistance artists do not exclusively deal with race nor do they have to be from the townships. Another artist, Jane Alexander, has dealt with the atrocities of apartheid from a white perspective. Her resistance art deals with the unhealthy society that continues in post-apartheid South Africa.

== Artivism ==
"Artivism" is a word coined in the 1990s by combining "activism" with art.

== Humanitarian satire art ==
"Humanitarian satire art" was a term introduced by author Lexa Brenner. This form of activist art uses seriocomedy, controversial images, and political statements. The works mock society and give the viewers the ability to interpret their works in many different ways. The majority of the works are built around the idea of promoting changes within society over current world issues. Works are usually left in hidden places, which citizens will eventually find. The majority of humanitarian satire artworks show political messages, most often alluding to controversial political messages, revolving around contemporary social issues.

== Collections ==
The Center for the Study of Political Graphics archive currently contains more than 85,000 posters and has the largest collection of post-World War II social justice posters in the United States and the second largest in the world. Many university libraries have extensive collections including the Joseph A. Labadie Collection at University of Michigan documents the history of social protest movements and marginalized political communities from the 19th century to the present.

== See also ==
- Anti-monumentalism
- Guerrilla Girls
- Object Orange
- Graffiti
- Prof. Abdul Rahim Nagori (socio-political painter)
- Anica Nonveiller
- Hans Burkhardt
- Martin Firrell
- Paweł Kuczyński
- Performers and Artists for Nuclear Disarmament
- Aestheticization of politics
- Mattress Performance (Carry That Weight)
- Australian poster collectives
