= Krzysztof Olszewski =

Krzysztof Olszewski (born 11 June 1970, in Kartuzy, Poland), who exhibits work as KED, is a Polish photographer and visual and installation artist.

He studied photography at the Academy of Fine Arts in Poznań, (Poland) in The Department of Multimedia Communication. His master's degree was supervised by Grzegorz Przyborek. He later took a Post-Master's Certificate Course in Film Direction in the National Film, Television and Theatre School in Łódz (Poland).

He has been awarded artistic scholarships by the City of Szczecin (2004, 2005), Academy of Fine Arts in Poznań (2004) and The National Film, Television and Theatre School, Łódz (2005).

He is a lecturer in the Top Art School in Szczecin (Poland). He is also the Photo Editor of the philosophical quarterly "fo-pa". He is the founder and current director of the National Visual Arts Festival inSPIRACJE in Szczecin (Poland). His photographic work has been widely published in magazines across Europe including "Foto Pozytyw", "Fotopolis", "Biuletyn Fotograficzny" (Poland); "Photo" (France); "Image" (Slovakia) and in journals such as "Tygiel Kultury" and philosophical in "fo - pa".

== Exhibitions ==
- Exhibition and Unwanted Furniture, Modern Art Museum in National Museum Szczecin, Poland 2007
- Memorials of Nature, Town Hall Gallery, Bad Freienwalde, Germany, 2007
- Memorials of Nature, III International Visual Arts Festival in Szczecin, 13 Muses, Szczecin, Poland 2007
- made In Poland, V International Photography Festival in Łódz, Arts Nova Gallery, Łódz, Poland 2006.
- made In Poland II International Art Photography Festival in Szczecin, Gothic Gallery, The Pomeranian Dukes’ Castel, Szczecin, Poland, 2006
- Special Case, CSW InnerSpace, Poznań, Poland, 2005
- Imaginary Spac and Toy skies, Toy Views and Tiny Secrets, Pyramid Gallery Książnica Pomorska in Szczecin, Poland 2005
- Special Case, Place of Art OFFicyna in Szczecin, Poland, 2005
- Galleries automatique - international action, Szczecin-Strasburg-Berlin 2005
- Project 33-22, The Gate Jazz Cafe, Szczecin, Poland 2005
- When Angels are Falling, Gallery PaCamera in Suwałki, Poland 2005
- Imaginary Space, III International Photography Festival in Łódz, Four Cultures Dialogue Gallery, Łódz, Poland 2004
- Imaginary Space, IX International photography Festival in Poprad, Slovakia 2004
- Imaginary Space, Polish Theatr Gallery, Nation of Yourself in Poznań, Poland 2004
- When Angels are Falling, International Pictures Fairs "Polfoto", Międzyzdroje, Poland 2003
