= Karel Anthierens =

Belgian journalist (1935–2022)

- Born: 22 October 1935; Machelen, Belgium
- Died: 15 December 2022 (aged 87); Sint-Genesius-Rode, Belgium
- Occupation: Journalist

Karel Anthierens (22 October 1935 – 15 December 2022) was a Belgian journalist. He worked for 17 newspapers and magazines during his 40-year career. It is stated that no other Flemish journalist has worked for so many different newspapers, magazines and television channels.

== Biography ==
Anthierens had 11 brothers and sisters. His brothers Johan Anthierens and Jef Anthierens were also well-known journalists.

Anthierens started working as an editor at De Periscoop in 1957. After that he worked for various Flemish magazines, he worked three years later at the weekly magazine HUMO, where his brother was the editor-in-chief. Anthierens would later become the editor-in-chief until 1969. Anthierens then worked for other newspapers and magazine including Het Laatste Nieuws, Knack and Panorama. For Panorama he was for ten years the editor-in-chief.

Anthierens had a wife, two sons and grandchildren. He died in Sint-Genesius-Rode on 15 December 2022, at the age of 87.
