= University of Fine Arts, Poznań =

Art school in Poznań, Poland

Coordinates: 52°24′36″N 16°55′44″E

Magdalena Abakanowicz University of Fine Arts
- Uniwersytet Artystyczny im. Magdaleny Abakanowicz w Poznaniu
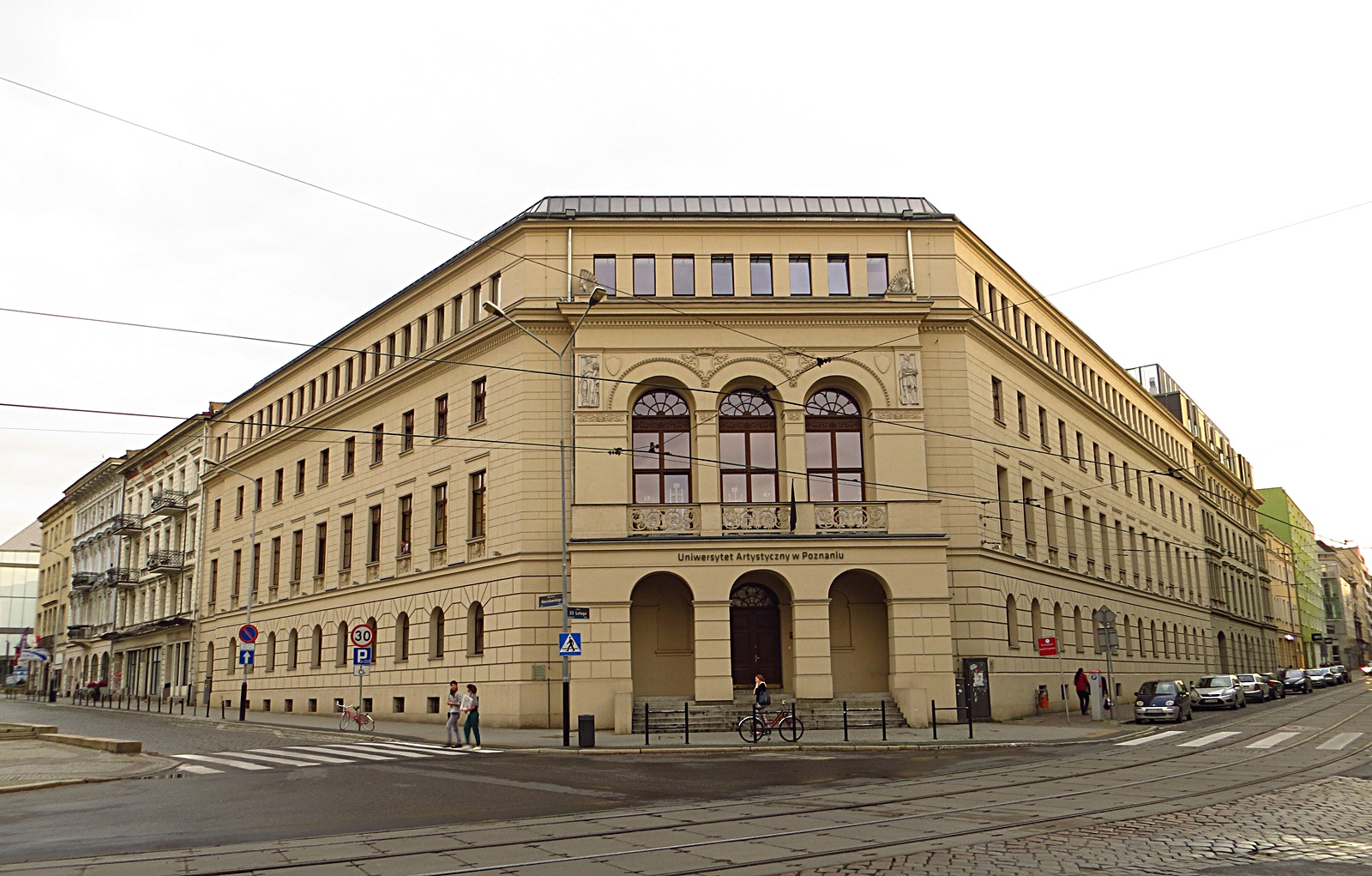
- Main building, in Al. Marcinkowskiego, Poznań
- Type: Public
- Established: 1919
- Rector: prof. Maciej Kurak
- Location: Al. Marcinkowskiego 29; 60-967 Poznań, Poznań, Greater Poland Voivodeship, Poland
- Campus: Urban
- Website: https://uap.edu.pl/

Magdalena Abakanowicz University of Fine Arts (Polish: Uniwersytet Artystyczny im. Magdaleny Abakanowicz) is a major fine-art academy located in the city of Poznań, in west-central Poland. It was founded in 1919 as the State School of Decorative Arts (Pol. Państwowa Szkoła Sztuki Zdobniczej).

== History ==
=== 1919–1938: State School of Decorative Arts ===
Following many efforts raised during the partitions of Poland, on November 1, 1919, the State School of Decorative Arts (Państwowa Szkoła Sztuk Zdobnicznych) was opened in Poznań. In 1921, the school was put under state government and started operating under the name of the State School of Decorative Arts and the Art Industry. During the years 1919–1925 the educational program implemented related primarily to crafts, art industry and painting. A new Department of Interior Design was opened in the academic year 1927/28. By 1927 there were six faculties within the School: Department of Decorative Painting and Design, Department of Graphics and Bookbinding, Department of Ceramics, Faculty of Metal Sculpture, Bronzing and Jewellery, Department of Textiles and the Department of Interior Design. In 1929, the staff and students of the Poznań took part in the Universal National Exhibition (Pol. Powszechna Wystawa Krajowa), presenting their works in the Art Department, as well as in other exhibition spaces of the UNE.

=== 1938–1939: State Institute of Fine Arts ===
On June 1, 1937, the State School of Decorative Arts and the Art Industry was renamed the State Institute of Fine Arts. The institute's education lasted five years and was divided into one-year courses at the General Department and special departments – the academic year in each department began on September 10 and ended on June 20. In these years, the Institute employed a total of 40 employees, 23 teachers and instructors, 12 supplementary teachers and 4 members of administrative staff, while the students were divided into ordinary and extraordinary, depending on their previous education. As a part of the institute's activities, a public drawing room was opened with a drawing course. The main task of the institute was "artistic and technical preparation of employees of the artistic industry and handicrafts for independent creative work in various branches of the field".

=== 1946–1996: State High School of Fine Arts ===
After World War II, the institute was transformed into the State High School of Fine Arts with the departments of Painting and Graphics as well as Interior Art and Sculpture. In the 1950s, because of the restrictions of the authorities, painting, graphics and weaving were abolished and replaced with furniture making and interior design, which became the main disciplines taught at School. After the Khrushchev Thaw, the school moved to the building of Sądownictwo Krajowe, which now belongs to the University of Arts complex. A number of art galleries closely related to the university were opened and were active throughout the 1980s and 1990s.

=== 1996–present ===
In 1996, the School obtained the status of the Academy of Fine Arts, and in 2010 the status of the University of Arts.

In 2013 the revitalization of the main building was completed, restoring the previous facade colour and architectural details, such as ornaments and sculptures.

In 2016, a new didactic building was opened, housing working spaces for students, television and film studios, a paintshop, a printing house and an exhibition space in the lobby. The lobby was equipped with the so-called acoustic shower.

Since October 2016, five university galleries have opened: Duża Scena UAP, Mała Scena UAP, Galeria CURATORS 'Lab, Galeria Design and Galeria R20. The exhibitions organised in the university galleries primarily show the works of students, graduates and staff of the university and are a place for various workshops for adults and children.

== Faculties ==
- Faculty of Animation and Intermedia
- Faculty of Architecture and Design
- Faculty of Interior and Stage Design
- Faculty of Art Education and Curatorial Studies
- Faculty of Graphic Arts
- Faculty of Graphic Design
- Faculty of Photography
- Faculty of Painting and Drawing
- Faculty of Image and Interdisciplinary Practices
- Faculty of Sculpture

== Artists associated with the University ==
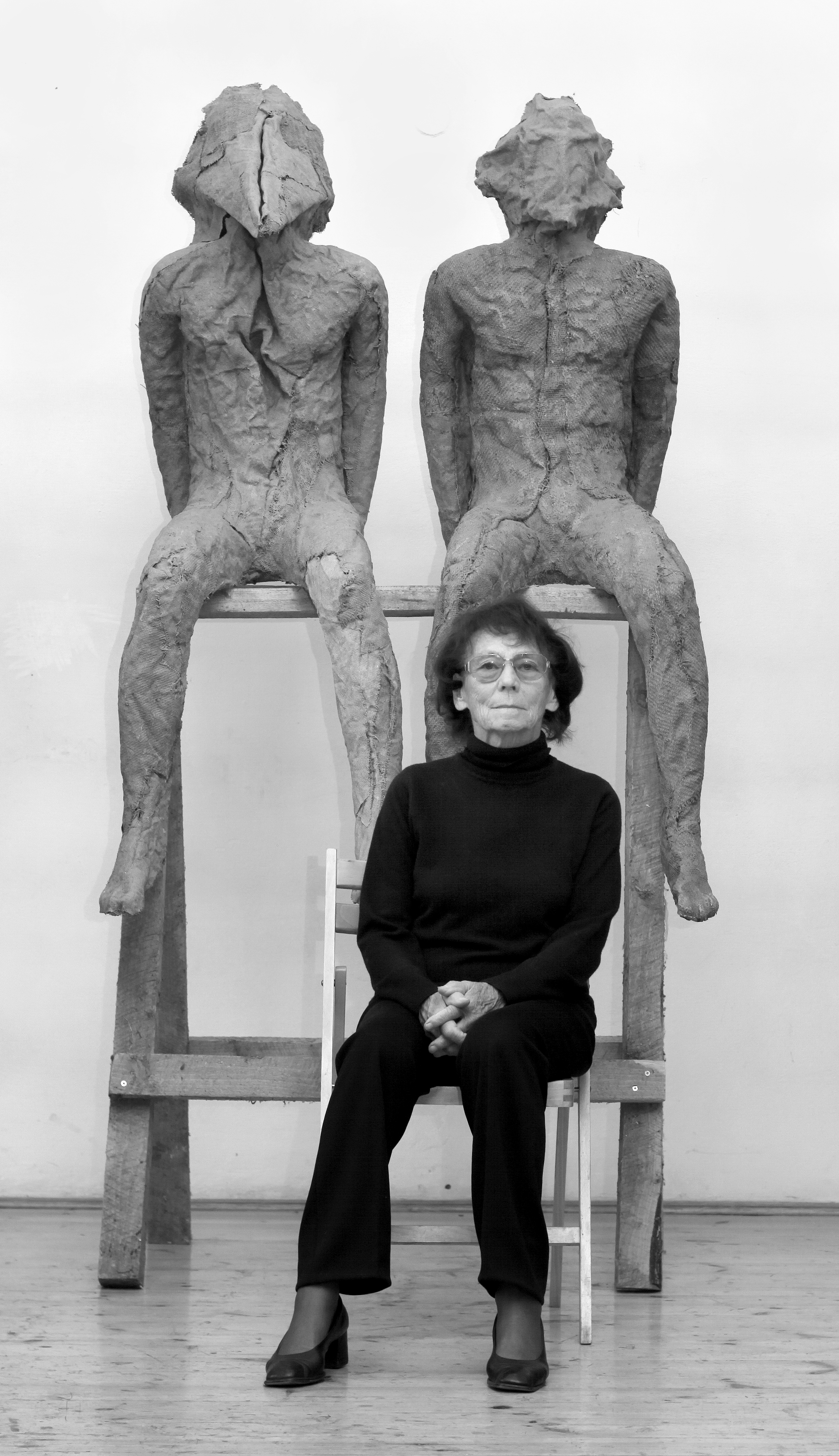
Magdalena Abakanowicz

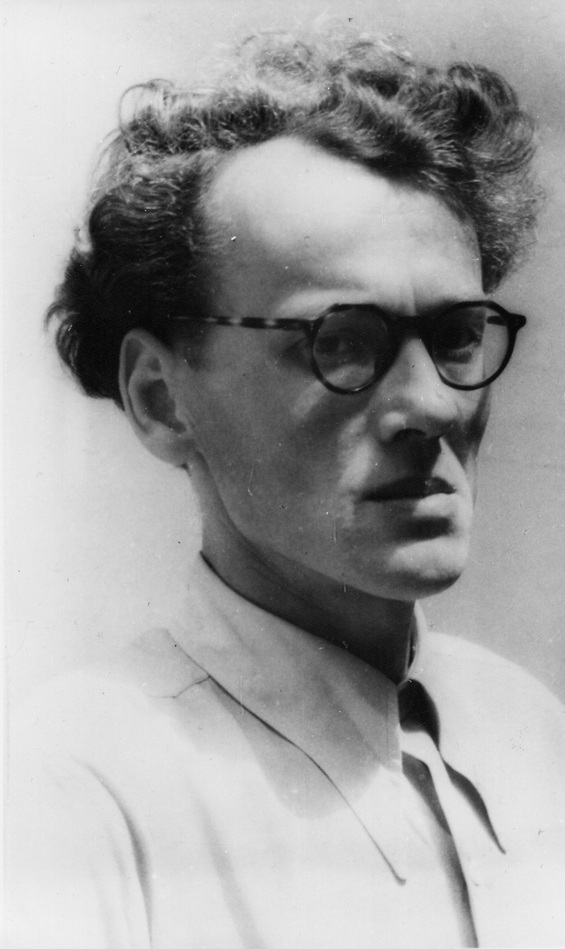
Józef Gosławski

- Magdalena Abakanowicz
- Agnieszka Balewska
- Jan Berdyszak
- Kiejstut Bereźnicki
- Józef Czerniawski
- Zdzisław Eichler
- Wiktor Gosieniecki
- Wanda Gosławska
- Józef Gosławski
- Izabella Gustowska
- Joanna Hoffmann-Dietrich
- Rafał Jakubowicz
- Przemysław Jasielski
- Bogumiła Jung
- Zbigniew Kaja
- Józef Kopczyński
- Małgorzata Kopczyńska-Matusewicz
- Pawel Kuczynski
- Krzysztof Olszewski
- Urszula Plewka-Schmidt
- Marcin Rożek
- Monika Sosnowska
- Waldemar Świerzy
- Piotr Szyhalski
- Bazyli Wojtowicz
- Jan Jerzy Wroniecki
