= Agnieszka Balewska =

Polish painter

- Born: 1967 (age 58–59); Poznań, Poland
- Known for: Painting, performance art, drawing, graphic design

Agnieszka Balewska is a Polish painter born in 1967, who lives in Poznań.

== Career ==
She graduated from the Academy of Fine Arts in Poznań in 1993. In 2002 she received a PhD degree from the Adam Mickiewicz University. Her PhD thesis Metonimia i metafora wobec artystycznego fenomenu sztuki obiektu (Metonymy and metaphor in relation to the phenomenon of object art) was published in Paris in 2005.

Her artistic activity is focused on painting, performance art, drawing, graphic design, and since 1992 also on art criticism. In 2000-2006 she was one of the editors of the journal Arteon published in Poznań. She wrote several books, and numerous articles in periodicals published in Poland and abroad. She also lectured at the Adam Mickiewicz University and Academy of Fine Arts in Poznań.

She has exhibited in Poland and internationally since 1993, e.g. in Poznań, Warsaw, Łódź, Kraków, Szczecin, Gdańsk, Frankfurt (Oder), Bonn, Hannover, London, Nottingham, Tokyo.

Since 1994 she has her own Verbal Gallery "DUCK-TAK" in Poznań and edits its annual archives. She also created the Lagunart group composed of 12 artists.

== Selected solo exhibits ==
- 1993 - International Art Centre, Poznań, Poland;
- 1994 - ABC Gallery, Poznań, Poland;
- 1994 - Teraz Gallery, Szczecin, Poland;
- 1995 - Pod Lipami Gallery, Poznań, Poland;
- 1995 - B Gallery, Frankfurt (Oder), Germany;
- 1996 - Teraz Gallery, Szczecin, Poland;
- 1996 - ON Gallery, Poznań, Poland;
- 1997 - performance - Puszczykowo, Poland;
- 1997 - ABC Gallery, Poznań, Poland;
- 1998 - Pod Lipami Gallery, Poznań, Poland;
- 1998 - performance - QQ Gallery, Kraków, Poland;
- 1999 - Gallery of PKO BP, Poznań, Poland;
- 2000 - BWA Gallery, Słupsk + Ustka, Poland;
- 2000 - Pod Lipami Gallery, Poznań, Poland;
- 2001 - performance, C.K.Zamek, Poznań, Poland;
- 2001 - Inny Śląsk Gallery, Tarnowskie Góry, Poland;
- 2001 - University of Tokyo, Japan;
- 2002 - ABC Gallery, Poznań, Poland;
- 2002 - Makuhari, Tokyo, Japan;
- 2003 - Polony Gallery, Poznań, Poland;
- 2004 - PBG Gallery, Poznań, Poland;
- 2004 - ZPAP Gallery, Poznań, Poland;
- 2005 - performance Pod Lipami Gallery, Poznań, Poland;
- 2006 - Naprzeciw Gallery, Poznań, Poland;
- 2008 - Arsenał Municipal Gallery, Poznań, Poland
- 2024 - Arsenał Municipal Gallery, Poznań, Poland ("THE CROSSROADS OF LAGUNART artists" from the Lagunart group led by her)

== Selected works ==
=== Paintings from an exhibition in Arsenal Municipal Gallery in Poznań in 2024 ===
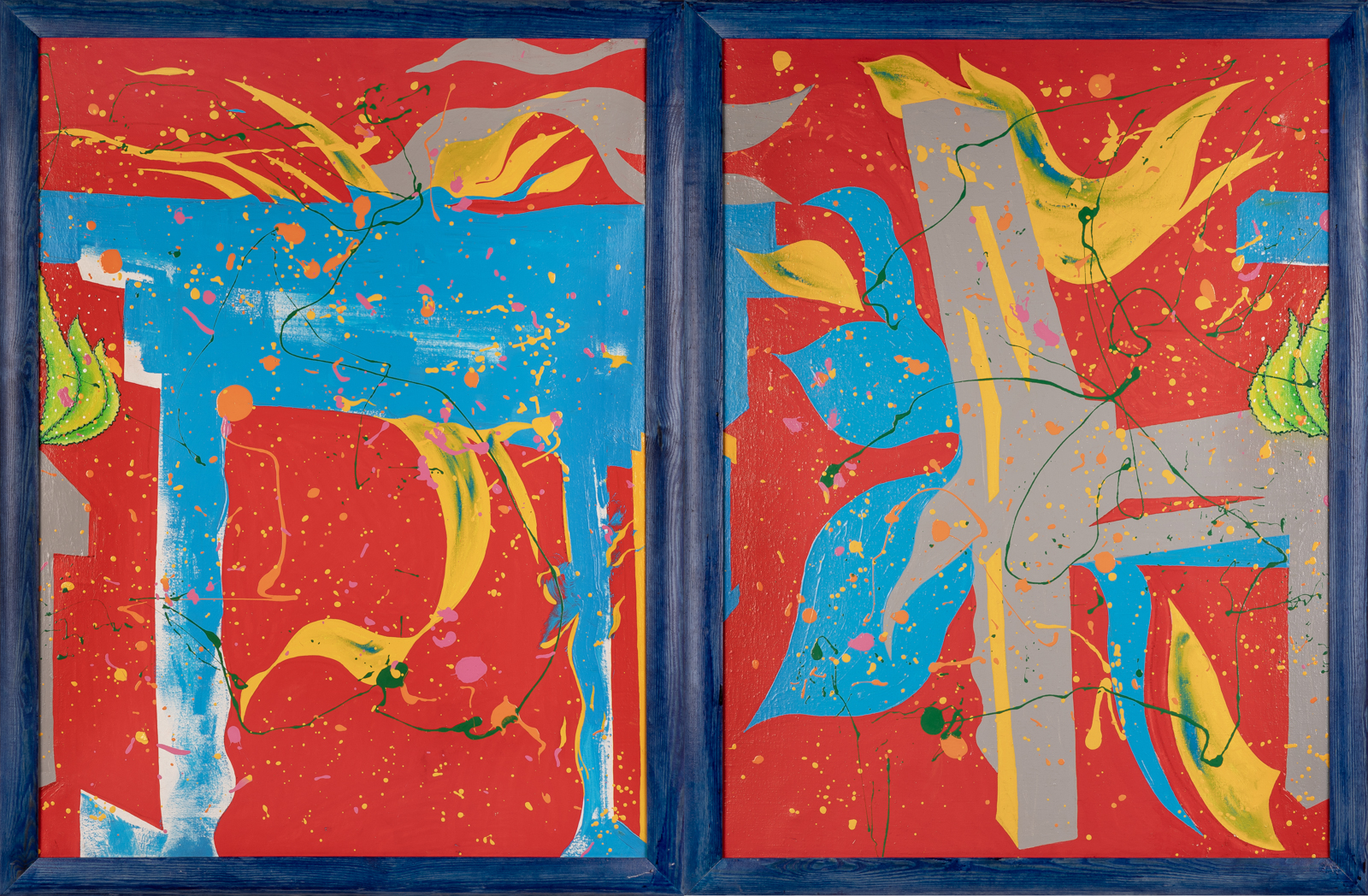
Affirmation AB

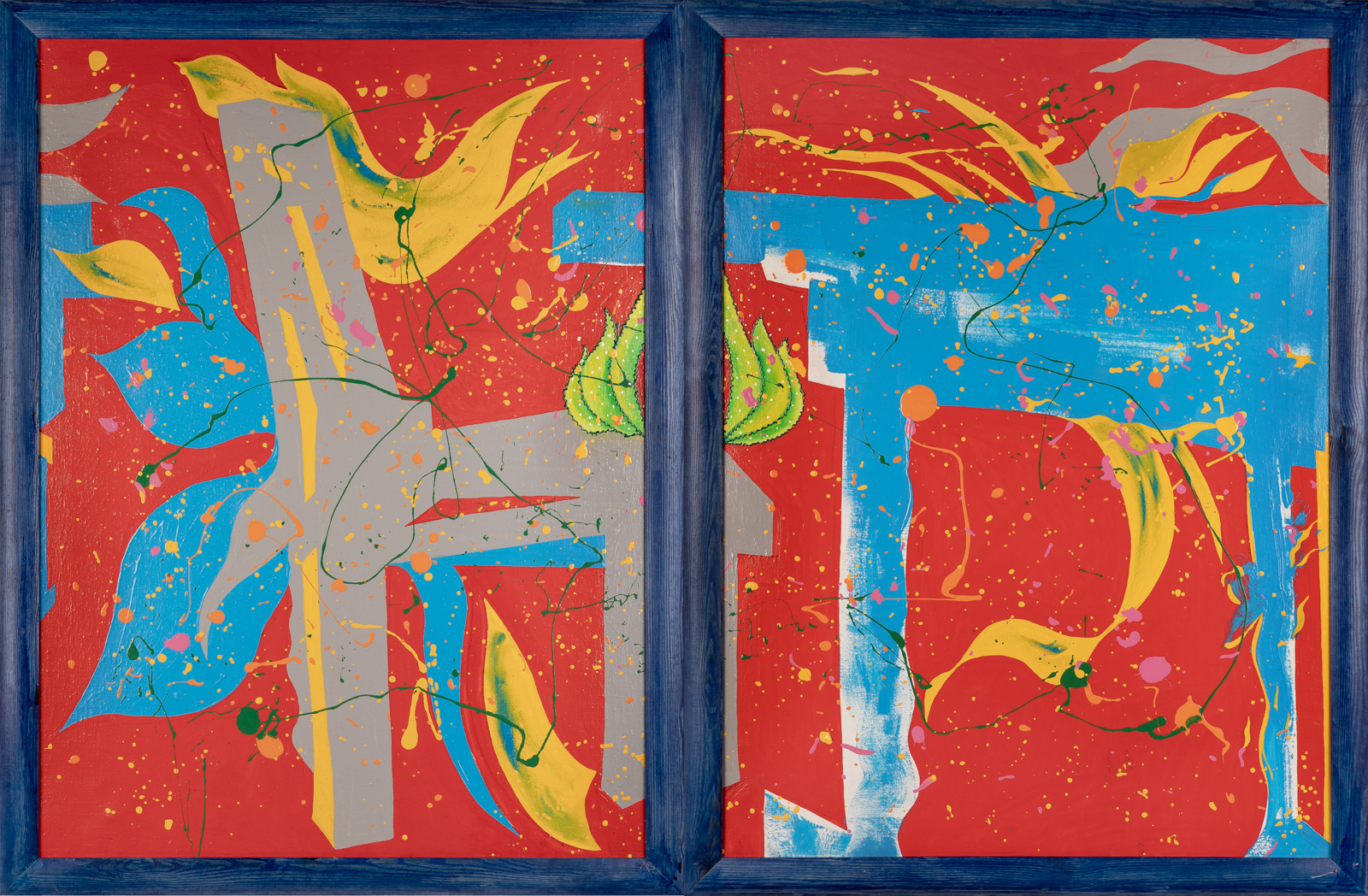
Affirmation BA

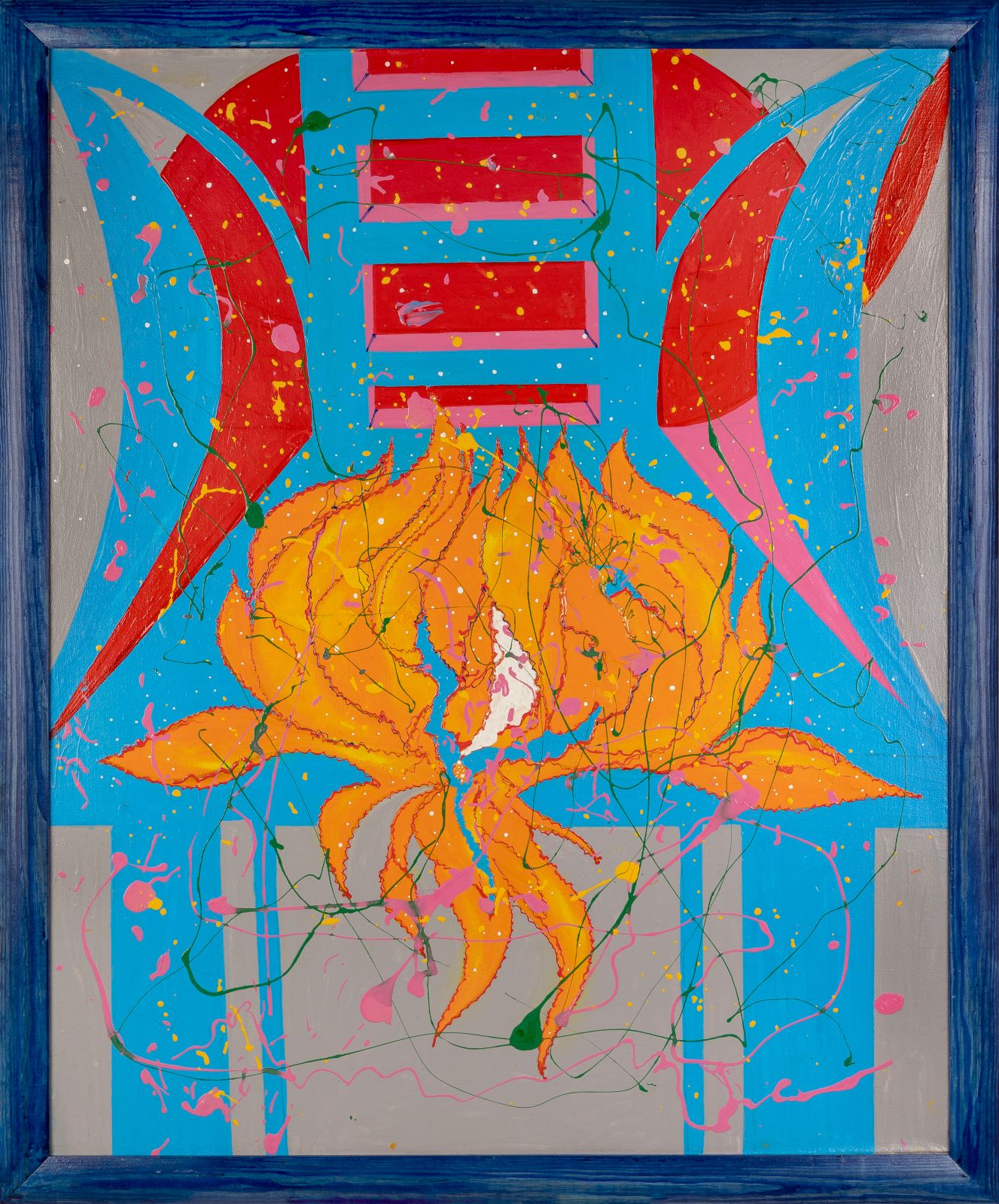
Meditation

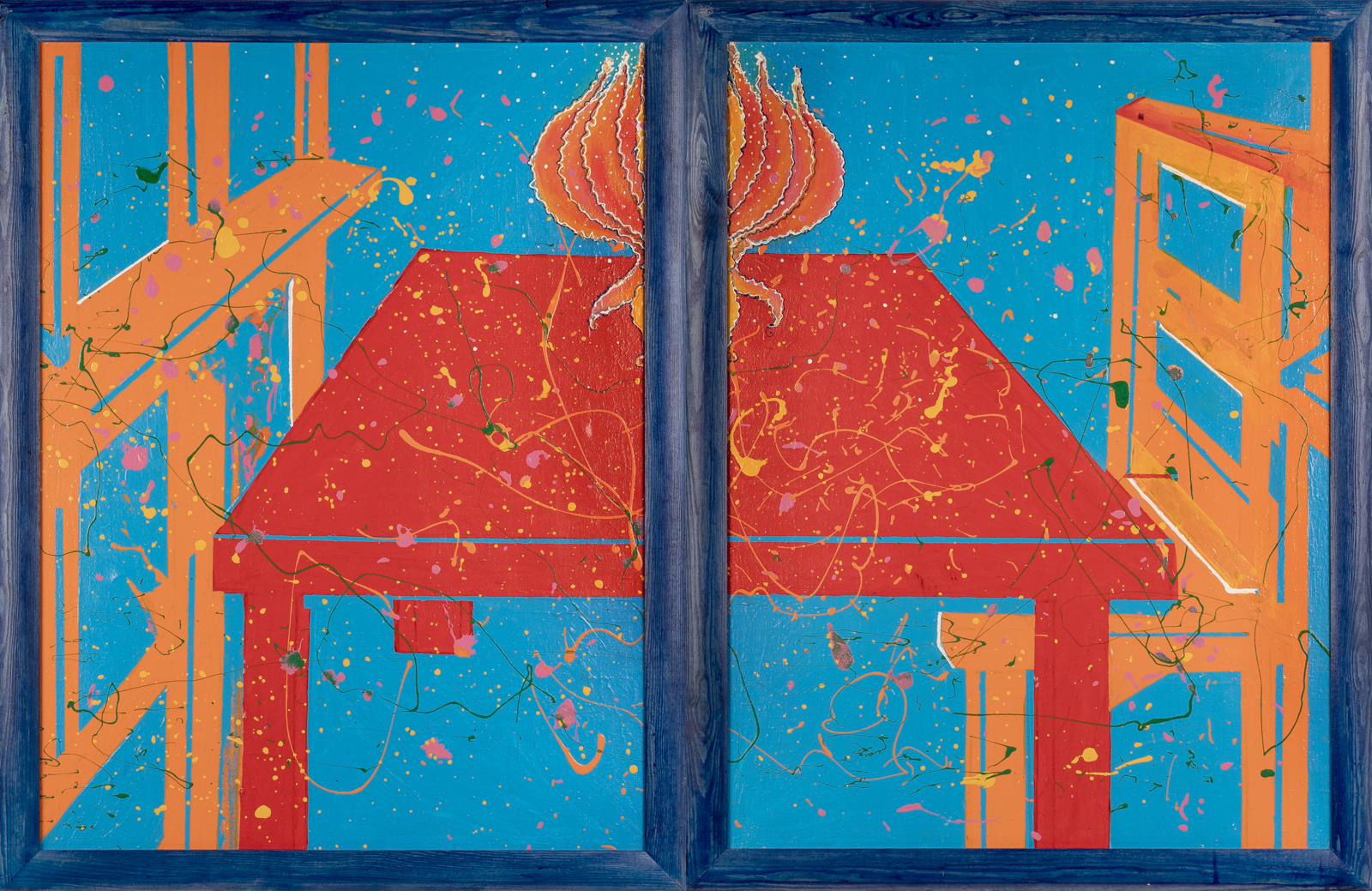
Contemplation AB

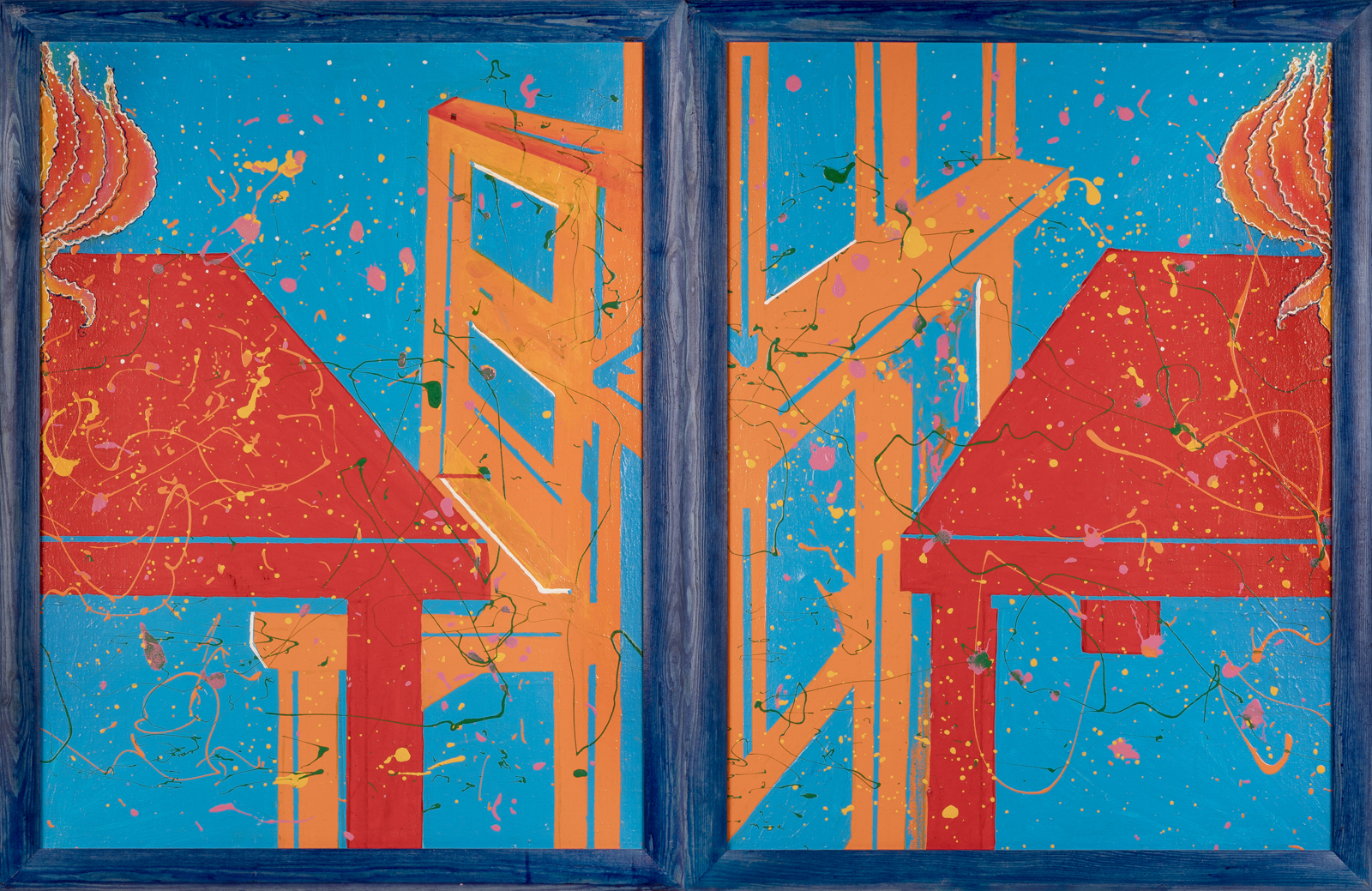
Contemplation BA

=== Paintings from an exhibition in Poznań in 2025 ===
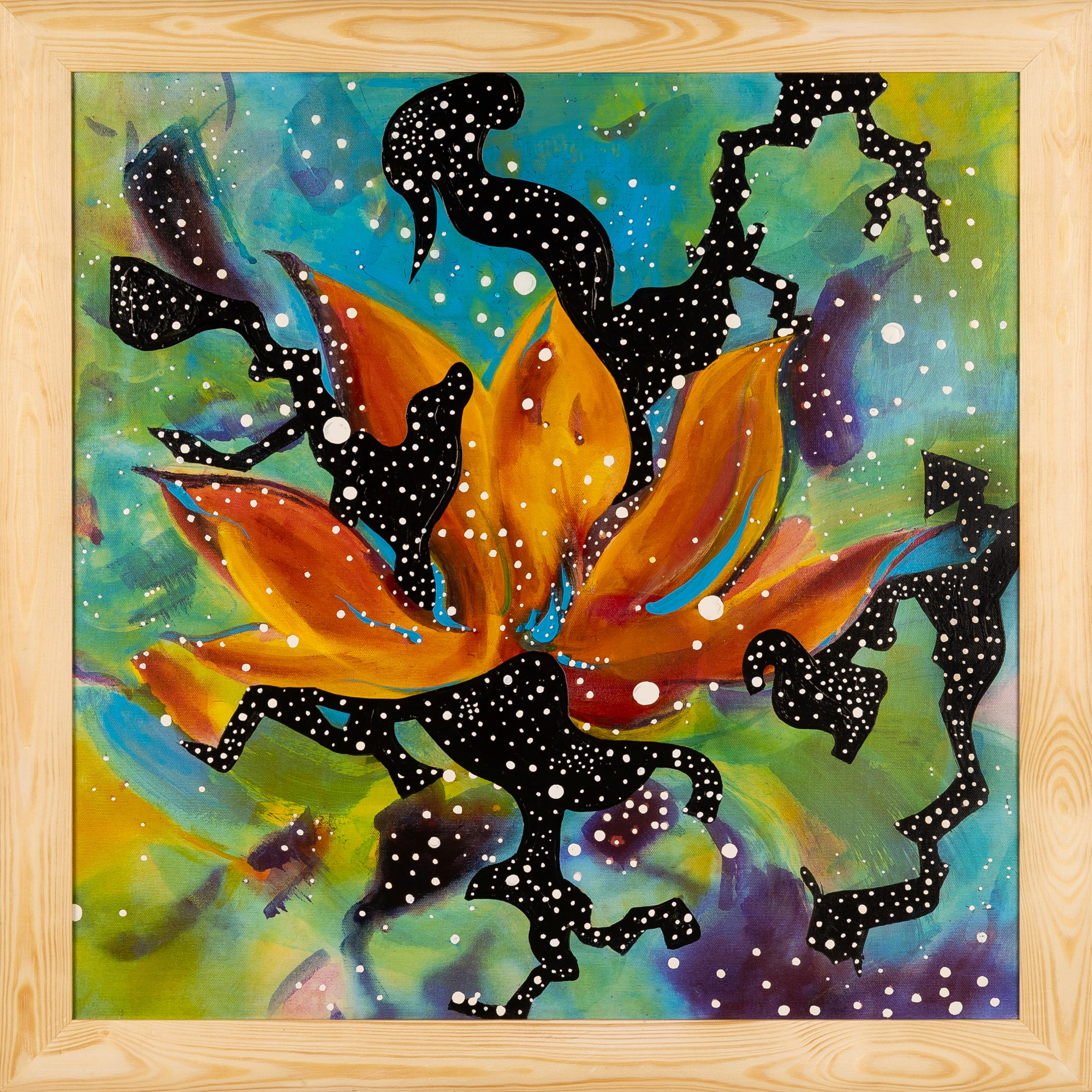
Lily 1

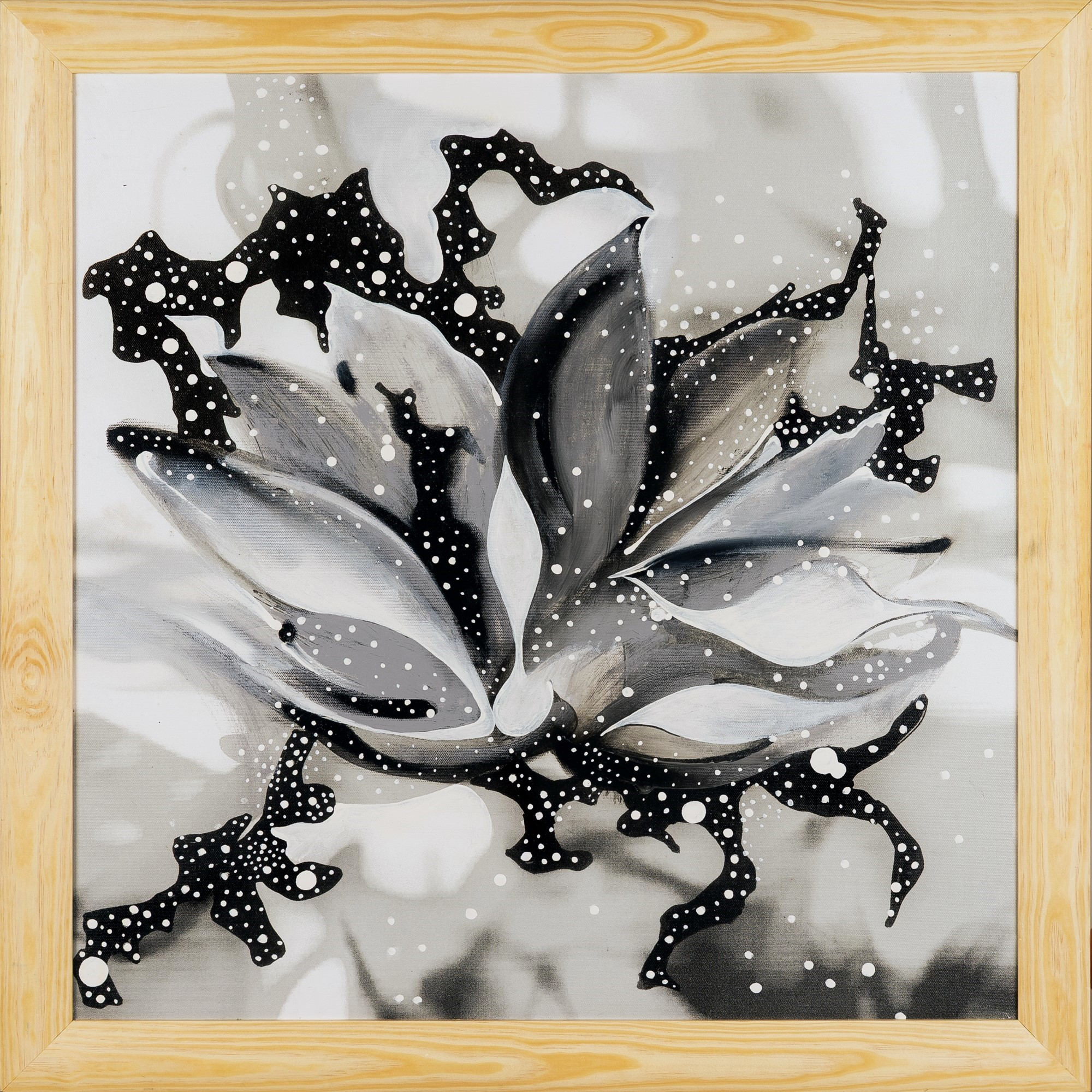
Lily 2

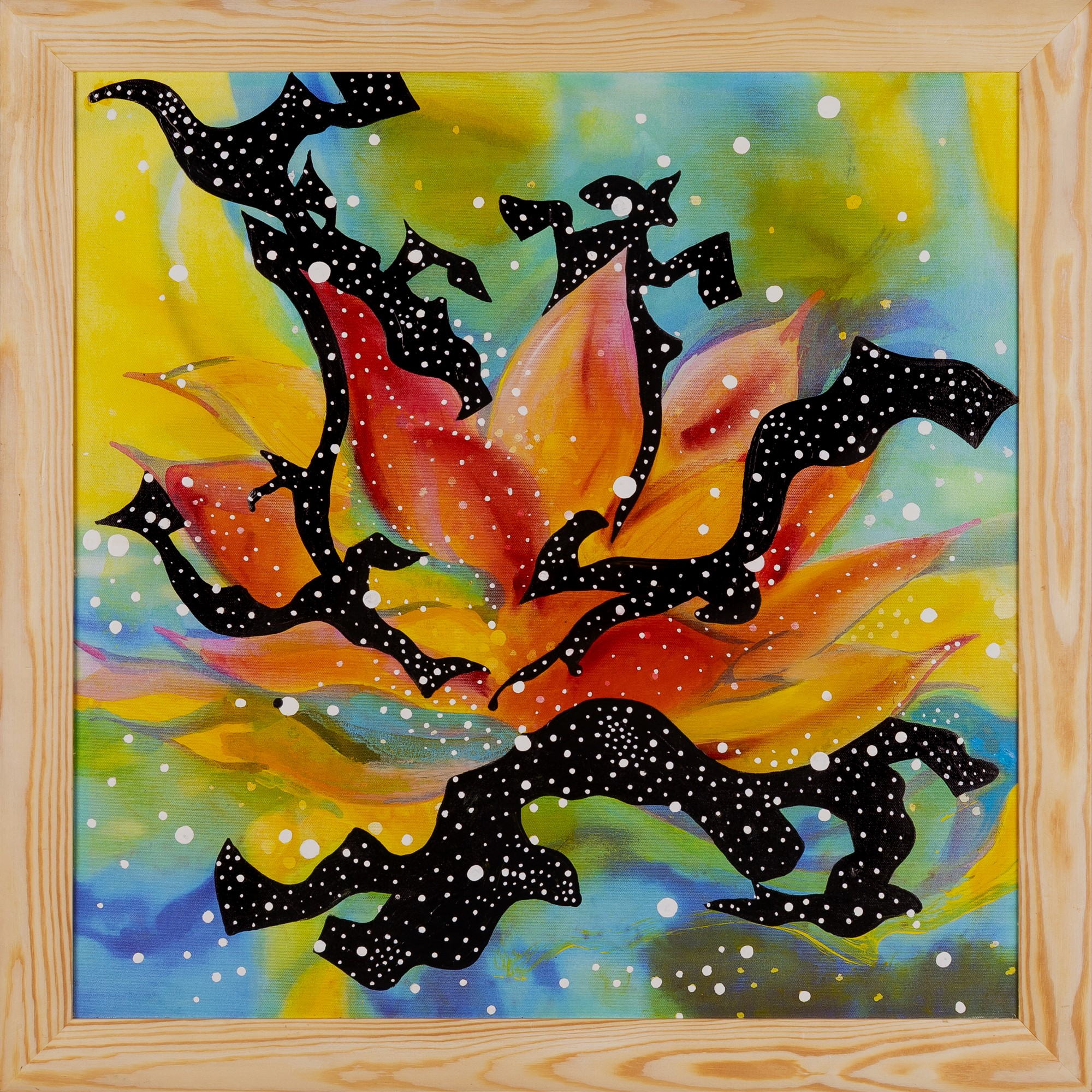
Lily 3

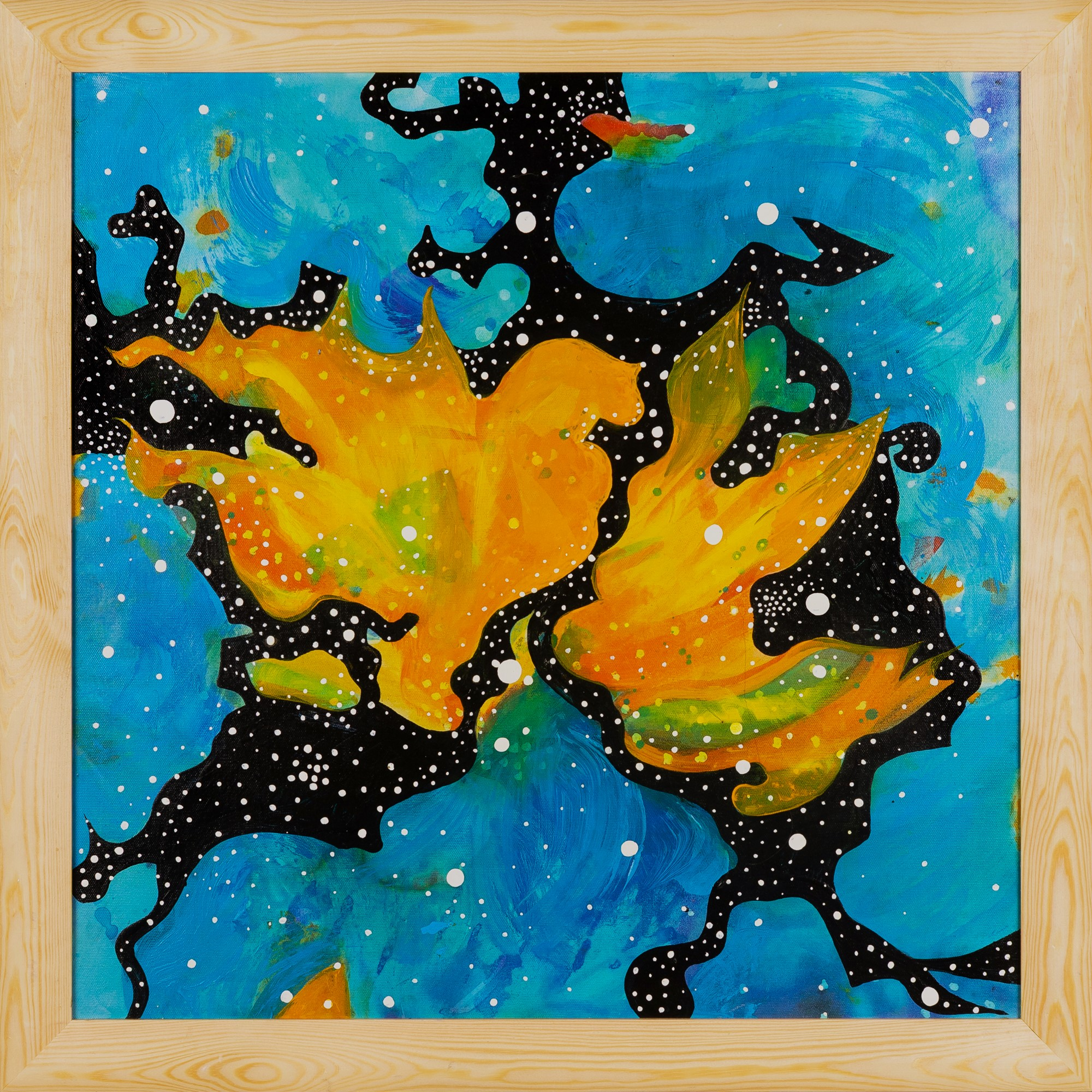
Lily 4

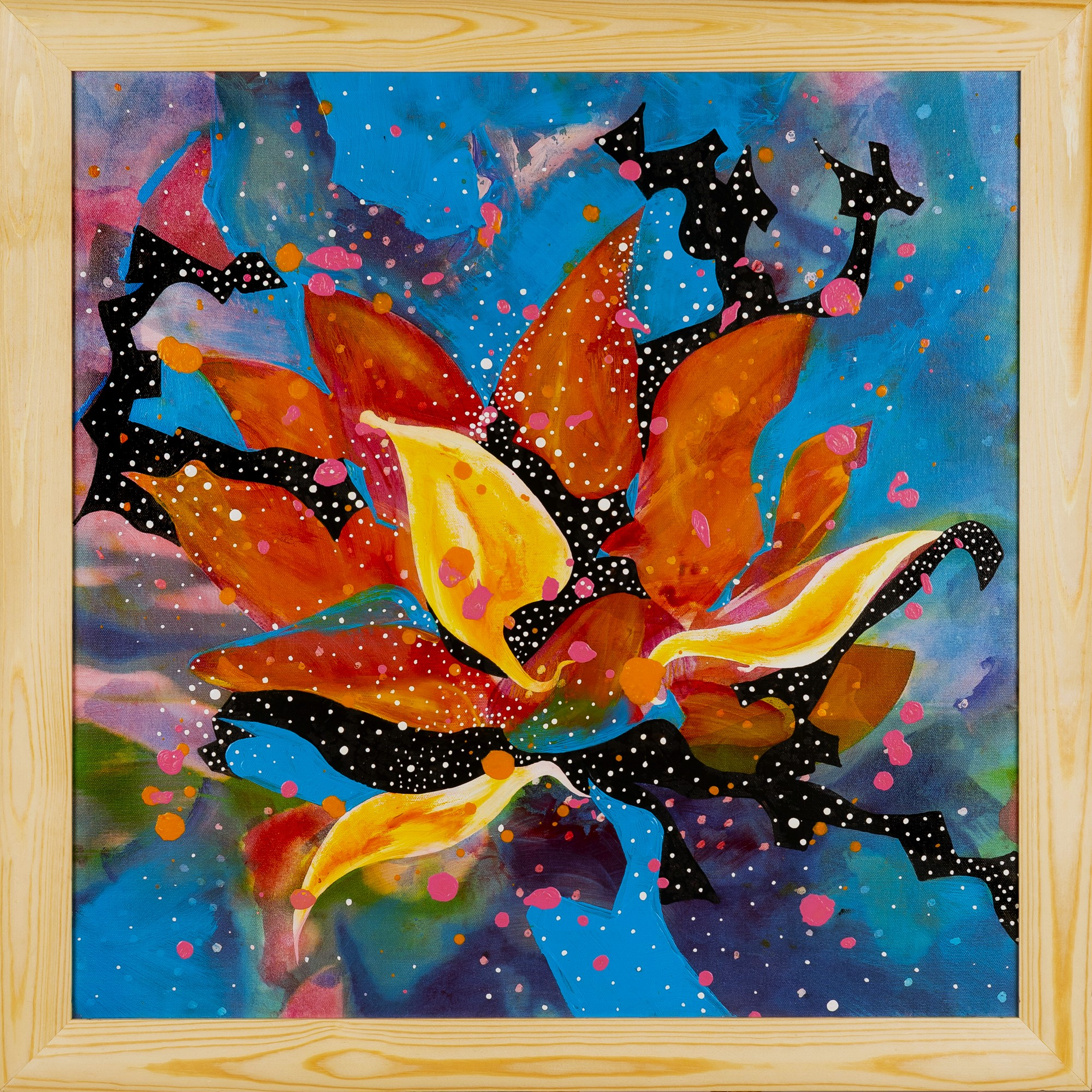
Lily 5

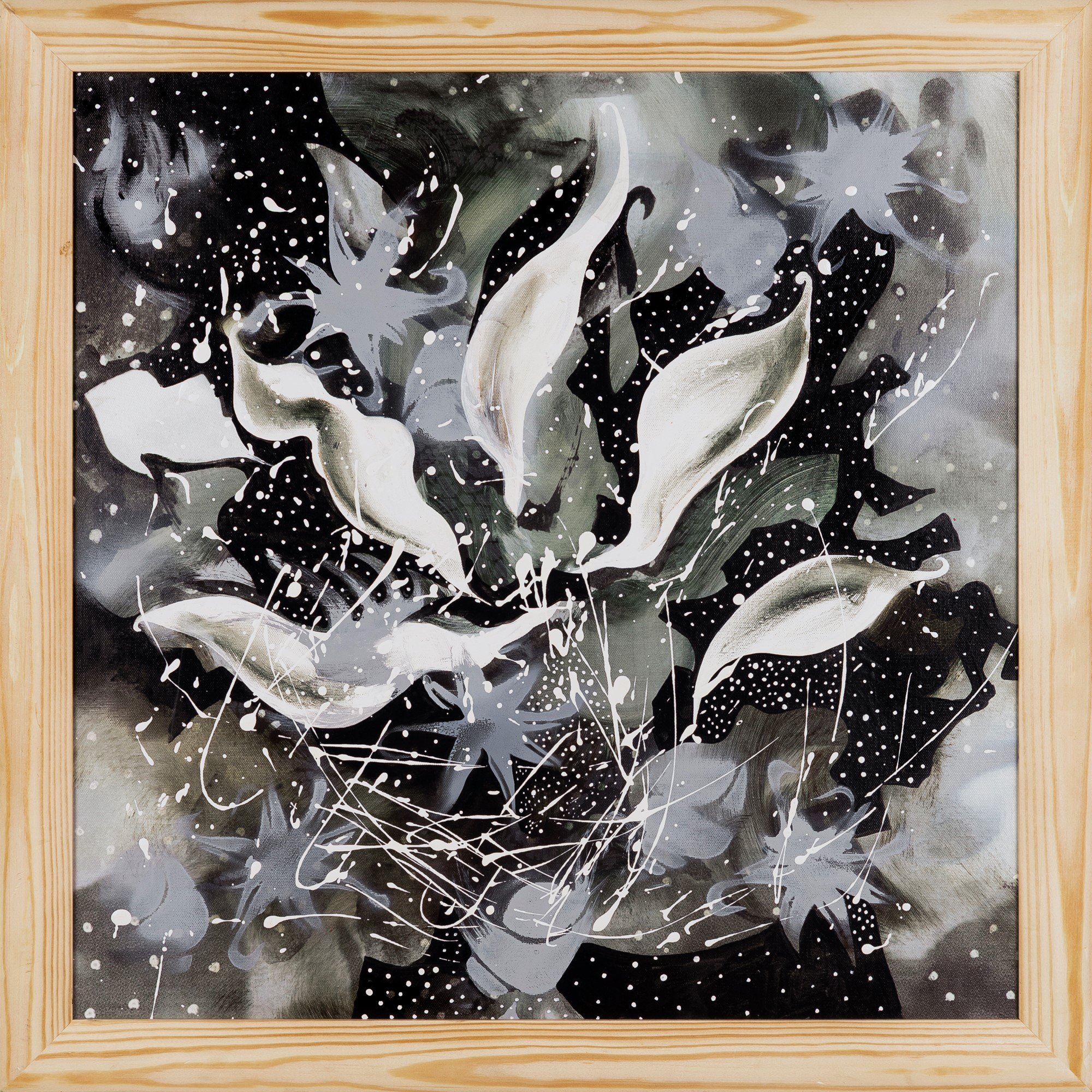
Lily 6

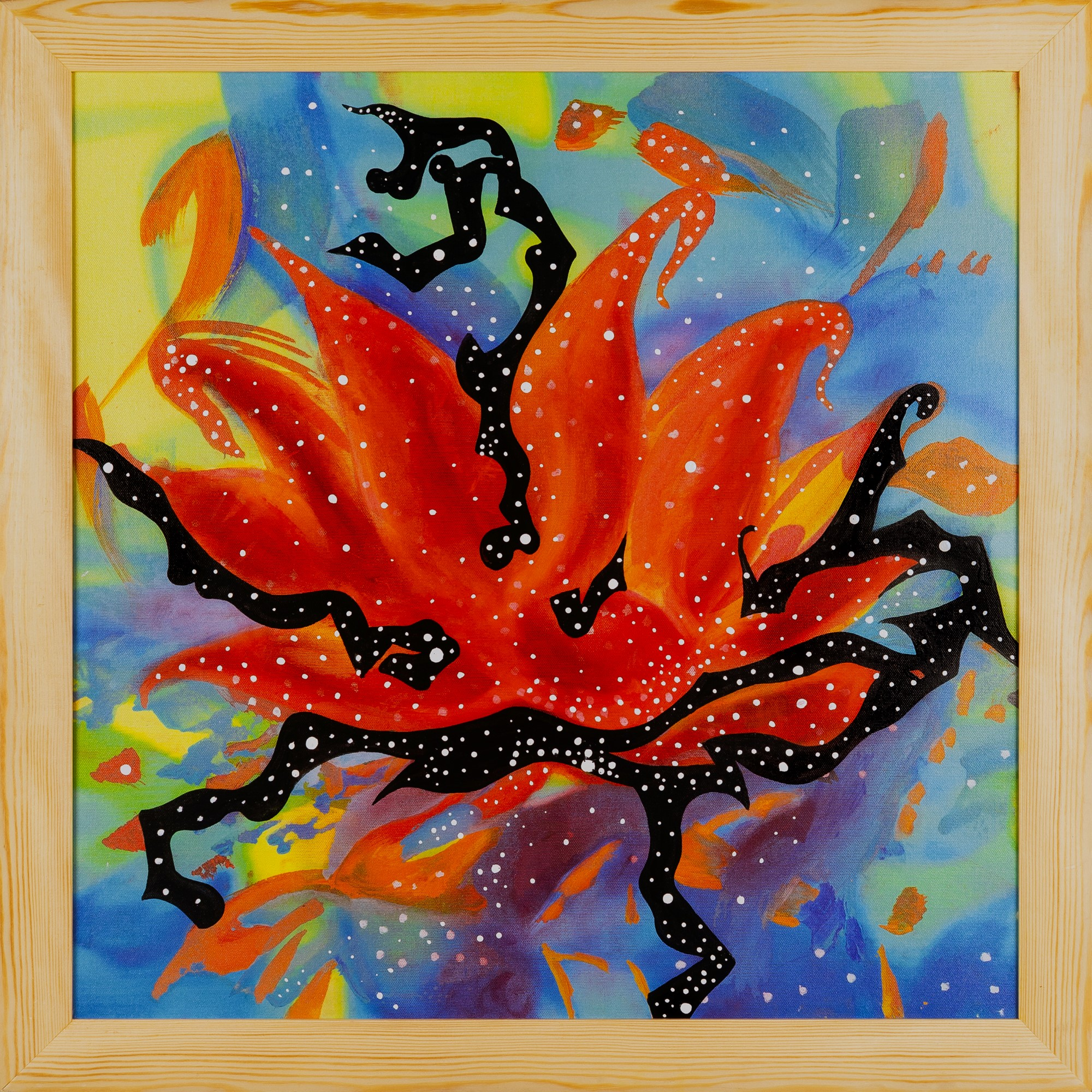
Lily 7
