= Object Orange =

Artistic project in Detroit, Michigan

Object Orange (formerly Detroit. Demolition. Disneyland.) is an artistic project in Detroit, Michigan which seeks to draw attention to dilapidated buildings by painting them orange.

The project is composed of local artists, who go by their first names only (Christian, Jacques, Greg, Mike and Andy) for fear of prosecution. James Canning, communications coordinator for the Mayor's office of Detroit, views the artists' actions as unlawful and vandalism, stating that any demolitions which took place following the project's painting expeditions have been coincidental.

The artists chose the color "Tiggerific Orange" from the Disney paint catalog by Behr for its similarity to traffic cones and the safety orange worn by hunters.

== See also ==
- urban decay
- protest art
