= Paweł Kuczyński =

Polish painter and singer (born 1976)

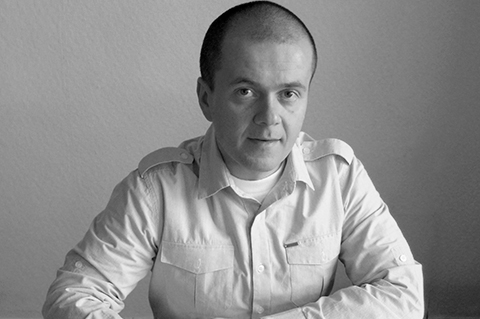
- Born: August 16, 1976 (age 50); Szczecin, Polish People's Republic
- Education: University of Fine Arts in Poznań
- Known for: Graphic designer, Painter, Drawer
- Movement: Political art
- Awards: Eryk Prize, Special Prize of NTV Channel", Silver plate at 17th Salon of Antiwar Cartoons
- Website: www.pawelkuczynski.com

Paweł Kuczyński is a Polish born political art satirist and philosopher who is anti-war.

== Awards ==
- 2013: silver plate at Salon of Antiwar Cartoons in Serbia.
- 2010: Silver prize at the Dicaco International Cartoon Contest.
- 2008: Golden hat at the international Cartoonfestival Knokke-Heist.
- Eryk Award (named after Eryk Lipiński) by the Association of Polish Cartoonists

== Exhibitions ==
He held an exhibition in Brussels.

In 2015 he exhibited at Cartoon Xira soon after the Charlie Hebdo incident.
