= Helena (Hugo Raspoet song) =

1970 song by Belgian singer Hugo Raspoet

- 2020 7" vinyl single cover

Single by Hugo Raspoet

from the album Raspoet
- Language: Dutch
- Released: 1970
- Genre: Easy listening
- Length: 4:43
- Label: Disques Vogue
- Songwriter: Hugo Raspoet
- Producer: Roland Verlooven

Helena is a 1970 song by Flemish kleinkunst singer Hugo Raspoet. It's considered his signature song and his most famous song, alongside Evviva Il Papa. In 2012 the song was inaugurated in Radio 2's De Eregalerij, a gallery for best Dutch-language songs.

== Lyrics ==
Helena is a reflection of a man on his female partner. He observes that they love one another, but that their personalities are just too different to continue their relationship. Raspoet was inspired by his own past relationships and named the song after Helen of Troy, since she was the archetype of all women. He wrote five years on the song.

== Cover versions ==
Helena has been covered by Mama's Jasje in 1997 and by Kries Roosse in 2003. In 2006 Helena was covered by Rocco Granata.
