= GAL (cartoonist) =

Belgian political cartoonist, graphic artist and painter

- Born: Gerard Alsteens; 3 August 1940 (age 86); Auderghem, Brussels
- Movement: Cartoonist

Gerard Alsteens (born 3 August 1940, in Auderghem) is a Belgian political cartoonist, graphic artist and painter who works under the pseudonym "GAL".. He is infamous for his sharp political cartoons which, artistically speaking, share a closer resemblance to paintings than regularly drawn cartoons. Throughout the years his work has received several prizes and awards.

== Biography ==
GAL was born in 1940 in Auderghem, Brussels, together with his twin brother Edgard. He has 3 sons Anant Alsteens, Joachim Alsteens and Bram Alsteens. At the age of twelve he won a drawing contest in the newspaper Het Nieuws van den Dag. He studied painting and graphic art at the higher St. Lucas-instituut in Brussels, where he would later become a teacher. In his penultimate year at Sint-Lucas Gal worked as apprentice at the Jesuit weekly magazine De Linie. The next two years he was in charge of the magazine's layout. When the publication of the magazine ceased in 1964 Gal drew the final cover featuring a cut down tree with the words "De Linie" written on the tree bark, crushing the Flemish Lion in its fall.

Gal's first cartoons were published in 1960 and appeared in various magazines, most prominently De Nieuwe and De Zwijger, where he was the house cartoonist. Since 1984 GAL publishes in the weekly magazine Knack. Over the years his cartoons have been the subject of censorship by the magazine's editors and those published sometimes caused offended letters from readers. In 1996 GAL was a guest in the political talkshow De Zevende Dag on the Flemish national TV station VRT, in a special transmission live from the Flemish Parliament. When he showed some cartoons critical of the then popular far-right party Vlaams Blok (today Vlaams Belang) all members of the party left the building in offense.

In 2004 GAL temporarily lost his eyesight due to an embolism. After a while he discovered a handy method to continue his work.

On 2 April 2019 Gal received an honorary doctorate from the Free University in Brussels.

== Status ==
GAL's social engagement as a cartoonist is not restricted to solely drawing and painting. The past decades he participated in many public demonstrations, among others against the Vietnam War. He also devoted his talent and energy to many political and social causes, including Oxfam, Amnesty International, and made cartoons and illustrations for magazines like Humo, De Nieuwe, Panorama/De Post, De Zwijger and De Morgen. He is also a well requested illustrator of book covers, posters and logos. His posters against South Africa's apartheid policy were distributed globally. One time GAL was watching a news bulletin on TV when he saw a report about a house of an ANC activist destroyed by a bomb attack. On the walls of the burned-out building he saw one of his anti-apartheid posters. This is also the reason why GAL prides himself in having made an important contribution in getting "apartheid down to its knees".

== Style ==
GAL's cartoons share a closer resemblance to paintings than regular black-and-white cartoons. Also they are seldom trivial jokes about modern day affairs, but biting accusations against certain events, systems and/or politicians. He frequently experiments with different graphic techniques and formats too, including comics, collage, sculptures,...

He has illustrated novels by Kristien Hemmerechts and Geert van Istendael, as well as non-fiction works about political topics. Gal also illustrated the album cover of Zjef Vanuytsel's album "Tederheid" (1983).

== Exhibitions and prizes ==
- He won several prizes in Belgium and Nederland
- He won the Festival d'Avignon
- Three times laureat at the International Cartoon Festival in Knokke-Heist
- Four times laureat at the Perskartoenale in Hoeilaart
- In 1980 he was selected by the Belgian state for the Venice Biennale
- In 1980 he won the Louis Paul Boonprijs
- Prize of the Vlaamse Gemeenschap voor Grafische Kunsten (Flemish Community for Graphic Arts) (1988)
- Laureat for best political cartoon in Havana (1991)
- Ark Prize of the Free Word (1994)
- The BeNe Prijs (2004)
- Honorary doctorate from the Free University Brussels, 2019
- AL GAL te Cultuurcentrum Mechelen 2021
- Statue - "Rosine, Grape Picker Between the Grape Vines" in Overijse (2023)
- GAL Total - A retrospective of the Commune of Schaerbeek, Luca school of Art Brussels, Bib sofia & Cava VUB (2023)
- Brusseleir vè et leive (2023)
- 1st prize - Grand Prix Press Cartoon Belgium in Knokke (2025)

== Bibliography ==
- Johan Anthierens: "GAL: de overspannen jaren, opgetekend van 1960 tot 1996", uitgeverij Epo, Brussel, 1996
- Alsteens, Gerard, "Gal: een halve eeuw op het scherpst van de snee", uitgeverij Van Halewyck, Brussel, 2010
- Alsteens, Gerard, "Gal: Al Gal: inkijk in het universum van Gal", uitgeverij Stockmans Art Books, Brussel, 2021
