= Urszula Plewka-Schmidt =

Polish tapestry artist (1939–2008)

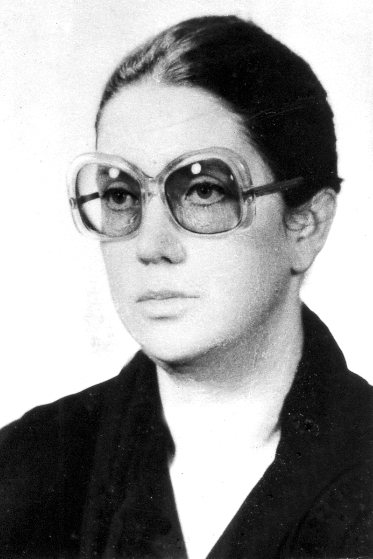
Urszula Plewka-Schmidt

Urszula Plewka-Schmidt (29 December 1939, Smogulecka Wieś, Poland - 20 January 2008, Pławno, Poland) was a Polish artist and teacher, a co-founder of the "Polish school of tapestry", creator of monumental wall compositions.

== Biography ==
A graduate of Agricultural University of Poznań in Poznań (currently known as the University of Life Sciences) in 1964 she attended the College of Fine Arts (later University of Arts) in Poznań and received her diploma at the faculty of painting in 1966 in the studio of Professor. M. Szmańda. She worked at the university until 1992. She started at the studio of M. Abakanowicz and became in 1980 head of the color studio at the Faculty of Interior Design. In 1991 she founded Schola Posnaniensis, the Higher School of Applied Arts and was its president and a lecturer until 2007.

== Artistic activity ==
She commenced her artistic activity in the 1970s by creating woven forms and spatial structures, metal structures covered with weaving material. This was also the time of the introduction of tapestry into spatial designs such as "Landscape activities", which were a form of performance to be recorded photographically. The later period was marked by the artist's return to weaving techniques which she applied in her work ever since. Participation in the prestigious 5th International Biennial of Tapestry in Lausanne in 1971 led to the invitations to the succeeding bi-annual events and paved the way to many exhibitions worldwide. Her presentation at the 1979 International Biennial turned out to be a breakthrough: the tapestries Madonna from Krużlowa and Marilyn Monroe. This confrontation of two canons of beauty, history and modern times was the artist's response to the discussion between twentieth-century artists on the mutual infiltration of various art disciplines. A frequent theme of the monumental works of Plewka-Schmidt is the contemplation of time, its passing, its impact on people and the interpretation of the traditions of the past. In her wall tapestry compositions the artist uses, among others, familiar images of secular art and objects of worship.

== Gallery ==
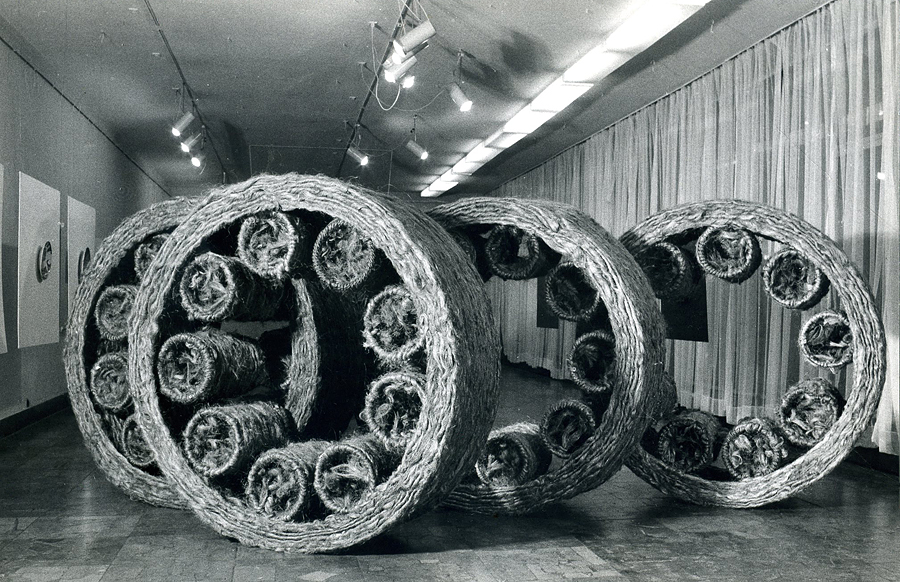
"Circle" - 7th International Biennial of Tapestry, Lausanne, 1975

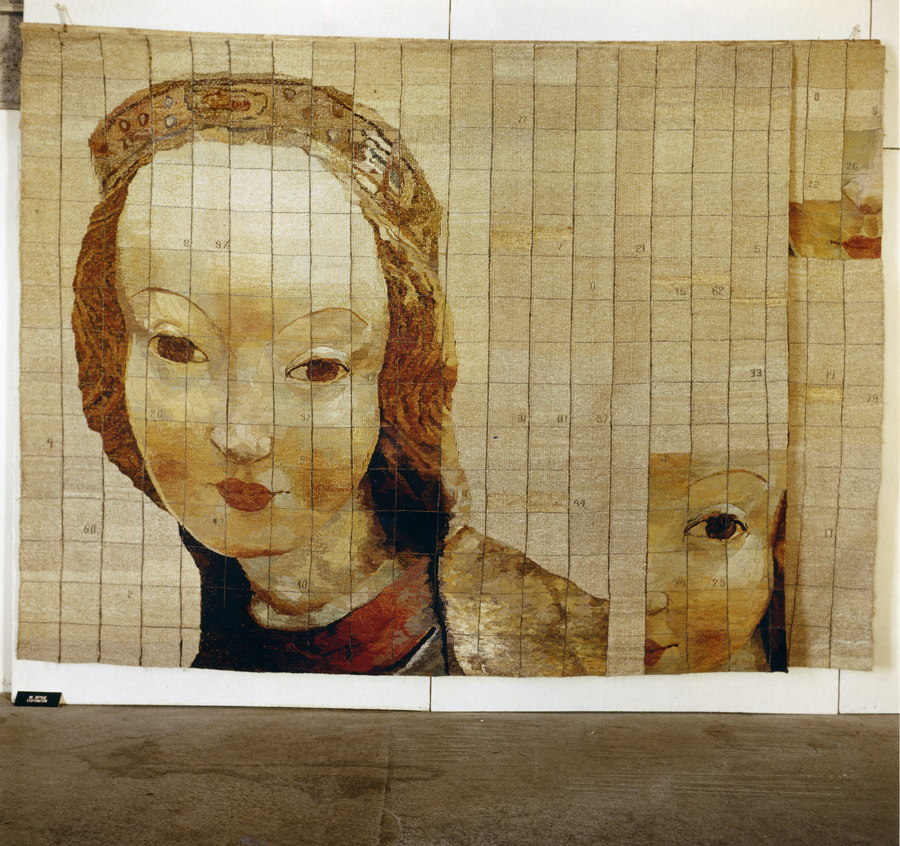
"Canons of beauty" 9th International Biennial of Tapestry, Lausanne, 1979

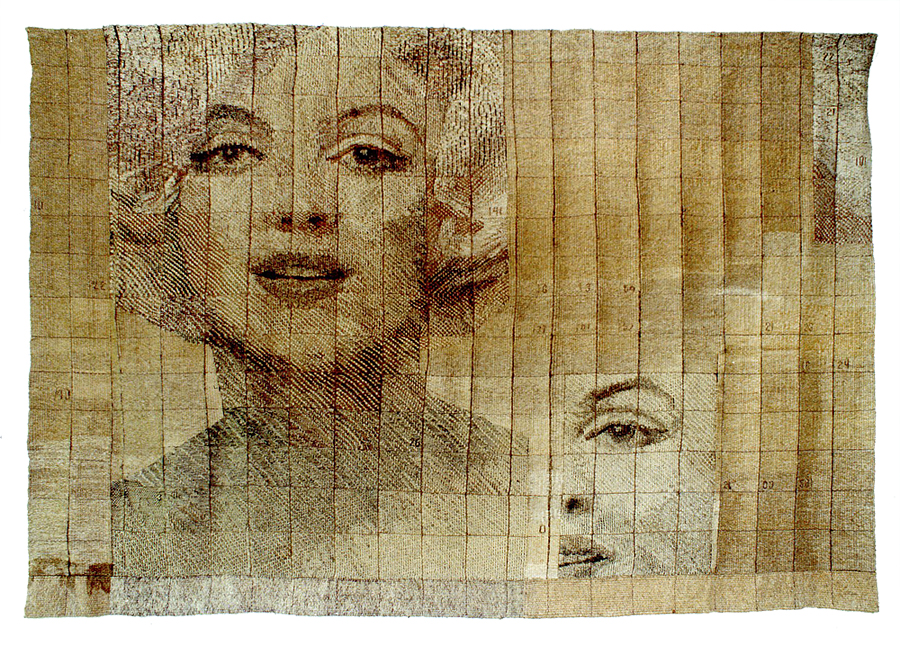
"Canons of beauty" 9th International Biennial of Tapestry, Lausanne, 1979

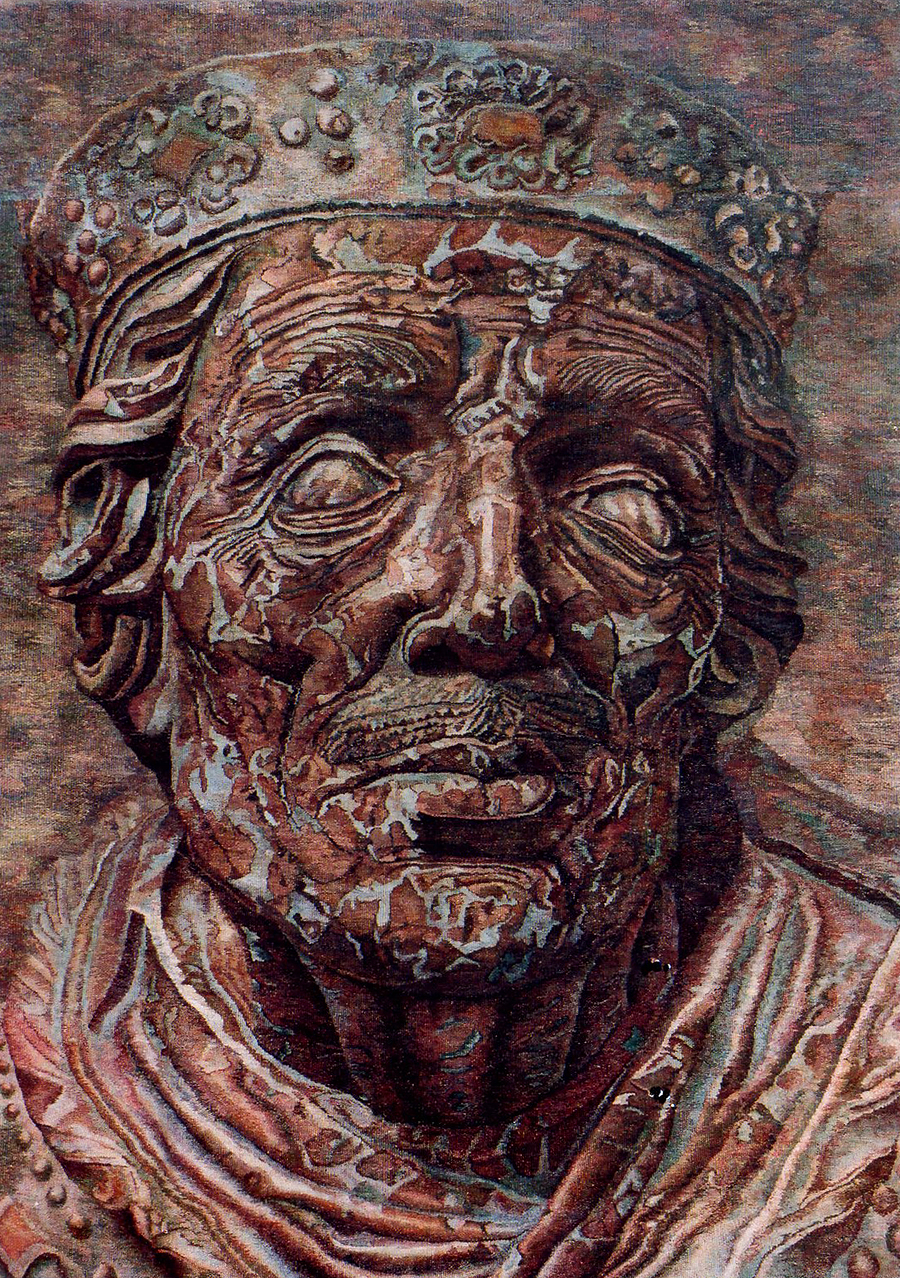
"The time of life, the time of death", 1986

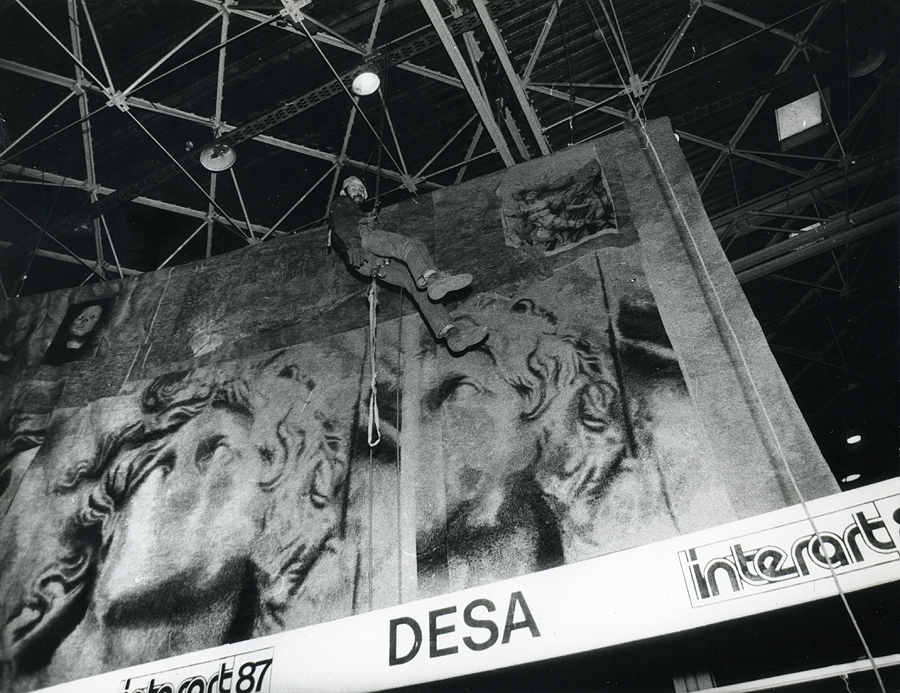
"Gardens of Memory", 1987

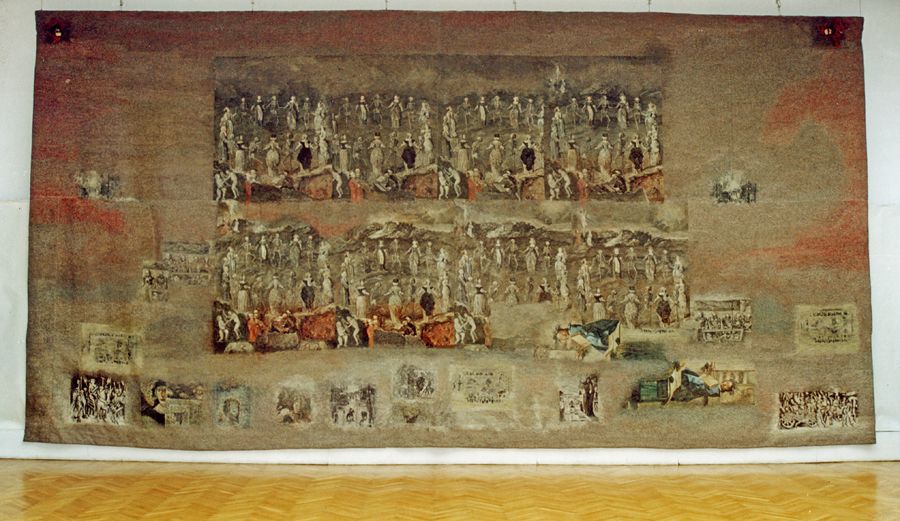
"Notebook", 2000

== Cycles ==
- "Journey to the sources of time", 1978
- "The time of life, the time of death," 1986
- "Gardens of Memory", 1987
- "This twentieth century", 2001

== Major exhibitions ==
- 1971 5th International Biennial of Tapestry in Lausanne
- 1972 Central Museum of Textiles, Łódź "Weaving compositions"
- 1973 6th International Biennial of Tapestry in Lausanne
- 1975 7th International Biennial of Tapestry in Lausanne
- 1977 Biuro Wystaw Artystycznych, Poznań "Exhibition of tapestries"
- 1977 8th International Biennial of Tapestry in Lausanne
- 1979 9th International Biennial of Tapestry in Lausanne
- 1980 Central Museum of Textiles, Łódź "Journey to the sources of time"
- 1980, 1982, 1984 Chateau de Copet, Geneva: individual exhibitions
- 1981 10th International Biennial of Tapestry in Lausanne
- 1985 National Philharmonic, Warsaw - an exhibition of a cycle of tapestries titled "Chopin"
- 1987 Jacques Baruch Gallery, Chicago – an individual exhibition "U.P.Schmidt tapestry"
- 1988 Interart 88, Poznań - an individual exhibition of tapestries and spatial compositions
- 1992 Galeria Atena (Atena Gallery), Warsaw, an exhibition of tapestries accompanying the 7th International Triennial of Tapestry, Łódź 92
- 1997 Centrum Sztuki – Galeria El (Art Center - El Gallery), Elbląg, "U.P.Schmidt . Monumental tapestry”
- 1997 Hertogenbosch, Provinciehuis
- 2000 Biuro Wystaw Artystycznych, Gorzów Wielkopolski – an individual exhibition
- 2000 Galeria Sztuki Współczesnej (Contemporary Art Gallery) - an individual exhibition
- 2001 Central Museum of Textiles, Łódź, 10th International Triennial of Tapestry - an individual exhibition

== Individual exhibitions ==
Since 1972 several domestic and foreign exhibitions including: Pittsburg, Geneva, Hertogenbosch, Eindhoven, Freiburg, Chicago, Stockholm, Moscow.

== Group exhibitions ==
Since 1965 participation in many domestic and foreign exhibitions and international presentations of Polish art including: Lausanne, Haarlem, Groningen, Venlo, Edinburgh, Liverpool, London, Havana, Brno, Chicago, Austin, Cleveland, Copenhagen, Aalborg, Prague, Chicago, New York, Berlin, Hamburg, Lille, Paris, Zagreb, Belgrade, Düsseldorf, San Francisco, Helsinki, Madrid, Lisbon, Moscow, Mexico City, Regstrup, Angers.

== Works included in the following collections ==
- Kunstgewerbemuseum – Staatlicher Preußischer Kulturbesitz, Berlin, Germany, Berlin
- The Jasna Góra Monastery, Częstochowa, Poland (together with Włodzimierz Schmidt)
- Museum of the Origins of the Polish State, Gniezno, Poland
- Central Museum of Textiles, Łódź, Poland
- National Museum in Poznań, Poland
- Cantonal Museum of Fine Arts, Lausanne, Switzerland
- The Art Institut of Chicago, Chicago, USA
- the Vatican Museum, Vatican
- In addition, in collections and private collections in France, Israel, Germany, New Zealand, Norway, Poland, Switzerland, USA

== Awards ==
- Scholarship of the Ministry of Culture and Arts, 1974
- Award of the Poznań Voivodeship for outstanding achievements in the field of the dissemination of culture, 1979
- The Blessed Brother Albert Award for artistic activities with sacral themes, 1988
- Individual award of the city of Poznań, 1989
- Award of the Ministry of Culture and Art of the 3rd degree for outstanding achievements in teaching and education
- Medal "Ad Perpetua Rei Memoriam" awarded by the voivode of Poznań, 1996
- Medal of the Central Museum of Textiles in Łódź (10th International Triennial of Tapestry) 2001
