= Ilah (cartoons) =

Belgian comic book artist

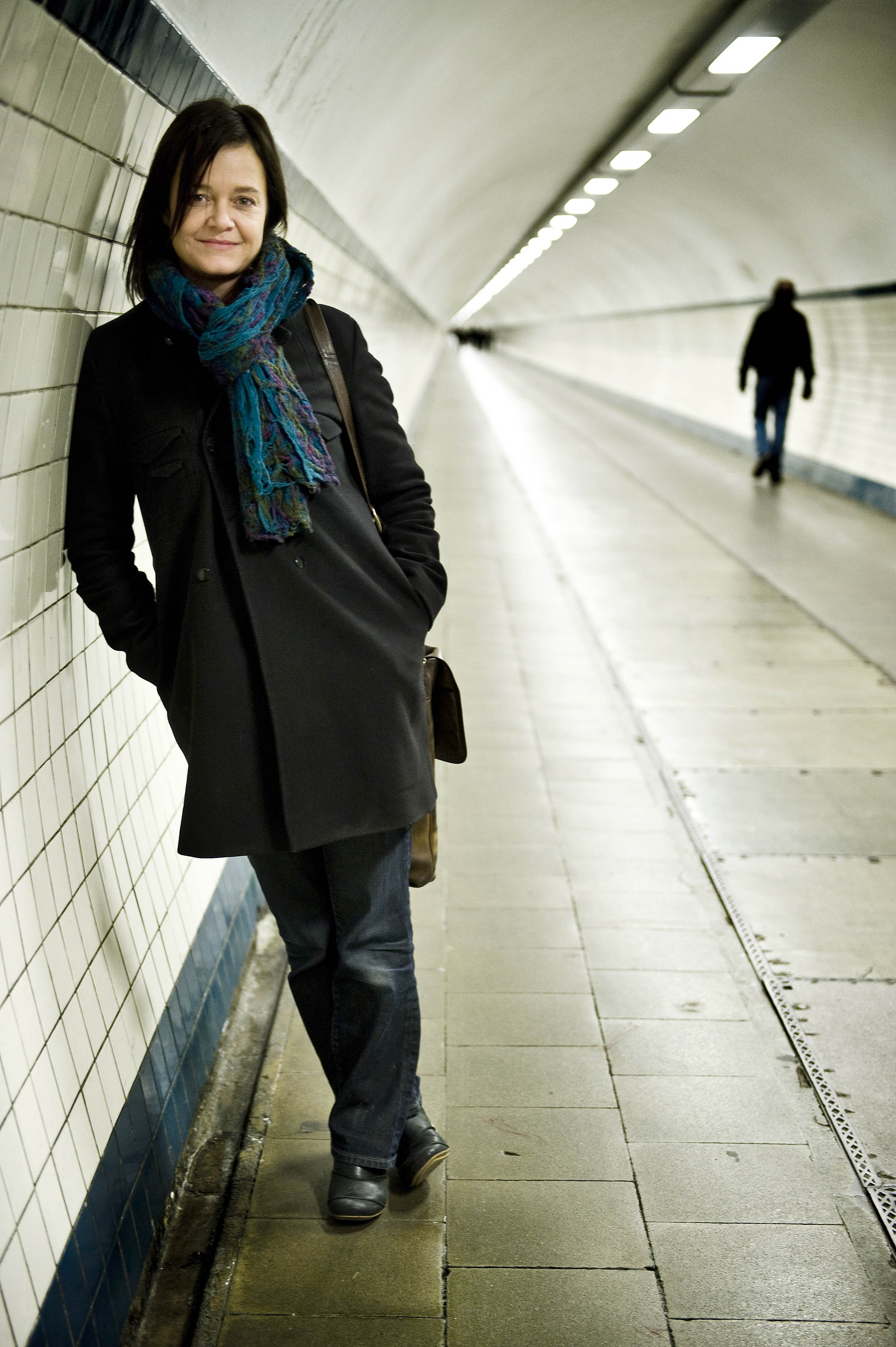
Photograph of Ilah in the Sint-Anna tunnel, or De Voetgangerstunnel, Antwerp.

Ilah is the nom-de-plume of Inge Liesbeth Alfonsina Heremans (Leuven, 25 January 1971), a Belgian comic book artist, mainly known for her Cordelia series, a gag-a-day comic about a young woman, which has gained popularity and notoriety for openly but tastefully dealing with themes like sex and masturbation. Ilah is also a prominent illustrator of advertisements for the Antwerp book festival De Boekenbeurs and the bus company De Lijn.

== Biography ==
She studied applied graphics at the LUCA School of Arts in Brussels and then received a master's degree in philosophy from the Catholic University in Leuven. The Cordelia series, which she developed in 1996, appears in the newspaper De Morgen. Several collections of Cordelia strips have also been published. Another strip based on a character named Mira appears in Flair) magazine. Her work also appears in De Tijd, De Standaard, Focus Knack, Menzo, Ad Valvas, Frontaal Naakt and GeenStijl.
