= Boerke =

Cartoon character

Publication information
- Publisher: Ballon; Nanuq
- Created by: Pieter De Poortere

In-story information
- Notable aliases: Dickie

Boerke is a Flemish cartoon character created by Pieter De Poortere in 2001. The name is a diminutive of boer and so means "little farmer" in Dutch. He has been translated into other languages such as French where he is known as Dickie. The character is a farmer but is often shown in other costumes and settings as an anti-hero. The comic strips are typically visual jokes with no text.

The character's comic strips appear in magazines and newspapers such as Knack, have been collected in book form and are exhibited at a museum in Brussels – the Belgian Comic Strip Center.

An animated version has been shown on the Flemish TV station, VRT. Fifty-two two-minute episodes were shown on its Canvas channel, starting in 2021. To preserve the non-verbal quality of the humour, the characters' vocalisations are humming, mumbles, screams and other vocables. For the main character, these were performed by voice artist Jos Dom in the style of Mr. Bean.

In 2022, the character was used to lead a campaign against plastic pollution.

== Reception ==
The first collection of Boerke won a prize as the best comic in the Dutch language.
