= List of Polish photographers =

A list of notable photographers from Poland:

- Mariusz Adamski
- Mirosław Araszewski
- Leon Barszczewski
- Andrzej Baturo
- Zdzisław Beksiński
- Joshua Budziszewski Benor
- Paweł Bielec
- Wilhelm Brasse
- Sylwester Braun
- Zbigniew Brym
- Jan Bułhak
- Michał Cała
- Erazm Ciołek
- Jacenty Dędek
- Zbigniew Dłubak
- Maksymilian Fajans
- Janusz Gajos
- Jadwiga Golcz
- Edward Hartwig
- Mariusz Hermanowicz
- Ryszard Horowitz
- Zuzanna Janin
- Mieczysław Karłowicz
- Bogdan Konopka
- Ewa Kuryluk
- Eugeniusz Lokajski
- Roman Loranc
- Andrzej Majewski
- Michal Martychowiec
- Maciej Michalski
- Justyna Mielnikiewicz (born 1973)
- Rafał Milach
- Chris Niedenthal
- Szymon Niemiec
- Kazimierz Nowak
- Krzysztof Olszewski
- Stanisław Julian Ostroróg, ps Walery father
- Stanisław Julian Ignacy Ostroróg, ps Walery son
- Andrzej Pawłowski
- Jarosław Pijarowski
- Joanna Piotrowska
- Wojciech Plewiński
- Robert Pranagal
- Włodzimierz Puchalski
- Henryk Ross
- Eva Rubinstein
- Wilhelm Russ
- Walery Rzewuski
- Jeanloup Sieff
- David Seymour
- Tomasz Sobecki
- Rosław Szaybo
- Stefan Themerson
- Jerzy Tomaszewski
- Jacek Tylicki
- Piotr Uklański
- Stanisław Ignacy Witkiewicz
- Casimir Zagourski
- Joanna Zastróżna
- Artur Żmijewski (filmmaker)
