= List of Polish contemporary artists =

This is a list of Polish contemporary artists:

A B C D E F G H I J K L M N O P R S–Ś T U V W Z–Ż

== A ==
- Magdalena Abakanowicz (1930-2017), sculptor
- Wiesław Adamski (born 1947), sculptor
- Kazimierz Adamski (born 1964), sculptor
- Janusz Akermann (born 1957), painter and professor of Fine Arts in Gdańsk
- Paweł Althamer (born 1967), sculptor, performance artist, installation artist
- Maess Anand (born 1982), drawing artist
- Sylwester Ambroziak (born 1964), sculptor

== B ==
- Stanisław Baj (born 1953), painter
- Tomasz Bajer (born 1971), sculptor, visual artist
- Agnieszka Balewska (born 1967), painter, performance artist
- Mirosław Bałka (born 1958), painter, sculptor, installation artist
- Krzysztof Bednarski (born 1953), sculptor
- Zdzisław Beksiński (1929–2005), painter, photographer
- Jan Berdyszak (1934-2014), installation artist
- Kiejstut Bereźnicki (born 1935), painter
- Alicja Buławka-Fankidejska (born 1983), ceramist
- Bogna Burska (born 1974), installation artist
- Agnieszka Brzezańska (born 1972), visual artist
- Józef Bury (born 1961), multidisciplinary artist
- Jerzy Bereś (1930 - 2012), sculptor, multidisciplinary artist

== C ==
- Michał Cała (born 1948), photographer

== D ==
- Jerzy Duda-Gracz (1941–2004), painter
- Kasia Domanska (1972), painter

== E ==
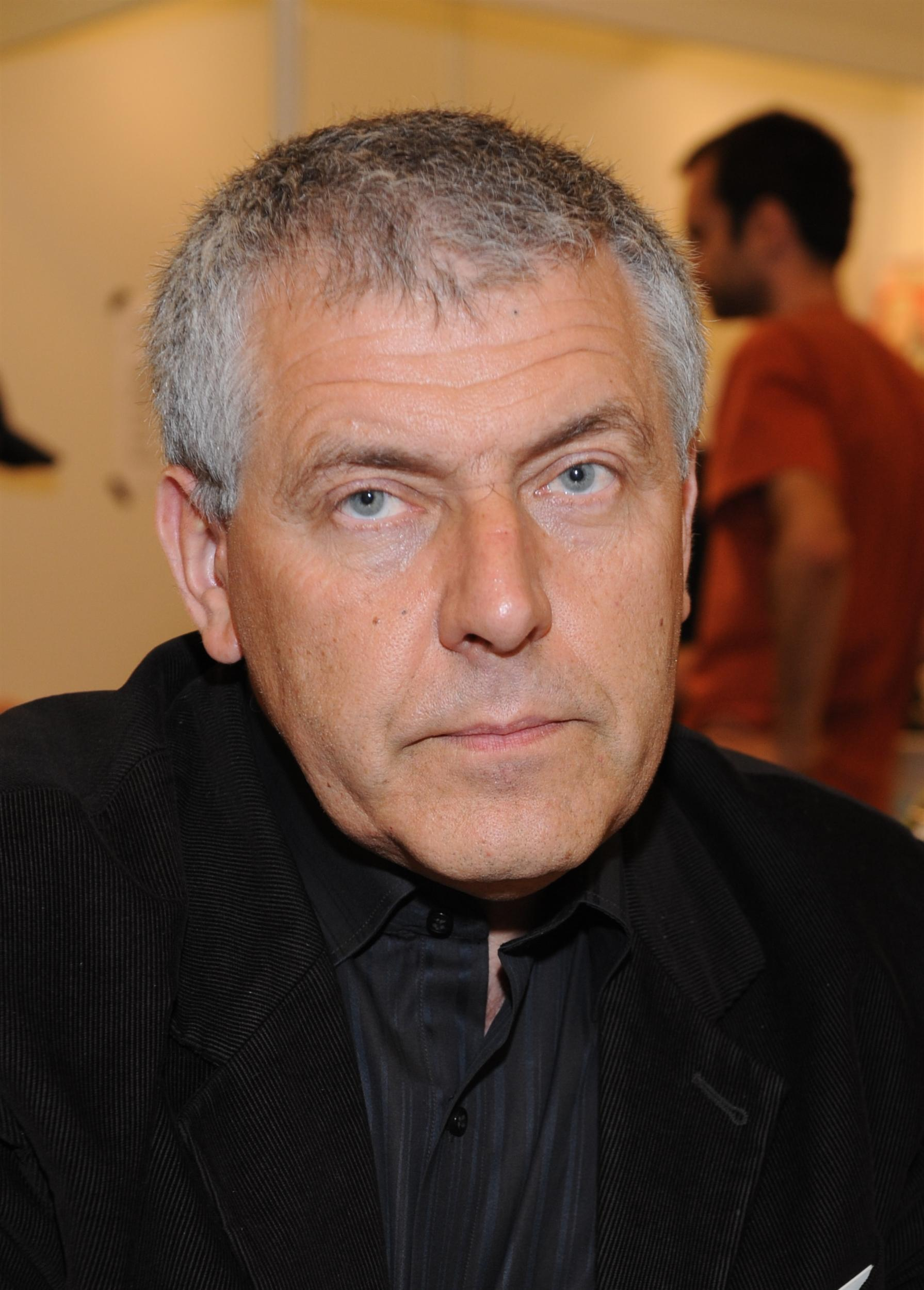
Stasys Eidrigevičius

- Stasys Eidrigevičius (born 1949), graphic, photographer

== F ==
- Wojciech Fangor (1922 – 2015), painter
- Waldemar Fydrych (born 1953), performer

== G ==
- Krzysztof Gliszczyński (born 1962), painter
- Peter Grzybowski (born 1954), painter, performer
- Roman Gajewski (born 1954), painter
- Peter Grzybowski (1954 - 2013), multimedia and performance artist, painter

== H ==
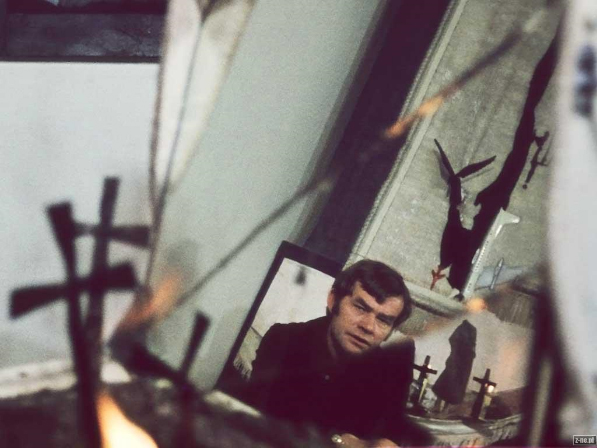
Władysław Hasior

- Władysław Hasior (1928–1999), sculptor
- Edward Hartwig (1909–2003), photographer

== I ==
- Miho Iwata (born 1962), performer

== J ==
- Rafał Jakubowicz (born 1974), visual artist
- Janusz Janowski (born 1965), painter
- Zuzanna Janin (born 1961), painter, performer, installation artist
- Aleksander Janicki (born 1963), graphic artist, photographer, performer
- Krzysztof Jung (1951-1998), painter, performer and installation artist

== K ==
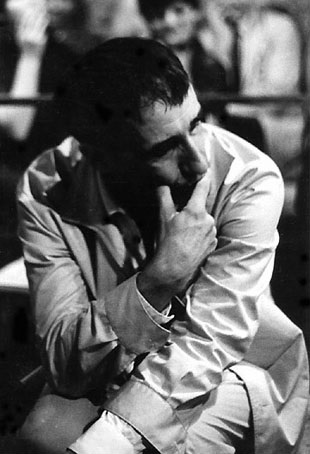
Tadeusz Kantor

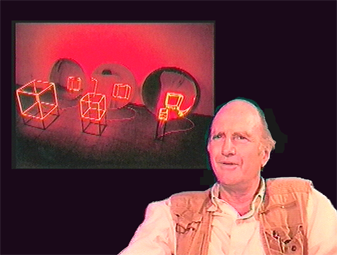
Piotr Kowalski

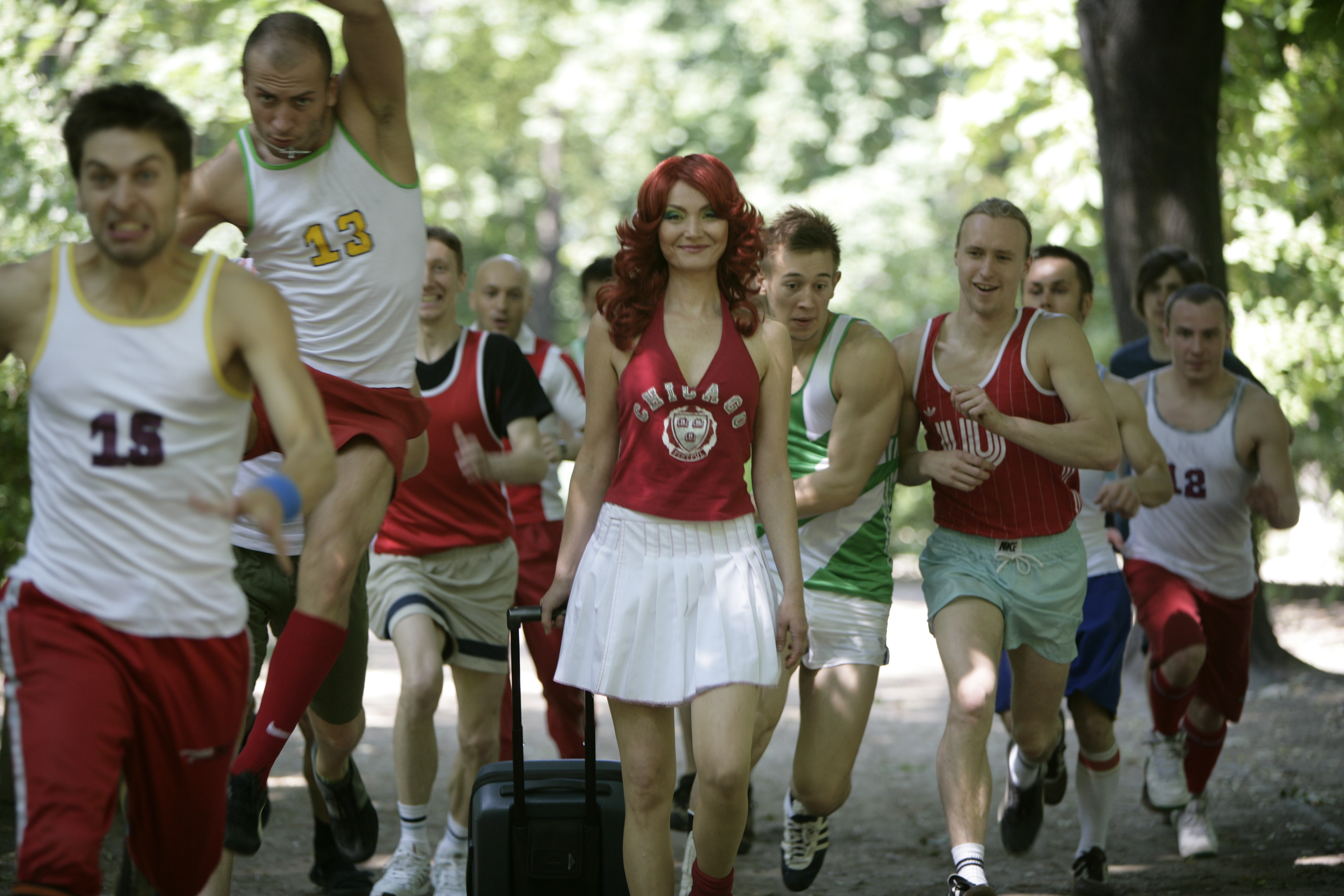
Katarzyna Kozyra

- Koji Kamoji (born 1935), painter, installation artist
- Tadeusz Kantor (1915–1990), painter, performer, assemblage artist
- Katarzyna Kobro (1898 - 1951), sculptor
- Piotr Kowalski (1927–2004), sculptor and architect
- Katarzyna Kozyra (born 1963), photography, video artist
- Wlodzimierz Ksiazek (1951-2011), abstract painter
- Zofia Kulik (born 1947), photography, performer
- Robert Kuśmirowski (born 1973), sculptor, performer, installation artist
- Andre de Krayewski (born 1933), painter
- Jarosław Kukowski (born 1972), painter
- Zofia Kulik (born 1947), performer
- Jarosław Kozłowski (born 1945), painter, conceptual artist

== L ==
- Zbigniew Libera (born 1959), photography, video and installation artist
- Norman Leto (Łukasz Banach), (born 1980), video and visual artist
- Jan Lenica (1928–2001), graphic, designer and cartoonist
- Zbigniew Lengren, cartoonist and illustrator
- Edward Lazikowski (Łazikowski) (born 1939)
- Natalia Lach-Lachowicz (Natalia LL) (born 1937), visual artist, painter
- Lea Lublin (1929 - 1999), performance

== M ==
- Goshka Macuga (born 1967), artist
- Agata Materowicz (born 1963), painter, photographer, graphic designer
- Michal Martychowiec (born 1987), photography, video and installation artist

== N ==
- Dorota Nieznalska (born 1973), sculptor, photographer

== O ==
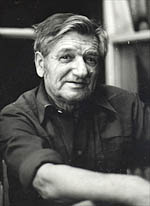
Kazimierz Ostrowski

- Teofil Ociepka (1891-1978), painter
- Rafał Olbiński (born 1943), painter, graphic
- Paulina Olowska (born 1976), painter
- Roman Opałka (1931-2011), painter
- Joseph Stanislaus Ostoja-Kotkowski (1922–1994), painter, sculptor, photographer
- Kazimierz Ostrowski (1917–1999), painter

== P ==
- Andrzej Pitynski (born 1947), sculptor
- Jarosław Pijarowski (born 1971), avant-garde artist, musician, photographer, performer
- Emil Polit (born 1940), painter
- Robert Pranagal (born 1969), photographer

== R ==
- Joanna Rajkowska (born 1968), installation artist
- Zofia Rydet (1911 – 1997), photographer

== S–Ś ==
- Joanna Salska, painter
- Wilhelm Sasnal (born 1972), painter
- Mirosław Śledź (born 1961), painter
- Monika Sosnowska, installation artist
- Henryk Stażewski (1894-1988), painter
- Irene Monat Stern (1932-2010), painter
- Józef Szajna (1922-2008), set designer, director, play writer, theoretician of the theatre, painter and graphic artist
- Alina Szapocznikow (1926–1973), sculptor
- Marek Szczęsny (born 1939), painter
- Andrzej Szewczyk (1950 - 2001), painter, conceptual artist
- Ilona Szwarc, photographer

== T ==
- Jerzy Tomaszewski (born 1924), artist, reporter and photographer
- Jacek Tylicki (born 1951), conceptual projects

== U ==
- Piotr Uklański (born 1968), photographer, installation artist
- Tomasz Urbanowicz (born 1959), architectural glass artist

== W ==
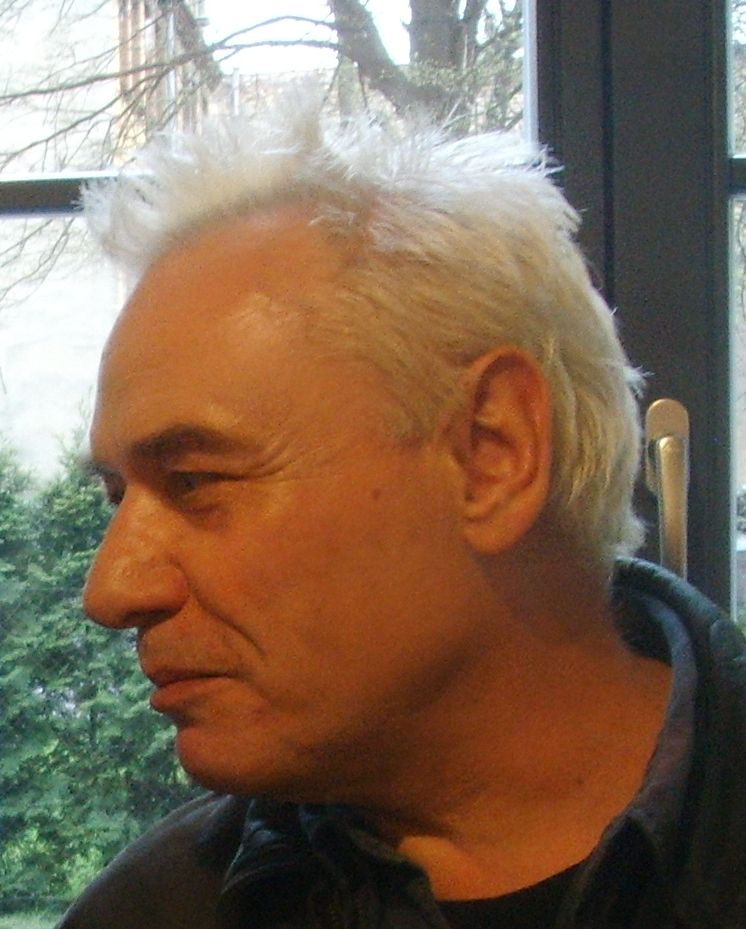
Ryszard Wasko

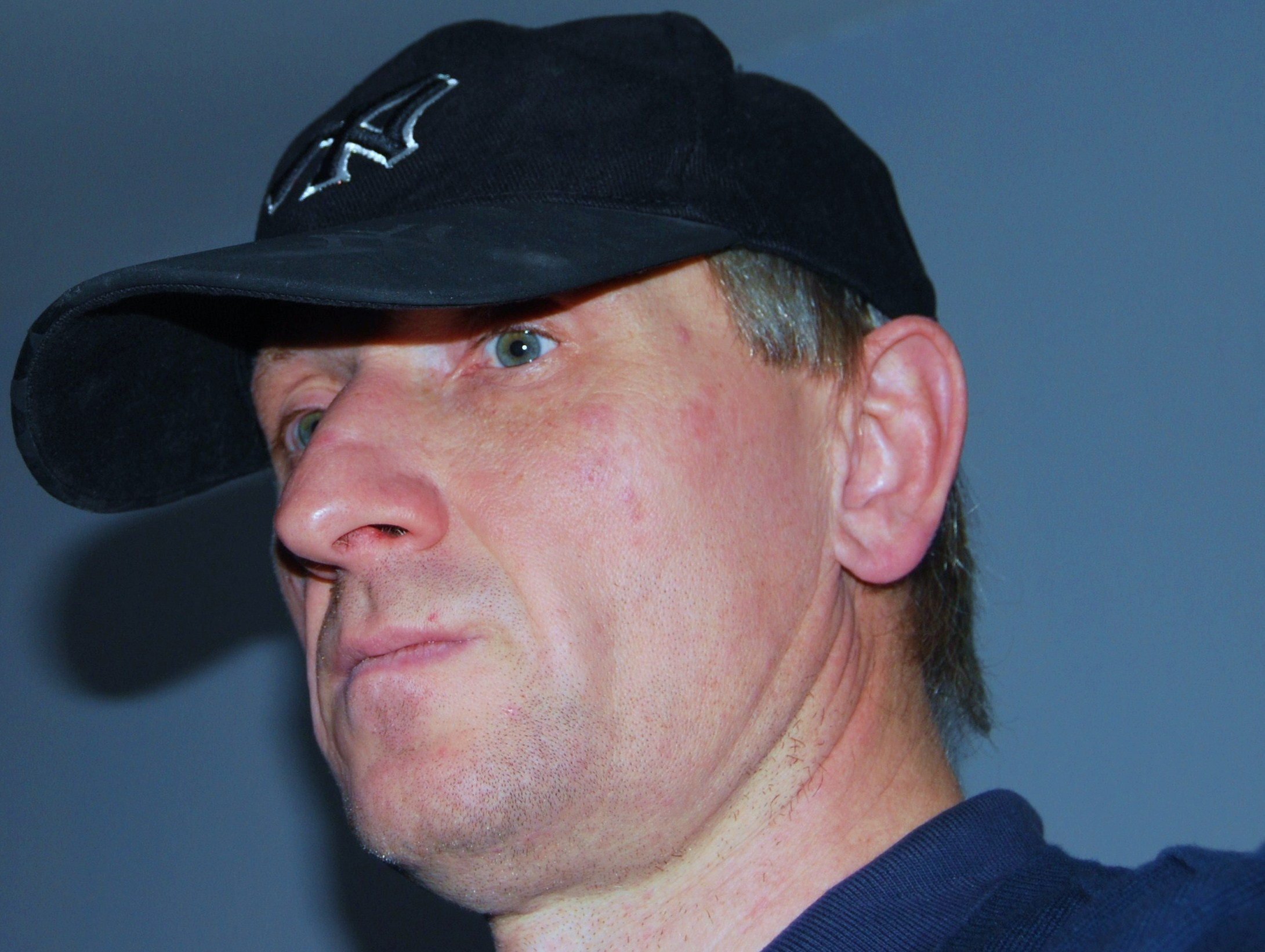
Zbigniew Wąsiel

- Ryszard Wasko (born 1947), painter, photographer, video and installation artist
- Jurek Wajdowicz (born 1951), photographer, artist, graphic designer
- Krzysztof Wodiczko (born 1943), video and installation artist
- Jan de Weryha-Wysoczański (born 1950), sculptor
- Andrzej Wróblewski (1927 - 1957), painter

== Z–Ż ==
- Włodzimierz Zakrzewski (1916–1992), painter
- Artur Żmijewski (born 1966), visual artist, filmmaker and photographer

== See also ==
- Art
- List of Polish artists
- List of Polish graphic designers
- List of Polish photographers
- List of Polish painters
- List of Polish sculptors
