= Lenngren =

Lenngren or Lengren is a Swedish surname, variants of Lönngren (Lönn+gren = "Norway maple" + "branch"). Notable persons with the surname include:

- Anna Maria Lenngren (1754–1817), Swedish poet
- Zbigniew Lengren (1919–2003), Polish cartoonist, caricaturist, and illustrator
- Tomasz Lengren (1945–2008), Polish actor, film director, and lecturer on acting
