= In Situ Contemporary Art Foundation =

2004 Polish art foundation

In Situ Contemporary Art Foundation is a Polish foundation set up in 2004 by Bożenna Biskupska and Zygmunt Rytka.

== Festivals ==
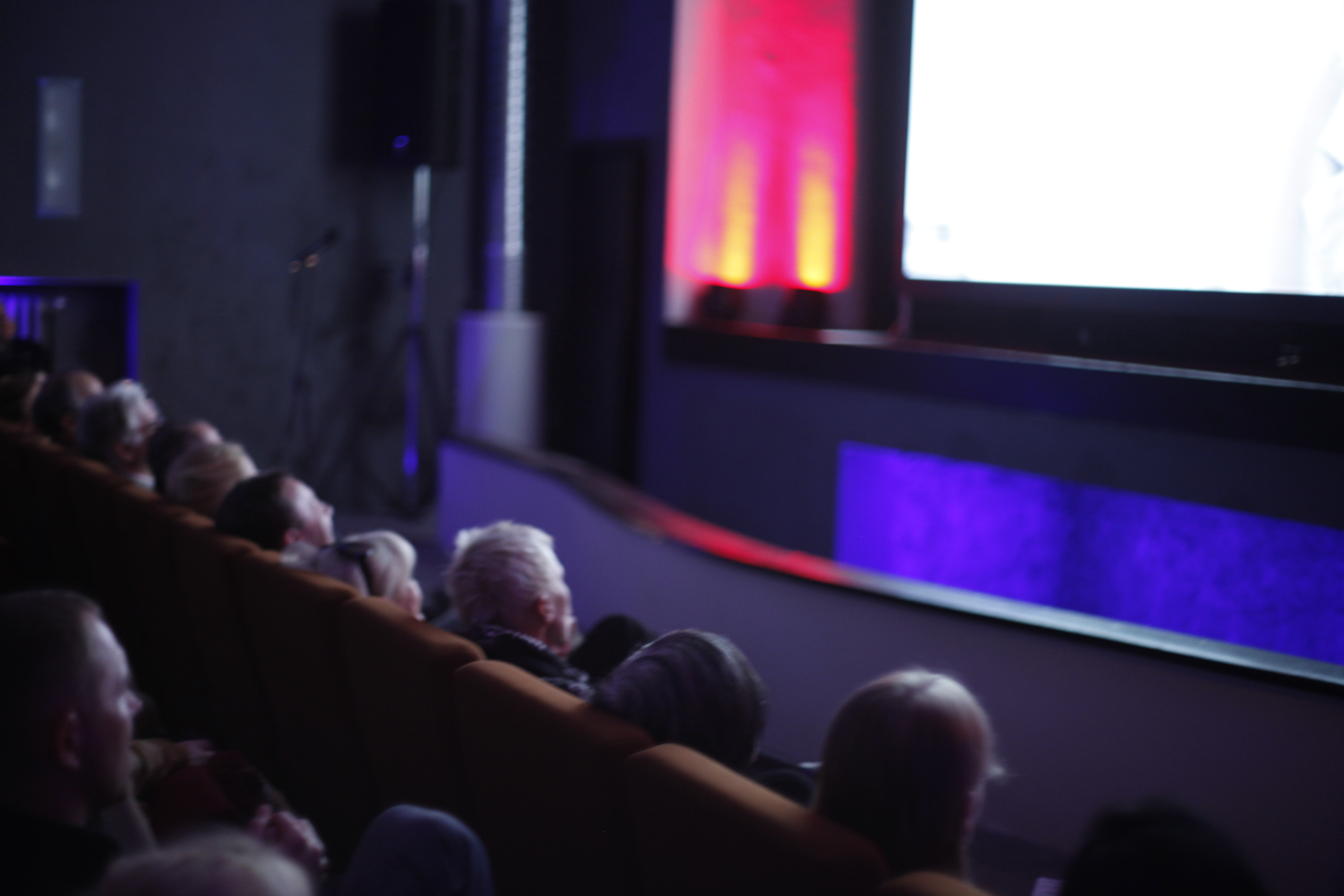
Sokolovsko Festiwal Hommage à Kieślowski 2011

=== Hommage à Kieślowski Festival, Sokolovsko ===
Every September since 2011, the In Situ Foundation organizes an international film festival called Hommage à Kieślowski in Sokolovsko, Poland, where the film director Krzysztof Kieślowski, spent his childhood. During the festival, his films are presented along with contemporary movies referencing his work, and many important figures of the Polish cinema and music scene are involved in this project, including Katarzyna Figura, Agnieszka Holland, Zbigniew Preisner, Zbigniew Zamachowski, and Philip Rappold. Screenings are held in cinemas, theaters, and outdoor cinemas, and there are discussion panels, concerts focussing on film music, exhibitions, workshops, and meetings with actors and directors.

=== Contexts ephemeral art festival, Sokolovsko ===
"Contexts" is an international artistic and educational event, that takes place every summer in Sokolovsko, which presents ephemeral art. The festival program includes performances, live action artists, presentations, including that of documentation of various artistic activities and monographic shows, film screenings, exhibitions, installations, workshops and conferences, panel discussions, lectures and meetings with artists. Many international artists have been featured in the program, including: Ines Rolo Amado, Janusz Bałdyga, Adina Bar-On, Jerzy Bereś, Nenad Bogdanovic, Loic Bertrand, Shirley Cameron, Colm Clarke, Florian Feigel, Anglika Fojtuch, Andres Galeano, Sophie Jocz, Wanda Lacrampe, Alastair MacLennan, Holly Morrison, Roland Miller, Sybille Omlin, Józef Robakowski, Nigel Rolfe, Ryszard Piegza, Andrew Spira, Jiří Surůvka, Petra Filipovska, Giullietta Ockenfuβ, Katerina Olivová, Katerina Sudolska, and Michelle Yom.

The first edition in 2011 was devoted to conceptual art – from the 70 years of avant-garde to the present day – and the work of Jan Świdziński (interdisciplinary artist, performer, art critic and philosopher). His manifesto "Art as Contextual Art" (1976) became the motto for the whole event.

The program of the 2012 edition was built around the art of Zbigniew Warpechowski. Over sixty artists, critics and art historians from many countries took part. The festival was also a place of the last performance by Jerzy Bereś, another influential Polish artist.

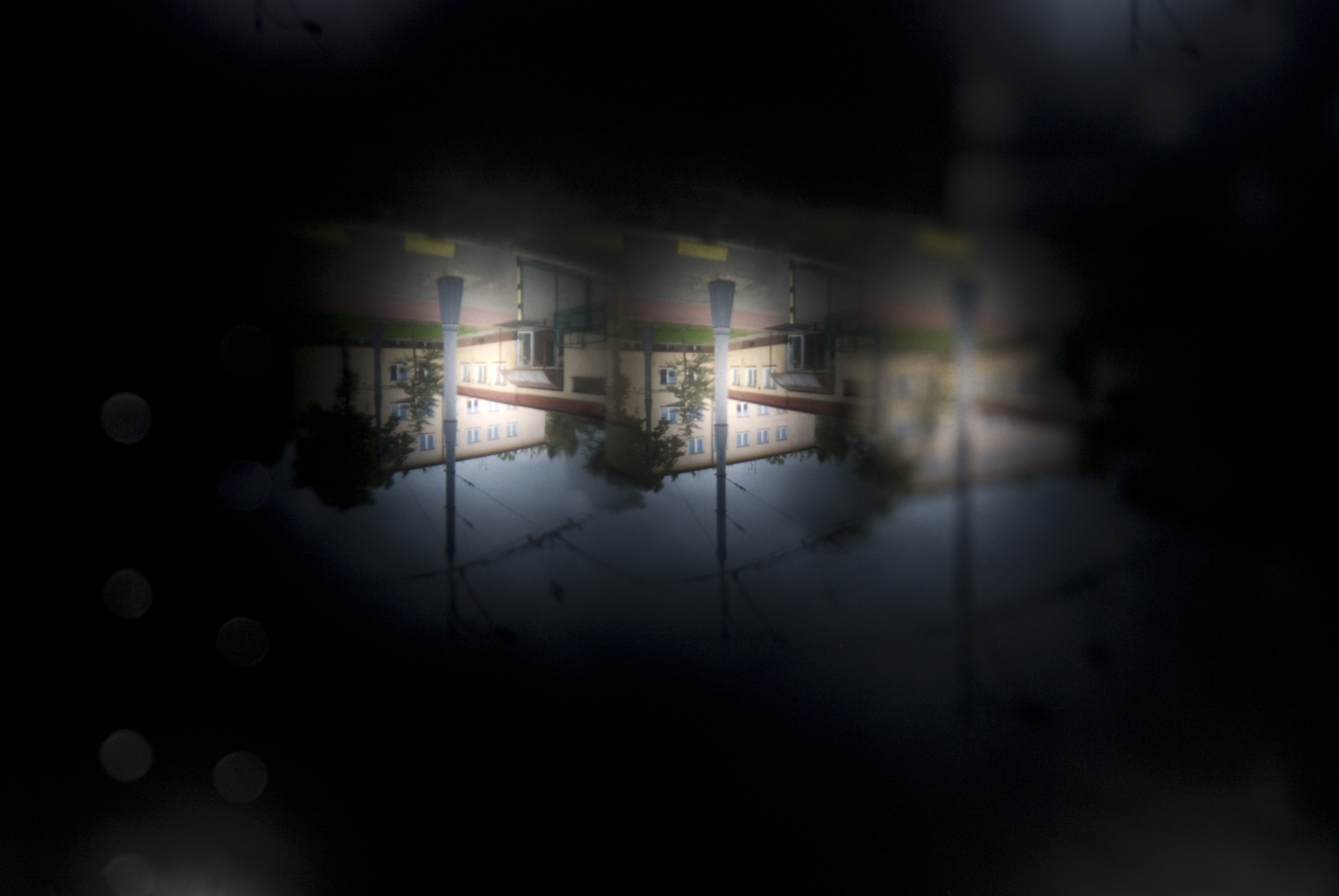
Work inside by Patrycja Stefanek Tram Obscure, Warsaw, 2007

=== Passengers public art festival ===
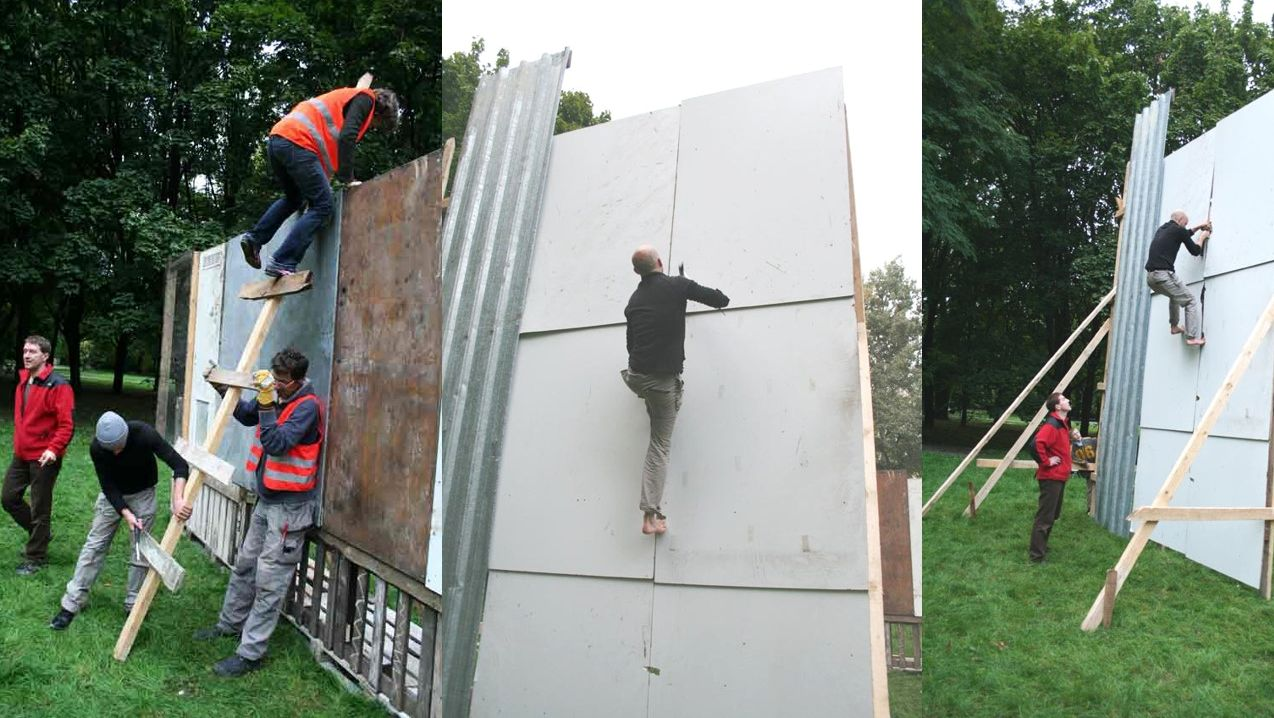
Folke Köbberling and Martin Kaltwasser performance by Patrycja Stefanek, 2008

Passengers is an urban festival, which has been running since 2007. Different artistic projects intersect in the urban space. The first event took place in a passenger tram line, exceptional tram, which was turned into a Camera obscura. The passenger could see the unusual movie made up of views of their own city. This Tram Obscure was designed by Simon Lee. Another part of this edition was Küchenmonument of Raumlabor Berlin and Plastique Fantastique, which was an ephemeral architectural object. Küchenmonument reorganised public space.

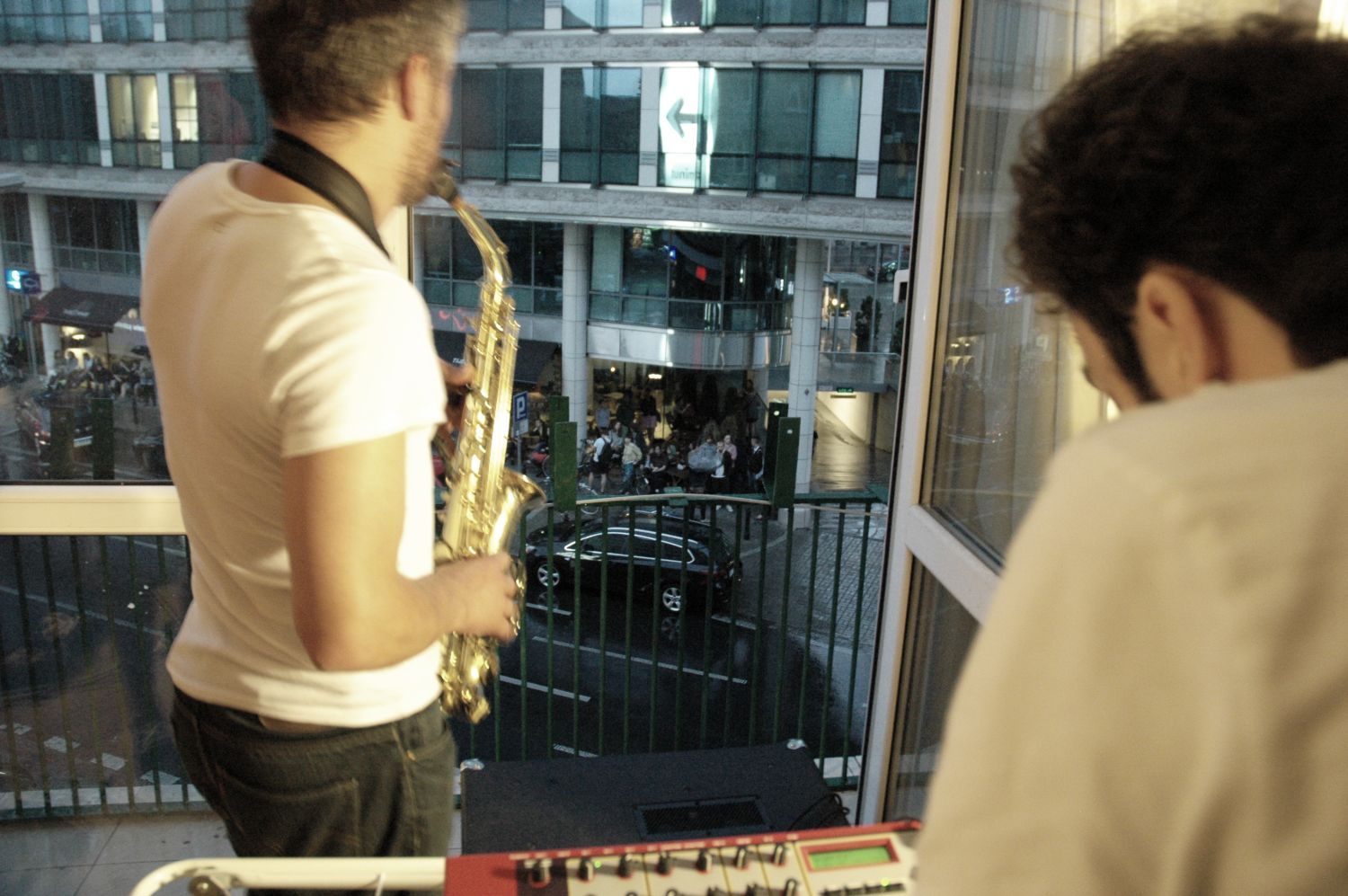
A balcony-concert, 2012

In 2008 there were several small events under the banner of fight against privatisation of public space in the city. The aim of the action was to pay attention to spaces, which had been closed, fenced-off and privatised. The performances were realised by different artist, including: Folke Köbberling, Martin Kaltwasser in co-operation with Heath Bunting (they built and crossed the artificial walls). San Keller's "Wolf’s Choir" received wide attention setting up a debate on gated communities and their influence on public space in Poland. The third edition, in 2009, presented artistic answers to the question of how to manage the financial crisis – "Money for Nothing: Manifesto" for a time of crisis. For example, Roland Schefferski in the name of a potlatch of ideas dropped tokens (which looked like coins) around the city, with the idea that people could collect and exchange them for ideas. For the fourth edition, in 2012, the foundation organised balcony-concerts with alternative music. Concerts took place on Mokotowska Street in a very special place in the city, also known as “The Warsaw Smile” because its layout on a map looks like a smile. Accompanying the festival, there was extraordinary photography exhibitions of Warsaw before 1939 in shops and café house windows.

== Selected exhibitions ==
=== Ceremonial ===
An important initiative undertaken by the foundation in 2012 was organisation of Ceremonial – an exhibition of contemporary Polish art in St. Petersburg together with Krasnoye Znamya Cultural Center. Curated of by Marcin Krasny and Katya Shadkovska, the exhibition were artistic responses to the ritualisation of funerals of public figures, and all of the works showed both the private as well as the social methods of ritualising death. Included in the show were the works of Hubert Czerepok, Wojtek Doroszuk, Poly Dwurnik, Michael Frydrych, Maurice Gomulicki, Zuzanna Janin, Krzysztof Kieslowski, Simon Kobylarz, Grzegorz Kowalski, Jacek Malinowski, Anna Molska, Anna Orlikowska, Aleka Polis, Zbigniew Rogalski, Mariusz Tarkawian, Zbigniew Warpechowski.

=== Meta-Weiss ===
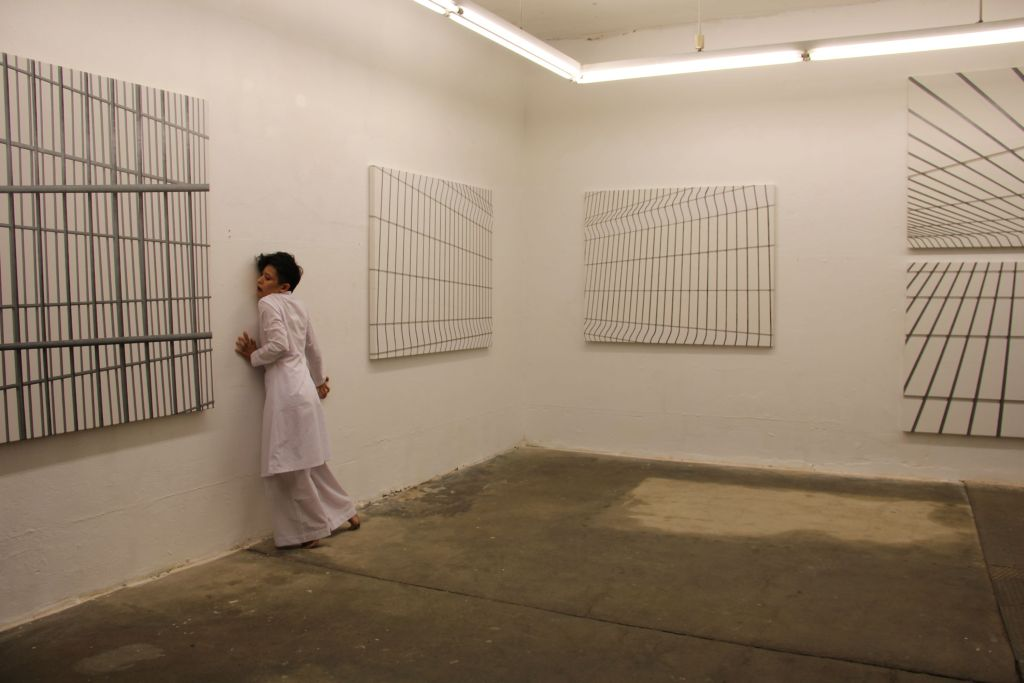
Miho Iwata during Meta-Weiss

Another international exhibition, entitled Meta-Weiss, was staged at the Freies Museum in Berlin in 2011 . It was a response to the research of new spaces in contemporary culture based on the concept of "whiteness" and was part of the cultural program accompanying the EU Parliament's Polish presidency. Exhibition in the Berlin museum included the work of artists of different generations who explored the importance of balance – in the metaphorical and material senses. The project included contributions by Bożenna Biskupska, Jakub Ciężki, Łukasz Głowacki, Miho Iwata, Koji Kamoji, Róża Litwa, Slawomir Marzec, Roman Opałka, Slawomir Pawszak, Joanna Polak, Zygmunt Rytka, Mikołaj Smoczyński, Roland Schefferski, Zbigniew Warpechowski, Noah Warsaw, Edyta Wolska, Urszula Ślusarczyk. The exhibition was accompanied by Andrew Rzymkowski's concert and performances by Warsaw, Kamoji, Iwata and Glowacki.

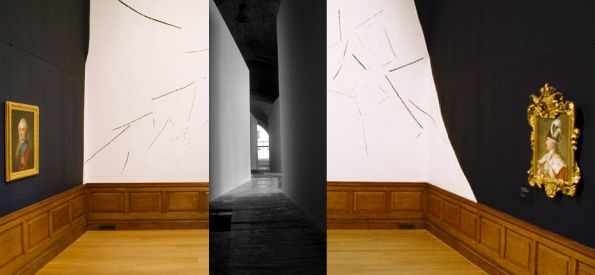
Polish Connection at Dulwich Picture Gallery, London, 2009.

=== The Polish Connection, Warsaw and London ===
The exhibition, The Polish Connection, which was part of the Polish-British project Polan!Year, took place simultaneously at Warsaw Royal Castle and Dulwich Picture Gallery in London in August and September 2009. Antoni Malinowski was inspired by the idea of King Stanisław August Poniatowski and created a collection of images of Warsaw that was a conceptual space-time bridge between the past and the present. For Dulwich Picture Gallery in London he prepared an installation from images of Polish kings, and in Warsaw Royal Castle the installation consisted of painted objects. At the end of the exhibition, Ruly Lenski did an audio performance based on a Martin Crimp text .

=== Other exhibitions ===
The foundation took part in the Miami Art Fair in 2011, exhibiting conceptual works from the ’60s of several artists (Józef Robakowski, Zygmunt Rytka, Ryszard Piegza) and organised a few performances (Ryszard Piegza, Mariusz Tarkawian, Janusz Bałdyga). It also sponsored an Zygmunt Rytka and Józef Robakowski exhibition in Lisbon in 2006 and an Abraham Ravett exhibition in Sokolovsko in 2010.
