= Barszczewski =

Barszczewski (feminine: Barszczewska; plural: Barszczewscy) is a Polish surname. Notable people with the surname include:

- Elżbieta Barszczewska (1913–1987), Polish actress
- Jan Barszczewski (1797–1851), Polish and Belarusian writer
- Leon Barszczewski (1849–1910), Polish soldier and naturalist

== See also ==
- Mikhail Barshchevsky (born 1955), Russian jurist
