= Statue of Filuś =

Statue in Toruń, Poland

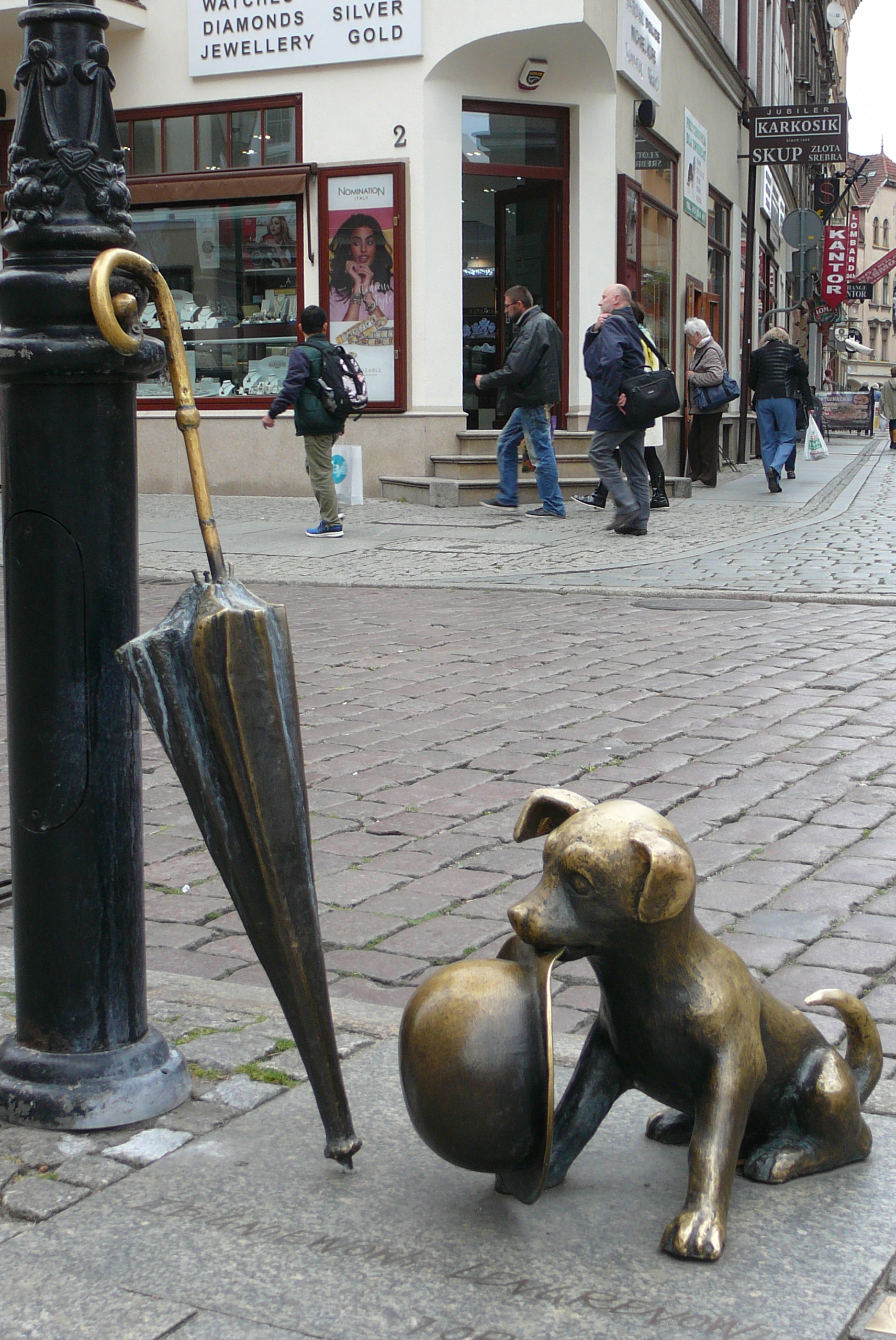
- The statue in 2018.
- Interactive map of Statue of Filuś
- Location: Chełmińska Street, Old Town, Toruń, Poland
- Coordinates: 53.011074°N 18.604510°E
- Designer: Zbigniew Mikielewicz
- Type: Statue
- Material: Bronze
- Opening date: 2 February 2005

The statue of Filuś (Polish pronunciation: [ˈfi.luɕ]; Polish: Pomnik Filusia) is a bronze sculpture in Toruń, Poland, placed on Chełmińska Street, near the Old Town Market Square, within the neighbourhood of Old Town. It depicts Filuś, a fictional dog from the comic series Profesor Filutek i jego piesek (lit. 'Professor Filutek and His Little Dog'), created by Zbigniew Lengren and published in news magazine Przekrój from 1946 to 2003. The statue was designed by Zbigniew Mikielewicz and unveiled on 2 February 2005.

== History ==
The bronze sculpture was designed by Zbigniew Mikielewicz. It depicts Filuś, a small fictional dog from the comic series Profesor Filutek i jego piesek (lit. 'Professor Filutek and His Little Dog'), created by Zbigniew Lengren and published in news magazine Przekrój from 1946 to 2003. It was unveiled on 2 February 2005 in Toruń, the hometown of Lengren, in the anniversary of his 86th birthday.

Every 1 April a small festivities are held around the statue, known as the Filuś Day. Its organised to celebrate author of the comic series, Zbigniew Lengren on his name day.

== Description ==
The sculpture is made from bronze and depicts a small live-sized dog, meant to symbolize Filuś, a fictional character from the comic series Profesor Filutek i jego piesek (lit. 'Professor Filutek and His Little Dog') by Zbigniew Lengren. The dog holds his owner's bowler hat in his mouth, being around half of the size of his body. The statue is placed next to a lamp post, with a bronze sculpture of an umbrella leaned on it. A pavement in front of the statue features the inscription in Polish, which reads "Zbigniewowi Lengrenowi; Torunianie". It translates to "To Zbigniew Lengren; the residents of Toruń".

== Gallery ==
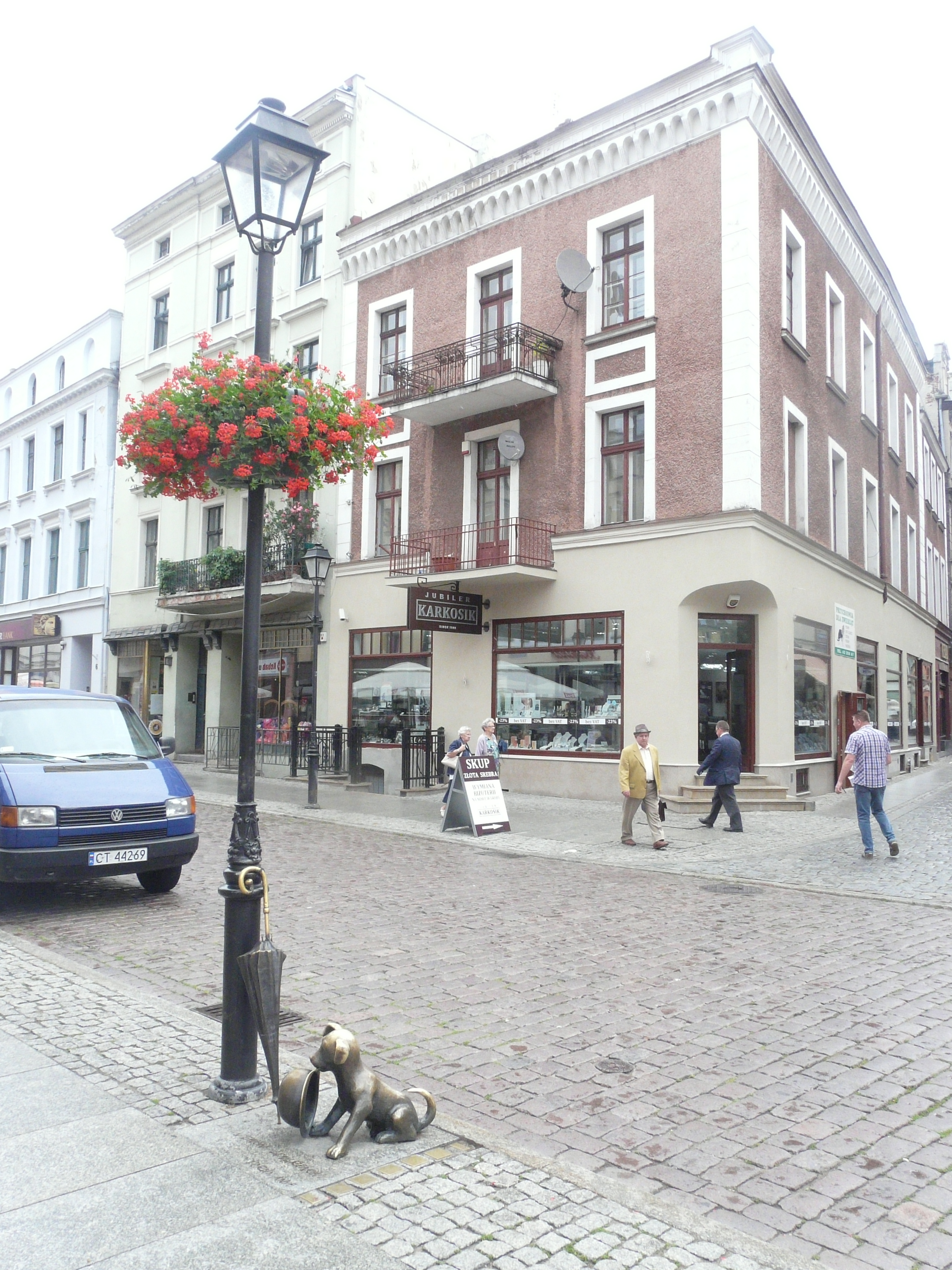
The statue next to a street lamp.
