= Marian Eile =

Polish journalist and artist (1910–1984)

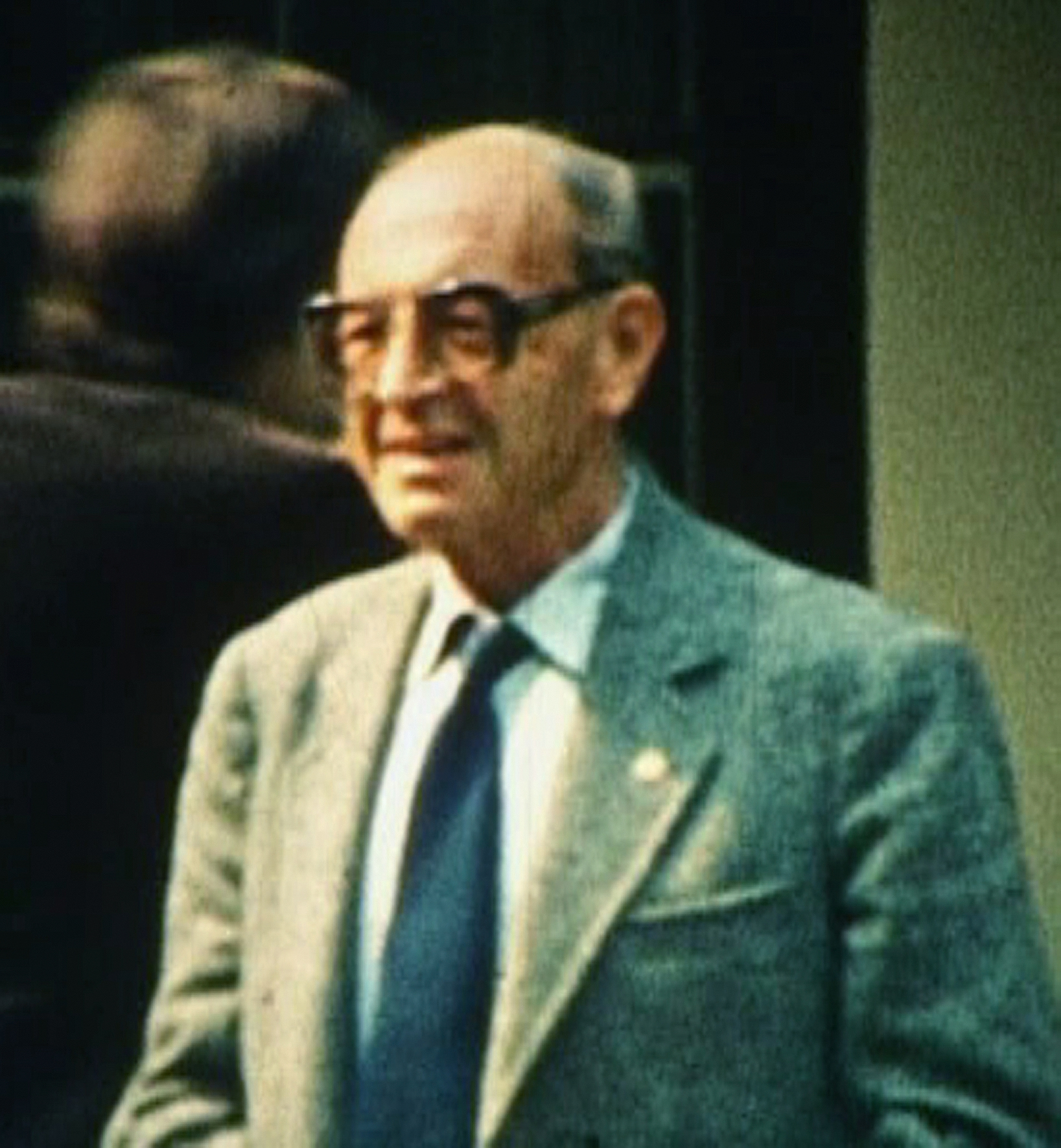
- Marian Eile, 1980
- Born: 7 January 1910; Lviv
- Died: 2 December 1984 (aged 74); Kraków
- Occupation: Journalist

Marian Eile (7 January 1910 – 2 December 1984) was a journalist and graphic artist, editor-in-chief of Przekrój from 1945 to 1969.

== Biography ==
He was the son of Henryk Eile and Czesława. From 1935 to 1939 he worked in Wiadomości Literackie.

== Awards ==
- Gold Cross of Merit (1952)
- Medal of the 10th Anniversary of People's Poland (1954)
- Knight's Cross of the Order of Polonia Restituta (1961)

== Bibliography ==
- Potkaj, Tomasz (2019). Przekrój Eilego. Biografia całego tego zamieszania z uwzględnieniem psa Fafika. Kraków: Mando. ISBN 978-83-277-1719-1.
- Potocka, Maria Anna; Sachar, Agnieszka (2020). Marian Eile. Artysta i redaktor. Muzeum Sztuki Współczesnej w Krakowie MOCAK. ISBN 9788365851413.
- Urbanek, Mariusz (2023). Marian Eile. Poczciwy cynik z „Przekroju”. Wydawnictwo Iskry. ISBN 978-83-244-1153-5.
