= Roman Loranc =

Photographer

- Born: Poland
- Occupation: Photographer
- Website: romanloranc.com

Roman Loranc is a traditional black-and-white photographer from Poland.

== Early life ==
Roman Loranc was born near Bielsko-Biala and lived in Poland during the communist era. When he was 26 years old, he immigrated to Madison, Wisconsin. He now resides in Northern California. He began his journey as an artist in the 1960s when his godparents gave him a 35mm format Druch camera as a first communion gift. The camera broke not long afterwards but did not fail to draw Loranc to photography.

== Environmental awareness ==
Roman Loranc's landscape photographs focus on environmental changes in California, such as the disappearance of wetlands. In an interview with Black and White magazine, he hopes people will help to protect and preserve the landscape and habitat for endangered wildlife.

== Photographic technique ==
Loranc uses a 4x5 Linhof field camera. He produces silver gelatin prints, and spots and mounts each print himself. Loranc first learned by doing things on his own without books or the technical manuals. Photography history books allowed Loranc to begin processing films and printing negatives". He now teaches photography workshops at his studio located near Mount Shasta.

== Works ==
A few of Roman Loranc's notable works are Private Road with Clouds, Two Hearted Oak, Absolution and Billowing Clouds over Bay Bridge. Loranc's first solo book, Two Hearted Oak, was released in 2003 and focuses primarily on images of the wetlands in California's Central Valley. His second book, Fractal Dreams, is a collection from his travels through Europe and around California.

=== Photographic books ===
- Traces, 2018. Poems by Robert Lax, Essay by Anthony Bannon, published by Roman Loranc Photography Studio
- Absolution; Fifty Photographs from Europe, 2013, Poem by Pablo Neruda, Essay by Anthony Bannon, published by Photography West Graphics, Inc.
- Fractal Dreams; Photographs from Two Decades, 2009, published by Photography West Graphics, Inc.
- Two Hearted Oak, The Photography of Roman Loranc, 2003, published by Heyday Books, Berkeley.

== Awards ==
- 2014, Carnegie Arts Center Distinguished Artist.
- 2013, Absolution: Fifty Photographs from Europe received the prestigious United States Literary Award in the category of Fine Art Photography.
