= Mariusz Hermanowicz =

- Born: 17 December 1950; Olsztyn, Poland
- Died: 3 October 2008 (aged 57); Olivet, France
- Education: National Film School in Łódź, Poland
- Known for: Photography

Mariusz Hermanowicz (17 December 1950 – 3 October 2008) was a Polish-French photographer. He was known for his ironic style documenting Poland of the communist years.

== Youth ==
Mariusz Hermanowicz was born in 1950 Olsztyn, Poland, in the family which has been moved there from Wilno today's Vilnius under the Yalta agreements adjoining this part of historic Lithuania and populated mainly by the Polish population, to the Soviet Union.

Fascinated from the young age by film and photography, Hermanowicz went to study at the Cinematography Dept. of the National Polish Film School in Łódź (Master of Arts, 1974).

== Recognized as a photographer ==
While working as a cinematographer directly after his film studies he continued to take pictures, winning the most important Polish photographic competition "Gold Jantar" at Gdańsk in 1977 and in 1978 he was admitted to the elitist ZPAF (Union of Polish Artists Photographers).

== Emigration ==
Hermanowicz always refused to serve Polish communist authorities of the time as their propaganda worker and after the Martial Law has been declared, he decided to leave Poland. As his mother had dual nationality Polish and French, in 1982 he managed to travel to the Netherlands, where he obtained all the necessary documents to settle with his wife and son Miłosz Hermanowicz in France.

== Work in France ==
Since 1983, Hermanowicz not neglecting his original artistic work, has been working for the French Ministry of Culture - in different French cities - Strasbourg, Poitiers, and finally since 1990 at Orléans, as a photographer documenting monuments of art and architecture in the provincial France.

== Death and legacy ==
Hermanowicz died in Olivet near Orléans on 3 October 2008. He left thousands of unusual photographs.

He also made photograph documenting the old city of Wilno (now Vilnius, Lithuania), he documented victims of the Martial Law in Communist Poland 1981-1983, he made during his life hundreds of portraits of important people of Polish culture, and during last years he made portraits of women, he also left numerous original series of photographs being combination of a simple but original text, unusually connected with photographs.

Hermanowicz' photographs are in the collection of the Pompidou Centre in Paris ("Le Vieil appareil (Old camera)" series); Contemporary Art Museum in Łódź, Poland (76 works); the National Museum in Wrocław, Poland; and in the Centre for Contemporary Art in Ujazdowski Castle in Warsaw.

== Sources ==
- Photographers Encyclopaedia International 1839 to the present/ In: Editions Camera Obscura, Switzerland. 1985.
- Urszula Czartoryska,Time intensified. Ten photographers on their path of time, Polish Perception. Ten contemporary photographers 1977-85
- Jerzy Lewczyński / In: Anthology of Polish Photography 1839-1989 ed. Lucrum, 1999.
- Marek Grygiel, Catalog of exhibition of photographs by Mariusz Hermanowicz "Denudation", July 2004.
