= Tomasz Sobecki =

Polish sculptor, painter, and theatre set designer

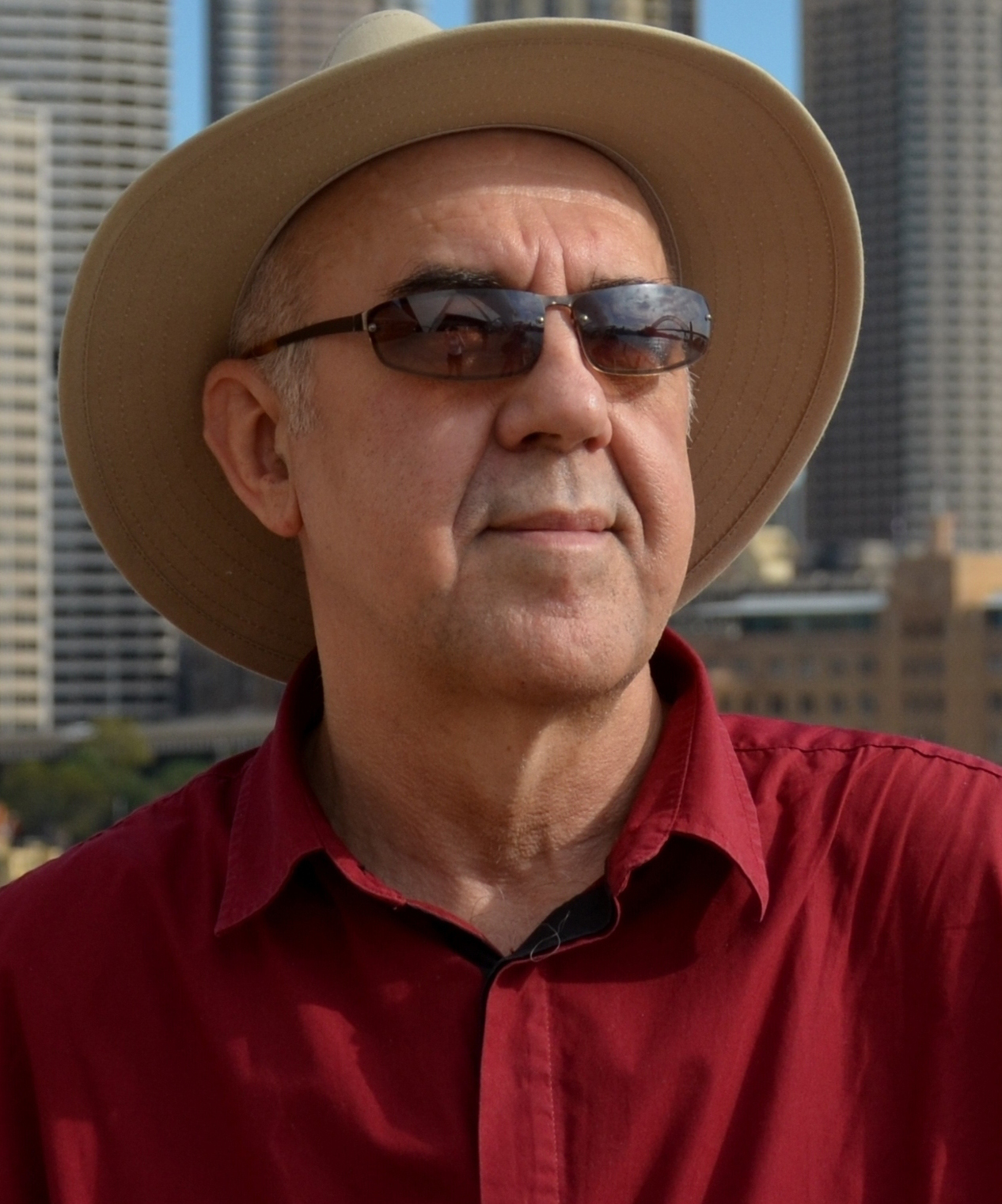
- Known for: Photographer

Tomasz Sobecki is a Polish fine art photographer.

== Biography ==
He graduated from the mathematics and physics program at Tadeusz Kościuszko Secondary School No. 4 in Toruń in 1971 and earned a master’s degree from Nicolaus Copernicus University in 1977. In 2013, Sobecki defended his doctoral dissertation The Idea of Pyramids, earning the degree of doctor of art in photography at the Łódź Film School.

During his studies, Sobecki pursued mountaineering in the Tatra Mountains, the French Alps, and the Hindu Kush, as well as interests in natural sciences, particularly geomorphology. He was also involved in independent intellectual life during the communist era through the Jesuit Academic Pastoral Ministry in Toruń, participating in lectures associated with the “Flying University” movement.

Since the mid-1980s, Sobecki has participated in numerous national and international photography symposia and exhibitions, including events organized by ZPAF, Ars Baltica, and international academic institutions in Europe and India. From 1990 to 2013, he was a member of the Association of Polish Artists and Designers (ZPAP PSU), where he co-founded the IDEA Advertising Publishers Competition and curated the European Design Annual EDA’98 exhibition in Toruń.

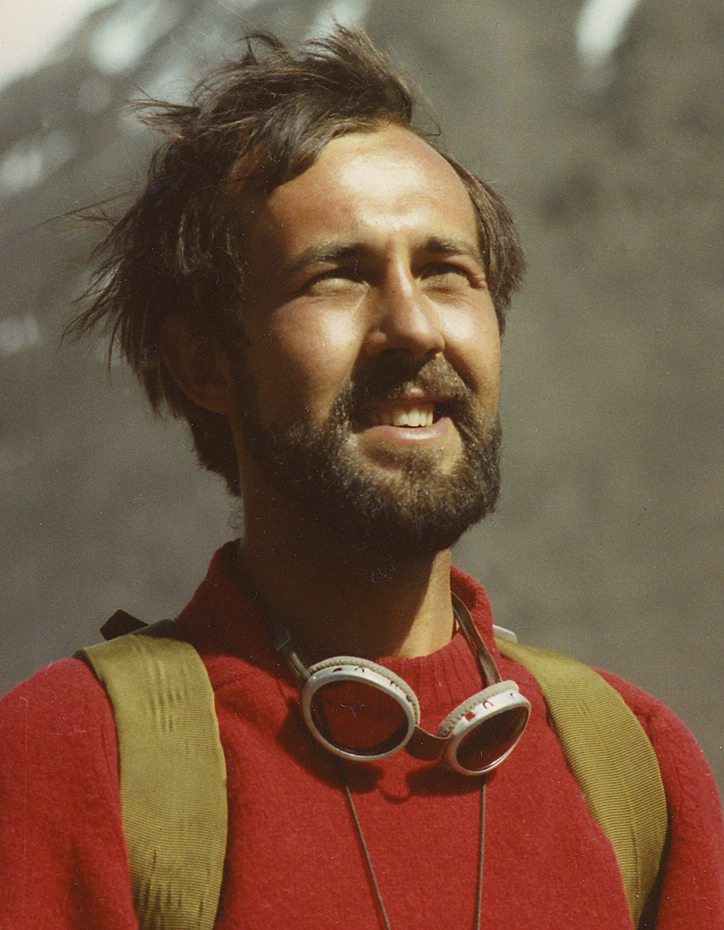
Tomasz Sobecki - Hindu Kush

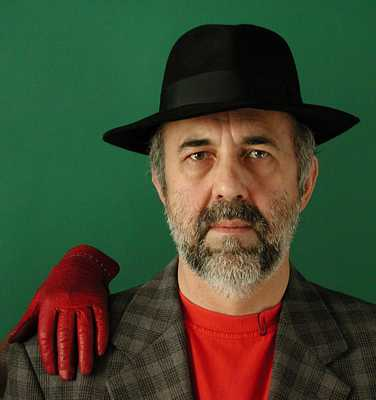
Tomasz Sobecki (portret)

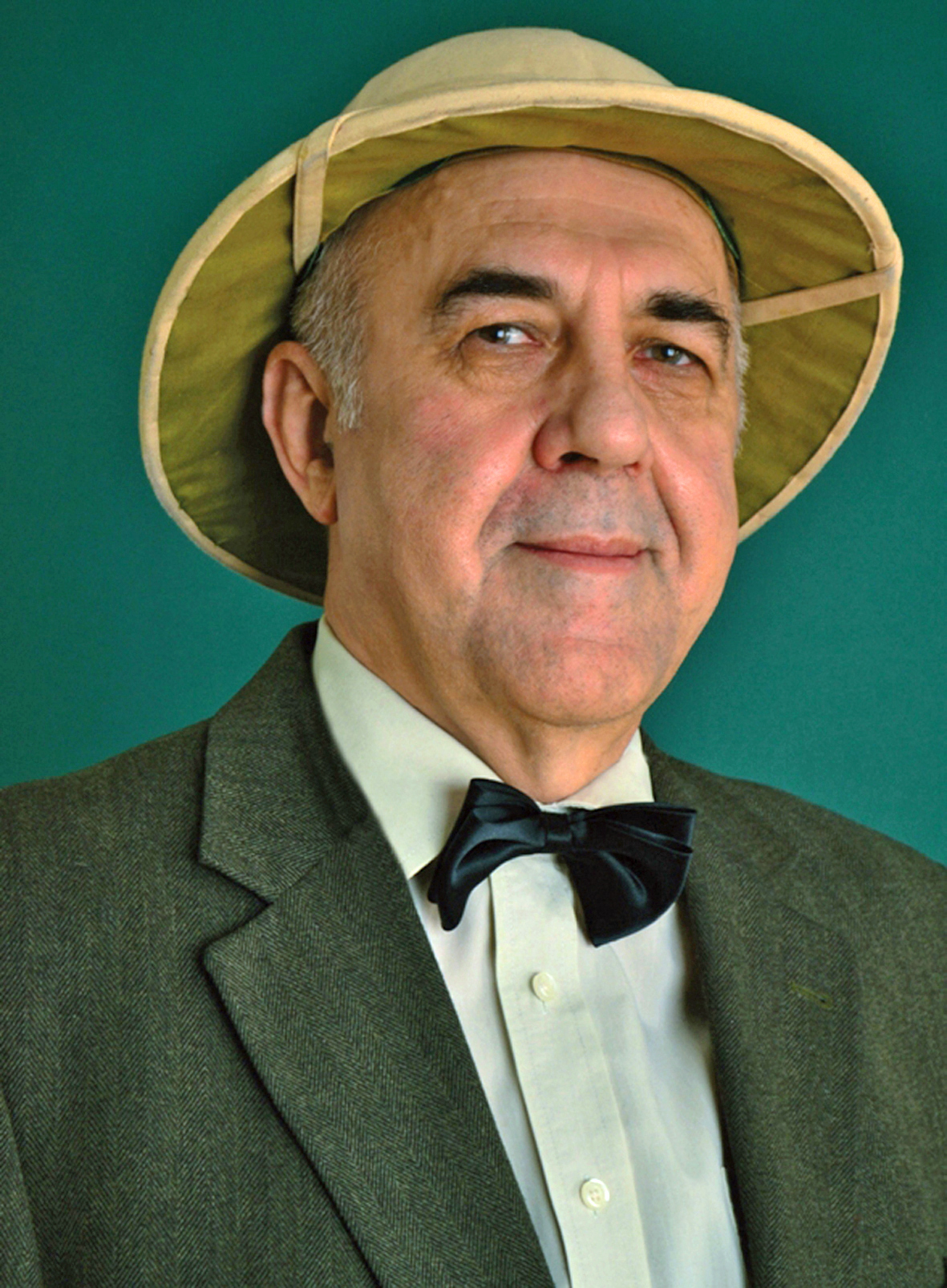
Tomasz Sobecki 2014

== Academic career ==
He has given lectures, as an assistant professor, at various times and in various forms, about photography for culture experts and journalists at universities: Nicolaus Copernicus University in Toruń, University of Łódź – also in English, Kazimierz Wielki University in Bydgoszcz, as well as for the students of the Academy of Photography in Bydgoszcz, and fine art photography lectures at the Department of Graphic Arts ASP in Gdańsk.

In 2015 he was invited as a visiting professor by the Department of Design at the Indian Institute of Technology in Hyderabad (India), where he held photography lectures for students of the Department of Design and the university-wide group.
