= Joanna Salska =

- Born: Joanna Salska
- Education: Warsaw Academy of Fine Arts
- Known for: Painting, drawing
- Movement: Alterrealism
- Awards: Visual Artists Fellowship, the Ministry of Arts & Culture, Warsaw, Poland
- Website: http://ubaowl.com/

Joanna Salska, also working under the pseudonym Uba Owl, is a Polish-American visual artist known for her fine art gallery paintings and for founding the interdisciplinary art movement, Alterrealism. She currently works out of Berkeley, California.

Salska initially came to the United States in 1982, funded by a Yaddo Foundation grant.

Joanna Salska was one of 14 US artists chosen for the 4th Beijing International Art Biennale, 2010, taking place at the Beijing National Art Museum. She has exhibited widely in galleries and museums and throughout US, Europe and Asia.

== Alterrealism ==
Joanna Salska as Uba Owl has created a foundation of a new artistic direction which she calls "Alterrealism.” It is an interdisciplinary movement connecting arts and sciences. The main purpose of Alterrealism is to describe a hidden reality in a world dominated and determined by new mass media.
