= Jacenty Dędek =

Polish photographer

Jacenty Dędek (born 2 July 1966 in Częstochowa, Poland) is a Polish photographer.

== Career ==
From 1992 to 2001 Dędek was a full-time press photographer for the local newspapers Życie Częstochowy, Dziennik 24 Godziny and Dziennik Zachodni. Now he works freelance cooperating with National Geographic Poland, Voyage, Polityka, Przegląd and Wiedza i Życie. His photos are objective documents, though they are not void of elements of mood or lyrical undertones. Jacenty Dędek is also engaged in portrait and news photographing.

Jacenty Dędek's photos have been published in album editions such as: Częstochowa for Everybody (1999), Great Water (1998), Richard Mamis: Daimonion (2000), Częstochowa Calendarium (2001), Tomasz Sętowski: Museum of Imagination (2003), Poland (2003) and in New Europe, a special edition by National Geographic Poland.

== Awards and exhibitions ==
Jacenty Dędek was the winner of the Polish Press Photography 1998, for his picture story The world within reach of your hand - a photo-essay about a blind woman bringing up her daughter and of the I and III Jurassic Photography Salons.

He organized one-person exhibitions: Children of Częstochowa, On the Side of the Trail, The Beauty of Częstochowa Landscape and participated in national events: Polish Press Photography 1998 and 2000, or Great Photographic Exhibition organized by National Geographic Poland.
