= Józef Bury =

Polish artist

Jozef Bury (born 1961 in Mielec, Poland, lives and works in Paris) is a multidisciplinary artist who articulates researches about space-and-time problems, polysensory perception, subcognitive attitude and memory of experience. While working with such mediums as photograph, painting, performance and new media.

== Bibliography ==
- "Cyberspace and the Local Illusion — Working notes, 1992–2005 ", in : Sobieszczanski, M., Lacroix, C., (dir.), From split-screen to multi-screen. The spatially distributed video-cinematic narration. Peter Lang, 2010
- Interfejs Interface, Katowice : BWA Contemporary Art Gallery 2008
- "Chronoscopie" in : Costantini, M. (dir.) Ecce Femina, Paris : Harmattan 2007
- "La photographie à l'épreuve", id : "De la vidéo aux arts performatifs", in : Frontisi C. (dir.), Histoire visuelle de l'art, Paris : Larousse 2005
- Art subcognitif, Katowice: BWA Contemporary Art Gallery 2004
- "Tropologie de l'espace – notes de travail 1992–1997" in : Sobieszczanski, M., Lacroix, C. (dir.) Spatialisation en art et sciences humaines, Paris : Peeters Publishers 2004
- "Sur la peinture" in : MANIF Seoul 2002, Seoul : Seoul Arts Center 2002
