= Anthony Bannon =

American museum director (born 1943)

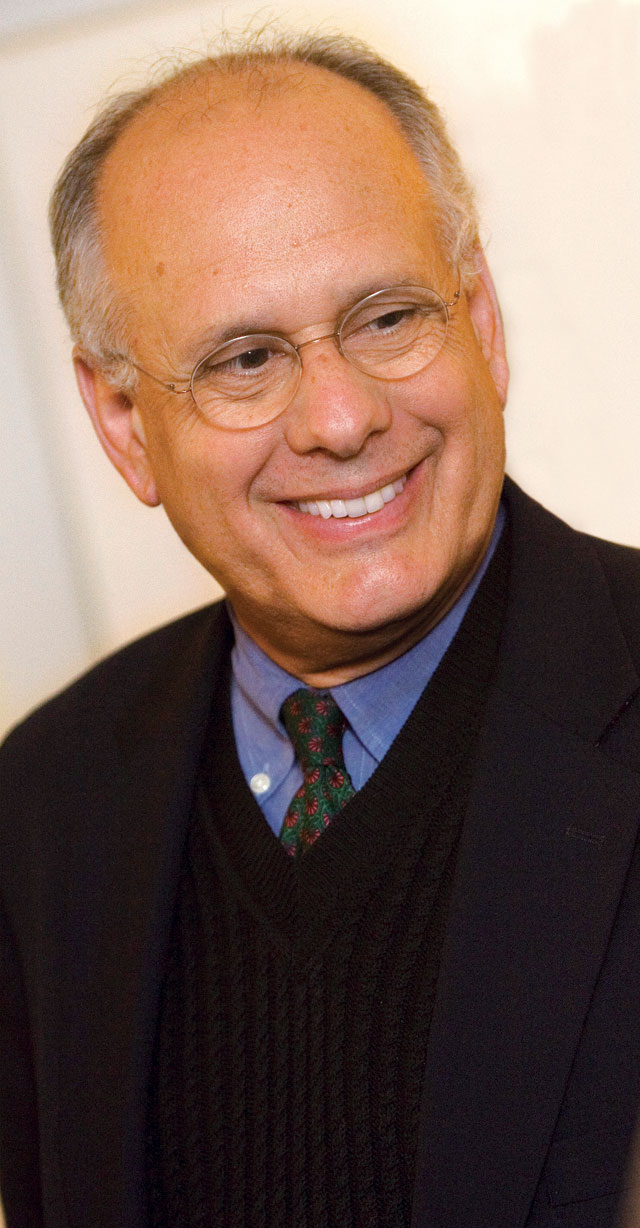
- Born: December 6, 1942 (age 83); Hanover, New Hampshire, U.S.
- Occupation: Arts

Academic background
- Education: St. Bonaventure University; State University of New York at Buffalo
- Thesis: Robert Longo: A Practice of Art

Anthony Bannon (born December 6, 1943) is an arts administrator in Western New York. He was the director of the George Eastman Museum from 1996 to 2012 and the executive director of the Burchfield Penney Art Center at Buffalo State College. During his tenure at the George Eastman Museum, Bannon launched programs in photo and film preservation, acquired the Technicolor and Merchant Ivory Productions archives, and established an online presence for the museum's classic images.

Bannon has lectured at museums, colleges, and festivals. He is chairman of the Lucie Awards/International Photography Awards and was awarded the Golden Career Award in 2007 by the FOTOfusion Festival of Photography & Digital Imaging for his "far-reaching leadership and scholarship in the cultural community".

== Biography ==
=== Education ===
Bannon studied biology at St. Bonaventure University, earning a bachelor's degree in 1964. He earned a master's degree in English, with a concentration in criticism and film in the Center for Media Study, from the State University of New York at Buffalo in 1976.

Bannon earned his Ph.D. in 1994 from the State University of New York at Buffalo from the English Department, with a concentration in Culture Studies. His thesis was titled Robert Longo: A Practice of Art.

=== Director of the George Eastman Museum ===
Bannon was director of the George Eastman Museum from 1996 to 2012. His tenure as director saw some of the most popular exhibitions in the museums history. He also initiated the digitisation of the collection.

== Early career ==
Bannon began his career as a journalist, working from 1966 to 1985 for The Buffalo News, a metropolitan daily with a peak circulation of more than 400,000. He was at first initially a theater and dance critic, and a critic fellow at the Eugene O'Neill Memorial Theater Foundation and the American Dance Congress in 1969. Bannon was later the newspaper's film, video, and architecture critic, finally concentrating on the fine and camera arts from 1977 through 1985. When a Sunday edition was initiated in 1977, he was appointed its art section editor.

For the next decade, from 1985 to 1996, Bannon worked for the State University of New York College at Buffalo. He was director of the Burchfield-Penney Art Center, which is dedicated to the work and archives of Charles Burchfield (1893–1967), a watercolorist. It is also as a regional museum, collecting art, craft and design by artists who have lived in Western New York State.

Bannon held the position of the college's assistant vice president and director for cultural affairs from 1994 to 1996.

Bannon's teaching experience has included adjunct positions at Sierra Nevada College in Nevada; State University of New York College at Buffalo; Empire State College in Buffalo; and Rochester Institute of Technology.

== Personal ==
Bannon was born in Hanover, New Hampshire, where his father, Dr. Robert Bannon, was a professor of physiological optics and a member of the Dartmouth Eye Institute, and his mother, Frances, was a nurse at Hitchcock Memorial Hospital.

== Awards and grants ==
- CEO of the Year, Public Relations Society of America, Rochester Chapter, 2008
- Golden Career Award, FOTOfusion Festival of Photography & Digital Imaging, 2007
- Outstanding Art Administrator of the Year, The Buffalo Partnership (Chamber of Commerce) and the Arts Council of Buffalo & Erie County, 1995

== Publications ==
- Hiroshi Watanabe: Findings, 2007 Critical Mass/Photolucida
- Warheads: Photographs by Diane Bush, 2006 KuDaEditions, USA
- Picturing Eden, Introduction, 2005 Steidl, Germany
- Steve McCurry (Phaidon 55s), 2005 Phaidon Press, London, United Kingdom
- Ansel Adams, 2003 Fundación Pedro Barrié de al Maza, A Coruña, Spain
- Arcadia Revisited: Photographs by John Pfahl, 1988, with Estelle Jussim University of New Mexico Press
- Grace Woodworth: Photographer Outside the Common Lines, 1984, with Mary Stanley Schweinfurth Memorial Art Center, Auburn, New York
- The Taking of Niagara: A History of the Falls in Photography, 1982 Media Study/Buffalo, New York
- The Photo-Pictorialists of Buffalo, 1981 Media Study/Buffalo with the Albright-Knox Art Gallery, Buffalo, New York
