= Zbigniew Lengren =

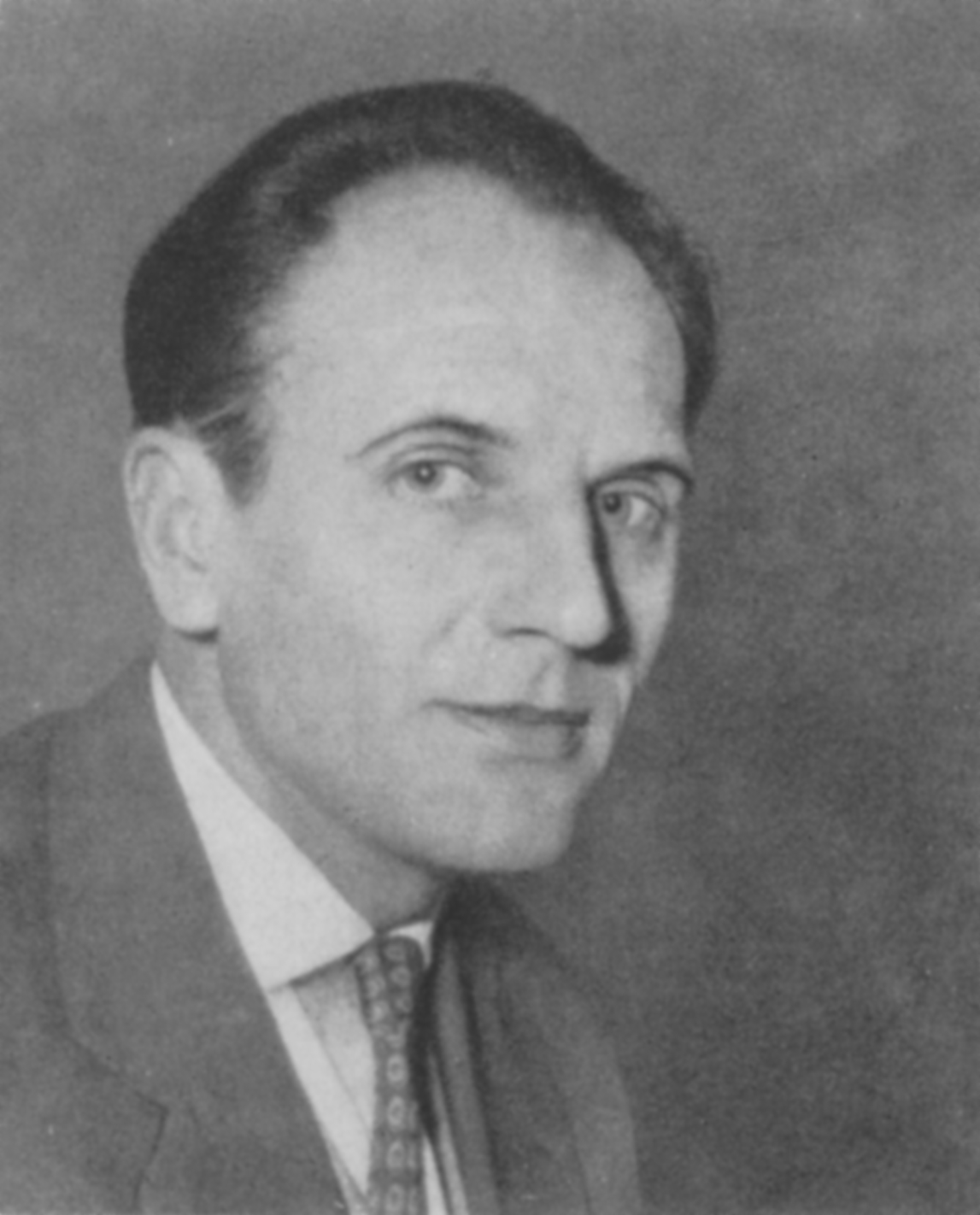
Zbigniew Lengren (before 1965)

Zbigniew Lengren (2 February 1919 in Tula – 1 October 2003 in Warsaw) was a Polish cartoonist, caricaturist, and illustrator. He was awarded the "Order of the Smile", among other awards. His most famous creation is Professor Filutek, who appeared once a week on the last page of Przekrój magazine, together with his dog Filuś, for over 50 years, a record run in Polish comics. Lengren was also a writer, especially of poems for children.

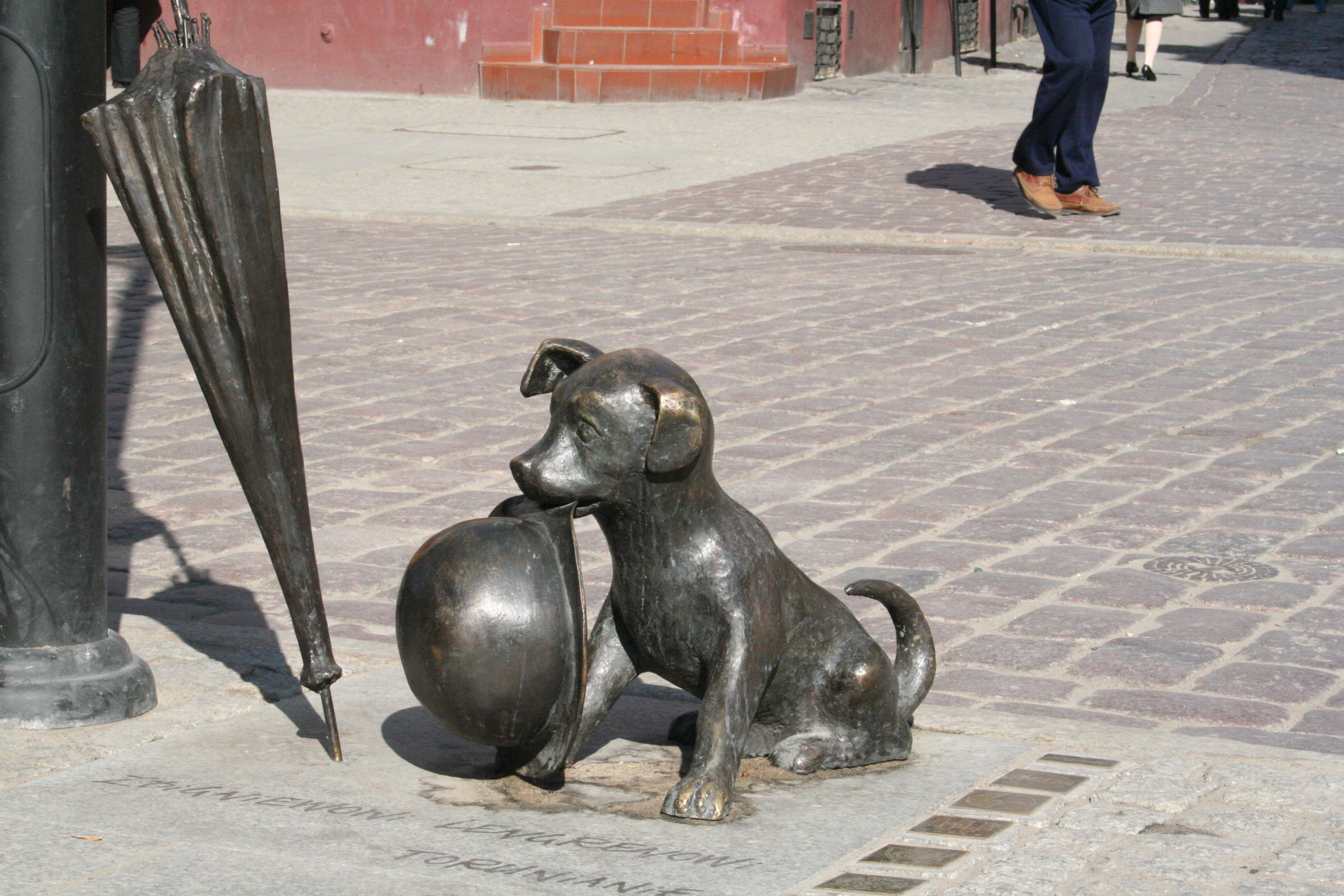
Statue of Filuś guarding his master's belongings at the Old Town Market in Toruń, Poland

In 1947, while a Fine Arts student of the Nicolaus Copernicus University, he won a competition to design the Super Ex Libris for the University Library. The design is still in use today.

== Filmography ==
Lengren co-authored several animated and feature films.

- Profesor Filutek w parku 1955 screenplay an artistic design (Note: PROFESOR FILUTEK W PARKU)
- Tajemnica starego zamku, 1956, screenplay and artistic design (Note: TAJEMNICA STAREGO ZAMKU)
- Dziwny sen profesora Filutka 1956 screenplay (Note: Dziwny sen profesora Filutka)
- "Zryw" na spływ 1956 (Note: "ZRYW" NA SPŁYW)
- Pojedynek profesora Filutka 1956 screenplay (Note: POJEDYNEK PROFESORA FILUTKA)
- Murzynek 1960, set design (Note: MURZYNEK)
- Morderstwo wieczorową porą, 1960, TV play, director (Note: MORDERSTWO WIECZOROWĄ PORĄ)
- ...A krawcy niech będą krawcami 1961, artistic design (Note: ...A KRAWCY NIECH BĘDĄ KRAWCAMI)
- O małej Kasi i dużym wilku 1963 (Note: O MAŁEJ KASI I O DUŻYM WILKU)

== Awards and decorations ==
- 1977: Order of the Smile
- 1955:Golden Cross of Merit
