= Wojciech Plewiński =

Polish photographer (born 1928)

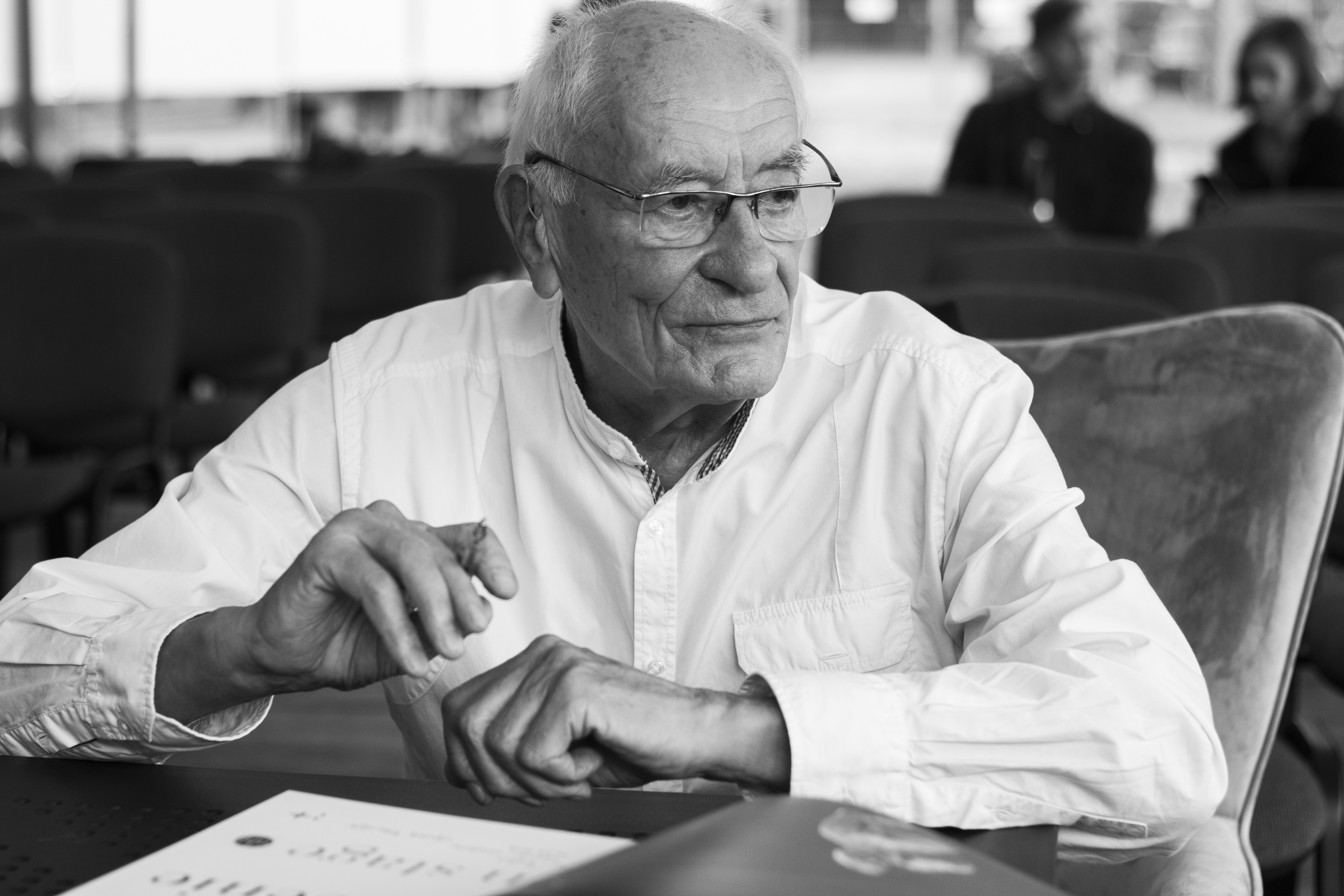
- Wojciech Plewiński (2018)
- Born: 31 August 1928; Warsaw
- Citizenship: Polish
- Education: Kraków Polytechnic
- Occupation: photographer

Wojciech Plewiński (born 31 August 1928) is a Polish photographer. His photos were published on over five hundred „Przekrój” magazine covers. He is a member of FIAP and ZPAF.

== Biography ==
He has been taking pictures for Polish theatres, including: Theater Scena STU, Ludowy Theatre and Juliusz Słowacki Theatre. He was also connected with Piwnica pod Baranami. Lives in Kraków today. Known for his 'kitten' photographs of women in the popular Przekrój weekly in the 1960s, as well as his celebrity portraits, reportages, artistic nudes and magazine covers.

Wojciech Plewiński's academic background was founded in architecture - in 1955 he received his diploma from the Kraków Polytechnic University. He studied sculpture at the Kraków Academy of Fine Arts, but photography quickly became his passion and he abandoned all other undertakings. He began taking photographs in late 1956. Barbara Hoff from the Przekrój weekly, who later became a famous fashion designer, engaged him as a photographer with the magazine and he continued to work with the magazine for over four decades. He managed to shoot nearly five hundred of the famous 'kitten' shots of beautiful girls for the front cover. A few years later he took up theatre photography. He ended up developing a long-lasting relationship with the Stary Teatr in Kraków but offers came knocking on his doors from all sides.

Throughout the years Plewiński shot nearly seven hundred plays. He also photographed musicians, authors, painters and reportages, sometimes in very close quarters, such as the Jazz Camping, 1959, a meeting of polish jazz musicians and fans. Documented are performances of Konrad Swinarski, Jerzy Jarocki, Andrzej Wajda, Jerzy Grzegorzewski and Krystian Lupa's opening staging. We see Zakopane's theatre, to which Plewiński was closely attached from the very beginning and the perverse couple Krzysztof Globisz and Anna Dymna in Gyubal Wahazar. He also made a recording of a unique happening by Tadeusz Kantor titled The Dividing Line, which made history in December 1965.

Among his photographs there are portraits of Zofia and Krzysztof Komeda in bed at Zakopane's guest house or the young Sławomir Mrożek with his head wrapped in curtains. He photographed people notable in Polish post-war culture.

Plewiński recalled the moment when he decided he wanted to be a photographer, while kayaking on vacation: "At the time kayaking was a fad and everyone was doing it, including the future pope. We kayaked with Jerzy Turowicz and with Jan Jozef Szczepanski and that's where I took these pictures. When I borrowed a Leica with an Elmar from a friend I was awfully proud, yet I barely knew how to put the film in. I shot two rolls, I picked out a few photos and I submitted them for a competition ran by PTTK and won every one of the available prizes. Some sort of a water canteen and a back pack. That raised my spirits. I realised that this made sense. Previously I would take part in kayaking and had my friend take photos. Not having a camera, I observed and helped him at night in a makeshift darkroom in a bathroom and there we developed tiny copies. When I saw them I thought to myself, "God, these pictures are horrendous! Why did he take them in such a way?" That's when the image of what we had gone through together, combined with the confrontation of the photographic effect embedded itself into my memory. This is also why during the next kayaking trip I went down with a Leica to face the challenge of this new and unknown issue. I made it happen. This was the trigger in my life and that's how it all happened."

The National Museum in Kraków hosted a retrospective of photographs by Wojciech Plewiński in the summer of 2011. That year, Plewiński's Przekrój covers were also one of the main themes in the documentary Political Dress, produced by the Adam Mickiewicz Institute.

In 1959 he appeared in Krzysztof Zanussi's short film Cement i słowa (The Cement and Words), which action was set in Nowa Huta.

Four documentary films about Wojciech Plewiński were made: Twarze (1966), Portret. Wojciech Plewiński (2000), Plewiński. Spojrzenia (2017) and Proszę nie siadać (2026).
