= Marek Szczęsny =

Polish painter (born 1939)

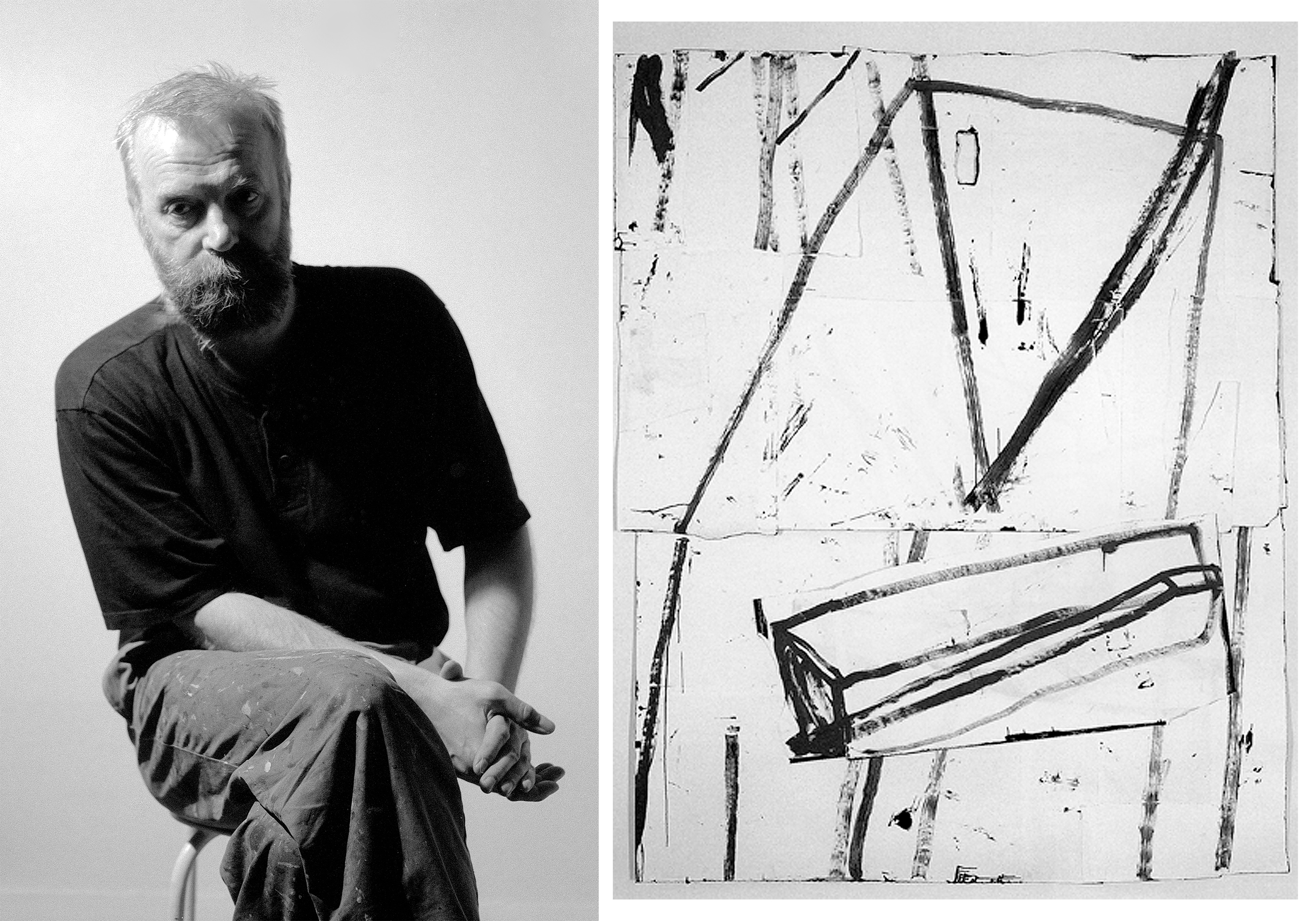
portrait,drawing Marek Szczęsny
- Born: 30 July 1939 (age 86); Radom, Poland
- Website: http://www.marekszczesny.com/

Marek Szczesny (born 1939) is a Polish-born contemporary painter known for his abstract and gestural approach to painting and mixed media. His work often explores the dynamics of surface, rupture, and reconstruction, incorporating materials such as canvas, paper, cardboard, and metal. Szczesny has participated in more than thirty solo and group exhibitions throughout Europe and the United States.

. . He currently lives and works in Paris.

== Early life ==
Marek Szczęsny was born in Radom, Poland, on 30 July 1939. Szczęsny was born in the year of the outbreak of WWII and spent his earlier life in occupied and post-war Poland.

Wanting to become an artist, Marek took private art lessons and in the late 1950s moved to Gdańsk, where he began attending lectures at the State Academy of Fine Arts in Gdańsk. In the 1960s he began associating with a group of artists from the Żak - a student cultural club in Gdańsk. During this time he met the Polish painter Tadeusz Brzozowski. In 1967 Szczęsny had his debut exhibition at Żak. Thanks to Brzozowski the commission at the Polish Ministry of Culture granted Szczęsny the status of artist and membership to the Association of Polish Visual Artists.

== Career ==
In the 1970s, Marek Szczęsny left Gdańsk and moved to Zakopane. For four years he was a member of the “GOPR” - the mountain rescue team specializing in winter rescue - in the Tatras, but continued to draw. Between 1970 and 1978 he exhibited his works in both group and solo exhibitions across Poland, Italy and Spain. It would be another 12 years before Szczęsny exhibited in Poland again (in 1991 as part of the group exhibition ‘Jesteśmy’ at Zachęta National Gallery of Art, Poland).

In 1978 Szczęsny left Poland for Paris and two years later was granted a Ford Foundation scholarship in 1980. At this time Szczęsny began to exhibit his work regularly in Europe.

From 2003 he had individual exhibitions in museums in France and Poland and was included in the exhibition “Polish Artists of the Twentieth Century” in France. In 2008 he had a solo exhibition entitled “Gravitation” at the Foksal Gallery in Warsaw. In 2016 in an exhibition titled “La Dechirure” at the Atlas Sztuki gallery in Łódź Szczęsny created a large wall sized installation using torn paper, cardboard and wood.

Between 1996 and 2008 Marek Szczęsny was awarded grants from the Pollock-Krasner Foundation and the Adolph and Esther Gottlieb Foundation in New York and the Bemis Center for Contemporary Art in Omaha, Nebraska. He was also an artist in residence at the Edward F. Albee Foundation in Montauk, New York.

Szczęsny has participated in exhibitions across France, Poland, Luxembourg, Switzerland, Italy, the US, Japan, Germany and Austria.

== Exhibitions ==
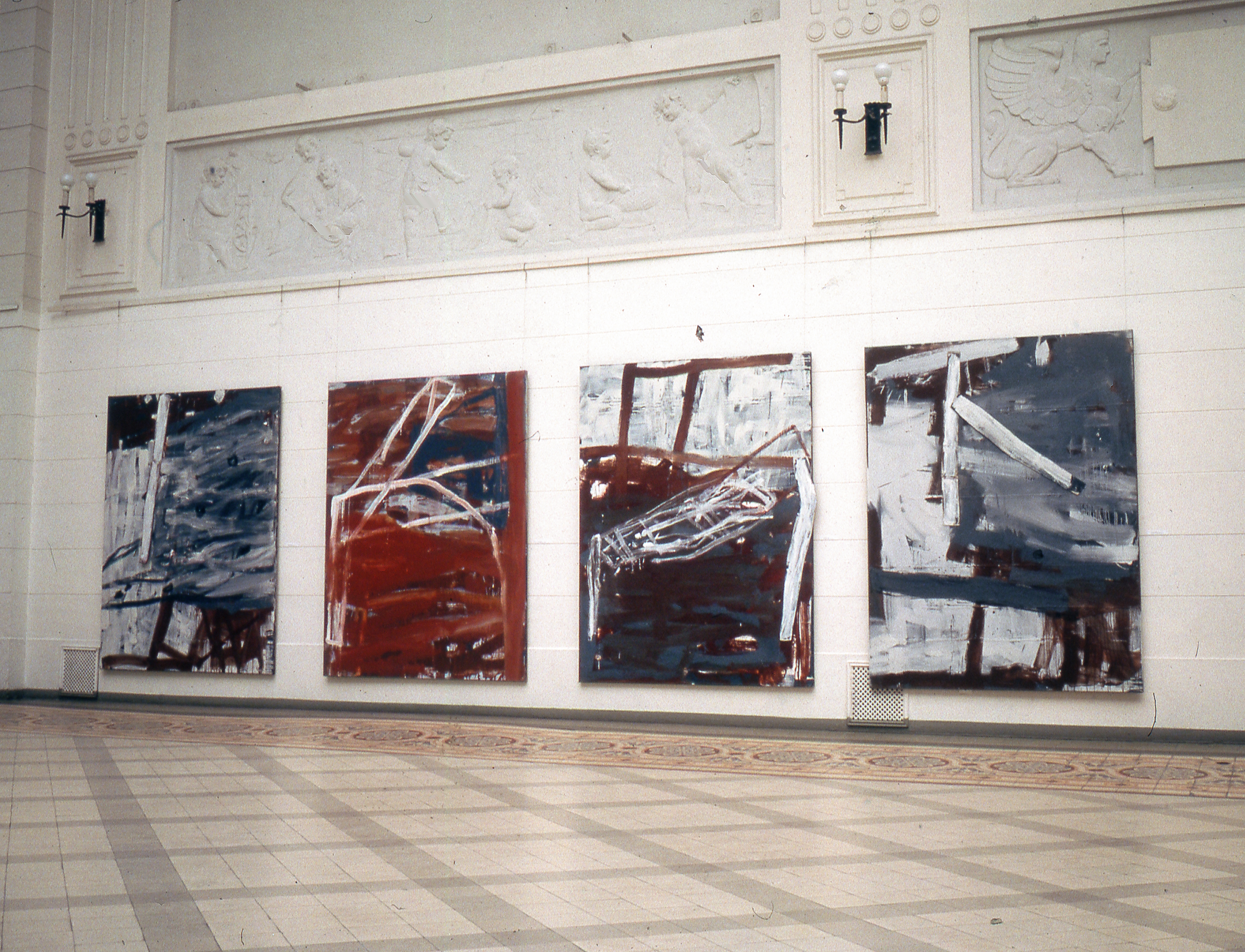
National Museum, Poznan

=== Solo exhibitions ===
- 2023 – Maison du Cygne, Centre d'Art, Six-Fours-les-Plages, France
- 2021 – Intranquillité, Galerie Dutko, Paris, France
- 2019 – Galerie Akie Arichi (with Aliska Lahusen), Paris, France
- 2017 – Galerie du Canon, Toulon, France
- 2016 – Atlas Sztuki Gallery, Łódź, Poland.
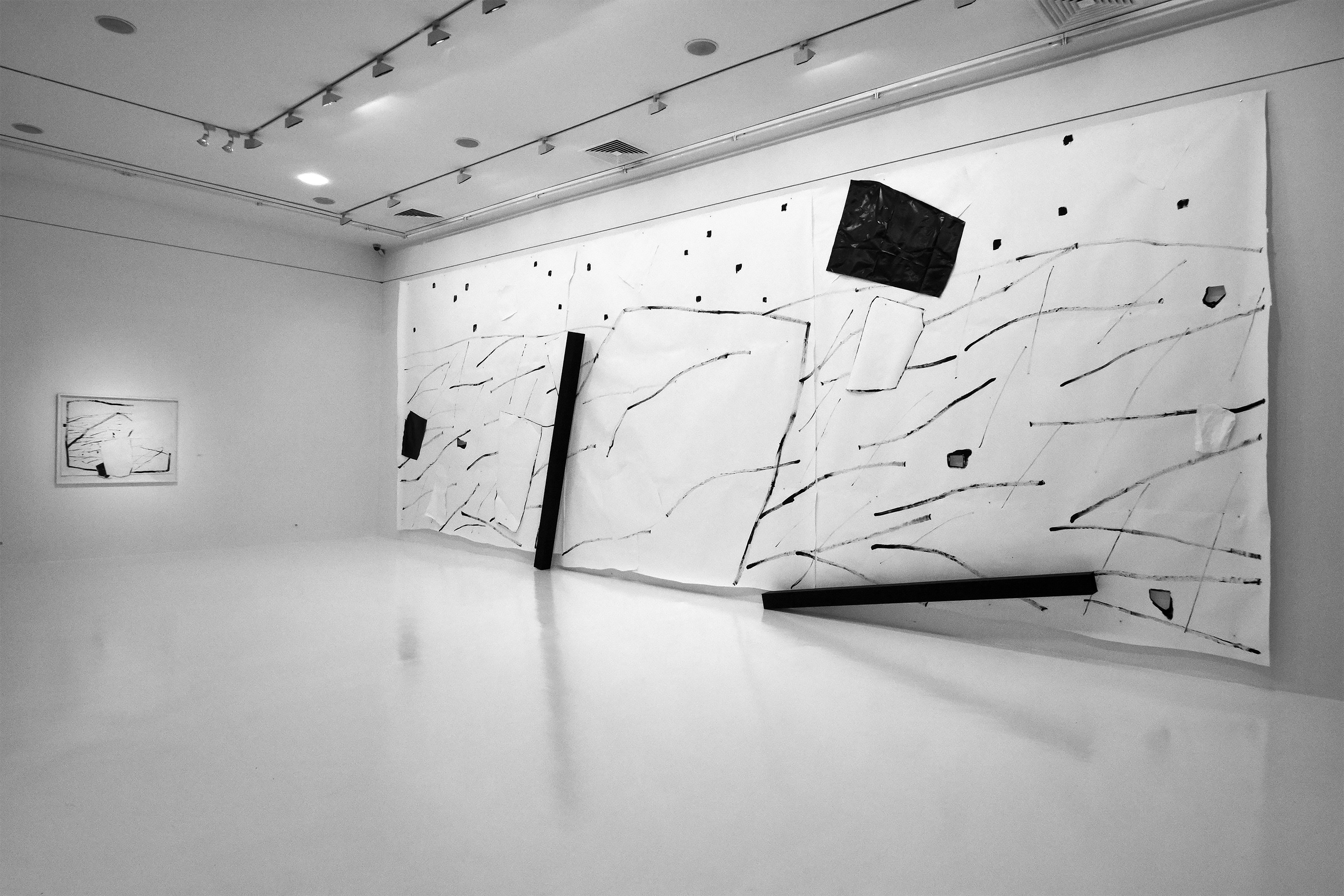
  Atlas Sztuki, Lodz
- 2016 – Akie Arichi Gallery, Paris, France
- 2015 – l’étrangère, London, United Kingdom
- 2009 – Hanna Muzalewska Gallery, Poznań, Poland
- 2008 – Gravity, Galeria Foksal, Warsaw, Poland
- 2005 – Municipal Gallery of Saint-Raphaël (with Jannis Kounellis), France
- 2004 – Centre d'Art Contemporain de la Méditerranée, Toulon, France
- 2003 – National Museum, Poznań, Poland.
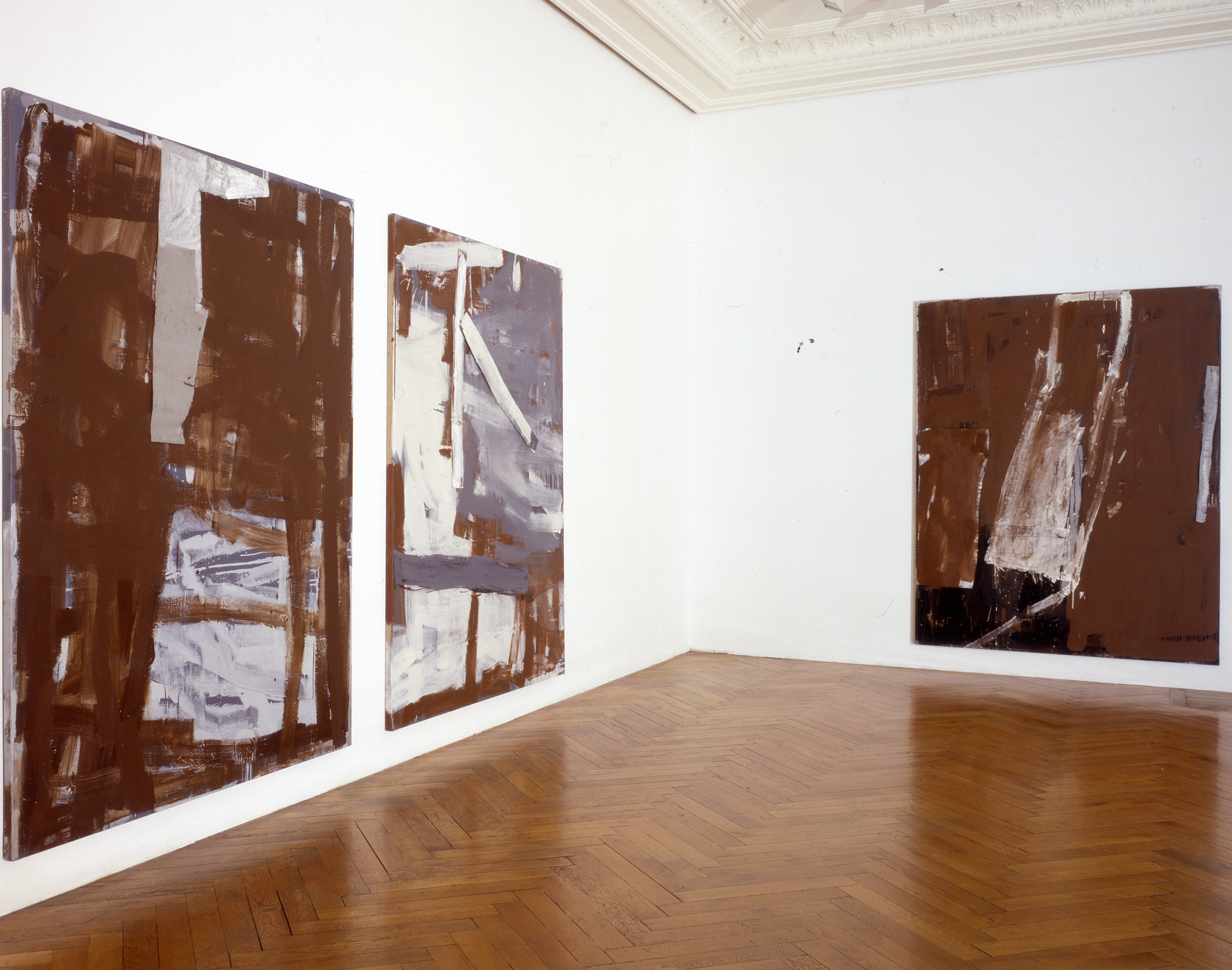
  Hotel des Arts, Toulon
- 2002 – Centre d'Art Contemporain de la Méditerranée, Toulon, France.
- 1999 – Akie Arichi Gallery, Paris, France
- 1998 – Askeo Gallery, Paris, France
- 1998 – Edouard Manet Municipal Gallery, Gennevilliers, France
- 1997 – Kordegarda Gallery, Warsaw, Poland
- 1997 – FIAC (Rosa Turetsky Gallery), Geneva, Switzerland
- 1996 – Emmanuel Carlebach Gallery, Paris, France
- 1995 – Rosa Turetsky Gallery, Geneva, Switzerland
- 1995 – Accatone Gallery, Paris, France
- 1994 – Accatone Gallery (part of Volker Schlöndorff Film Festival), Paris, France
- 1994 – Bureau of Art Exhibitions, Zakopane, Poland
- 1994 – FIAC (Rosa Turetsky Gallery), Paris, France
- 1994 – Emmanuel Carlebach Gallery, Paris, France
- 1994 – Centre of French Culture, Luxembourg
- 1993 – Agi Schöning Gallery, Zurich, Switzerland
- 1992 – Rosa Turetsky Gallery, Geneva, Switzerland
- 1992 – Agi Schöning Gallery, Zurich, Switzerland
- 1990 – Accatone Gallery, Paris, France
- 1989 – MAC 2000: Manifestation of Contemporary Art, Grand Palais, Paris, France
- 1987 – Caractères Gallery, Paris, France
- 1985 – Art Gallery, Luxembourg
- 1979 – Institute of Polish Culture, Paris, France
- 1979 – Diagonal Gallery, Paris, France
- 1974 – Pegaz Gallery, Zakopane, Poland
- 1971 – Pegaz Gallery, Zakopane, Poland
- 1967 – "Zak" Student Club, Gdańsk, Poland

=== Group exhibitions ===
- 2025 – Winter Group Show, Galerie Dutko, Paris Design Week, France
- 2023 – Art Paris, Galerie Dutko, Grand Palais Éphémère, Paris, France
- 2022 – Art Paris, Galerie Dutko, Grand Palais Éphémère, Paris, France
- 2021 – Art Paris, Galerie Dutko, Grand Palais Éphémère, Paris, France
- 2019 – L'Abandon du Sujet, Villa Théo, Le Lavandou, France
- 2018 – La Figure Seule, Château de Poncé, La Vallée du Loir, France
- 2016 – Layered Narratives: Collage/Photomontage/Print, l’étrangère, London, United Kingdom
- 2016 – De la Couleur à la Lumière, Abbaye de La Celle, Var, France
- 2015 – Museum of Contemporary Art Collection, shown at Museum de Arta, Cluj-Napoca, Romania
- 2014 – Museum Gorlice, Contemporary Art Foundation of Małopolska, Poland
- 2014 – Couleurs Contemporaines, Châteauvert, France
- 2011 – Particolare, Paths of Democracy, Signum Foundation, Palazzo Donà, Venice, Italy
- 2010 – BWA Gallery, Katowice, Poland
- 2009 – Acquisitions 1999–2009, Hôtel des Arts, Toulon, France
- 2008 – Museum of Contemporary Art, Kraków, Poland
- 2007 – Loneliness and Melancholy, Hans Weiss New Space Gallery, Manchester Community College, Connecticut, USA
- 2006 – Recent Acquisitions, Museum of Modern Art, Kraków, Poland
- 2006 – Twenty-First Century Polish Painting, National Gallery Zachęta, Warsaw, Poland
- 2005 – Museum of Contemporary Art, Kraków, Poland
- 2003 – La Collection, Hôtel des Arts, Toulon, France
- 2002 – Loin de la Ville, Château des Vintimille, Le Luc, France
- 2001 – Winter Exhibition, Bemis Center for Contemporary Art, Omaha, Nebraska, USA
- 2001 – Osaka Triennale, International Exhibition of Contemporary Art, Osaka, Japan
- 2001 – Edouard Manet Municipal Gallery, Gennevilliers, France
- 1998 – Yesterday and Tomorrow, Saint-Pol-sur-Ternoise, France
- 1997 – Art. 27, Marly-le-Roi, France
- 1997 – Akie Arichi Gallery, Paris, France
- 1997 – Galerie und Verlag, Hamburg, Germany
- 1997 – FIAC (Rosa Turetsky Gallery), Paris, France
- 1996 – Accatone Gallery, Paris, France
- 1996 – Emmanuel Carlebach Gallery, Paris, France
- 1996 – Centre for Contemporary Art, Pignans, France
- 1995 – Emmanuel Carlebach Gallery, Paris, France
- 1995 – Emmanuel Carlebach Gallery, Strasbourg, France
- 1994 – Rosa Turetsky Gallery (with Antoni Starczewski), Geneva, Switzerland
- 1994 – Emmanuel Carlebach Gallery, Paris, France
- 1992 – Signes de Liens, Collegiate Church of St. Peter, Orléans, France
- 1992 – Magda Danysz Gallery, Paris, France
- 1992 – Kunst auf Zeit, Graz, Austria
- 1990 – May Salon, Grand Palais, Paris, France
- 1990 – Jesteśmy, Zachęta State Gallery of Art, Warsaw, Poland
- 1990 – Aunkan Gallery, Osaka, Japan
- 1987 – Salon de Montrouge, Paris, France
- 1984 – Polnische Künstler Heute im Exil, Landau, Germany
- 1979 – Salon of Young Painters, Hall International des Expositions, Vincennes, France
- 1978 – IX Festival of Contemporary Polish Painting, Szczecin, Poland
- 1976 – National Painting Exhibition, Sopot, Poland
- 1975 – Museum of Sports and Tourism, Warsaw, Poland
- 1975 – National Painting Exhibition, Poznań, Poland
- 1973 – National Winter Exhibition, Zakopane, Poland
- 1973 – Bureau of Regional Art, Kraków, Poland
- 1972 – XIII Premi Internacional de Dibuix Joan Miró, Barcelona, Spain
- 1970 – Palazzo delle Esposizioni, Busto Arsizio, Italy
- 30 January - 13 March 2015, Marek Szczęsny, l’étrangère
- 23 Jun – 31 Jul 2016, Layered Narratives: Collage/Photomontage/Print, l'étrangère
