= Maciej Michalski =

- Occupation: Film Director

Maciej Michalski is a Polish film director and is known for creating video clips for the Polish singer Justyna Steczkowska.

== Music video clips ==
- If You Wanted - Indigo (2004)
- Call Me - Justyna Steczkowska (2004)
- Reborn - Fliper (2005)
- It Will Be Like That - Indigo (2006)
- Peace Of Heaven - Indigo (2006)
- My Greatest Dream - Irena Jarocka (2005)
- Johny - Justyna Steczkowska (2006)
- The Sun - Justyna Steczkowska (2006)
- Tu I Tu - Justyna Steczkowska (2006)
- Give Me A Moment - Justyna Steczkowska (2007)
- The Mystery Of Fellings - Justyna Steczkowska (2008)
- I Am Going Back Home - Justyna Steczkowska (2008)

== Filmography ==
- SCANDA, 2003 (Cast: Monika Burzyńska, Joanna Gołdyn, Danuta Wiśniewska, Music by Justyna Steczkowska)
- The Doll’s House, 2005 (Cast: Justyna Steczkowska, Monika Burzyńska, Magda Koper, Joanna Gołdyn, Ela Binkowska)
- Olives Oil, 2008 (Documentary)
- The Snow Queen, 2009 (Drama)
