= Przekrój =

Polish weekly newsmagazine

- Type: Magazine
- Owner: Przekrój Sp. z o.o.
- Editor: Tomasz Niewiadomski
- Founded: 1945; 81 years ago
- Headquarters: Warsaw
- Website: www.przekroj.pl/en

Przekrój (Polish pronunciation: [ˈpʂɛkruj]; Cross-section) was the oldest Polish weekly newsmagazine in operation, established in 1945 in Kraków. After temporary closure in 2013, it was bought by photographer Tomasz Niewiadomski and subsequently relaunched in December 2016 as a quarterly magazine. Przekrój's matchless literary style and lively visual charm were created due to the collaboration with the avant-garde of Polish intellectuals, writers, poets, artists and cartoonists. Przekrój was the birthplace of writers such as Wisława Szymborska, Stanisław Lem and Czesław Miłosz.

== History ==
Przekrój was created by the writer and graphic artist Marian Eile-Kwaśniewski (1910–1984) from Warsaw who, until 1969, was also the first and only editor-in-chief of the magazine. The magazine focused on current social, political and cultural events, both Polish and international. In the 1970s Przekrój reached a record circulation, with 700,000 copies per issue, by far the most popular magazine in the country. As of 2011, it had a modest circulation of 73,000 copies.

== Editors ==
The list of editors in chief in chronological order includes Marian Eile (1945–1969), Mieczysław Kieta (1969–1973), Mieczysław Czuma (1973–2000), Maciej Piotr Prus (2000–2001), Józef Lubiński (2001), Jacek Rakowiecki (2001–2002), Roman Kurkiewicz (2002), Piotr Najsztub (2002–2006), Mariusz Ziomecki (2006–2007), Jacek Kowalczyk (2007–2010), Katarzyna Janowska (2010–2011), Artur Rumianek (2011), Donat Szyller (2011), Roman Kurkiewicz (2012), Zuzanna Ziomecka, Marcin Prokop (2012-2013) and Tomasz Niewiadomski (from 2016).

Following its closure in 2013, Przekrój was out of print until December 2016, when it was relaunched as a quarterly, with an editorial style deeply inspired by the early editions of the magazine from the 1950s and 1960s.

== Contributors ==
Among the former contributors to Przekrój were such figures of the Polish literary and art scene as Maria Dąbrowska, Jarosław Iwaszkiewicz, Jan Brzechwa, Bohdan Butenko, Konstanty Ildefons Gałczyński, Kazimierz Wyka, Daniel Mróz, Jerzy Waldorff, Sławomir Mrożek, Ludwik Jerzy Kern, Joanna Oparek, Wojciech Plewiński, Jerzy Vetulani and Jan Błoński.

== See also ==
- List of magazines in Poland
