= Miho Iwata =

Japanese performance artist

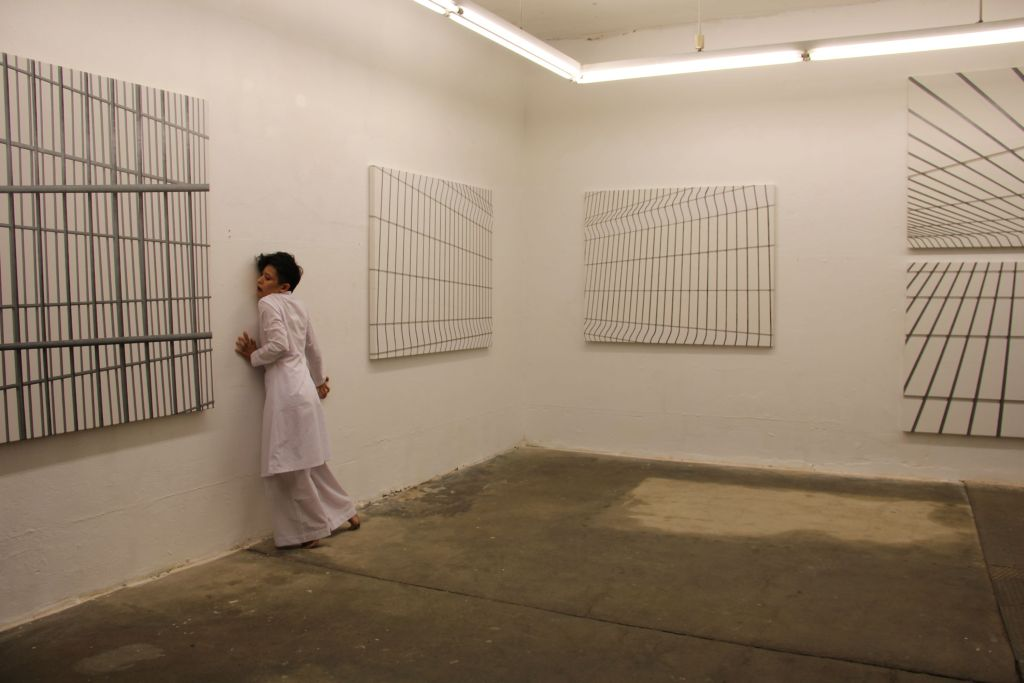
Meta Biel 2012, Miho Iwata

Miho Iwata (born 1962 in Ichinomiya, Aichi, Japan) is a performance artist, scenographer and choreographer. In 1986 she emigrated to Kraków, Poland, where she lives and works. Her work is performed at theater and arts festivals throughout Poland and abroad.

== Education and early career ==
She received a degree in architecture at Kyoto Prefectural University and studied Polish philology at Jagiellonian University in Kraków. In 1991 she was first introduced to butoh dance in Poland through the work of Daisuke Yoshimoto, Kazuo Ohno and Min Tanaka.

== Artistic work ==
Her first Kraków performance was the piece Legs of pigeon presented at the Krzysztofory Gallery in Kraków in 1994. It was represented in 1995 at the Flying Art Festival at an abandoned factory in Solvay. This event was also the first large scale rave in Kraków. She followed this with the scenic works Granat, in 1996 The moon and fish neck in 1998, both at the Krzysztofory gallery. In 2001 she premiered Utsusemi at the Festival Rozdroze, in the Ujazdowski Castle Contemporary Art Centre in Warsaw.

In 2002 Iwata began collaborating on a series of improvisational work. She starting working with musicians as an Improviser's Ensemble called Improvising Artists. She also continued working as a solo artist with the performance Thousands of Dream at Otwarta Pracownia gallery in Kraków. Thousands of Dream is silent improvised piece without the addition of theatrical lighting or sound, using only the blank gallery space and atmosphere.

She also creates performance works for art exhibitions including Marek Chlanda's sculptures, group Rdzen's installation with living cooks and ducks at the Zacheta Gallery, a Pirko Schroder's video installation, Thomas May's installation with grass, and Robakowski's video work. Iwata has also been featured in the animated films Sea Swallow Me directed by Katarzyna Kifert and Triptych Part 3 by Piotr Jakubowicz. She also participated in Maciej Wałczak's multimedia live project at GPS4 in 2003.

== Festivals and galleries ==
Iwata's work has been featured at various festivals and galleries including Ujazdowski Castle Contemporary Art Centre, the Zachęta Gallery in Warsaw, the Krzysztofory Gallery, Otwarta Pracownia, Bunkier Sztuki-Cracow Contemporary Art Gallery, and the Solvay Contemporary Art Centre in Kraków. Also, her work has been seen at the BWA Gallery in Lublin, the Manhattan Gallery in Łódź, and the Arsenal Gallery in Białystok.

She is a member of the artists’ groups Otwarta Pracownia and Improvising Artists. Documentation of the work of these groups are in the collection of Sygnal od Time /Znaki Czasu in the Małopolska Region, Kraków.

== Recent work ==
In 2004 Iwata collaborated on a series of performances with musicians as {i,a}, including In Aut and In Dua, Spring, a duet with Marzena Lis on piano performed in Willa Decjusz and the multimedia art project Kraków-Lipowa 4 in Oskar Schindler's former factory accompanied by a full band. She also created a duet entitled Home with T. Choloniewski as a part of the Home Atmosphere project in Archemia, Kraków.

In 2006 she was invited to perform in Tetsuo Furudate's DADAyama project to Berlin as part of Deutschlandradio's celebration of 90 years of Dada, which was broadcast over European Broadcasting Union radio. In that same year, Thousands of a Dream was presented at Gallery ZERO in Berlin, Germany.

She is working on projects as the artist in residence at Kyoto Art Center, Japan. In September 2006 she was to take part in Polish Sound Art, a two-week arts festival in various cities in China.
