= Michał Cała =

Polish photographer

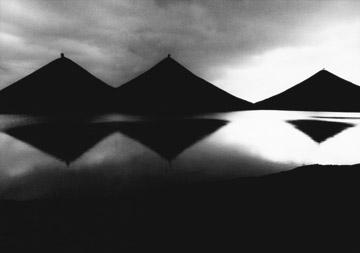
Michał Cała, Czerwionka 1978, "Silesia" project

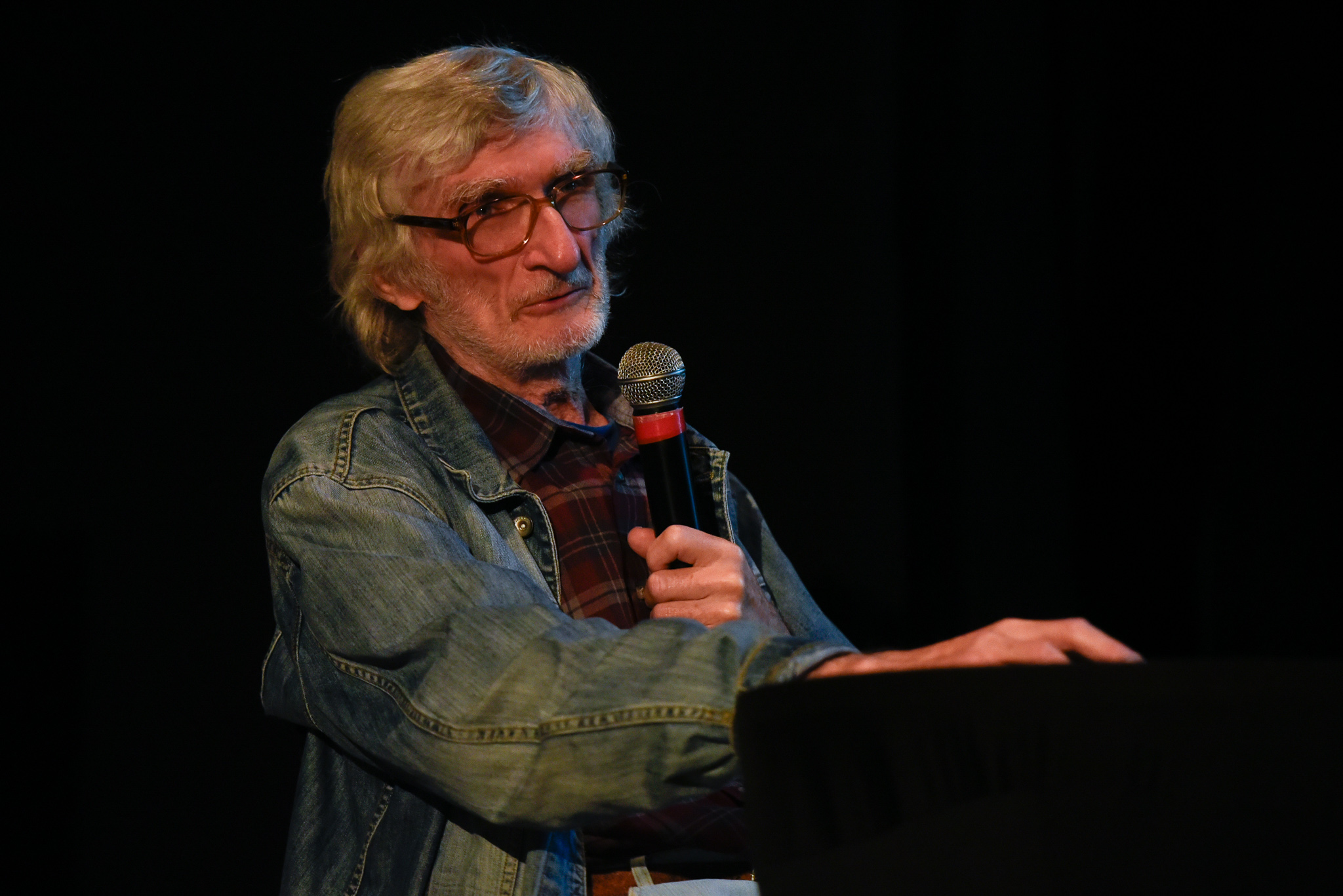
Michał Cała during FotoArtFestival, 2023

Michał Cała (born in 1948 in Toruń) is a Polish photographer.

Having graduated from Warsaw University of Technology, he moved to Tychy and from 1975 to 1992 he photographed the Silesian landscape. The most important result of his work was a series of black-and-white photographs called Silesia. He was particularly interested in labourers' housing districts, old ironworks, coal mines and enormous coal heaps. He was also taking pictures of people, who lived in that environment.

The author is a laureate of many photography competitions. On two occasions he won Grand Prix at Biennale of Polish Landscape in Kielce in 1979 and 1983. As a result of his partnership with Galeria Zderzak in Kraków in years 2004-2006 he published black-and-white album Silesia. The second important black-and-white series created by Michał Cała is Galicja (about south-east Poland). He was also the author of the exhibition Paysages de Pologne shown in Galerie Contraste in Bordeaux in 1985.

In 2007 Michał Cała was invited to take part in the exhibition presenting photographs of 100 most important Polish photographers in the 20th century: Polish Photography in 20th Century (Warsaw, Vilnius).

In the same year he presented his series Silesia at 2. Foto Festival Mannheim Ludwigshafen Heidelberg. He also won first place in Pilsner International Photo Awards 2007, category Industrial. In the same year British Foto8 magazine and British Journal of Photography published articles about the author and his photographs. In 2008 his photos were also part of the project Behind Wall at the Noorderlicht Photofestival in the Netherlands.

In 2009, two exhibitions took place: one in Silesian Museum in Katowice titled Michał Cała, Edward Poloczek, Silesian Inspirations of Landscape and second in Stara Galeria of Union of Polish Art Photographers in Warsaw titled Michał Cała, 30 Years of Photography in Silesia.

His photographs were published in albums The Anthology of Polish Photography 1839-1989, Masters of Polish Landscape and Polish Photography in 20th Century.

From 1983, he is a member of Union of Polish Art Photographers. Currently he lives in Bielsko-Biała.
