= Robert Pranagal =

Polish photographer (b. 1969)

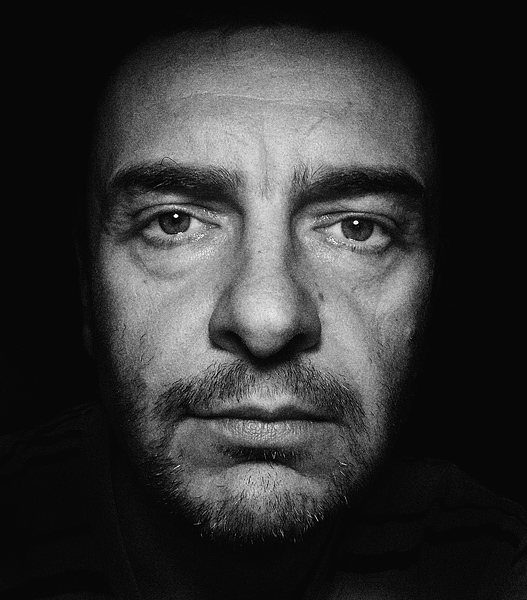
Robert Pranagal

Robert Pranagal (born in 1969 in Świdnik) is a Polish photographer. He has won numerous awards and honors including the title of International Artist from The International Federation of Photographic Art (FIAP), the title of Excellence FIAP, and the artist title from the Polish Republic's Photoclub. Pranagal was born in Swidnik, Poland.

== Life and career ==
Pranagal is associated with Lublin cultural institutions and the photographic community in which he engages in creative, animation, and educational activities. He primarily works in portraiture, music photography, and experimental photography using ancient photographic techniques such as gum and oil printing.

Since 2014 his photographs have been honored at over 30 international salons of photography held under patronages from The International Federation of Photographic Art) (FIAP), Photographic Society of America (PSA), International Association of Art Photographers (IAAP), Global Photographic Union (GPU), and many other photographic organizations. Pranagal has won dozens of awards, including gold, silver and bronze medals, honorable mentions and diplomas from FIAP, PSA, Master of Light, ART FOTO (Serbia), Greek Artistic Photography, Federation of Indian Photography, Serbian Photographers Association, Federazione Italiana Associazioni Fotografiche (Italy), Polish Republic's Photoclub, Hellenic Photographic Society (Greece), Associatia Artistiloro Fotografi Romania, Photography and Art Research Institute (China), EXCEED (India), ARTFOTO (Bosnia and Herzegovina), OneShotPhotoCon Federation (Hungary), Sydney International Exhibition of Photography (Australia), and many others.

== Exhibitions ==
- Prophecies - Cultural Center in Lublin (2022)
- Sub-worlds (2021)
- Memu Miastu - Part 3 (2020)
- Memu Miastu - Part 2 (2019)
- Memu Miastu (2018)
- Return (2016)
- Avia (2015)
- Different World (2014)
- Jazz – Personal Affair (2014)
- Tell Me... (2014)
- Human Factor (2010)

Pranagal has participated in numerous collective exhibitions and shows, including those accompanying international salons of photography, in South Africa, Argentina, Austria, Australia, Belgium, Bulgaria, Bosnia and Herzegovina, China, Montenegro, Greece, Spain, Ireland, Israel, Macedonia, Poland, Russia, Romania, Serbia, Slovakia, Scotland, Sweden, Turkey, USA, Wales, United Arab Emirates, Italy, Cyprus, and Hungary.
