= Leon Barszczewski =

Leon Barszczewski (February 20, 1849 in Warsaw – March 19, 1910 in Częstochowa) was a soldier, topographer, explorer of the Central Asia culture, naturalist, and glaciologer. He was a subject of the Russian Empire.

At the Paris exposition of 1895, he won a gold medal for his photographs of minerals.
