= Four Domes Pavilion =

Museum in Wrocław, Poland

Coordinates: 51°6′30″N 17°4′34″E

- Pawilon Czterech Kopuł
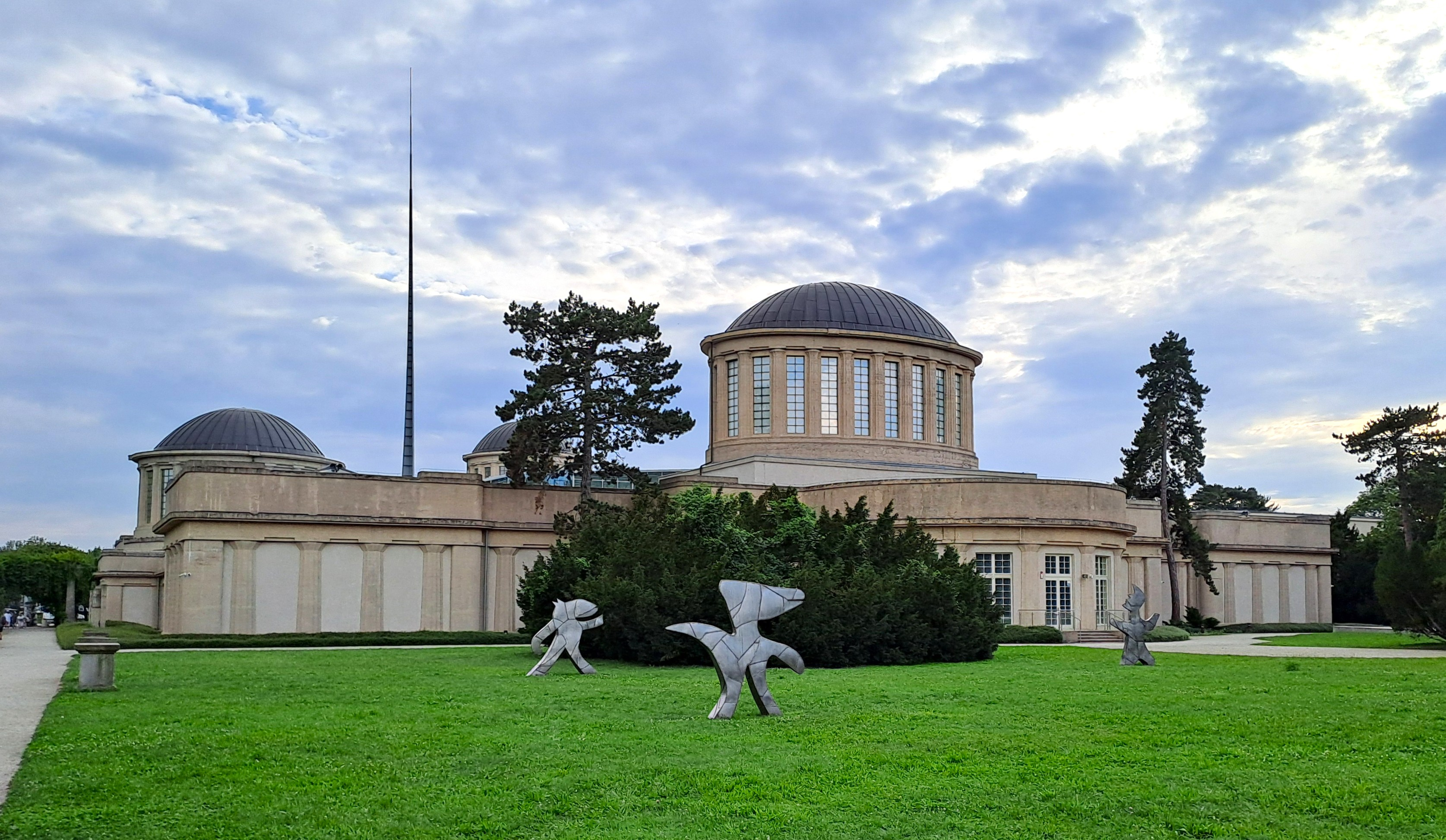
- Rear view of the Four Domes Pavilion.

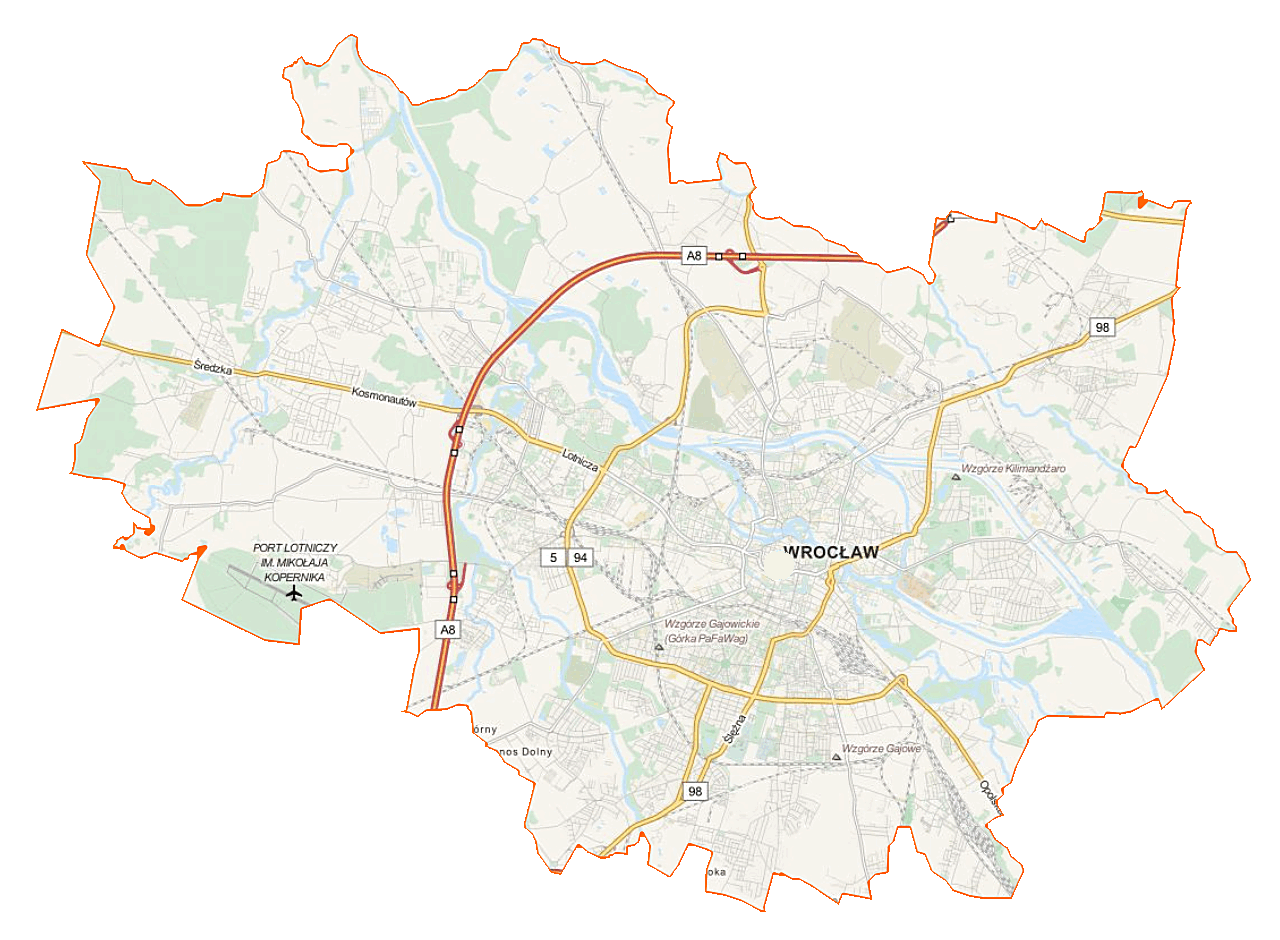
- Location within Wrocław
- Former names: Vier-Kuppel-Pavillon

General information
- Architectural style: Modernism
- Location: Wrocław, Poland
- Construction started: 1912
- Completed: 1913
- Owner: National Museum in Wrocław

Design and construction
- Architect: Hans Poelzig

Website
- www.pawilonczterechkopul.pl

Four Domes Pavilion is a pavilion built at the beginning of the 20th century on the exhibition grounds in the eastern part of Wrocław.

== History ==
=== The Centennial Exhibition ===
The director of the Silesian Museum of Applied Arts and Antiquities, Karl Masner, proposed to the Wrocław City Council the organization of the Centennial Exhibition. It was planned to commemorate the 100th anniversary of Prussia's victory in the Battle of Leipzig (1813) and was part of celebrations marking the rise of the Prussian state in Europe. The Four Domes Pavilion, where Masner planned to organize the historical exhibition, was located near the Centennial Hall along with other accompanying structures (including the Pergola and Japanese Garden).

The construction was carried out by the Schlesische Beton Baugesellschaft company, according to the design of Hans Poelzig, between August 1912 and February 1913. In the pavilion's inner courtyard, there was a fountain with a sculpture by Wrocław sculptor Professor Robert Bednorz, representing the Greek goddess Athena (it has not survived to this day).

From May 20 to October 26 the pavilion hosted a historical exhibition. In 56 rooms, the history of wars, battles, including the victorious one at Leipzig, and important figures was presented. The largest dome, the North Dome, featured a section dedicated to the history of Wrocław during the Napoleonic Wars, including an original proclamation by Frederick William III from 1813, An Mein Volk (To My People), calling for a fight against Napoleon...

=== Interwar period ===
In 1920 the pavilion hosted the "Great Art Exhibition," featuring works by contemporary artists such as Paul Klee, Karl Schmidt-Rottluff, and Oskar Moll.

In 1929 the exhibition "Housing and Workplaces" was held, showcasing urban planning principles.

=== Post-World War II Period ===
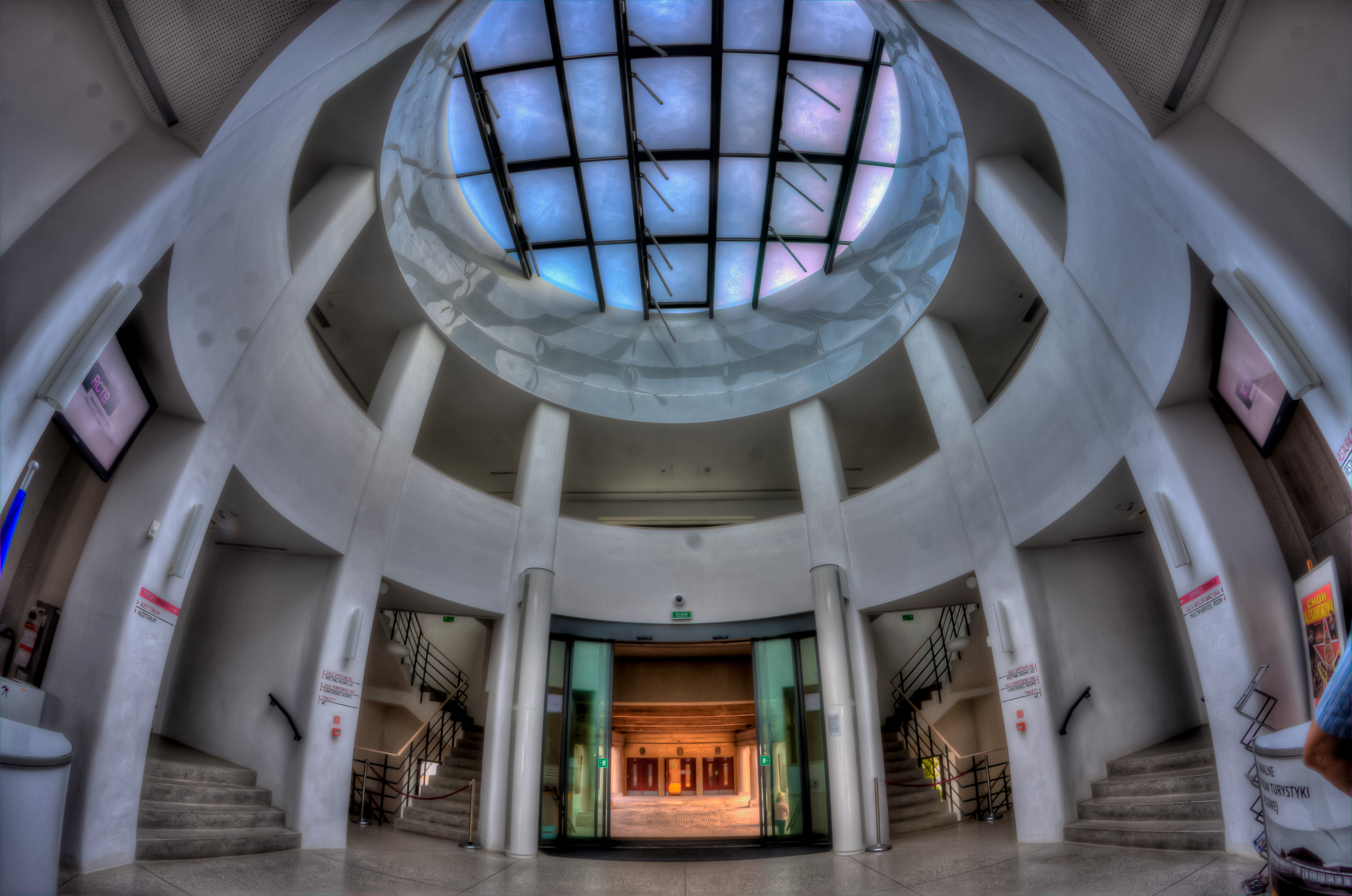
Interior

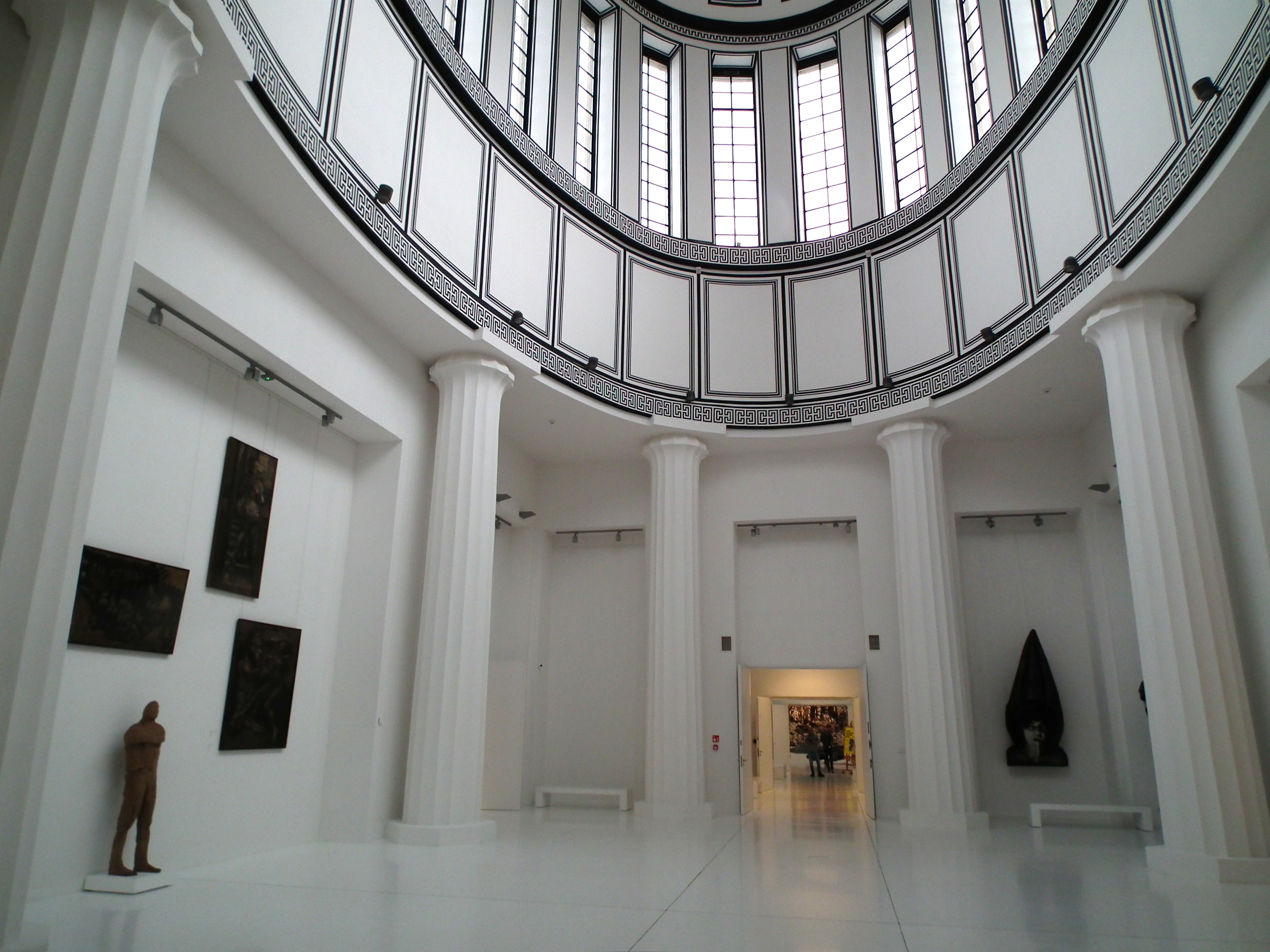
Interior

The pavilion was not destroyed during the war.

==== Reclaimed Lands Exhibition ====
From July 21 to October 31 1948, the pavilion hosted a historical exhibition as part of the Exhibition of Reclaimed Lands. The rooms were named: Victory Hall, Destruction Hall, Unity of Silesia Hall, and Coal Hall. A 106-meter-high spire was erected in front of the pavilion. The exhibition was visited by 1 million people.

==== Planetarium ====
In May 1951, thanks to engineer Konsanty Czetyrbok, president of the Wrocław branch of the Polish Society of Astronomical Enthusiasts, and employees of the Wrocław Observatory, a Zeiss planetarium was assembled from parts found at the observatory. It was installed in one of the domes of the pavilion in May 1951 and opened to the public. In 1953, it was moved to one of the rotundas of the Centennial Hall.

In 1953 the pavilion became the location for the Wrocław Feature Film Studio, which used its rooms as a film studio.

==== National Museum ====
In 2009 the pavilion was taken over by the National Museum in Wrocław. In May 2013 a major renovation was carried out to adapt the building for the museum's needs, resulting in new exhibition spaces—over six thousand square meters dedicated to contemporary art exhibitions. An outdoor sculpture gallery was also created in the surrounding park. The renovation was completed in June 2015.

Since June 25, 2016, the Four Domes Pavilion has been home to the Museum of Contemporary Art, a branch of the National Museum in Wrocław.

The museum's collection includes works by artists such as Magdalena Abakanowicz, Paweł Althamer, Mirosław Bałka, Stanisław Fijałkowski, Władysław Hasior, Tadeusz Kantor, Katarzyna Kozyra, Jan Lebenstein, Jerzy Nowosielski, and Alina Szapocznikow

== UNESCO World Heritage List ==
Since 2006 the pavilion has been included on the UNESCO World Heritage List. It was listed along with the neighboring Centennial Hall.

== Architecture ==
The Four Domes Pavilion is a single-story building, without a basement. It has a reinforced concrete structure. Four wings surround the inner courtyard. Four domes are located in the central part of each wing. The eastern and western domes are circular, while the southern and northern domes are elliptical
