= National Museum in Wrocław =

Coordinates: 51°06′39″N 17°02′51.4″E

- Muzeum Narodowe we Wrocławiu

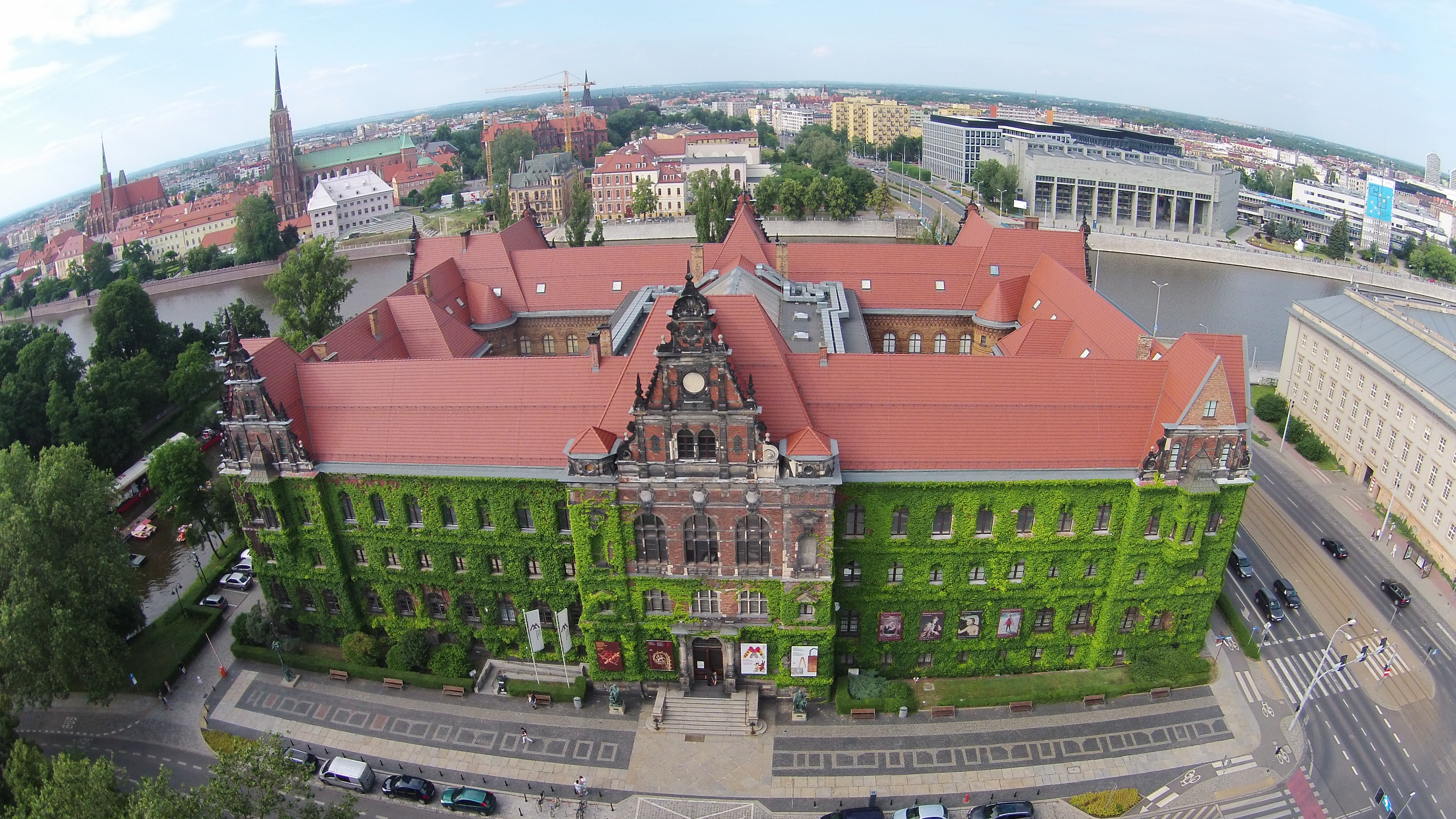
- National Museum in Wrocław
- Established: 28 March 1947
- Location: Pl. Powstańców Warszawy 5 Wrocław, Poland
- Type: National museum
- Director: Dr Piotr Oszczanowski
- Curator: Bożena Guldan-Klamecka
- Website: mnwr.pl

The National Museum in Wrocław (Polish: Muzeum Narodowe we Wrocławiu), established 28 March 1947 and officially inaugurated on 11 July 1948, is one of Poland's main branches of the National Museum system. It holds one of the largest collections of contemporary art in the country.

== Conclusion of World War II ==
The holdings of Wrocław Museum are closely connected with the history of border shifts in Central Europe following World War II. After the annexation of eastern half of the Second Polish Republic by the Soviet Union, main parts of Poland's art collections were transferred from the cities incorporated into the USSR like Lviv. Collections not returned included the Ossolineum holdings which became part of the Lviv National Museum. The cultural heritage shipped in 1946 included Polish and European paintings from 17th to 19th centuries.

Most historic buildings in Wrocław were destroyed or heavily damaged during the Siege of Breslau. The new Polish Department of Museums and Heritage Protection (Referat Muzeów i Ochrony Zabytków, RMOZ) was entrusted with the task of selecting a suitable placement for the newly arriving cultural artefacts. The relatively undamaged location was chosen on January 1, 1947 among the ruins of the old city center, at the former Silesian regency office built in 1883–1886.

Although the location of the National Museum and its collections were new in Wrocław, the actual tradition of art museums in the city was centuries old. Its predecessors included the Royal Museum of Art and Antiquity formed in 1815 (German: Königliches Museum für Kunst und Altertümer) and the Silesian Museum of Fine Arts created in 1880, as well as the Silesian Museum of Applied Arts formed in 1899. When Poland disappeared from the map of Europe at the end of the 18th century many artefacts produced by Polish artists and artisans were also displayed there. In 2022, a painting by a follower of Lucas Cranach the Elder titled Lamentation completed in the 1530s, which had previously been stolen from the National Museum in 1946, shortly after the end of World War II, was returned to the museum.

== Permanent exhibits ==
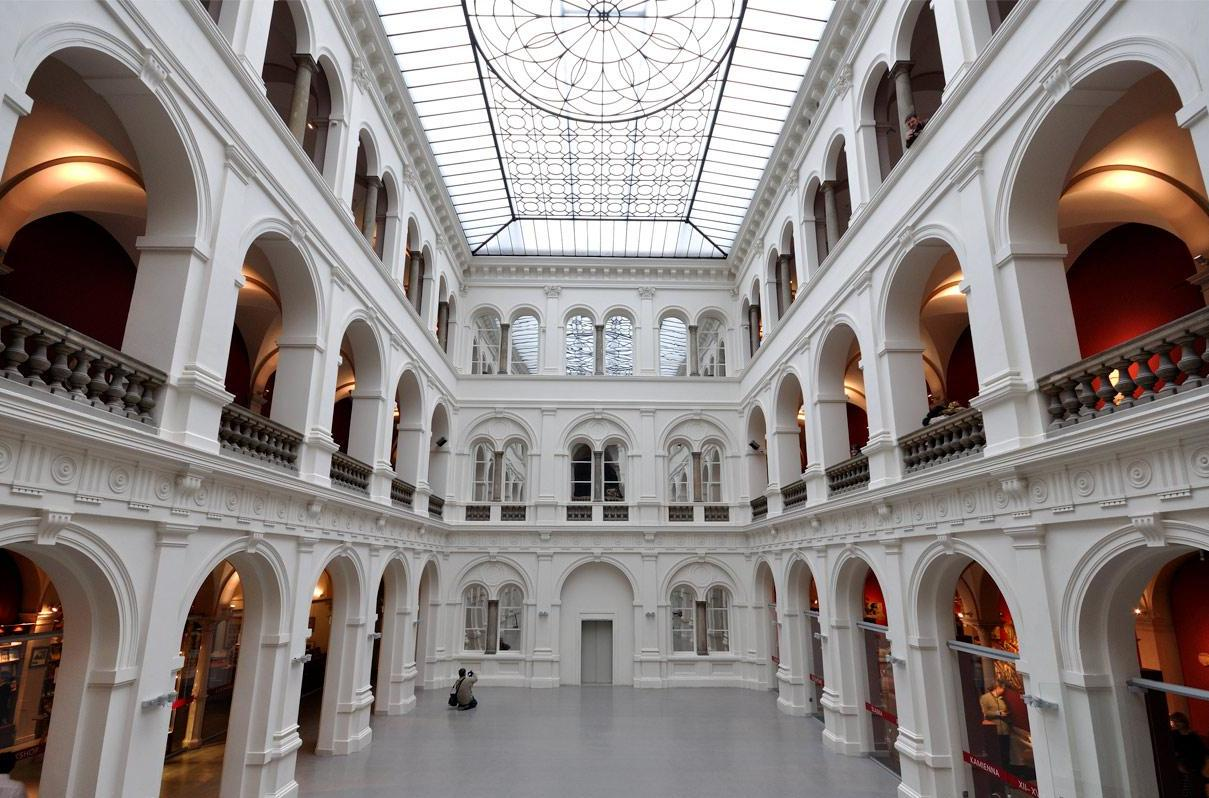
Interior of the museum

Admission to the gallery is free on Saturdays. Among the permanent exhibitions set up on different floors of the museum are four distinct departments divided by art-periods and historical epochs. The oldest is the "Silesian Art of the 12th to 16th century", featuring tombs of Silesian princes and the most precious works of the Gothic art in Poland. The second is the "Silesian Art of the 16th to 19th century" with sculpture, painting, and decorative arts from Silesian Renaissance to Romanticism. The next is the "Polish Art of the 17th to 19th century" with Polish Baroque portraits by Marceli Bacciarelli and Canaletto among others. And finally, the renowned "European Art of the 15th–20th Century", which features the works of such artists as Pieter Brueghel the Younger, Agnolo Bronzino, Cosimo Rosselli, Giovanni Santi, Lucas Cranach the Elder, Paris Bordone, Frans Floris, Osias Beert, Jan Frans van Bloemen, Francisco de Zurbarán, Lovis Corinth, Élisabeth Vigée Le Brun and Wassily Kandinsky.

Apart from these exhibitions, the museum includes "Polish Art of the 20th century" collection with art of Tadeusz Makowski, Stanisław Ignacy Witkiewicz, Władysław Strzemiński, Henryk Stażewski, Alina Szapocznikow, Tadeusz Kantor, Tadeusz Makowski, Jerzy Nowosielski, Józef Szajna, Magdalena Abakanowicz, Paweł Althamer, Mirosław Bałka, Władysław Hasior, Katarzyna Kozyra, and many prominent others. Month of September 2011 marked the opening of "New Gallery of Contemporary Art" in the museum's remodelled attic.

== Gallery ==
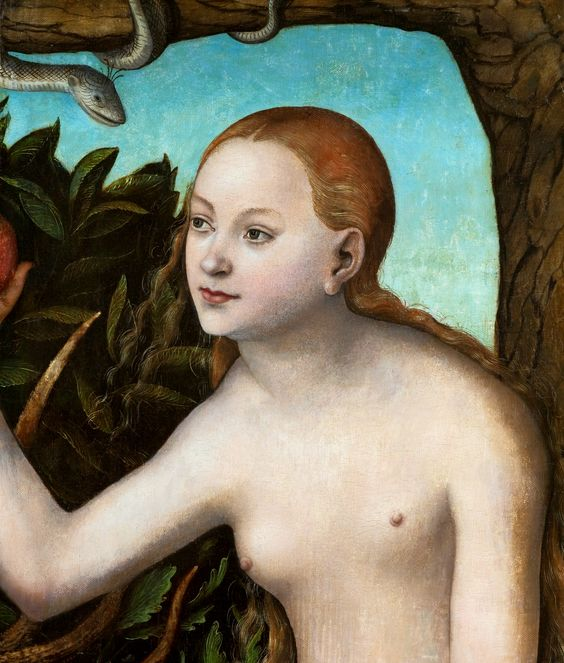
Lucas Cranach the Elder, Eve (ca. 1531)

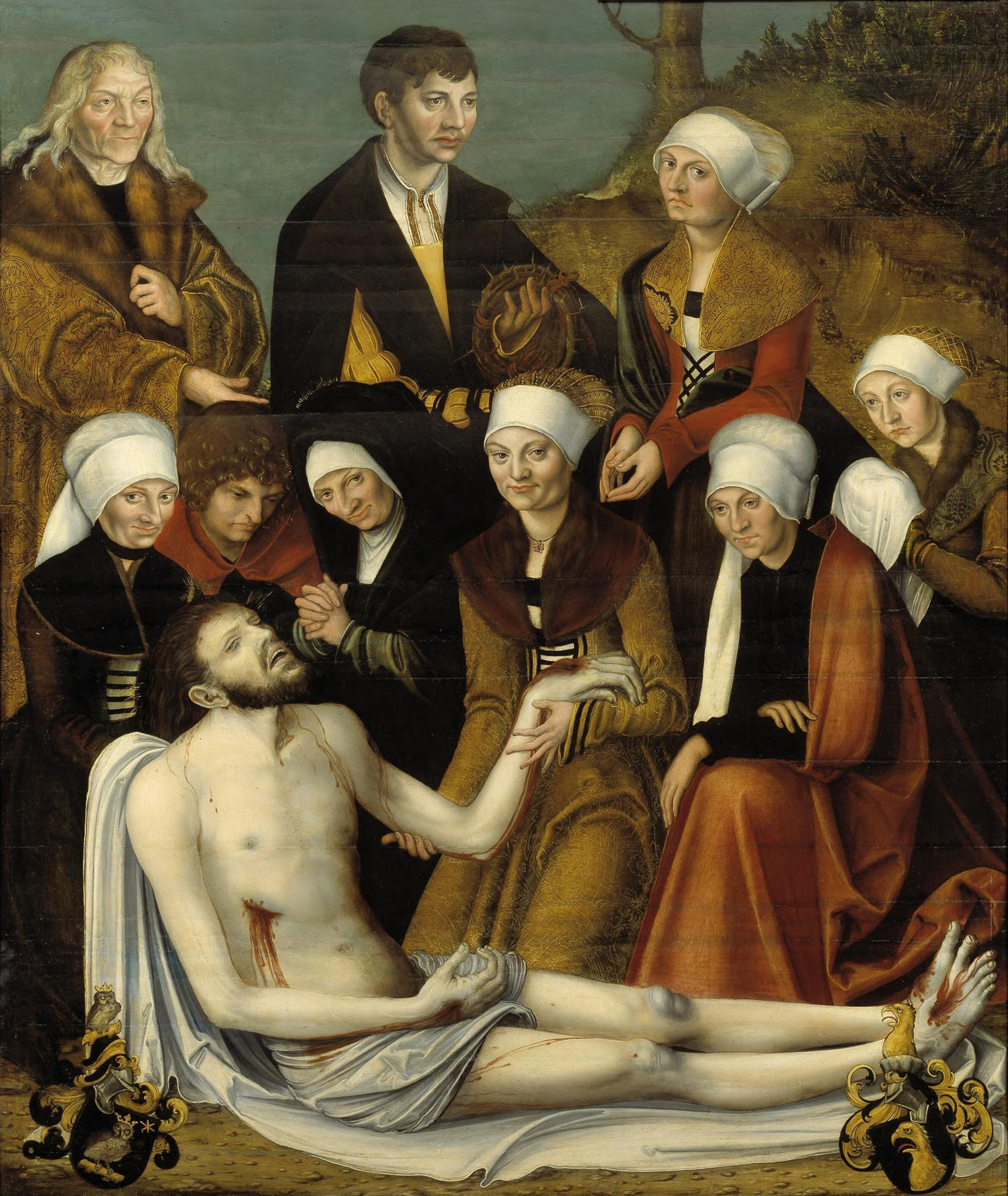
The lamentation by Lucas Cranach

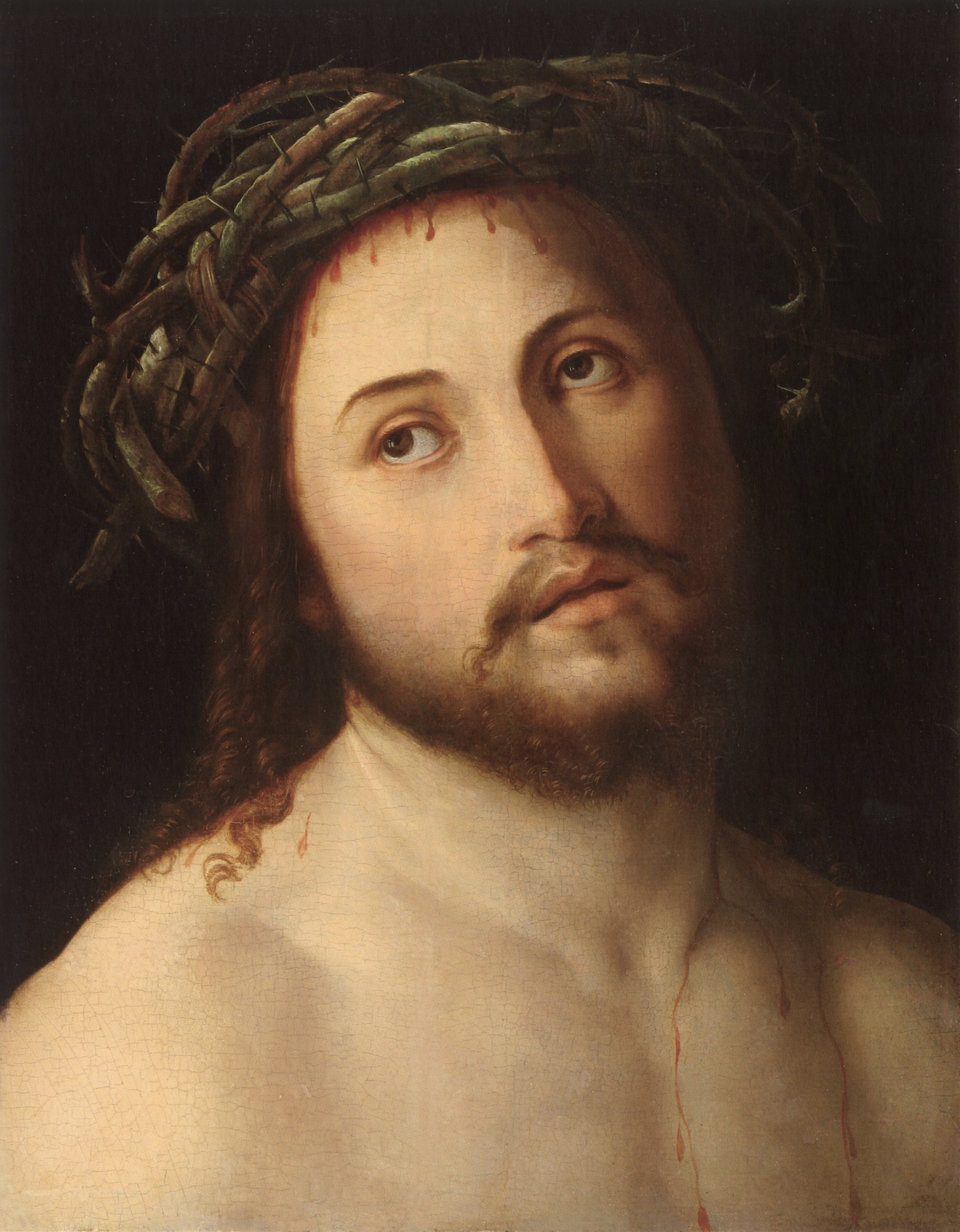
Georg Pencz, Christ in the Crown of Thorns (1544)

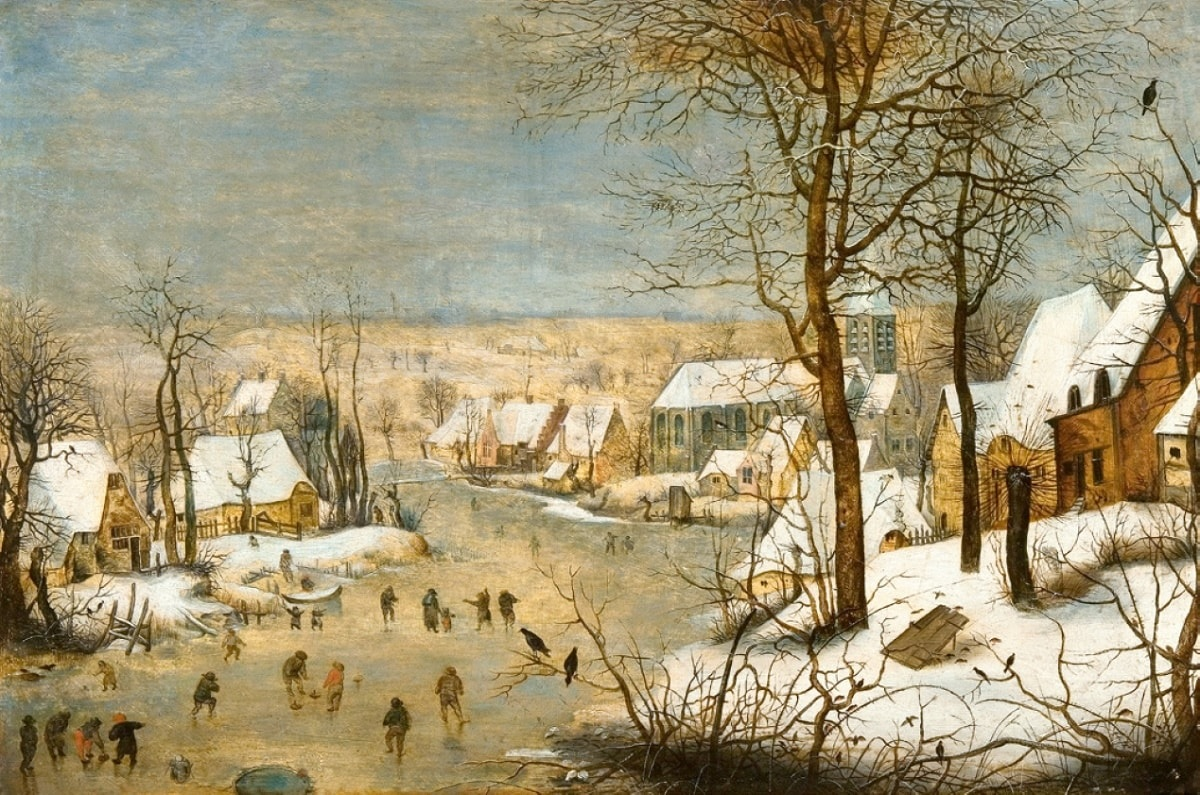
Pieter Brueghel the Younger, Winter Landscape (ca.1586)

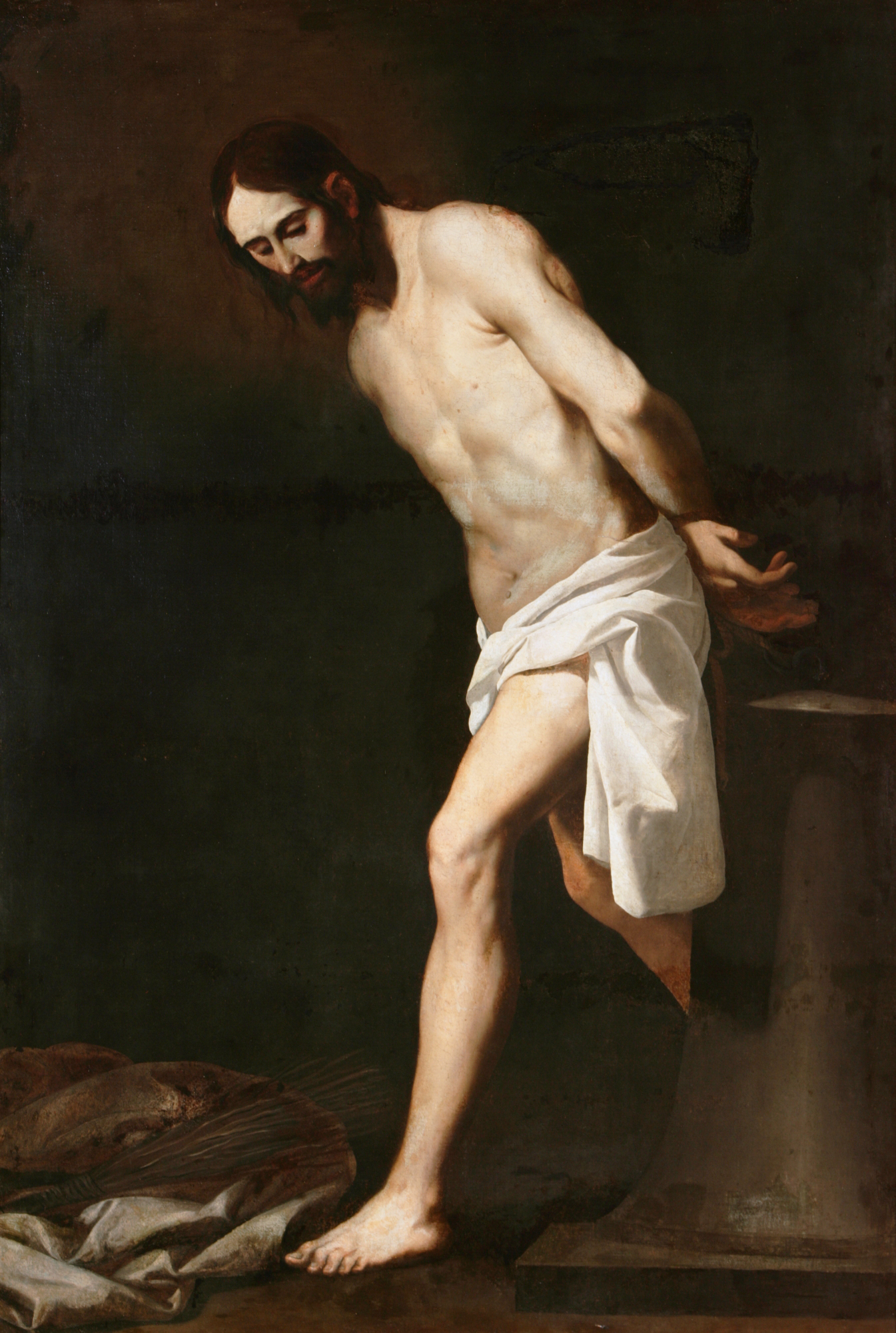
Francisco de Zurbarán, Christ at the Column (1661)

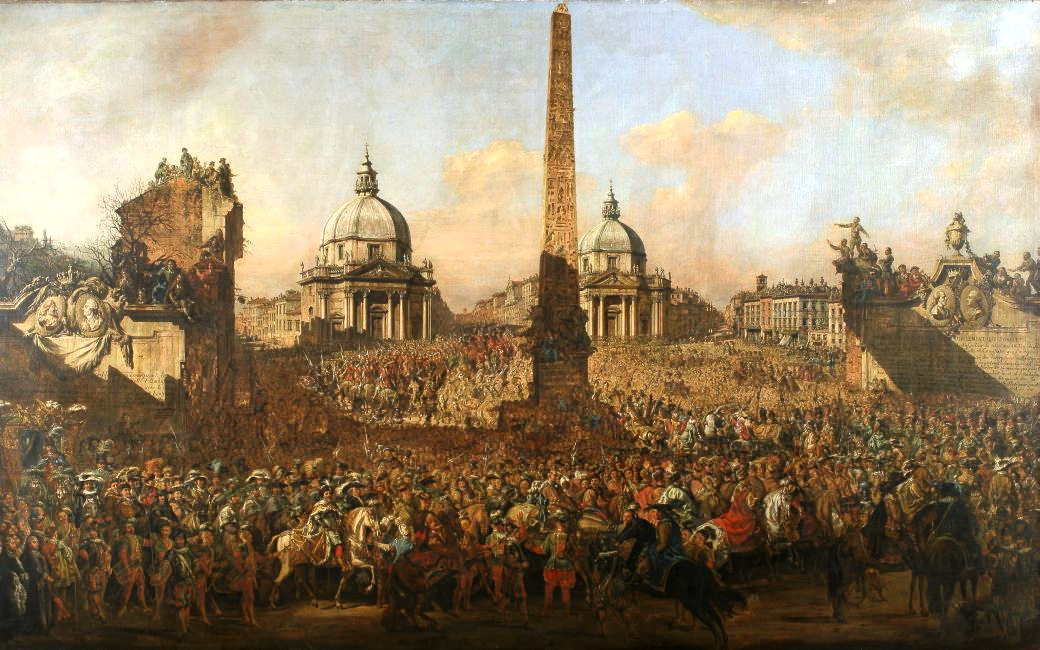
Bernardo Bellotto, Entrance of Jerzy Ossoliński to Rome in 1633, (1779)

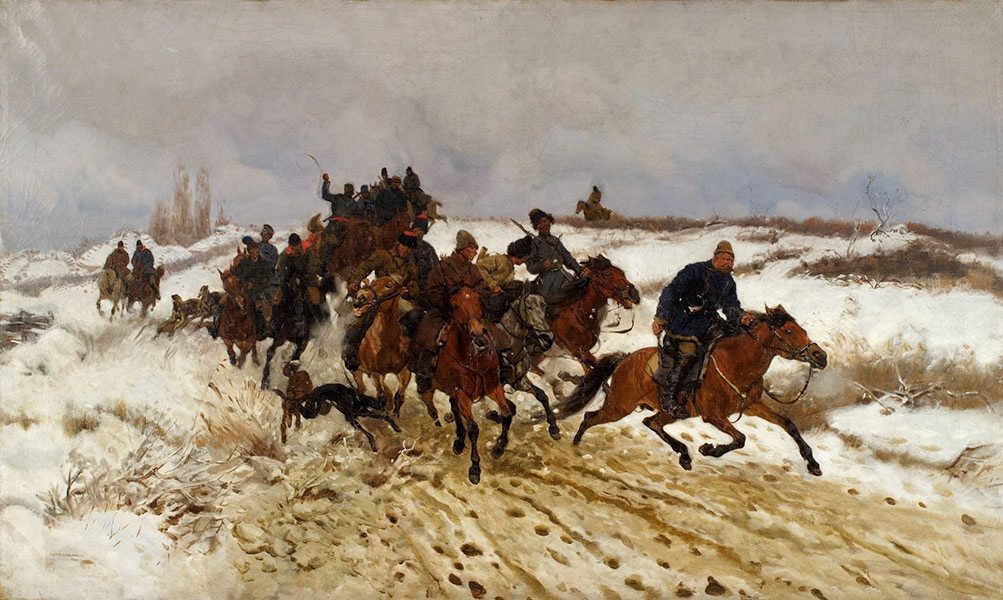
Józef Chełmoński, Hunting (1882)

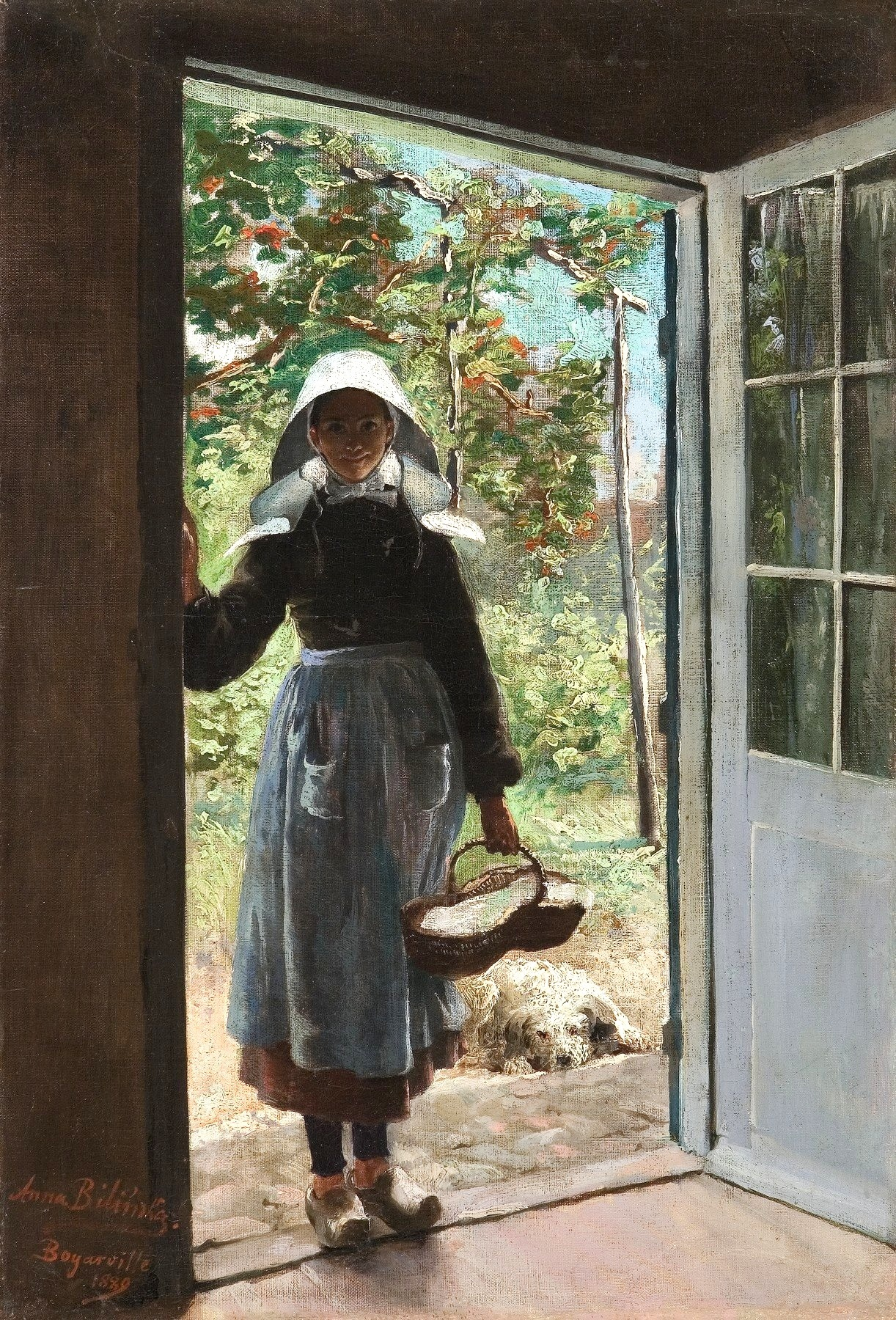
Anna Bilińska, Breton Woman Standing on a Doorstep (1889)

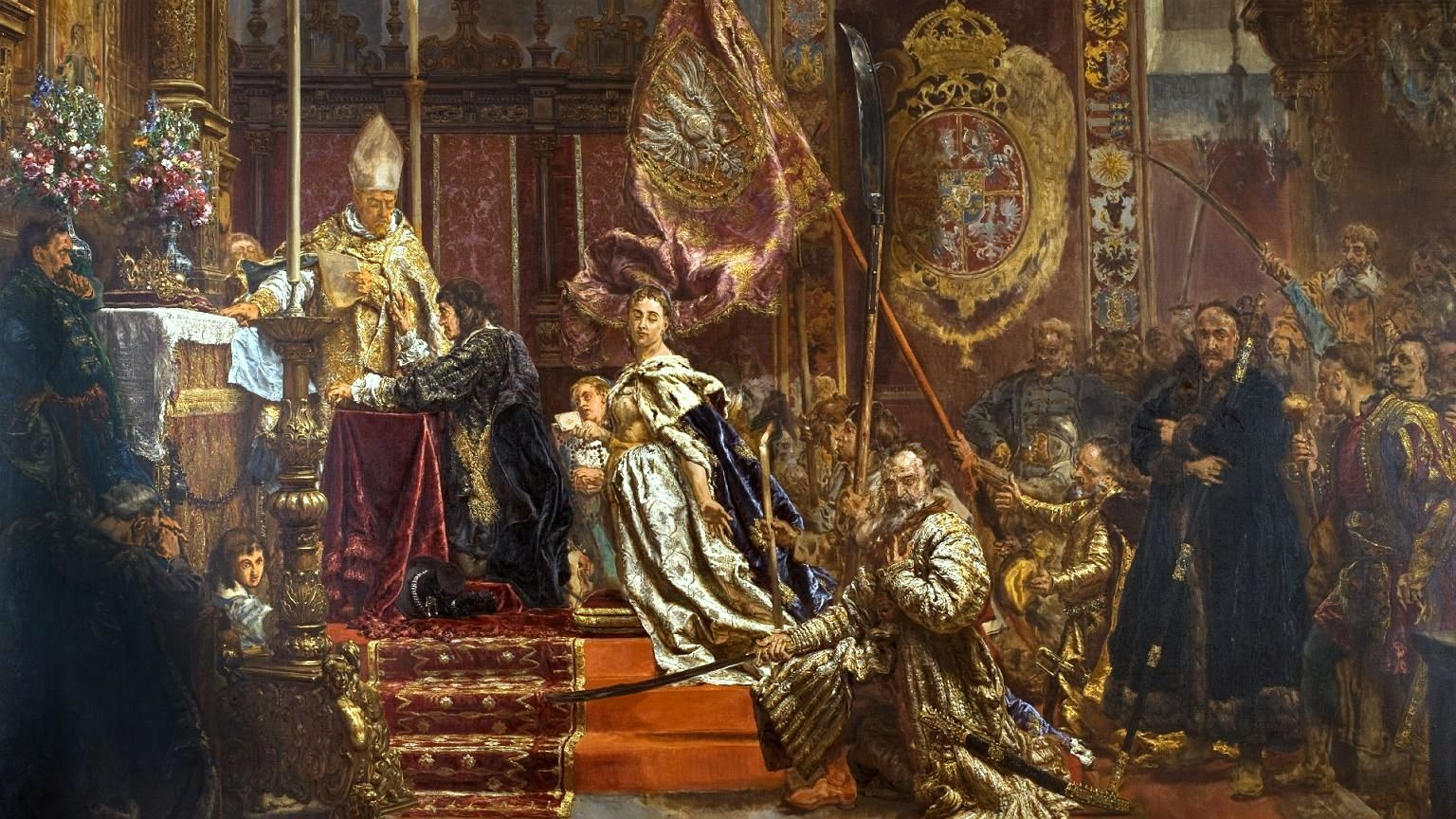
Jan Matejko, The Oath of Jan Kazimierz (1893)

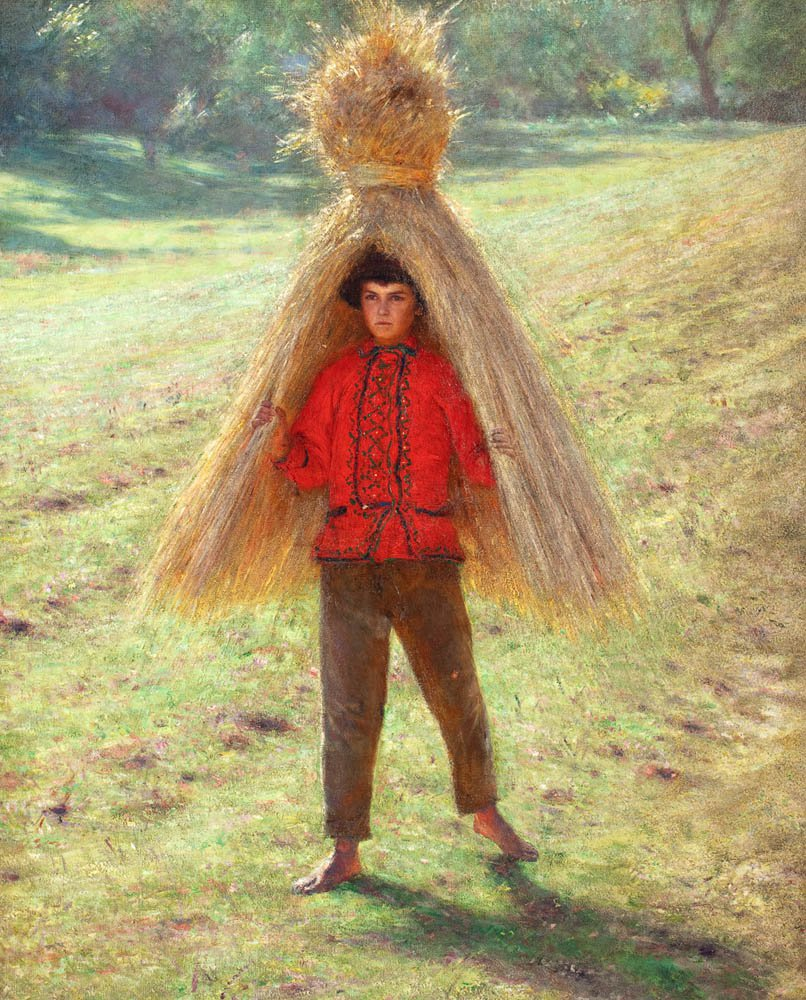
Aleksander Gierymski, Boy Carrying a Sheaf (1895)

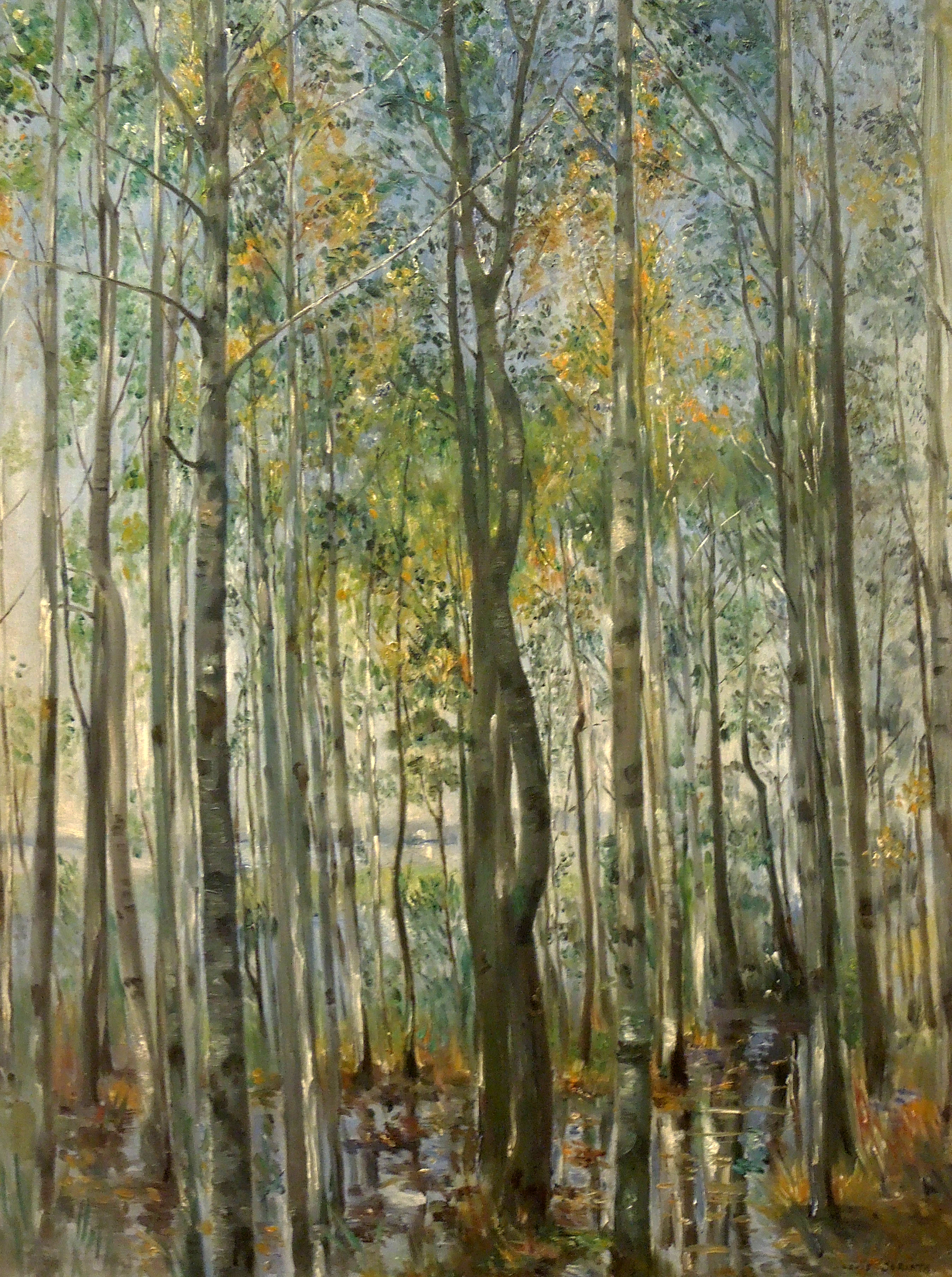
Lovis Corinth, A Forest. Flooding on Lake Starnberg (1896)

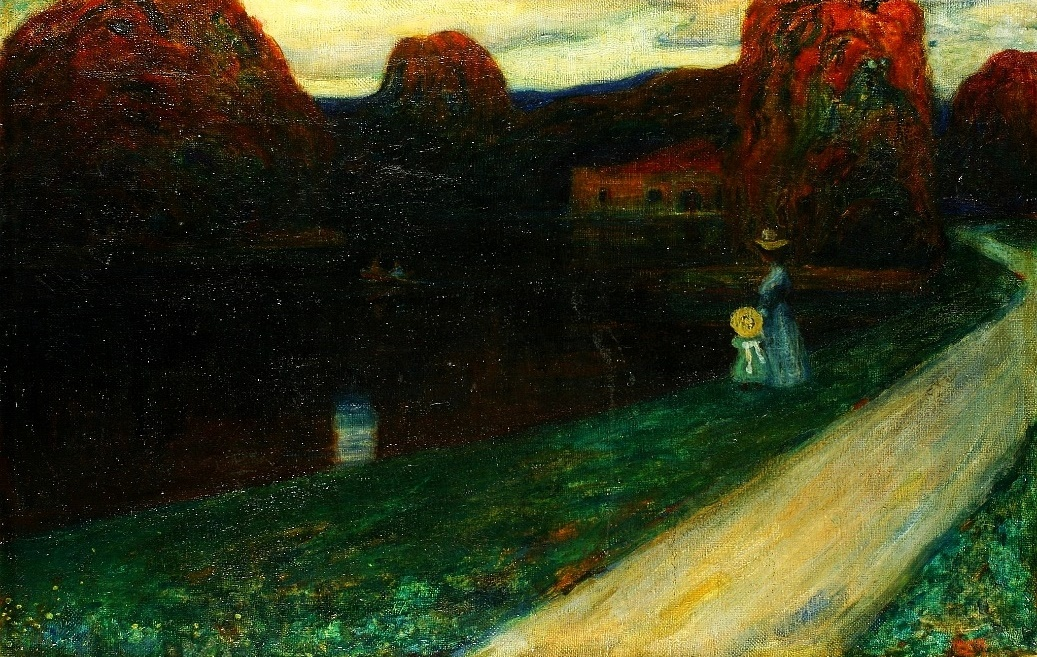
Vassily Kandinsky, The Evening, (1903)

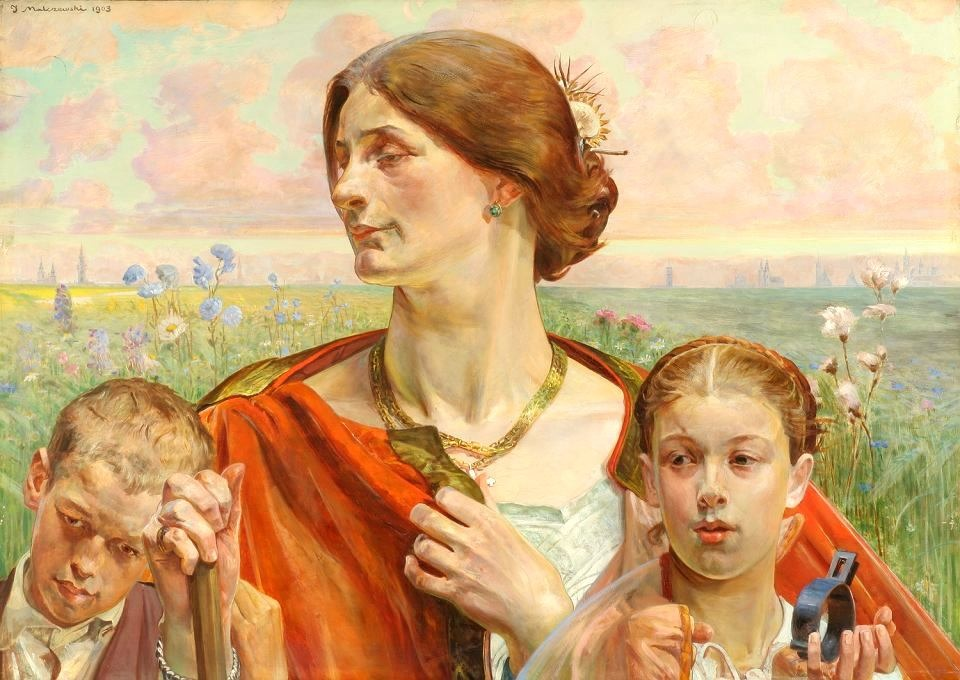
Jacek Malczewski, Motherland (1903)

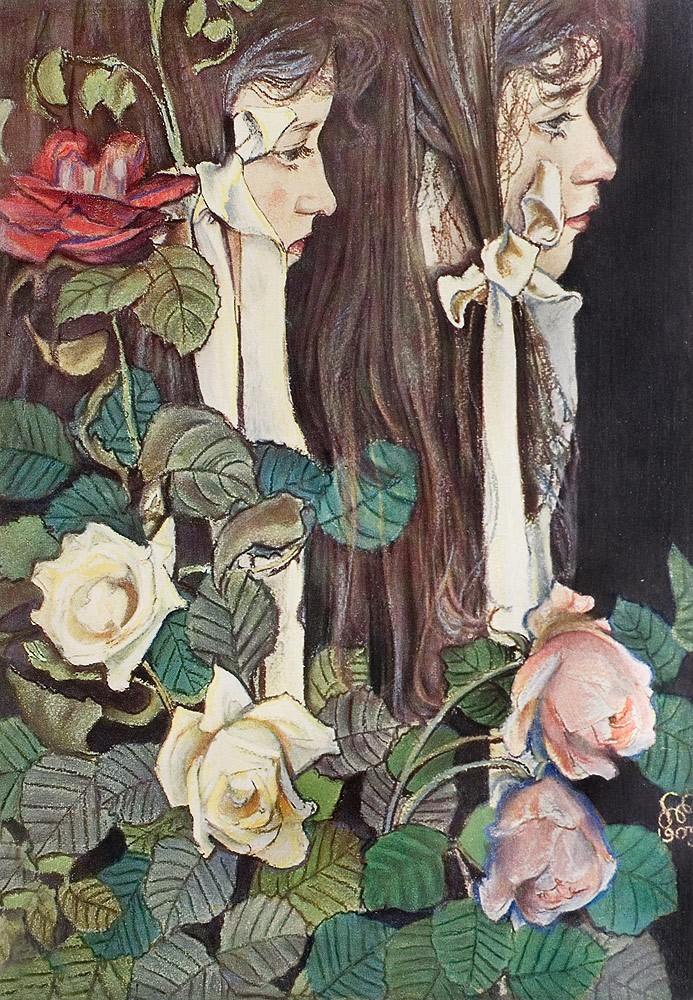
Stanisław Wyspiański, Double portrait of Eliza Pareńska (1905)

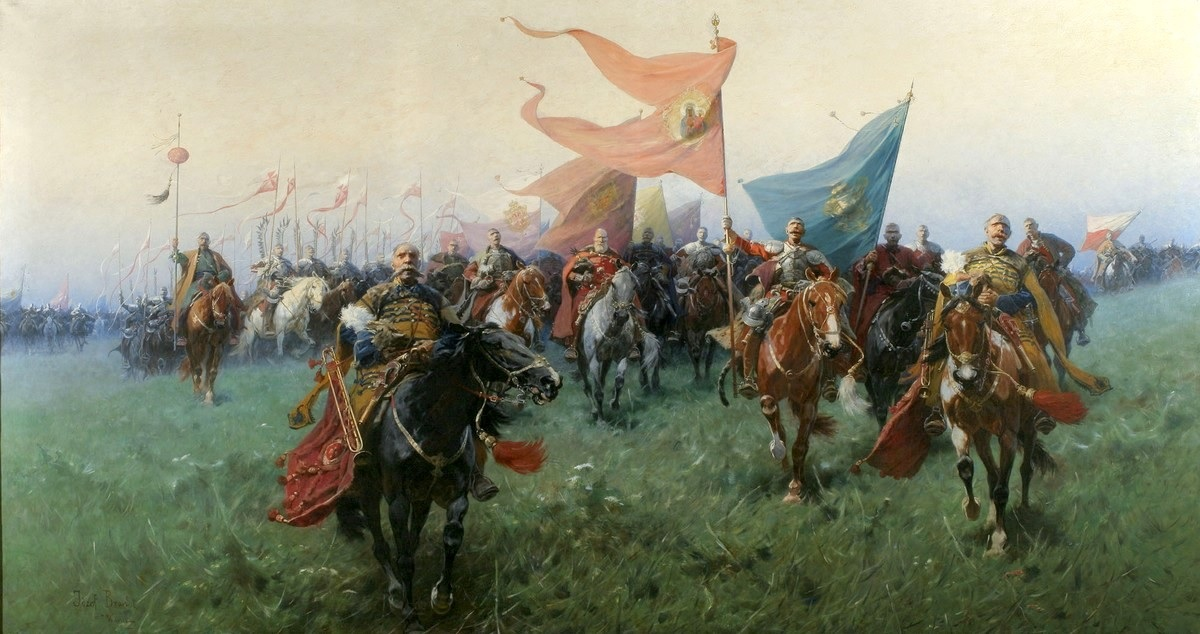
Józef Brandt, Bogurodzica (1909)

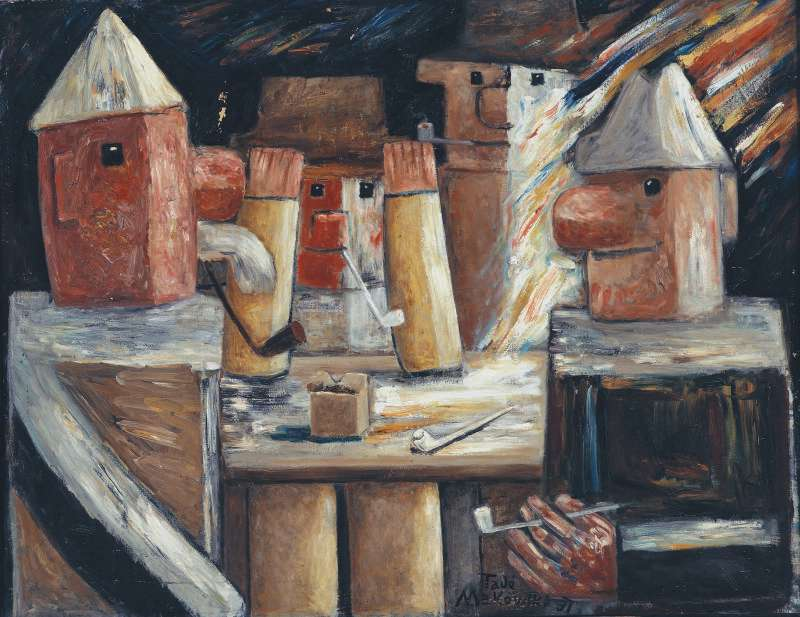
Tadeusz Makowski, The Pipe Smokers (1930)

== Museum divisions ==
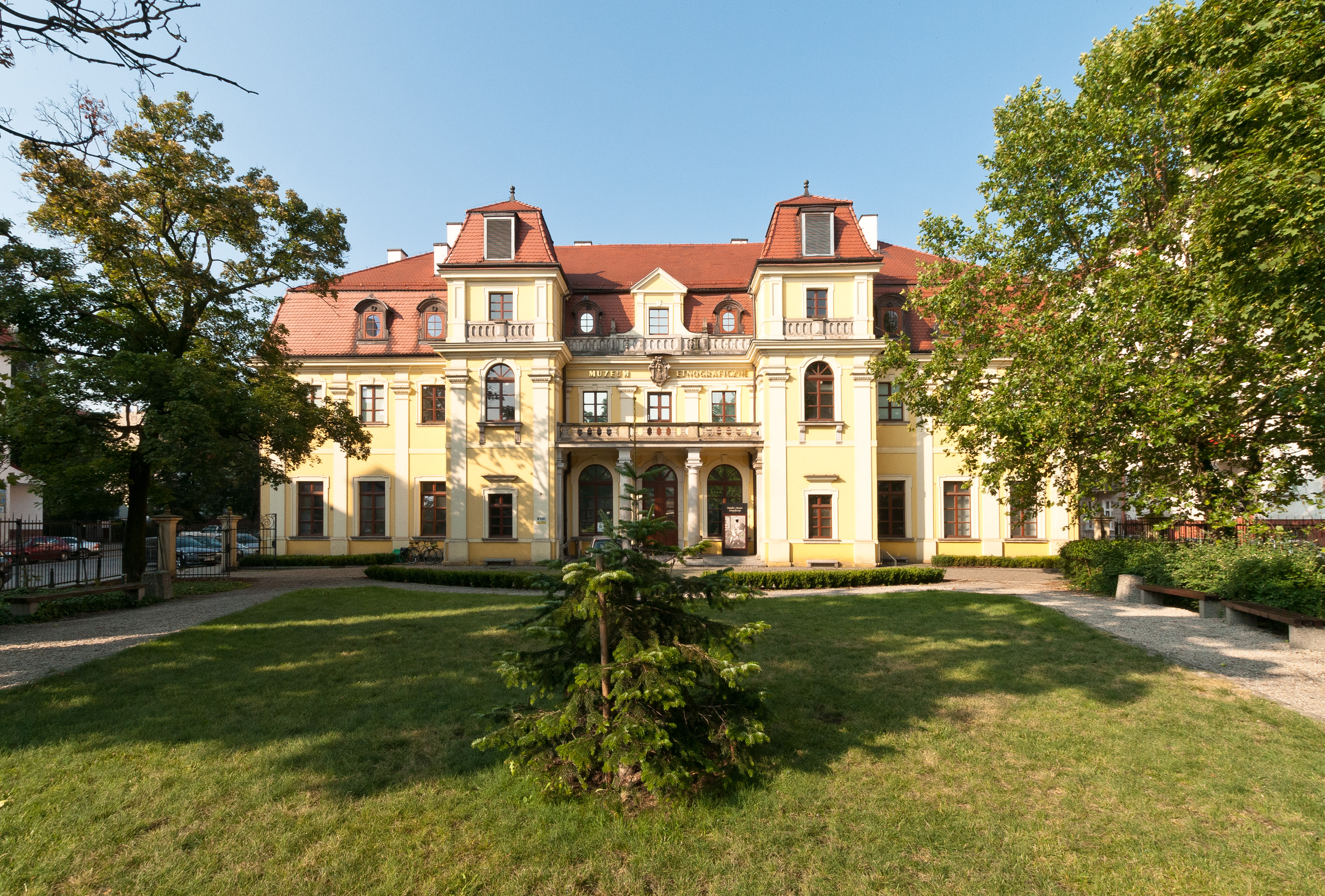
Ethnographic Museum

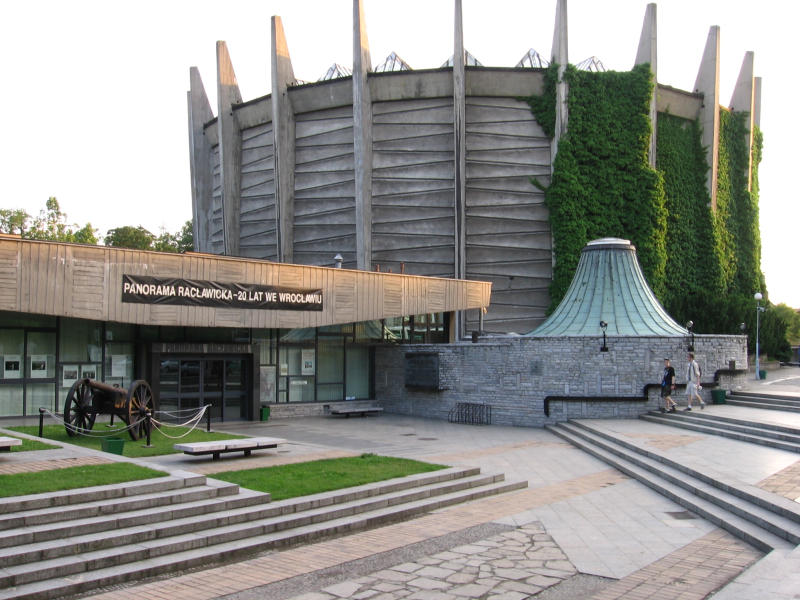
Cyclorama image of the Kościuszko Uprising

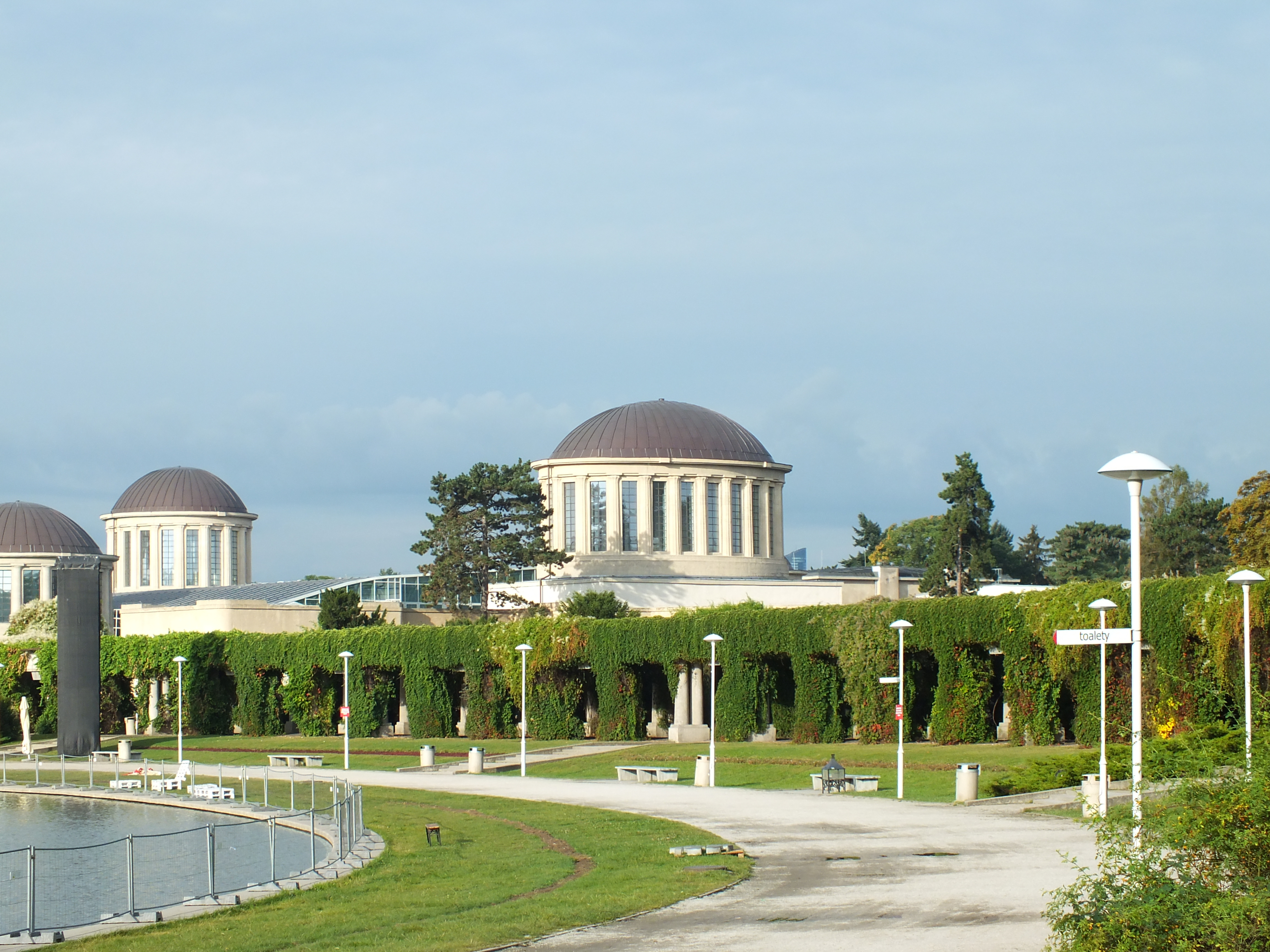
Four Domes Pavilion

- Ethnographic Museum (at the summer Palace of Bishops)
- The Racławice Panorama Museum
- Four Domes Pavilion

== See also ==
- National Museum of Poland
- National Museum, Kraków
- National Museum, Poznań
- National Museum, Warsaw
- List of registered museums in Poland
- Portrait of a Clergyman (Helmich van Thweenhuysen II)

== Notes and references ==
- Media related to National Museum in Wrocław at Wikimedia Commons
