= Blood Ties =

Blood Ties may refer to:

== Film ==
- Blood Ties (1964 film), a Soviet drama
- Blood Ties (1986 film), an Italian-American TV film
- Blood Ties (1991 film), an American horror thriller TV film
- Blood Ties: The Life and Work of Sally Mann, a 1994 documentary
- Blood Ties (2009 film), a Singaporean film
- Blood Ties (2013 film), an American remake of 2008 film Les liens du sang

== Television ==
- Blood Ties (TV series), a 2007 Canadian series
- "Blood Ties", a 2004 episode of Alias (season 3)
- "Blood Ties" (Bad Girls), a 2001 episode
- "Blood Ties" (Buffy the Vampire Slayer), a 2001 episode
- "Blood Ties", a 1999 episode of Diagnosis: Murder (season 6)
- "Blood Ties" (Doctors), a 2000 episode
- "Blood Ties" (Homicide: Life on the Street), a 1997 three-part episode
- "Blood Ties", a 2016 episode of Legends of Tomorrow (season 1)
- "Blood Ties" (Northern Exposure), a 1994 episode

== Novels ==
- Blood Tie, a 1977 novel by Mary Lee Settle
- Blood Ties (McKenzie novel), 2008

== Other uses ==
- Blood Ties, 1995 work by Polish contemporary artist Katarzyna Kozyra
- Blood Ties, 2019 podcast
- Bloodties, a 1993 Marvel Comics crossover

== See also ==
- Blood Relations (disambiguation)
- Consanguinity, the characteristic of having a kinship with a relative who is descended from a common ancestor
