= Tadeusz Makowski =

Polish painter

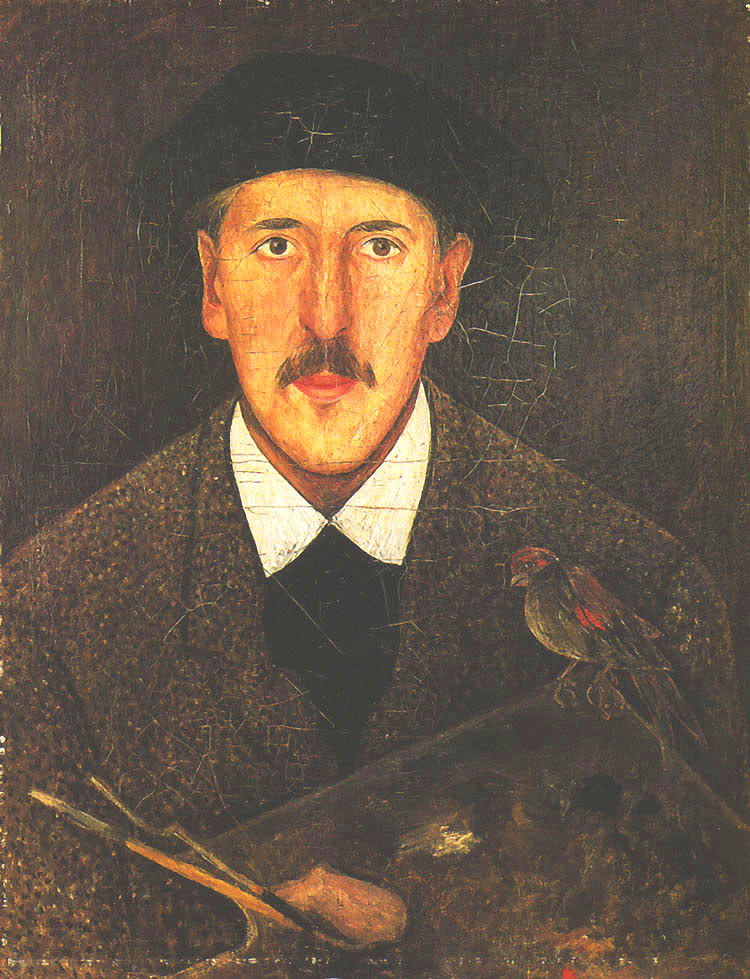
Self-portrait (c.1920, National Museum, Kraków)

Tadeusz Józef Makowski (29 January 1882, Oświęcim – 1 November 1932, Paris) was a Polish painter who worked in France and was associated with the School of Paris.

== Biography ==
From 1902 to 1906, he studied classical philology at the Jagiellonian University. During that time, he also began studying art at the Kraków Academy of Fine Arts with Jan Stanisławski and Józef Mehoffer. Upon completing his courses there in 1908, he moved to Paris, where he would live for the rest of his life.

Originally he painted in the style taught by his professors. Then, he painted some frescoes that attracted the attention of a group of Cubist painters, led by Henri Le Fauconnier, who worked in Montparnasse. This had a decisive influence on his work.

At the invitation of Władysław Ślewiński, he spent the war years in Brittany and would return there several times. These trips inspired him to depart from strict cubism and go back to studying nature; creating many stylized landscapes.

Later, his favorite subjects were carnivals, fairs and children, done in a style inspired by the old Dutch Masters, Polish folk art and naïve art. He also did woodcut book illustrations. During the 1920s, he lived briefly in the Netherlands. From 1912 to 1931, he kept a diary that was published in Warsaw in 1961 by the State Publishing Institute (PIW).

== Selected paintings ==
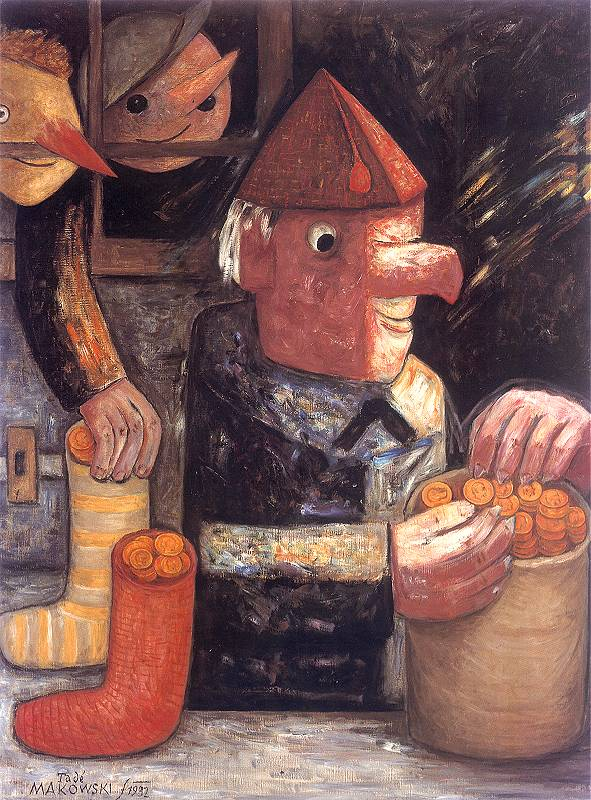
The Miser

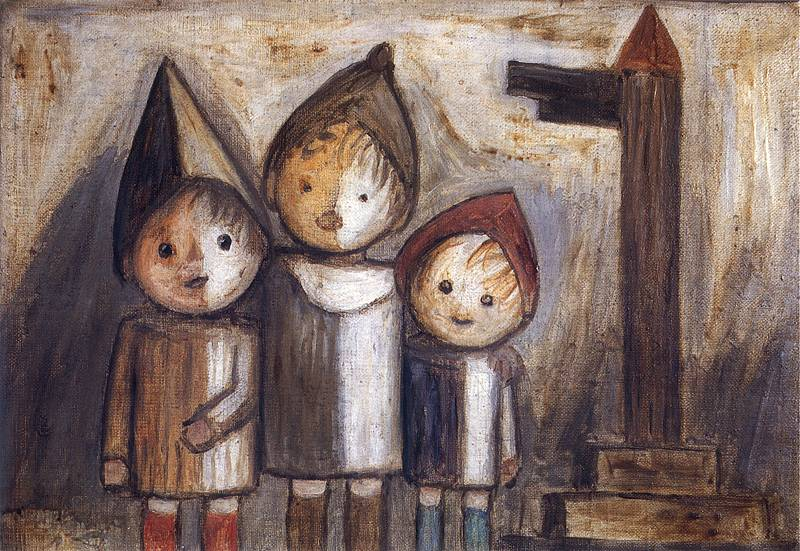
Three Children Near a Road Sign

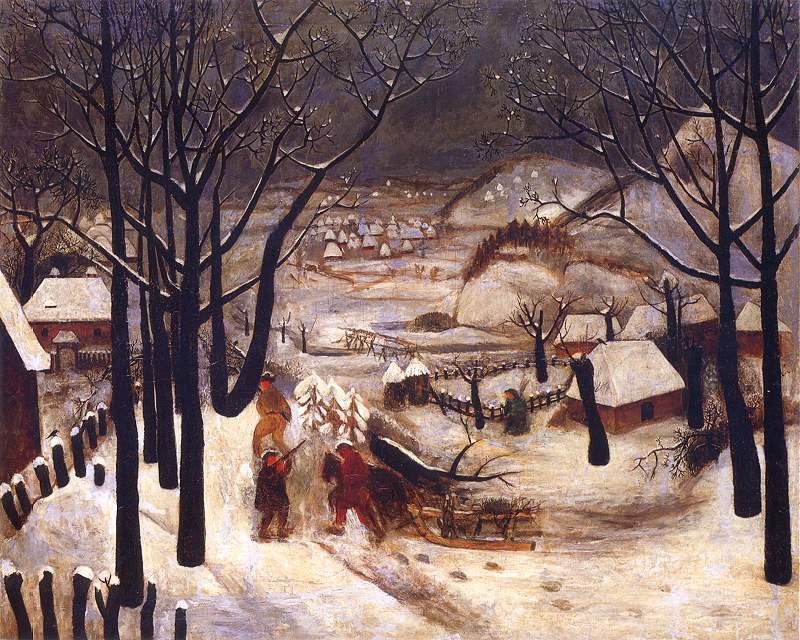
Winter

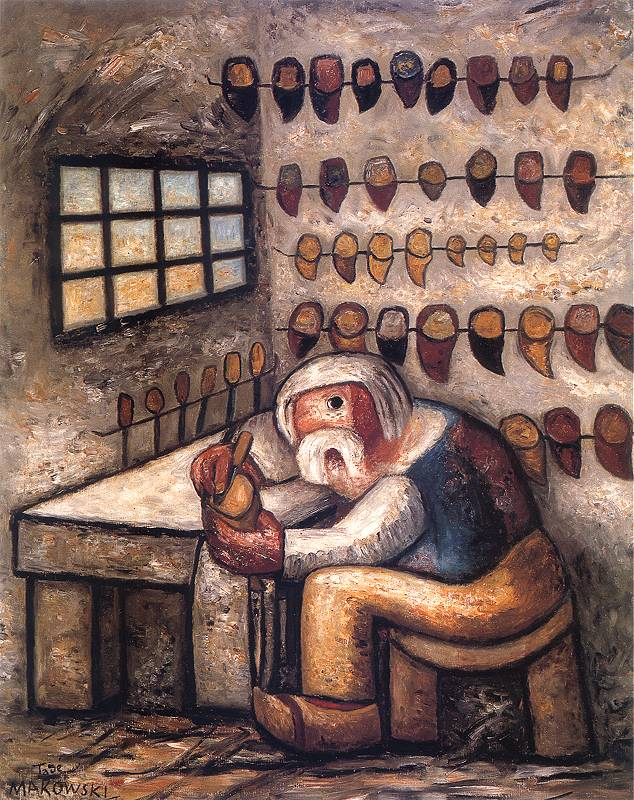
The Shoemaker

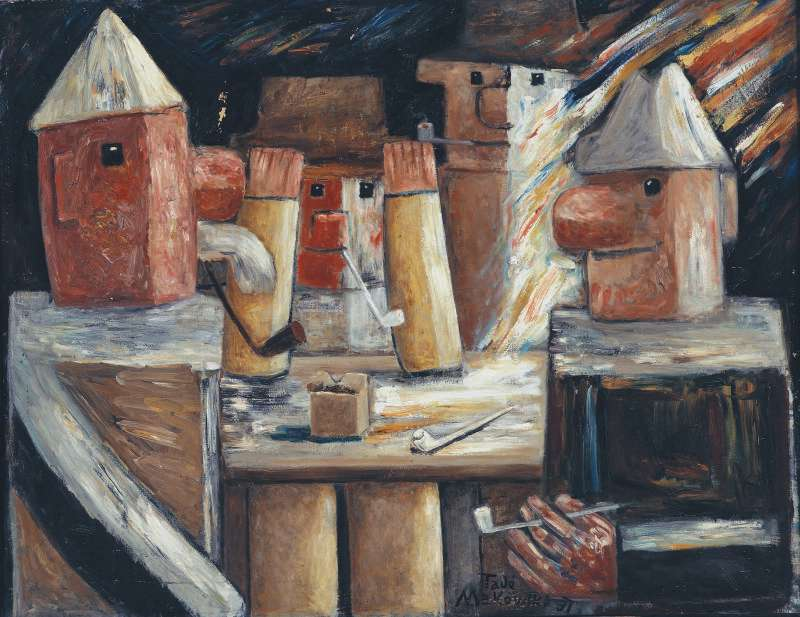
The Pipe Smokers, National Museum, Wrocław
