= Lamentation (School of Lucas Cranach the Elder) =

German Renaissance painting

Lamentation over the Dead Body of Christ (Lamentation)
- Opłakiwanie Chrystusa (Polish), Beweinung des vom Kreuz abgenommenen Christus (German)
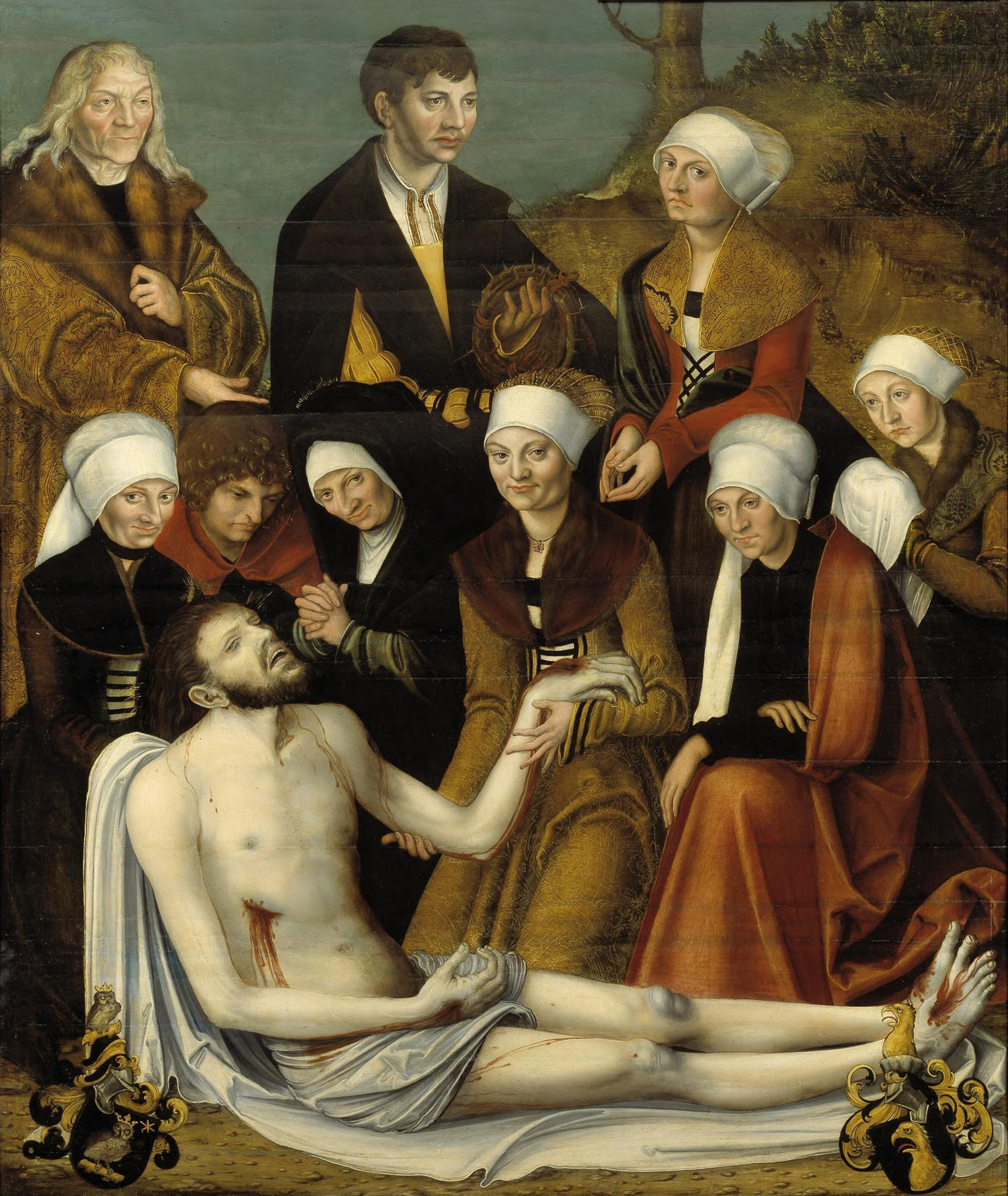
- Artist: School of Lucas Cranach the Elder
- Year: 1538
- Medium: Oil on wood panel
- Movement: German Renaissance
- Subject: Lamentation of Christ
- Dimensions: 156 cm × 131.5 cm (61 in × 51.8 in)
- Location: Muzeum Narodowe, Wrocław (National Museum, Wrocław)

Lamentation over the Dead Body of Christ (known as Lamentation) is an oil painting on wood panel completed by a follower of the German Renaissance artist Lucas Cranach the Elder during the 1530s. It is considered to be among the most valued works of art to have been plundered from Polish collections during World War II.

The painting, which had been in the collection of the Schlesische Museum der Bildenden Künste in Breslau (now National Museum, Wrocław) since 1880, was evacuated in the aftermath of Siege of Breslau in November 1945 and had gone missing by 1946. In 1970, Lamentation entered the collection of the Nationalmuseum in Stockholm. Following a years-long investigation by the Polish government, the painting was officially restituted to the National Museum in Wrocław in 2022.

== Historical background ==
Cranach the Elder (1472–1553) was a leading German Renaissance artist who served as court painter to John Frederick I, Elector of Saxony in Wittenberg around the time Lamentation was completed. Similarly to other Renaissance artists, he maintained a robust workshop. In addition to numerous apprentices, Cranach's workshop in Wittenberg also employed his sons Hans and Lucas Cranach the Younger. Over four hundred paintings are said to have been completed by Cranach and his studio, and distinguishing exact authorship has oftentimes proven difficult. A friend of Martin Luther, Cranach was a major supporter of the Protestant Reformation.

== Analysis ==
The Lamentation of Christ was most likely commissioned by the German merchant Konrad von Günterode and Anna née von Alnpeck, whose coats of arms are placed in the lower half of the composition. In the painting, the two patrons, together with their four children, are depicted as participants in the scene and are seen standing next to the Biblical figures of Virgin Mary, Mary Magdalene and John the Evangelist.

Lamentation of Christ was a popular Renaissance subject matter which allowed artists to capture the highly pious and emotional moment when the body of Jesus had been taken off the cross. The 1538 composition is one of several lamentation paintings completed by Cranach the Elder and his studio during the early decades of the 16th century. Completed in the aftermath of the Reformation, the work is said to emphasize the importance of personal spiritual experience. According to Polish art historian and museum administrator Piotr Oszczanowski, the artist blurs the hierarchy of importance among depicted figures and captures the individuality of their respective religious and emotional responses.

== History of ownership ==
The painting's provenance before the 18th century is only partially documented, and the precise time of its arrival in Poland remains unknown. Sometime in the late 18th century, the painting, titled Opłakiwanie Chrystusa in Polish, entered the collection of the Cistercian monastery in Lubiąż where it remained until its transfer to Schlesische Museum der Bildenden Künste in Breslau (now National Museum, Wrocław) in 1880. The painting stayed in the museum's collection until the end of World War II. After the months-long Siege of Breslau and the subsequent Nazi capitulation in May 1945, Lamentation was removed from the museum in November that year, designated as one of the artworks to be placed at the Kamieniec Ząbkowicki Palace near Wrocław for safekeeping. The list comprised 252 works of art with Lamentation included as position no. 28 with an annotation "S.H.K 125," indicating the abbreviated name of the Breslau museum and its inventory number.

By February 1946, hundreds of works stored in the palace had gone missing. Many of these, including Lamentation, would later re-emerge in Mariefred, Sweden as belonging to the Swedish businessman Sigfrid Häggberg. According to his family, however, Häggberg had not directly participated in the theft and was merely safekeeping the painting on behalf of an unidentified individual. After his death in 1963, the painting was sold to the Nationalmuseum in Stockholm at an auction in 1970 for SEK 4,000 (~US$3,700 in 2023 when adjusted for inflation) and placed in the museum's permanent collection.

=== Restitution to Poland ===
In 2020, following an extensive and lengthy investigation by the Ministry of Culture and National Heritage in Poland, the Nationalmuseum in Stockholm recommended that Lamentation be restituted to the National Museum in Wrocław. In 2022, the painting was officially returned. According to Susanna Pettersson, the Director General of the Nationalmuseum in Stockholm, the case illustrated the importance of investing in "provenance research and restitution."

== Sources ==
- "The Lamentation". Cranach Digital Archive. Düsseldorf: Stiftung Museum Kunstpalast.
- "Skradziony podczas II wojny światowej obraz Cranacha wróci do Polski. Znalazł się w szwedzkim muzeum" [Cranach painting stolen during the Second World War will return to Poland. It turned up in a Swedish museum]. Gazeta.pl (in Polish). 24 June 2020.
- Hand, John Oliver (1993). "Lucas Cranach the Elder, 1472–1553". German Paintings of the Fifteenth through Seventeenth Centuries (PDF). The Collections of the National Gallery of Art Systematic Catalogue. With the assistance of Sally E. Mansfield. Washington, D.C.: National Gallery of Art; Cambridge University Press. ISBN 0-89468-188-5.
- Harris, Gareth (23 June 2020). "National museum in Stockholm to return stolen 16th-century painting to Poland". The Art Newspaper.
- King, Donald; Thöne, Friedrich (n.d.). "Lucas Cranach, the Elder". Encyclopædia Britannica.
- Kuc, Monika (31 January 2022). "Muzeum Narodowe we Wrocławiu odzyskało obraz zaginiony podczas wojny" [The National Museum in Wrocław has recovered a painting lost during the war]. Rzeczpospolita (in Polish).
- Lamparska, Joanna (2022). Ostatni świadek. Historie strażników hitlerowskich skarbów [The Last Witness: Stories of the Guardians of Nazi Treasures] (in Polish). Kraków: Znak Koncept. ISBN 978-83-240-8426-5.
- Pettersson, Susanna (June 2020). "Time to focus on provenance research and restitution". Nationalmuseum. Stockholm.
- Pyclik, Paweł (31 January 2022). "Odzyskano obraz 'Opłakiwanie Chrystusa' L. Cranacha. Strata wojenna wróciła do Polski" [The painting 'Lamentation of Christ' by L. Cranach has been recovered. The war loss returned to Poland]. RMF24 (in Polish).
- Tomczyńska, Agata (31 January 2022). "Utracony podczas wojny obraz 'Opłakiwanie Chrystusa' z warsztatu Cranacha wrócił do Wrocławia" [The painting 'Lamentation of Christ' from Cranach's workshop, lost during the war, has returned to Wrocław]. dzieje.pl (in Polish). Polish Press Agency.
- Webber, Alex (24 June 2020). "Stockholm museum to return 16th-century painting after finding it was stolen at end of war". The First News. Polish Press Agency.
