= Portrait of a Clergyman (Helmich van Thweenhuysen II) =

Painting by Helmich van Tweenhuysen II

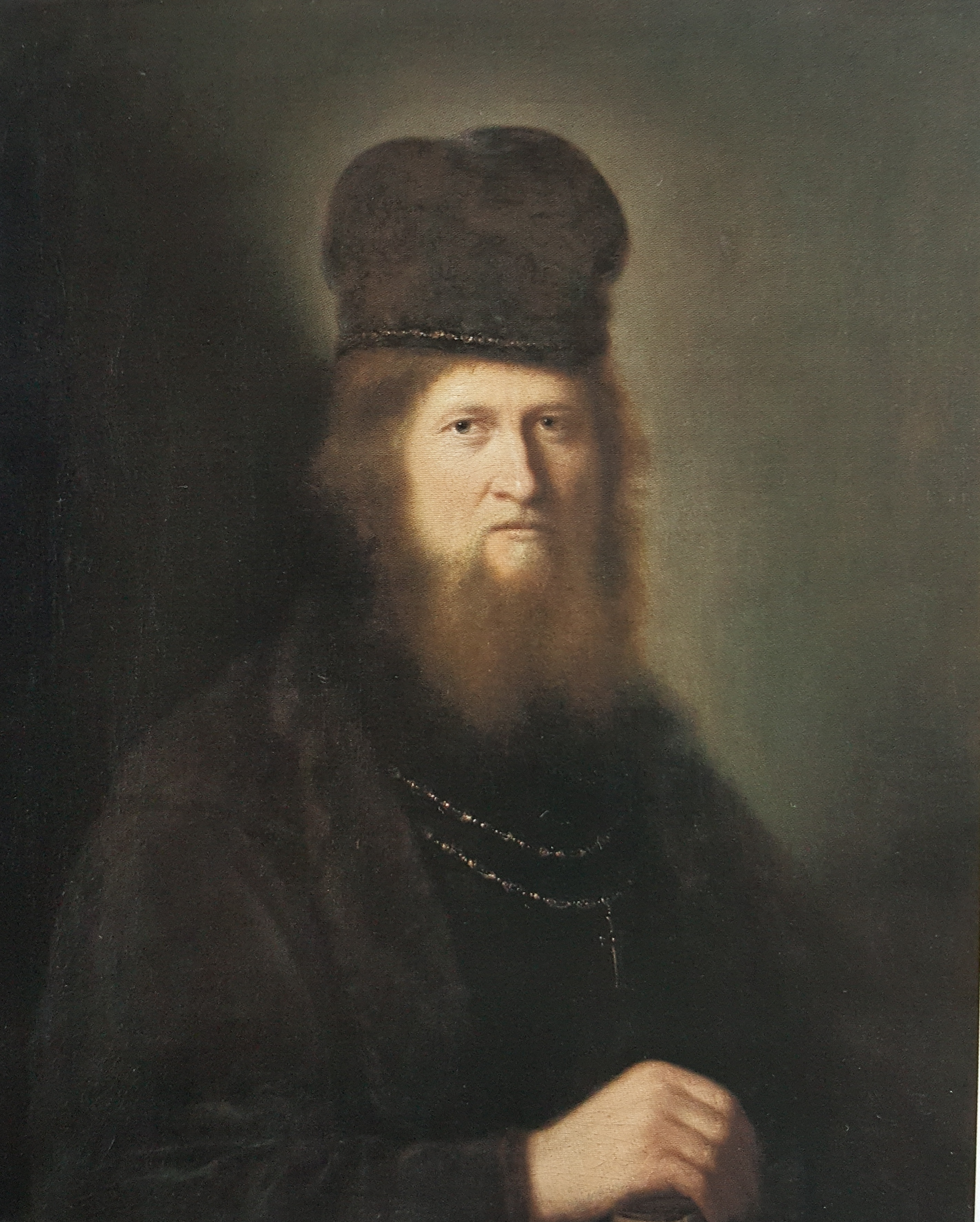
Portrait of a Clergyman (c. 1650) by Helmich van Thweemhuysen

Portrait of a Clergyman is a c. 1650 oil on canvas painting long attributed to Rembrandt but now attributed to Helmich van Thweenhuysen II, a Dutch painter active in Gdańsk. It has been in the National Museum in Wrocław since 1947.

It shows an unknown grey-bearded man against an olive-grey background, with his right hand resting on a book. His cap may mean he was an Eastern Orthodox clergyman, possibly a Greek bishop, and it was previously titled The Greek Bishop. A similar composition is now in Sphinx Fine Art in London.

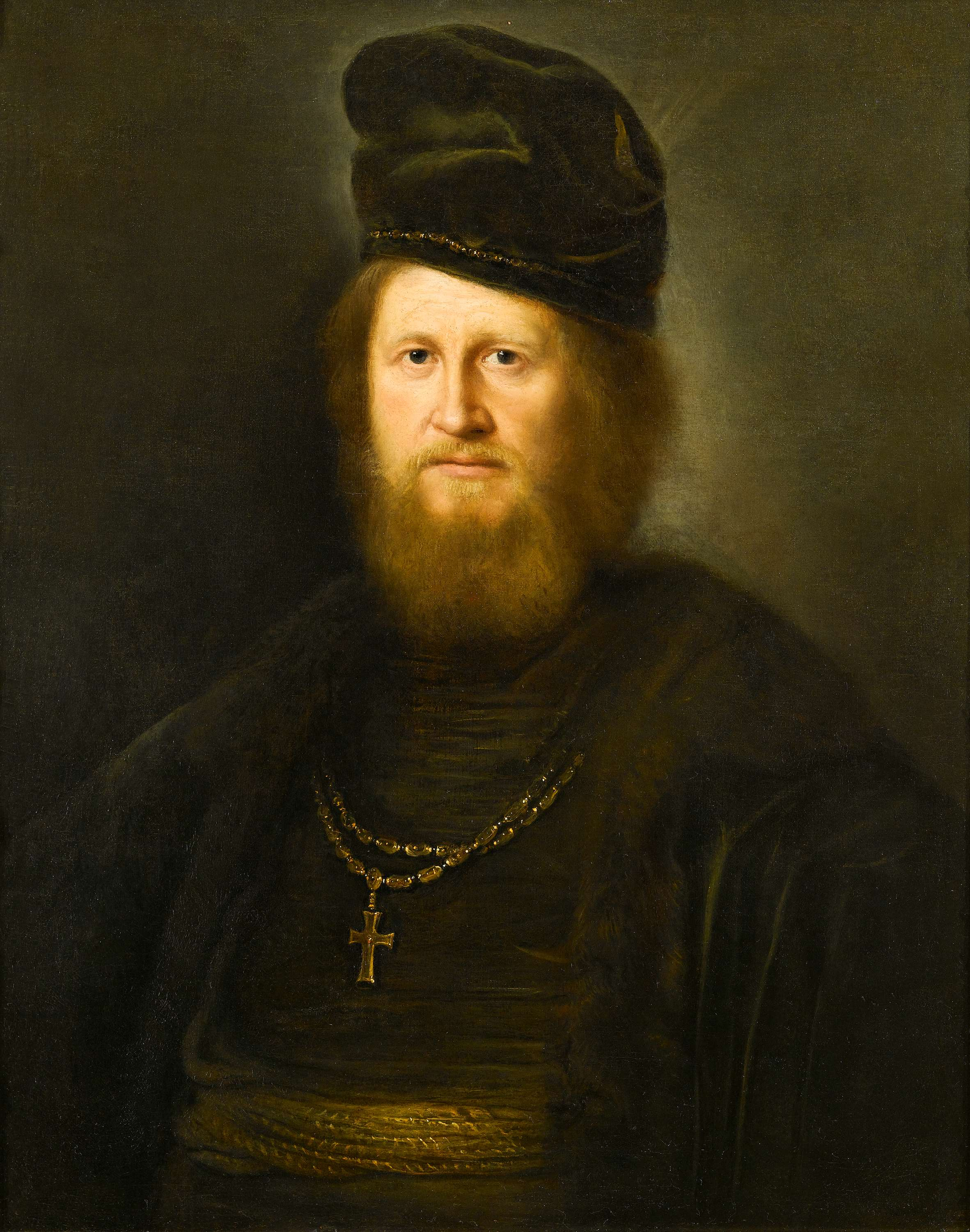
The London copy

It was donated to the church of św. Elżbiety in Wrocław by city councillor Anton Götz von Schwanenfliess in 1708 as a Rembrandt. It was reattributed to Rembrandt's pupil Ferdinand Bol during the 19th century, then to a German follower of Rembrandt in an 1879 catalogue of the Museum of Fine Arts in Wrocław. In 1855 it was moved to the Ständehaus on Krupnicza Street and in 1879 to the Silesian Museum of Fine Arts (Schlesisches Museum der bildenden Künste) as inventory number 259).

In 1903 it was moved again, this time to the Silesian Museum of Artistic Crafts and Antiquities (Schlesisches Museum für Kunstgewerbe und Altertümer) as inventory number 396: 04. From 1945 to 1947 it was cared for by Wrocław's Department of Museums and Monuments Protection, before being transferred to its present home in 1947 of the city of Wrocław before moving to its present home.

In 1973, by reading letters discovered on the canvas by Bożena Steinborn, the work was reattributed again, this time to the painter known as the HvT Monogramist. Steinborn argued that the work resembled the style of Christoph Paudis. Its present attribution was assigned in 1994 by Lech Borusewicz
