= Blood Relations =

Blood relation refers to a blood relationship between individuals sharing consanguinity or biological kinship.

Blood Relations or Blood Relation may also refer to:

- Blood Relations (Pollock play), a play by Sharon Pollock, based on the life of Lizzie Borden
- Blood Relations (Malouf play), a 1987 play by David Malouf
- Blood Relations: Chosen Families in Buffy the Vampire Slayer and Angel, an academic book analyzing the two television series
- Blood Relations (film), a 1988 Canadian horror film
- Blood Relation (film), a 1963 South Korean film
- Khoon Ka Rishta (lit. 'Blood Relation'), a 1981 Indian Hindi-language film
- "Blood Relation" (Medium), an episode from season three of the American television series, Medium
- An episode of Criminal Minds
- Blood Relations: Menstruation and the Origins of Culture, a 1991 book by Chris Knight

== See also ==
- Blood Ties (disambiguation)
