= Blood Ties (photograms) =

Series of four large-scale photograms by Katarzyna Kozyra

Blood Ties (Polish: Więzy krwi) is a series of four large-scale, color photograms by Polish contemporary artist Katarzyna Kozyra, created in 1995. The work is part of the critical art movement. The photograms depict two nude women lying against the backdrop of two red symbols: a cross and a crescent. The images are arranged to form a square with a side length of 4 meters.

The work was first exhibited in 1995 at the Ujazdowski Castle Centre for Contemporary Art in Warsaw as part of the Antibodies exhibition. In 1999, the AMS Outdoor Gallery planned to display two of the four photographs as large-scale posters on billboards, but the initiative was canceled following protests from politicians and representatives of the Catholic Church.

The theme of Blood Ties centers on women as victims of wars fought over religious differences, with the cross and crescent symbolizing Christianity and Islam, as well as humanitarian aid. The work was inspired by the war in the former Yugoslavia ongoing in 1995.

== Description ==
A	B
C	D

The four photograms, each measuring 2x2 meters, are arranged to form a 4-meter square, as illustrated in the diagram on the right.

The individual photograms depict:

- A – Kozyra's sister lying on a red crescent. The background is white. The model is nude and has one leg amputated below the knee.
- B – Kozyra posing in the upper right section of a large red Greek cross. The artist appears thin and emaciated, with visible signs of illness.
- C – Kozyra's sister lying in the center of a red Greek cross, with the background filled with cabbages instead of being white, unlike photogram A.
- D – Kozyra lying in the lower part of a red crescent, with the right side of the photograph filled with cauliflowers.

== Significance ==
The work addresses women as victims of war. Katarzyna Kozyra stated that the concept was inspired by the Balkan conflict at the time. The cross and crescent symbolize two major religions – Christianity and Islam – as well as humanitarian aid through the International Red Cross and Red Crescent Movement. In Blood Ties, these symbols represent fratricidal wars driven by religious differences. The cabbages and cauliflowers allude to both nature and fertility, as well as agricultural fields transformed into mass graves for victims of war crimes. Kozyra highlights the plight of women victims in the former Yugoslavia, whose suffering is both individual and shared across both sides of the conflict.

Art historian Małgorzata Lisiewicz argues that the work contrasts the exposed, vulnerable bodies of the sisters with the dominant religious symbols, which are prominent due to their size and color. The kinship between the women serves as a protest against male authority that uses religion as a tool for domination, with the blood ties between the sisters countering "fraternal" rivalry.

== Exhibitions ==
=== In Poland ===
The photograms were first displayed at the Ujazdowski Castle Centre for Contemporary Art during the Antibodies exhibition, held from 7 July to 13 August 1995. The curator was Robert Rumas, with collaboration from Ewa Gorządek and the Wyspa Progress Foundation in Gdańsk. A sign at the entrance warned: "This exhibition presents matters of the human body in ways that may cause objections. Visitors, especially parents accompanied by children, are asked to consider this".

In 1996, Blood Ties was shown at the private "a.r.t." gallery in Płock. It was also exhibited at the collective exhibition Woman on Woman at the Galeria Bielska BWA in Bielsko-Biała, from 20 September to 20 October. The work was exhibited twice at the Łaźnia Centre for Contemporary Art in Gdańsk.

The series was part of a monographic exhibition of Kozyra's work at the National Museum in Kraków, open from 15 November 2011 to 15 January 2012, curated by Hanna Wróblewska and Anna Budzałek. Posters promoting the exhibition featured Blood Ties.

=== Abroad ===
Kozyra's photographs were included in several international group exhibitions. From 3 to 19 September 1995, they were part of the "Kiev Art Meeting. New Art from Poland, Ukraine, Russia" at the Alipiy Gallery in Kyiv, Ukraine, curated by Valeriy Sakharuk. The work was also shown at the "Polish! Contemporary Art from Poland" exhibition at Künstlerhaus Bethanien in Berlin, from 21 October to 13 November 2011. Additionally, from 4 June to 26 November 2011, it was featured in the "PARTICOLARE. Percorsi di Democrazia" exhibition at Palazzo Donà in Venice. Earlier, from 13 October 2010 to 15 January 2011, Blood Ties was displayed in Dresden at the "Von Fahnen, Farbbeuteln und Fixierungen. Zur Natur der Farbe im Politischen Raum" exhibition, organized by the Riesa-efau association.

== Billboard display ==
In 1999, the series was submitted to the AMS Outdoor Gallery, with the idea to display it on 400 billboards across Polish cities, proposed by curator and gallery founder Marek Krajewski. Two photographs (C and D in the diagram) were selected for display starting 15 May 1999 as part of the gallery's fifth edition. The cost of printing and installing the posters was estimated at 90,000 PLN. The gallery also planned to distribute 10,000 free postcards featuring Kozyra's photographs.

The display was intended to reference the ongoing Kosovo conflict and coincide with the International Association of Art Critics meetings held in Warsaw and Kraków in late May and early June.

=== Reactions and protests ===
Before the posters were displayed, an article titled Kozyra the Scandalist for Kosovo appeared in Gazeta Wyborcza, announcing the gallery's plans in a sensational tone. It mentioned a supposed ban by the mayor of Gdańsk, despite no such ban existing at the time. This article triggered widespread protests. Politicians, Catholic Church hierarchs, and the Polish Red Cross opposed the display. MP Antoni Szymański (AWS) argued that the symbols belonged to a charitable organization and their use could trivialize the red cross and crescent. MP Joanna Fabisiak (AWS) organized groups to paint over the posters. In the Tricity area, the posters were not displayed, partly due to AWS MP Czesław Nowak, who saw Satanic symbolism in the work because one image depicted a woman hanging upside down. Gdańsk mayor Paweł Adamowicz also expressed skepticism, stating that such art was unsuitable for public display. One politician sought support from Islamic countries' embassies, but was told the diplomats appreciated Kozyra's work.

The newspaper Życie reported that Łódź governor Michał Kasiński filed a complaint with the prosecutor to prevent the desecration of religious symbols, arguing that the posters could insult the cross for Christians and the crescent for Muslims. In Życie, Paweł Paliwoda wrote: "Kozyra's new 'artistic' manifesto is a mixture of complete ignorance about Kosovo (...), sentimental chatter about peace disarms human rights defenders and always serves criminals".

The Conference of the Episcopate's spokesperson Adam Schulz stated that the poster "misuses the symbols of two great religions" and that the artist's intentions were unclear. Bishop Tadeusz Pieronek criticized the work, arguing that the cross and crescent were not suitable for provocation. Further controversy arose because the display was planned during Pope John Paul II's visit from 5 to 17 June 1999.

=== Aftermath of protests ===
Following the protests, the AMS Outdoor Gallery, in agreement with Kozyra, decided to cover the female figures on the billboards already installed (only in Warsaw and Poznań). The photographs were deemed potentially blasphemous toward Christianity and Islam. The posters were covered on the night of 17–18 May, three days after their installation. In a 2007 interview, Kozyra revealed she had little choice: "If I had said they couldn't cover them, they would have covered everything, but this way only the white parts. I had no say". AMS issued a statement to the media: "By covering the poster, we primarily wanted to avoid discussing the work's message in a scandalous atmosphere. Its theme is too serious to address Blood Ties in this way".

Supporters of Kozyra's work, including parts of the art community, criticized the gallery's decision. According to Piotr Piotrowski, the gallery engaged in self-censorship by yielding to political pressure. The Index 73 recorded the event in its Chronicle of Censorship Incidents in Polish Art After 1989.

In 2000, organizers of the second Poznań Photography Biennale planned to display Kozyra's photographs in Poznań's Old Market Square, but city authorities rejected the proposal, citing the work's scandalous nature.
