= Katarzyna Kozyra =

Polish video artist

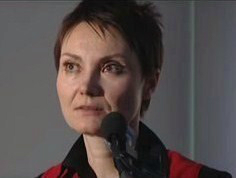
- Katarzyna Kozyra in 2007
- Born: February 1, 1963 (age 63); Warsaw, Poland
- Education: University of Warsaw; Academy of Fine Arts in Warsaw; Hochschule für Grafik und Buchkunst Leipzig
- Awards: Paszport Polityki
- Website: katarzynakozyra.pl

Katarzyna Kozyra (born 1963) is a Polish video artist. She studied German studies at the University of Warsaw (1985–1988). In 1993, she also graduated from the Academy of Fine Arts in Warsaw where she studied sculpture and Hochschule für Graphik und Buchkunst in Leipzig. Kozryra received a Paszport Polityki award in 1997 as the most promising artist in Poland. Since 1997, she has exhibited internationally at museums venues including Brown University and Carnegie International in the U.S.

Her art was involved in a 1999 censorship incident in Poland. Her photo portrait of Slawomir Belina in a Warsaw exhibition in 2000 was also controversial for its alleged eroticism, as his anus was in the centre of the composition.

In 2003, Kozyra had received a DAAD grant, and later developed a new form of performance involving operatic singing.

In 1999, she represented Poland in the 48th Venice Biennale where she won an honorable mention and commendation for video installation "Men’s Bathhouse". In September 2011 she received the Polish Ministry of Culture and National Heritage grant.

== Artistic activity ==
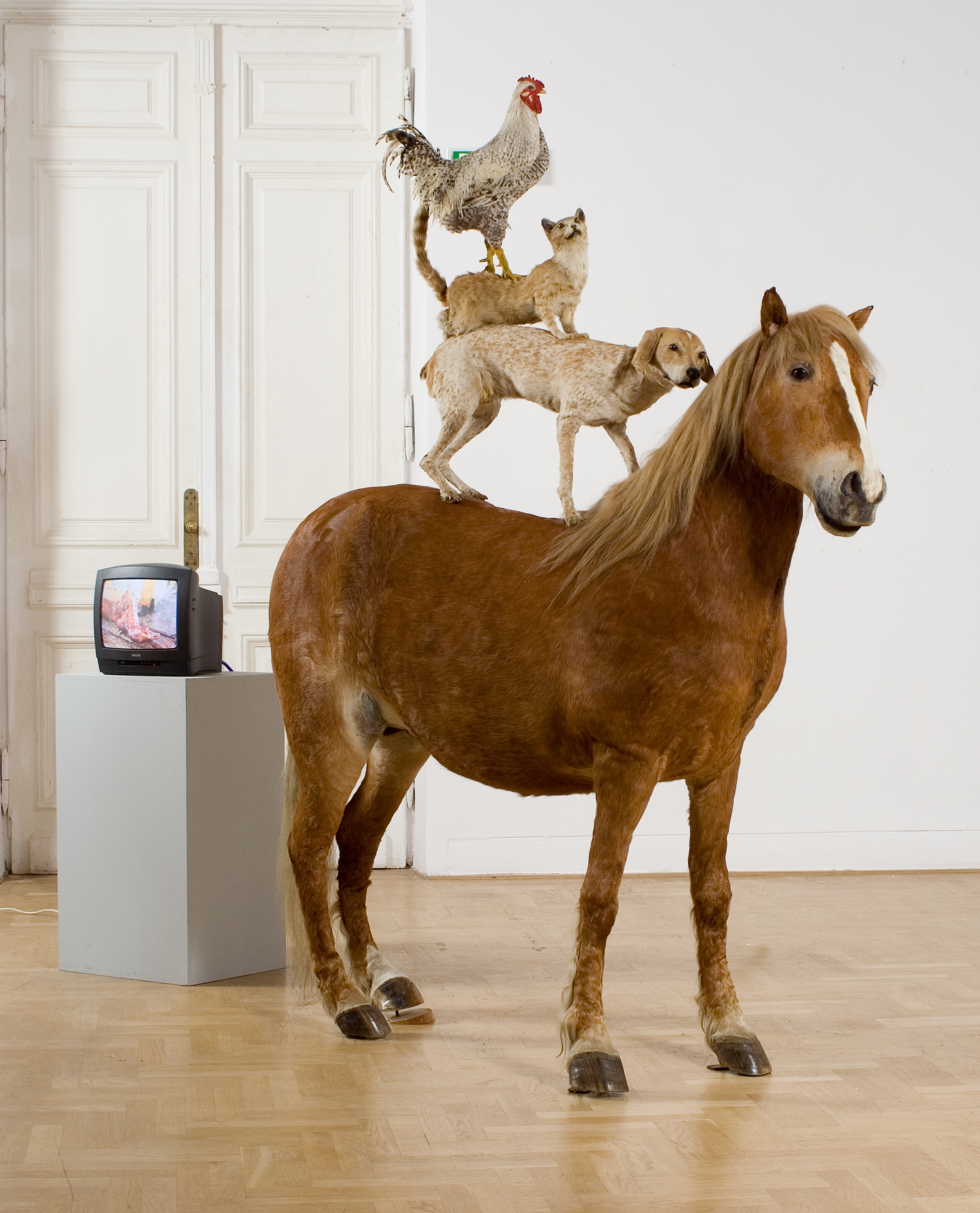
Pyramid of Animals, 1993, Zachęta National Gallery of Art.

"Pyramid of Animals" was her 1993 graduate piece, which became a sensation and "object of violent controversy" in Poland at the time. The piece consisted of the dissected and taxidermied animal bodies of a horse, dog, cat, and rooster and a video depicting the killing of the horse. While quoting a theme from Grimm Brother's fairy tale The Bremen Town Musicians, the work concerns human involvement in industrial animal killing procedure and the normalization of murder when part of the food chain. It was also said that this piece wasn't just, "a work about animals, but a work about death, about killing, and their significance in present day culture". Kozyra became known as a controversial artist because of the notoriety with the installation, but also because of her other works: "Blood Ties" (1995), "Olympia" (1996), "Bathhouse" (1997), and "Man’s Bathhouse" (1999).

In "Olympia" (1996), Kozyra put her fight with cancer and the taboo of naked female bodies on display. As an attempt to restore dignity to an ailing, moribund body by exposing social stereotypes of the aging female body, Kozyra juxtaposed Édouard Manet’s “Olympia” (1863), an image of a healthy, strong, and beautiful body, with her own chemotherapy treatment. It was a protest against the belief that body illnesses or senility doom its owner to social invisibility. Included in the work are a photographic triptych of Olympia and a video of Kozyra's treatment. The first image shows Kozyra lying in the same pose as Manet's "Olympia", but her body is not meant to be the object of desire as with Manet's work, but, instead is pale, hairless, and unhealthy. The second image depicts Kozyra naked on a hospital bed– she is completely hairless and the effects of the chemotherapy are obvious. The third image shows an old woman sitting on a bed – she is alone. Her body is flabby and she has really saggy breasts. Her face is wrinkled all over and it seems that all her teeth are gone. At the same time she looks really calm – like she would reconcile with her fate. The women in all the photographs have one thing in common – black ribbon wrapped around the neck to symbolizes mourning and to hearken back to the work by Manet. The most scandalous element is not presenting the female nude as itself, but presenting the reality of life, illness, and death; that the female body is not just a thing of beauty and admiration of the male gaze.

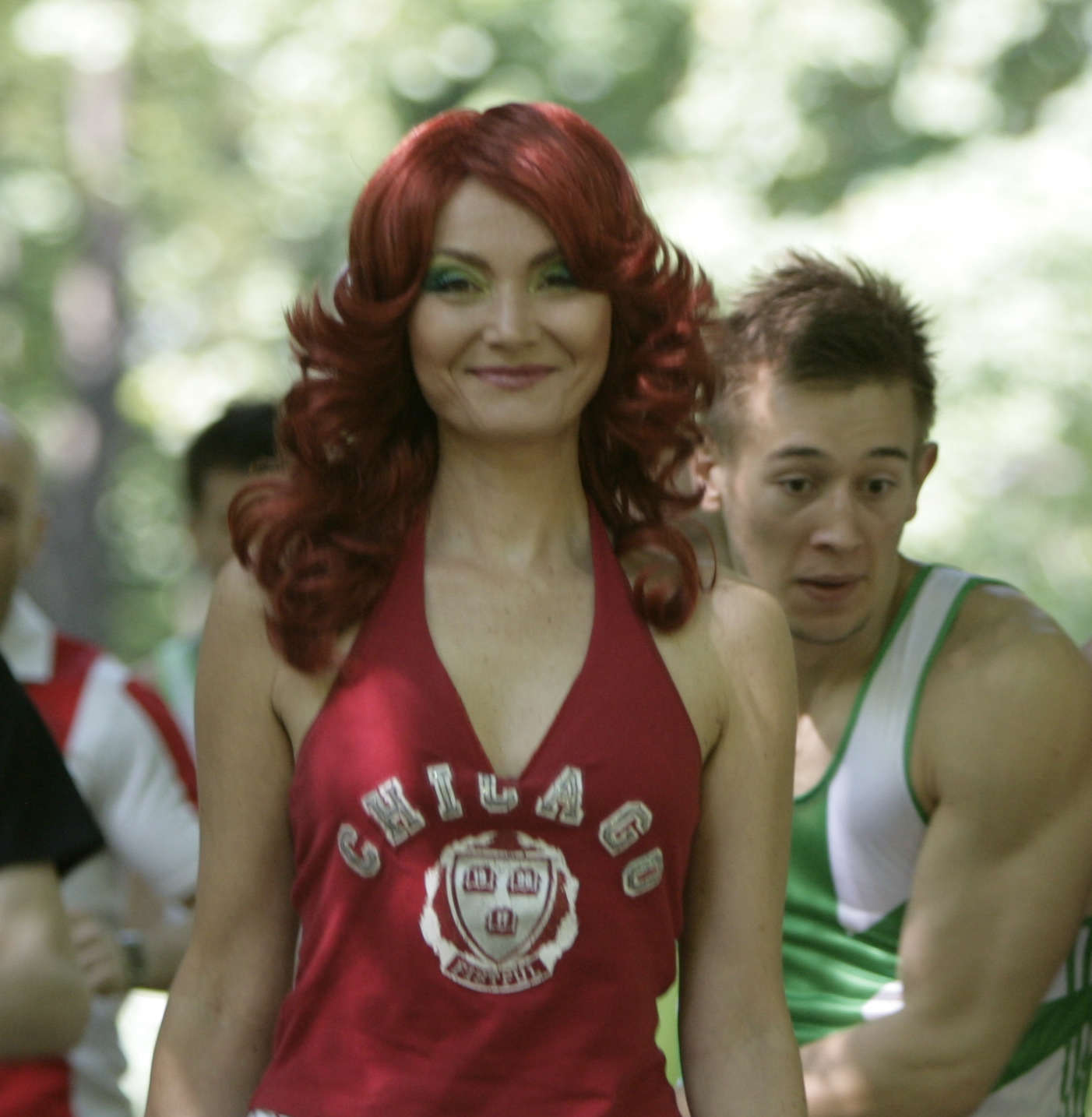
Cheerleaderka/Cheerleader by Katarzyna Kozyra from the permanent collection of Zachęta National Gallery of Art (Warsaw, Poland)

"Bathhouse" (1997) considers similar subject matter. Kozyra's intention was to show how women really appear in situation where nobody is looking and when they don't need to follow beauty canons. Kozyra was able to document this natural behavior by shooting her work with a hidden video camera. By doing this, she presented the female body as is and encouraged the viewers to go against their previous ideals and standards of beauty. Additionally, it was an allusion to the history of art, with works of Rembrandt and Jean Ingres opening and closing the video.

"Man’s Bathhouse" (1999) was a confrontation with and continuation of "Bathhouse". Kozyra went into a men's bathhouse with fake penis attached to her and a towel hung on her shoulders covering the breasts. Surprisingly she found out, that men even when being alone they still focus on their appearance, peer at each other, and compare.

"The Rite of Spring" (1999–2002) was a video installation inspired by the choreography for Igor Stravinsky's 1913 ballet of the same name. Kozyra used former dancers from the Polish National Ballet who were no longer able to dance for this work. Kozyra photographed the elderly subjects lying on the ground in dance positions and then animated their movements.

Kozrya has been working on her "In Art Dreams Become True" series since 2003. The series of visual art, music, and performance is released in phases of the project, each as a separate work although they are intended to be combined in a feature film. In the work, Kozrya is "being manipulated as she strives to fulfill her dream of becoming a "real woman" and an opera singer." In 2011, she received the Award of the Minister of Culture and National Heritage of the Republic of Poland for her artistic accomplishments.

== Controversy ==
Anda Rottenberg, Director of the Zachęta National Gallery of Art in Warsaw where Kozyra first showed "Bath house" in 1997 and who also purchased the work, sparked off controversy by writing to Art Monthly in October 1998 and claiming that Kozyra's "Bath house" and artist Tacita Dean's 1998 "Gellert" were of the same subject: the most famous bathhouse in Budapest. Freely admitting that controversy helps in the promotion of a work, "Controversy around this work was in fact a very stimulating factor and now as the months passed Bath house has come to be regarded as classic", Rottenberg found the coincidence "indeed amazing". However, the works differ completely. Whereas Kozyra used hidden cameras intending to reveal the bathing women's natural behaviour as well as challenging normal considerations of privacy, and is a multi-screen video work (see letter again), Dean had permission from the bath workers and her single screen film is concerned with the healing sulphurous waters of the baths (see Colin Gleadell, The Daily Telegraph, 1 February 2001).
