= Gimnazjalna, Libelta and Szwalbego Streets =

Streets in Bydgoszcz, Poland

Coordinates: 53°07′40″N 18°00′30″E

Gimnazjalna, Karola Libelta, Andrzeja Szwalbego Streets
Bydgoszcz
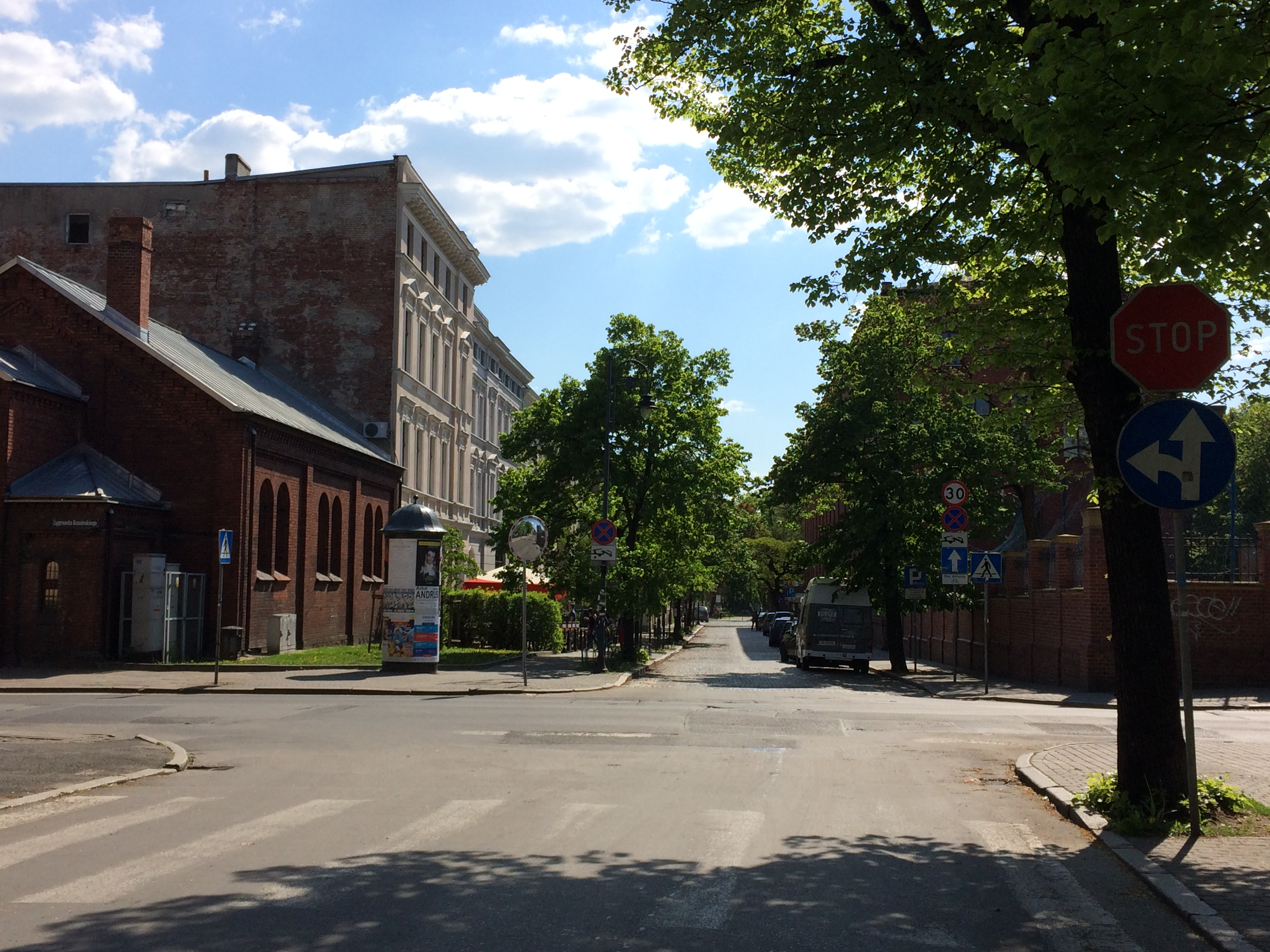
- View of Gimnazjalna street

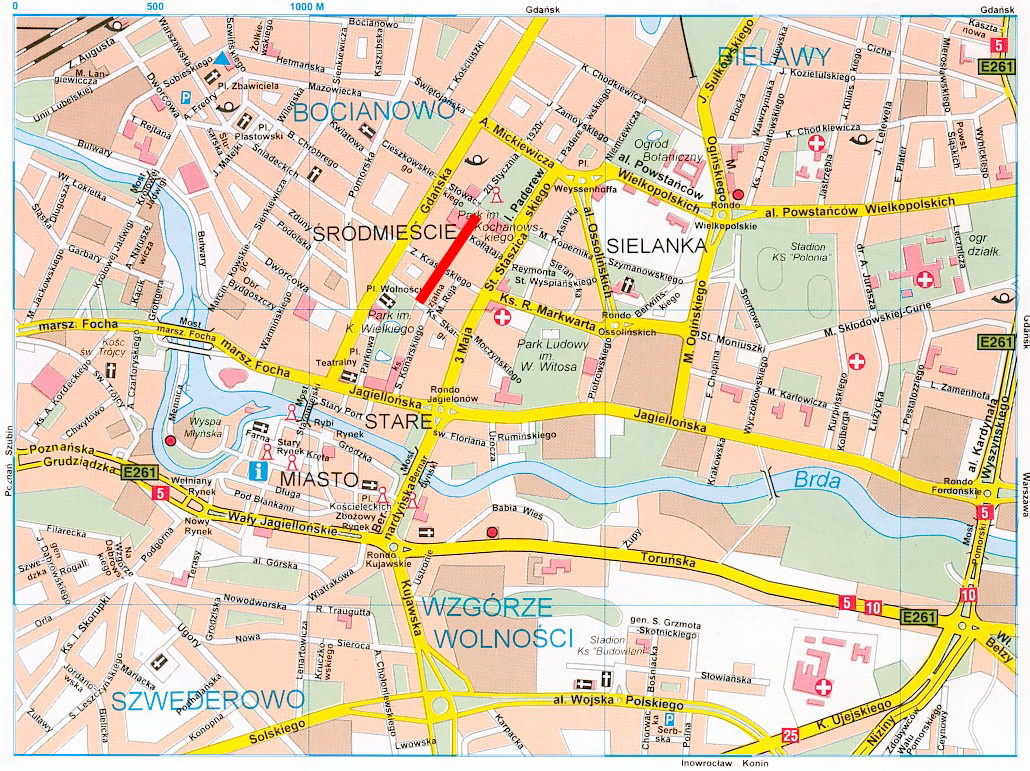
- Location of the 3 streets
- Native name: Ulica Gimnazjalna, Ulica Karola Libelta, Ulica Andrzeja Szwalbego (Polish)
- Former names: Gimnasialstraße, Bachmannstraße, Deinhardtstraße
- Namesake: Gymnasium, Karol Libelt, Andrzej Szwalbe
- Owner: City of Bydgoszcz
- Length: 360 m (1,180 ft); Google maps
- Area: Downtown district
- Location: Bydgoszcz, Poland

Construction
- Construction start: End of 19th century
- Completed: 1900

Gimnazjalna, Libelta and Szwalbego streets are laid in downtown district of the city of Bydgoszcz. Many of the buildings along this axis are either registered on the Kuyavian-Pomeranian Voivodeship heritage list, or part of a quaint architectural ensemble of the city.

== Location ==
The three streets are lined up on a south-west north-east axis in downtown, parallel to Gdańska Street on the west.

Gimnazjalna street (160m long) heads northbound from Plac Wolnosci and ends at the crossing with Krasiński Street.

Libelta street(140m long) starts from this intersection up north till crossing Kołłątaja street.

Szwalbego street is the shortest, only 60 m in length: from the intersection with Kołłątaja street, it heads north east to join the square where stands the Bydgoszcz Pomeranian Philharmonic.

== History ==
The street was originally a track leaving the Weltzin Platz to the north along the 19th-century building of the Gymnasium.

First reference to this path is made on 1876 map by Paul Berthold Jaekel, where a street leaving the Weltzin Platz along the newly built Gymnasium is displayed, without any naming. On the 1880 address book of Bromberg, the appellation "Gymnasialstraße" appears for the first time, with only one reference: the current building at 2 Gimnazjalna.

=== Naming ===
Through history, this axis has borne the following names:

- Gimnazjalna street
  - End 19th century-1920 Gymnasial strasse;
  - 1920–1939, Gimnazjalna Street;
  - 1939–1945, Deinhardtstraße, from Johann Heinrich Deinhardt (1805–1867 in Bromberg), a German educator;
  - since 1945, Gimnazjalna Street.

The name comes from the gymnasium school located in the street.

- Libelta street
  - End 19th century-1905, Gymnasial strasse;
  - 1905–1920, Bachmannstraße;
  - 1920–1939, Libelta street;
  - 1939–1945, Bachmannstraße, from Julius Maximilian Peter Bachmann (1844–1924), a mayor of Bromberg (1878–1890).
  - since 1945, Libelta street.

Patron name comes from Karol Libelt, a Polish philosopher, writer, political and national activist (1807–1875).

- Szwalbego street

This pathway was originally part of Libelta street. In 2007, it received the name of Andrzej Szwalbe (1923–2002), a Polish lawyer, social and cultural activist, first director of Pomeranian Philharmonic (1953–1991).

== Main edifices ==
=== Freedom Square – Polish: Plac Wolnosci ===
Freedom Square stands as an elegant place, ornamented by Art Nouveau buildings, a historical church, a memorial and a green park. This is a location for recreational activities as well as military and official ceremonies.

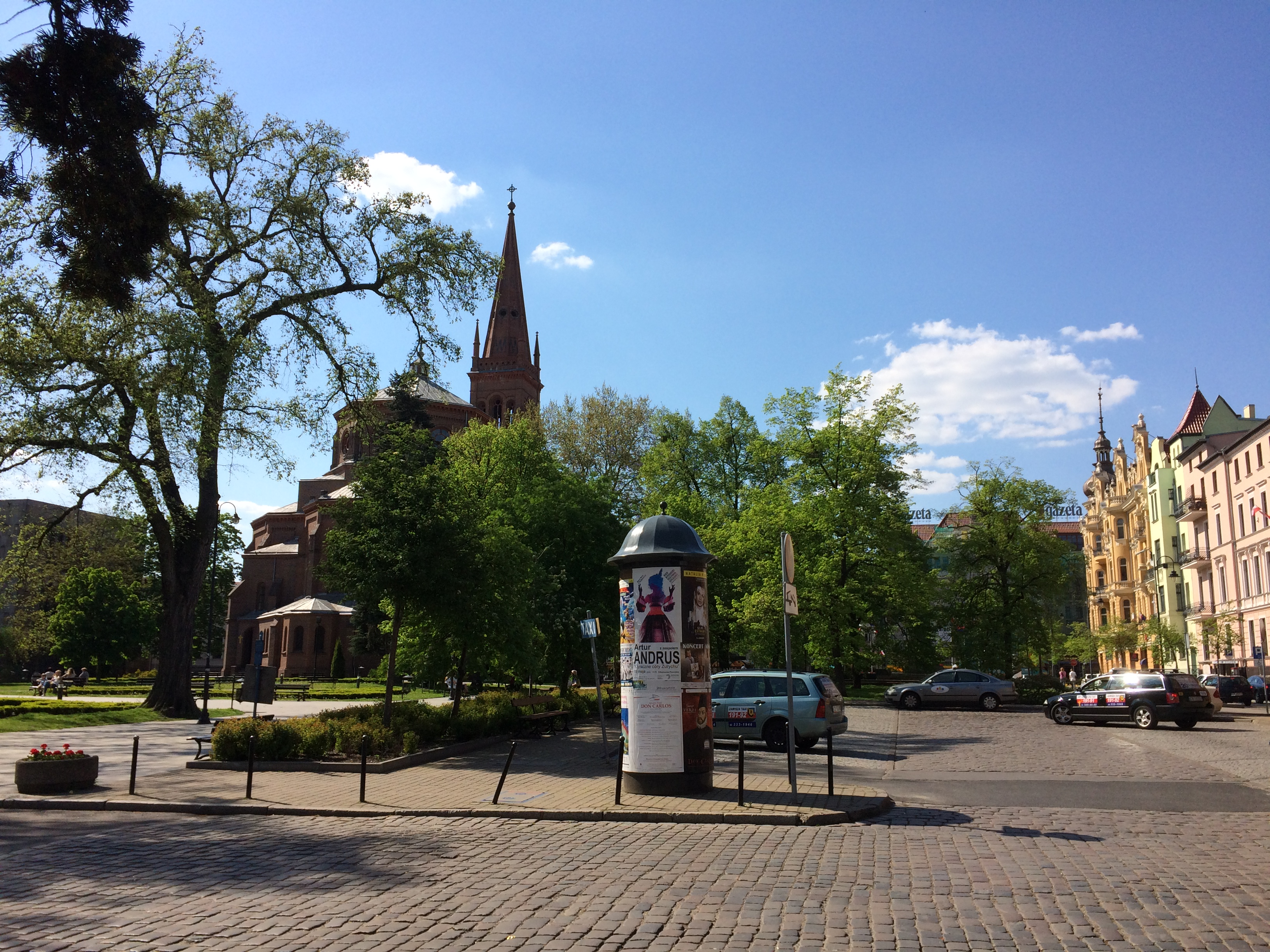
The square from Gimnazjalna street

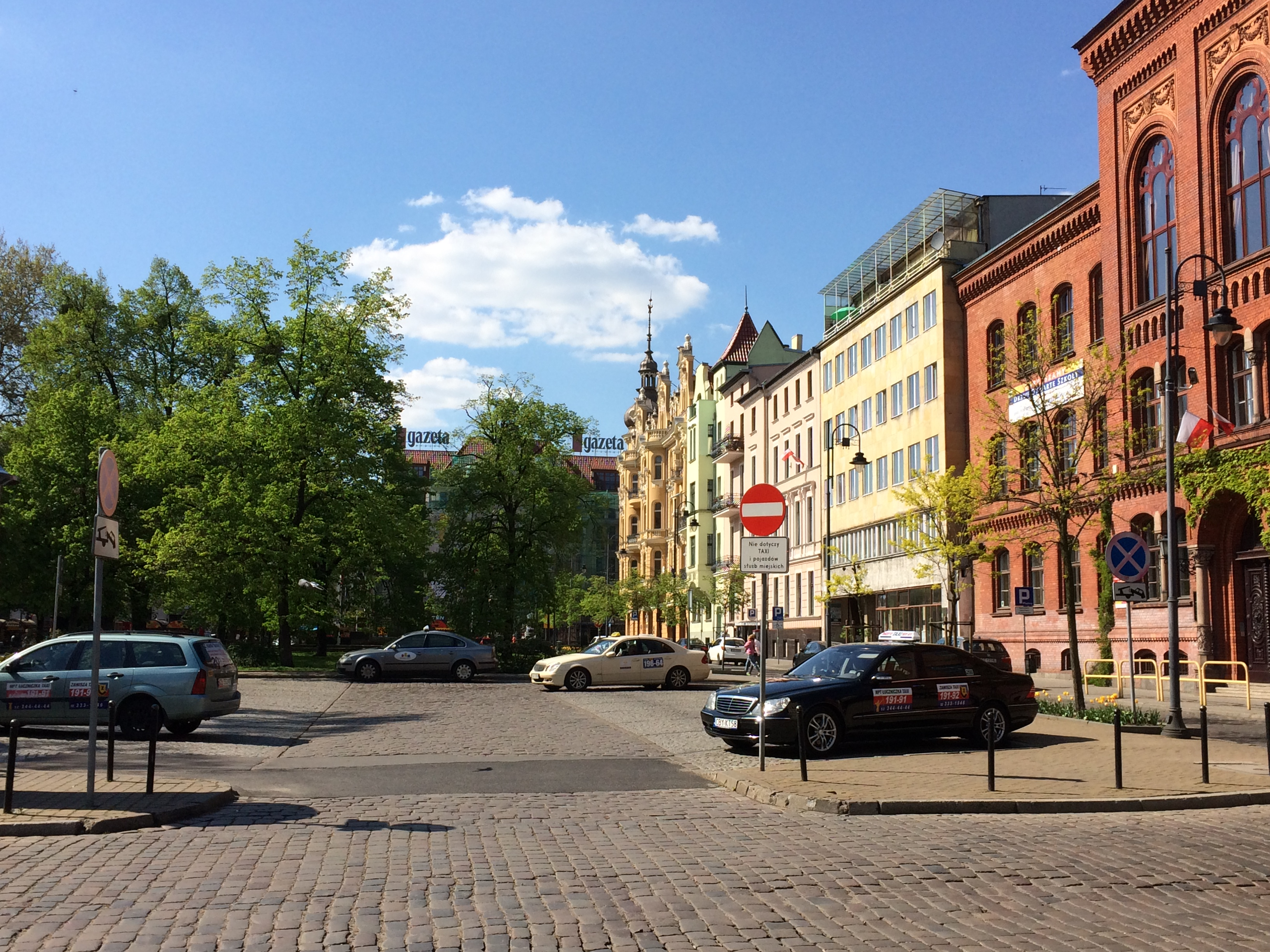
Northern frontage of Plac wolnosci from Gimnazjalna street

=== High School Nr.1 – Polish: I Liceum Ogólnokształcące im. C. K. Norwida ===
Registered on Kuyavian-Pomeranian Voivodeship heritage list, Nr.601432, reg. A/989, May 28, 1991

1876

Neo-Gothic

High School Nr.1 "Cyprian Kamil Norwid" is the oldest secondary school in Bydgoszcz, located on Plac Wolnosci. According to the latest national rankings, it is one of the two best high schools in Bydgoszcz.

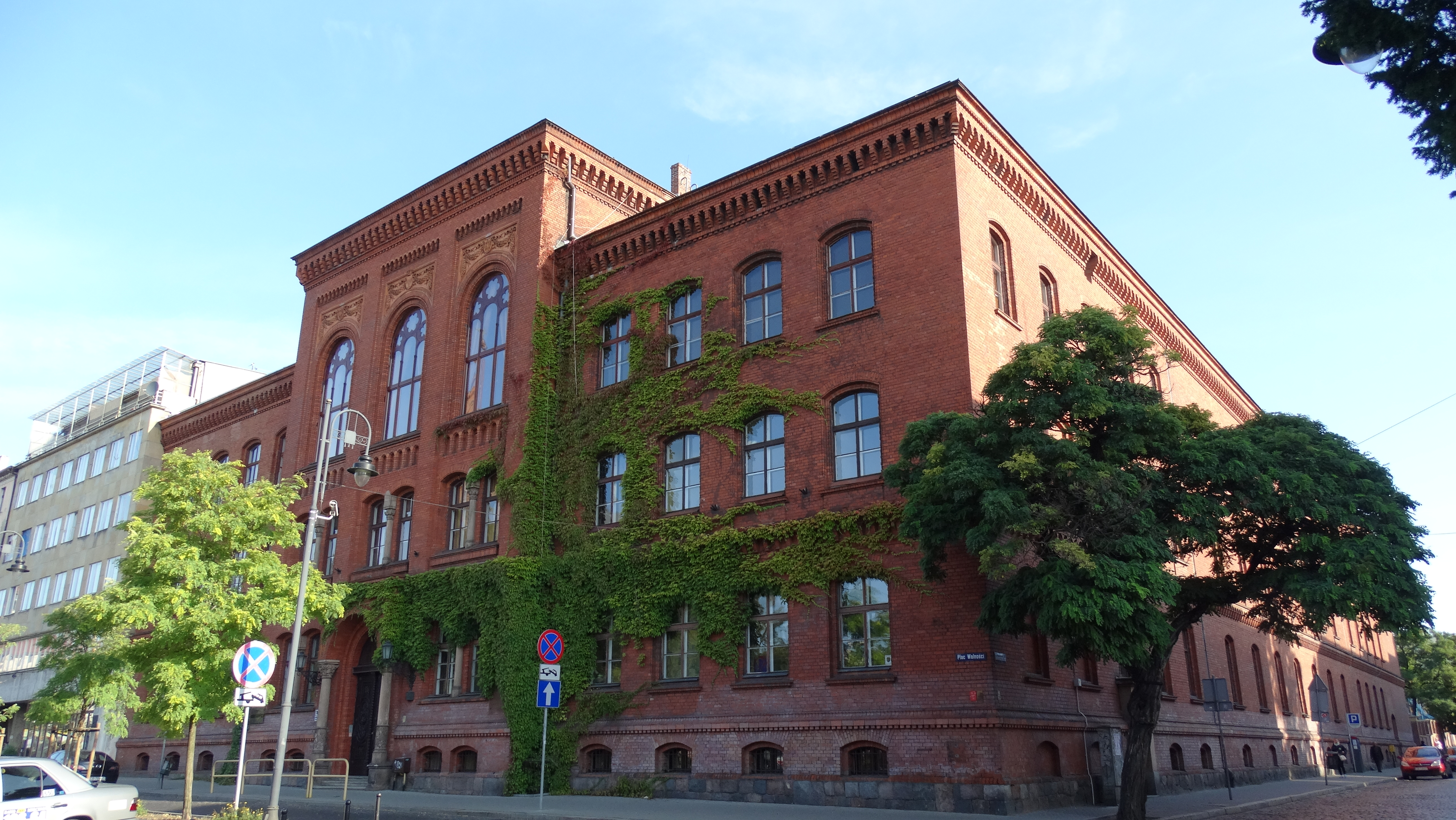
View of the corner with Gimnazjalna street

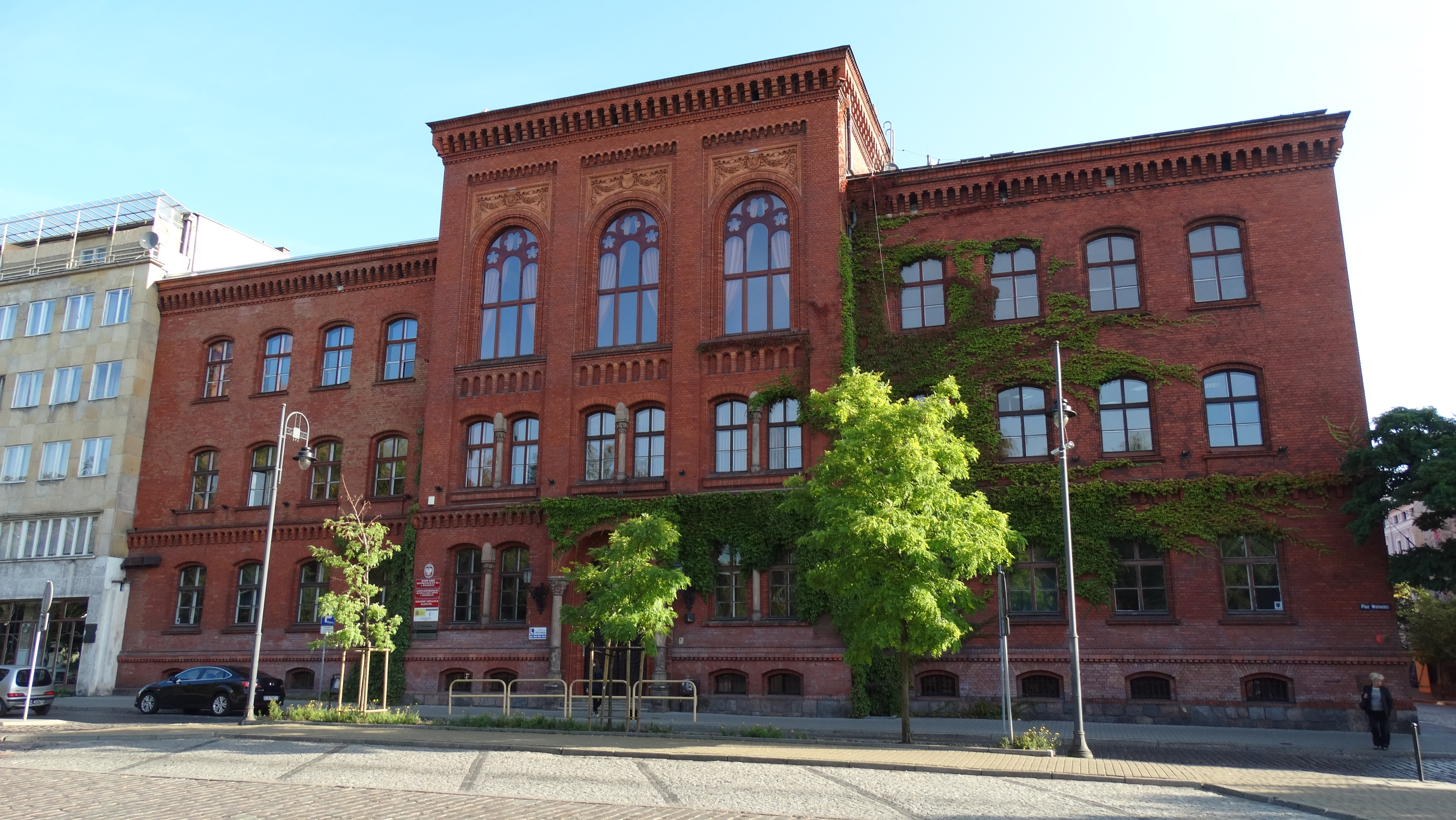
Main elevation on the Square

=== Tenement at 2 ===
1920–1930, by Bronisław Jankowski

Eclecticism

This tenement is a late addition to the house at Nr.2a from the 19th century. Together, the complex was devoted to health service. During World War II, it housed a hospital for women. From 1975 to 1993, it was one of three facilities for lung diseases in the city, together with the Provincial Pulmonary Hospital at 1 Seminaryjna street and the tuberculosis sanatorium in the northern district of Smukała.

Few architectural details still prevail: only an avant-corps in the corner with Plac Wolnosci and a large pediment that crowns the blind facade.

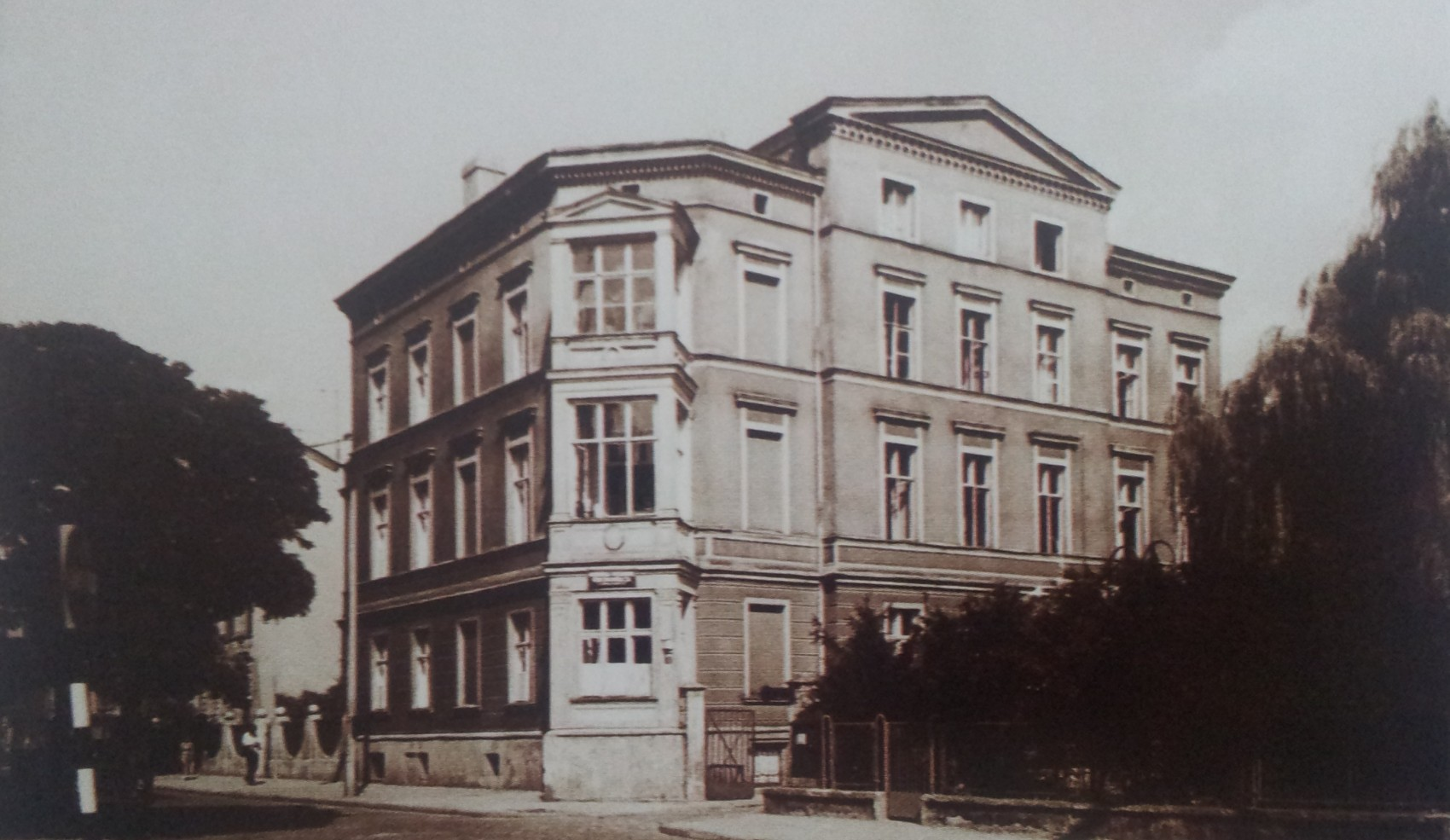
1970: Provincial tuberculosis clinic

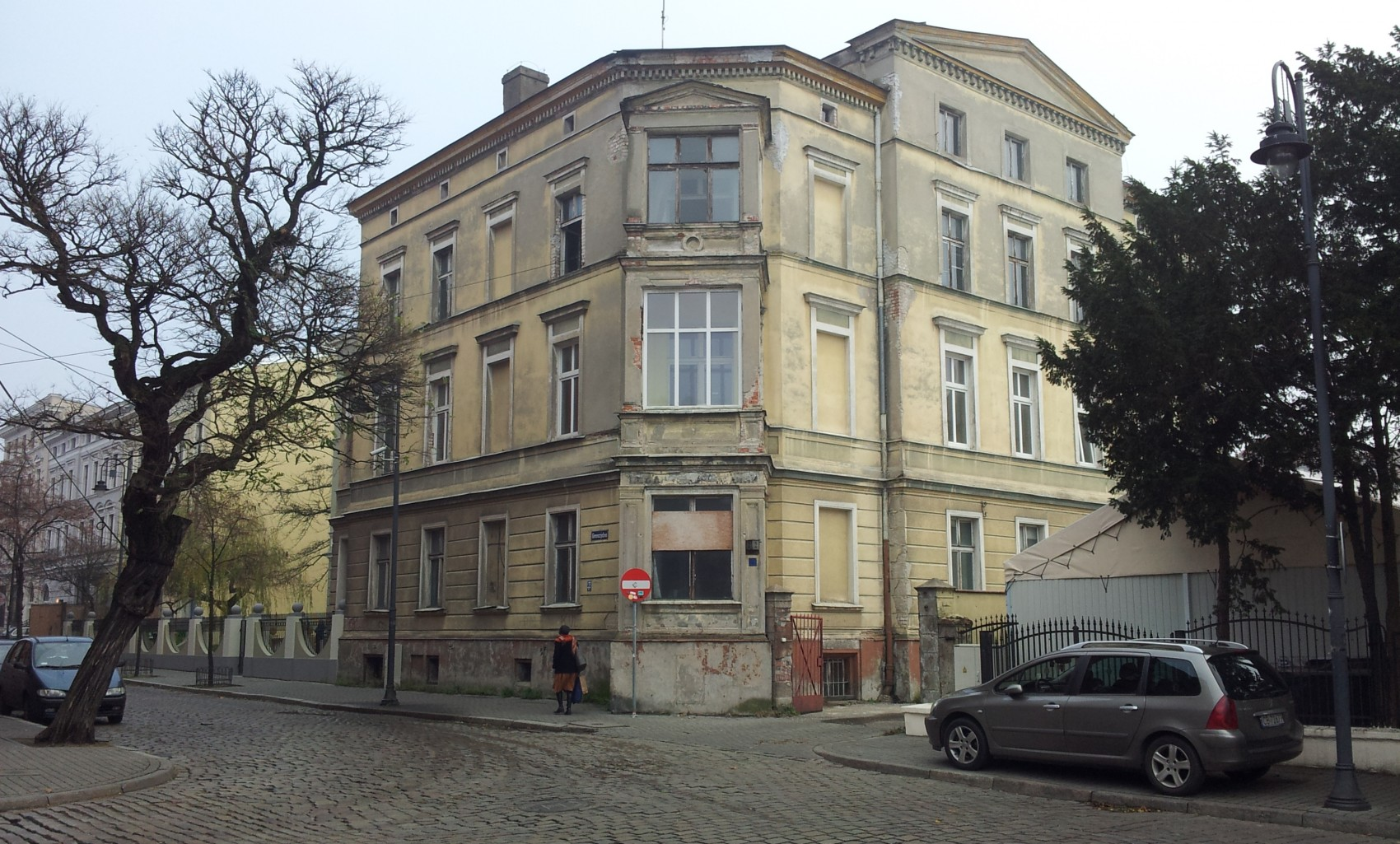
Building in 2015

=== Villa Jan Król, at 2a ===
1865

Neoclassical architecture

Former Weltzin Platz 5, the house was initially constructed for a master mason, as a villa. In 1880, it was the property of Anton Czarnecki, a rentier and merchant owner also in the 1890s of the tenement at Krasiński Street Nr.9. During the interwar, a neighbouring was completed as an addition to Nr.2 for Dr Jan Król, a specialist in nervous diseases. It was used as a hospital for women between 1930 and 1945.

In 1975, the ensemble (2 & 2a) housed the Provincial Clinic of Tuberculosis and Lung Diseases till 1993, when the health institution was transferred to 11 Seminaryjna street. Deeply renovated in 2015, it now houses a business incubator facility supported by the Kuyavian-Pomeranian Voivodeship loan fund. Nearby the villa grows a ginkgo identified as Natural landmark of Bydgoszcz.

The villa displays beautiful neo-classical features: symmetry in the facade, ionic order columns flanking balconies, a curly motifs frieze on the top, a large pediment capping the ensemble. Above the entry portal has been restored the original caduceus which recalls the initial medical focus if the villa. On the green part left of the building, one can enjoy the refurbished fountain with a lion's head and a shell-shape stone bowl.

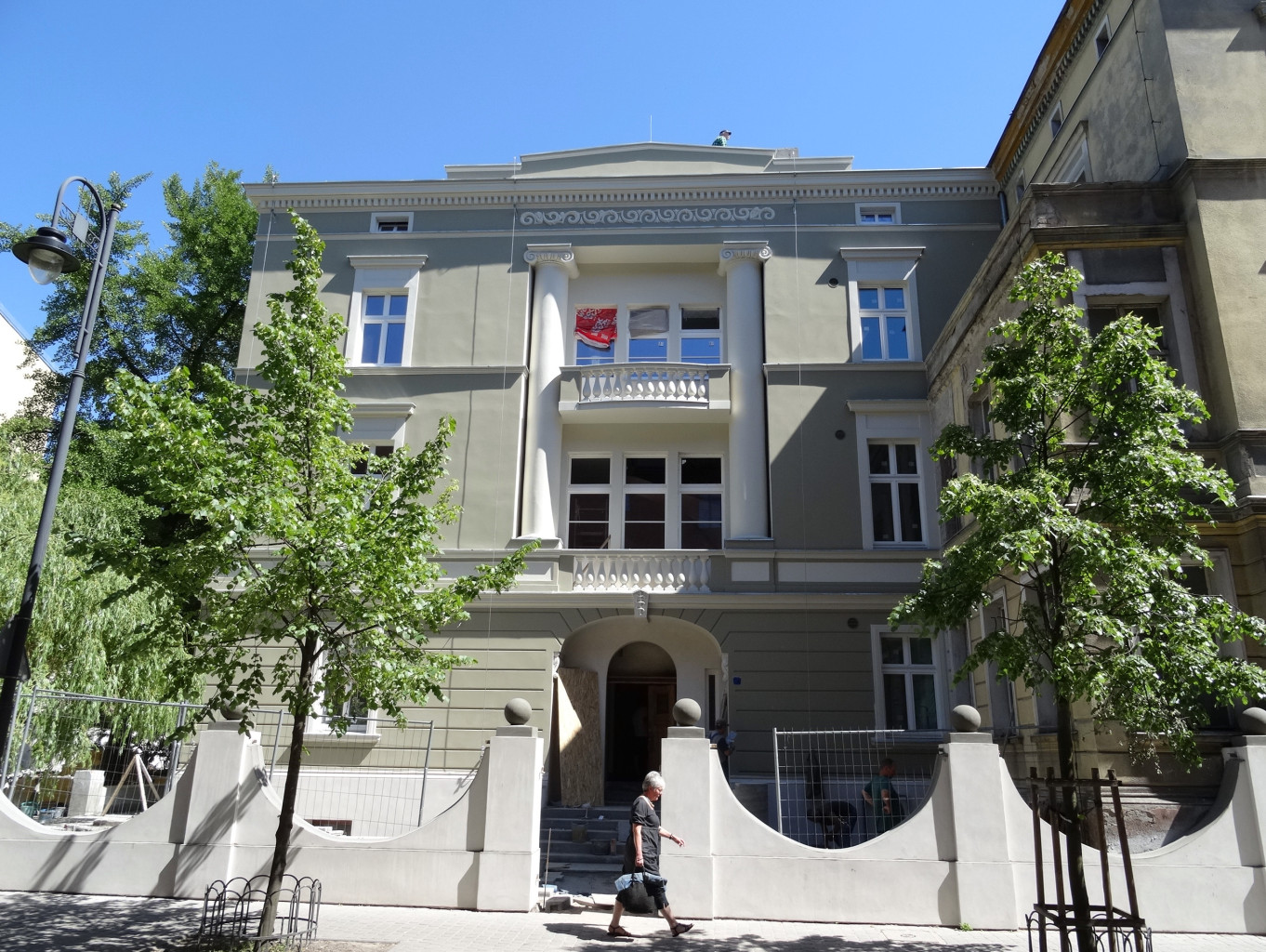
View of the villa facade

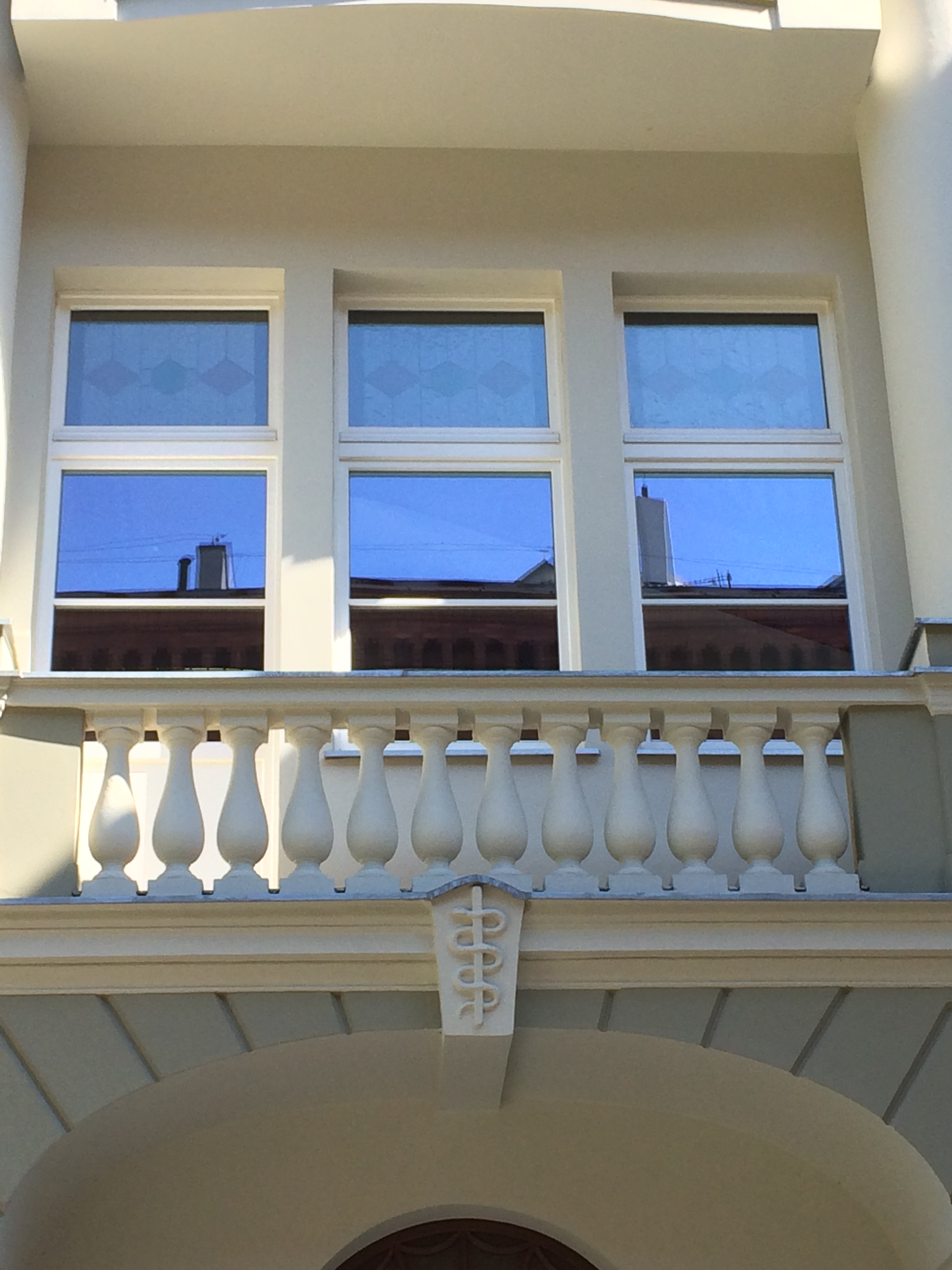
Detail of the elevation balcony

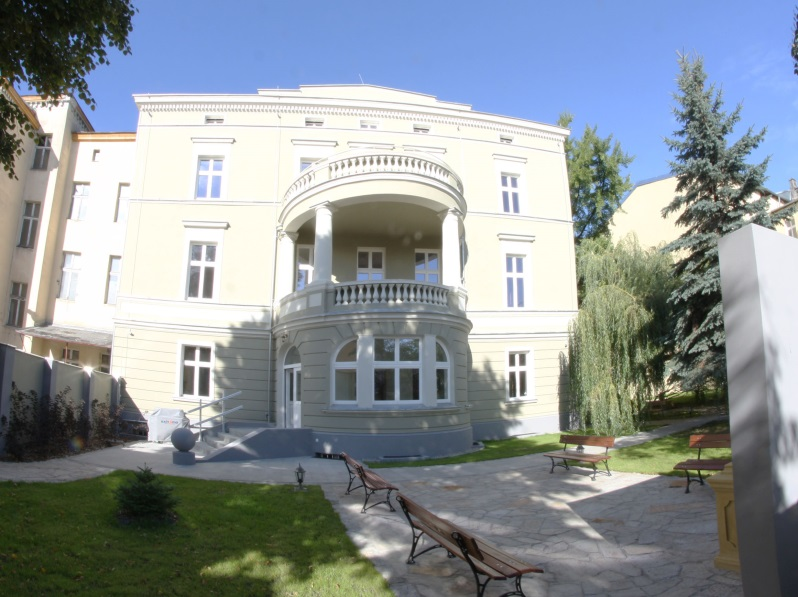
Facade on the garden

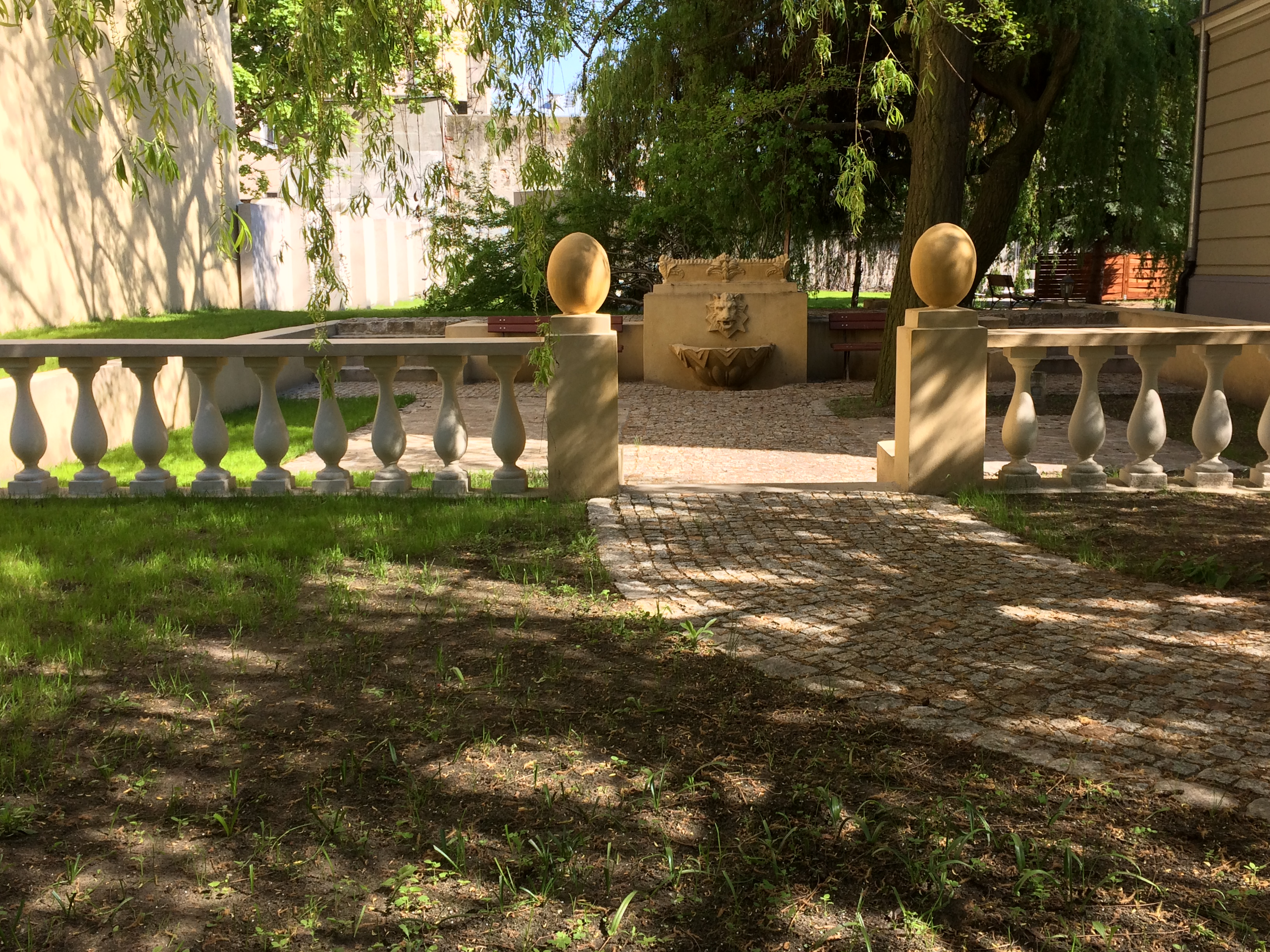
View of the lion fountain

=== Tenement at 4 ===
1880

Eclecticism

Former Gymnasialstraße 1, the first owner was Anton Czarnecki, a rentier and merchant who lived there until he moved in the 1890s in his new acquisition at 9 Krasiński Street. It then was used as a residential tenement: in the 1910, the landlord of Nos.4, 6 and 8 (not living in) was the Baron von Lüttichau, chamberlain to the Princess Elisabeth of Prussia. After 1920, houses at Nos.4, 6 and 8 have been owned by the same person, Mr Kierski

The main elevation, renovated in 2016, shows some classical details, with each floor having its own features (pediments, cartouches), a slight avant-corps, and a delicate frieze with winged animals as motifs.

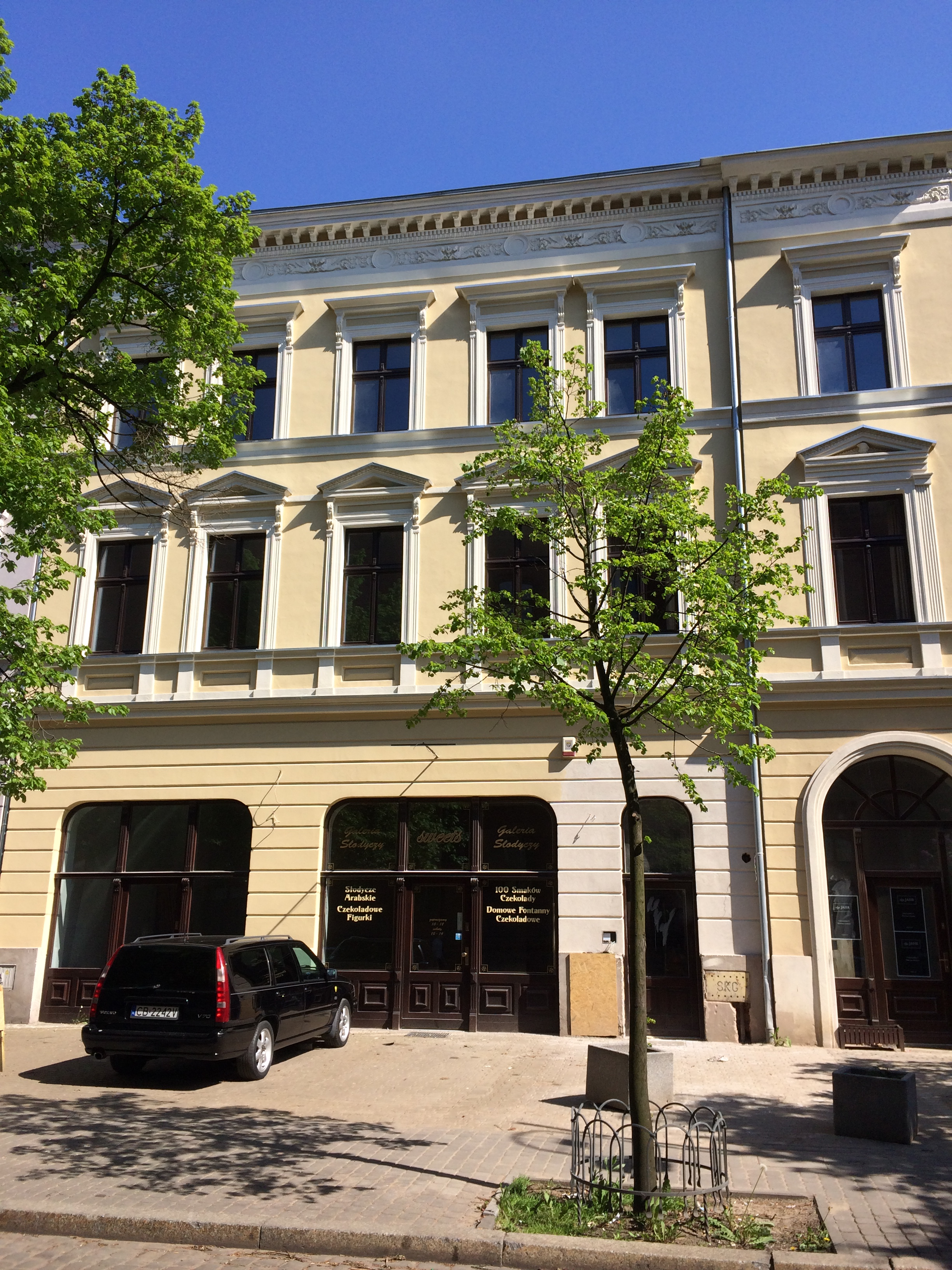
Main elevation on the street

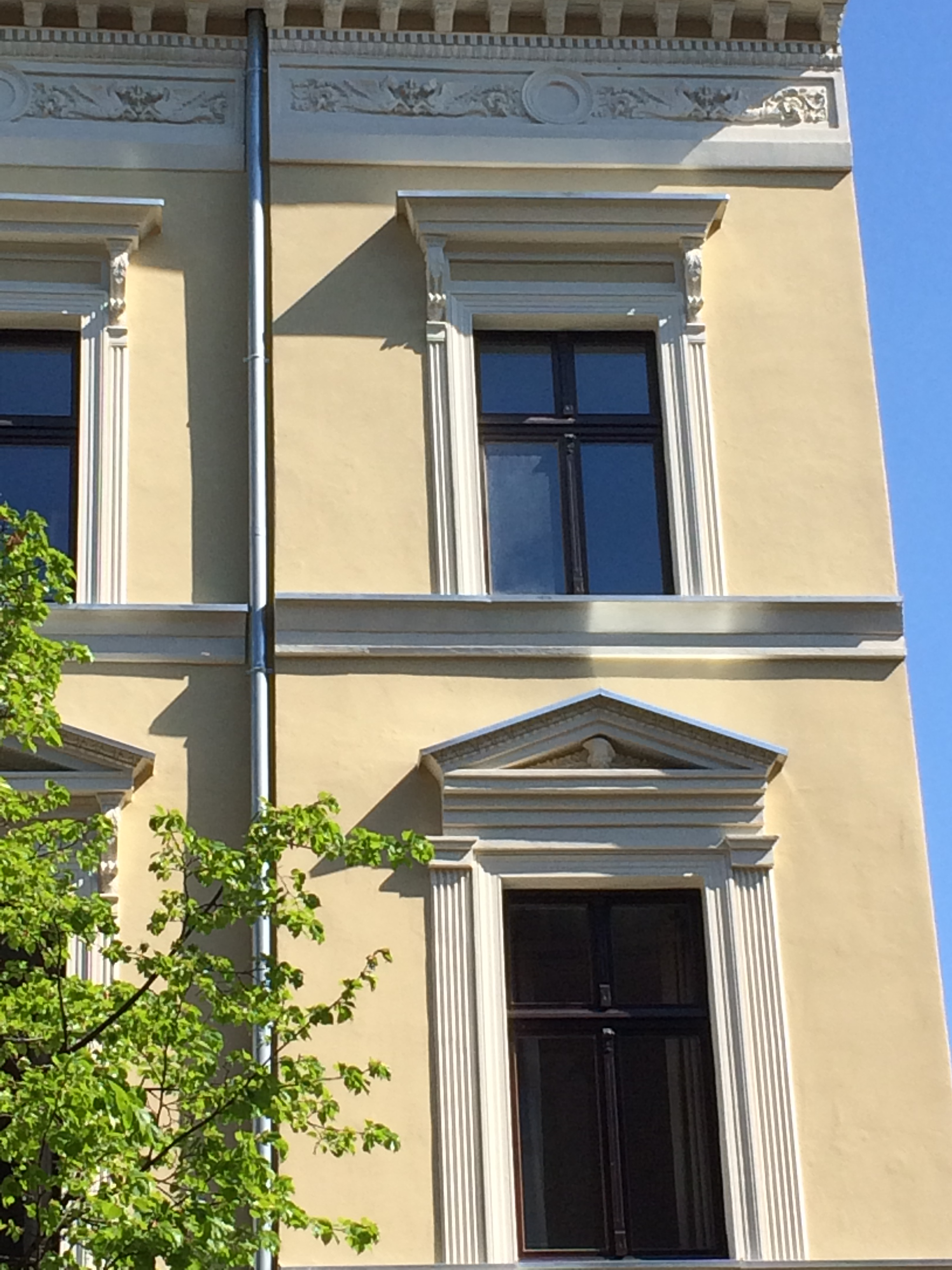
Window decoration detail

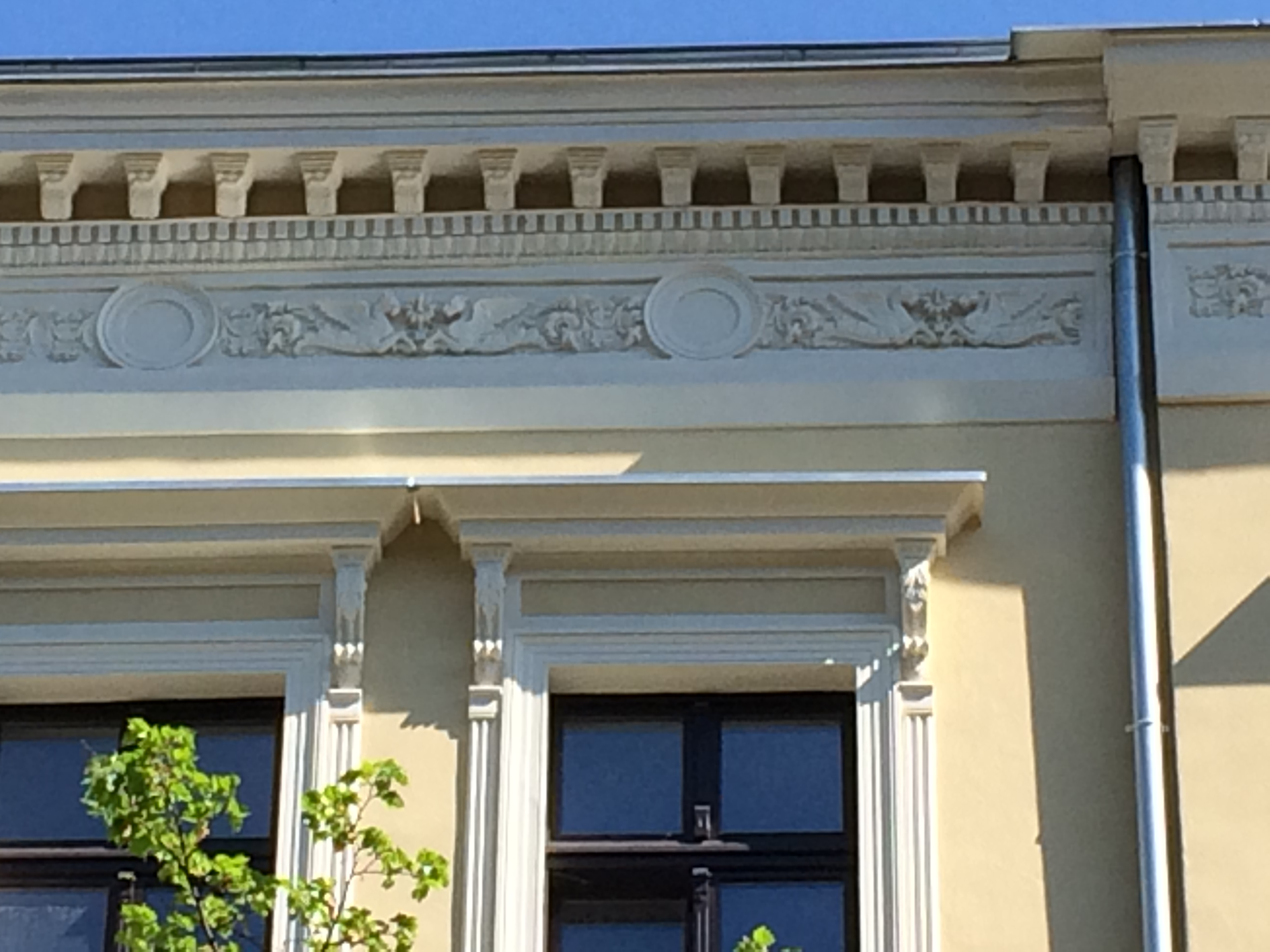
Top frieze

=== Tenement at 6 ===
1880

Eclecticism

Former Gymnasialstraße 2, the first owner was Anton Czarnecki, a rentier and merchant who possessed also the tenement at Nos.4 and 8. It then was used as a residential tenement: in the 1890s, half of the tenants were teachers at the "gymnasium" across the street. In 1910, the landlord of Nos.4, 6 and 8 (not living in) was the Baron von Lüttichau, chamberlain to the Princess Elisabeth of Prussia. After 1920, houses at Nos.4, 6 and 8 have been owned by the same person, Mr Kierski.

The main elevation, renovated in 2015, echoes its neighbours at Nos.4 and 8 with its classical details.

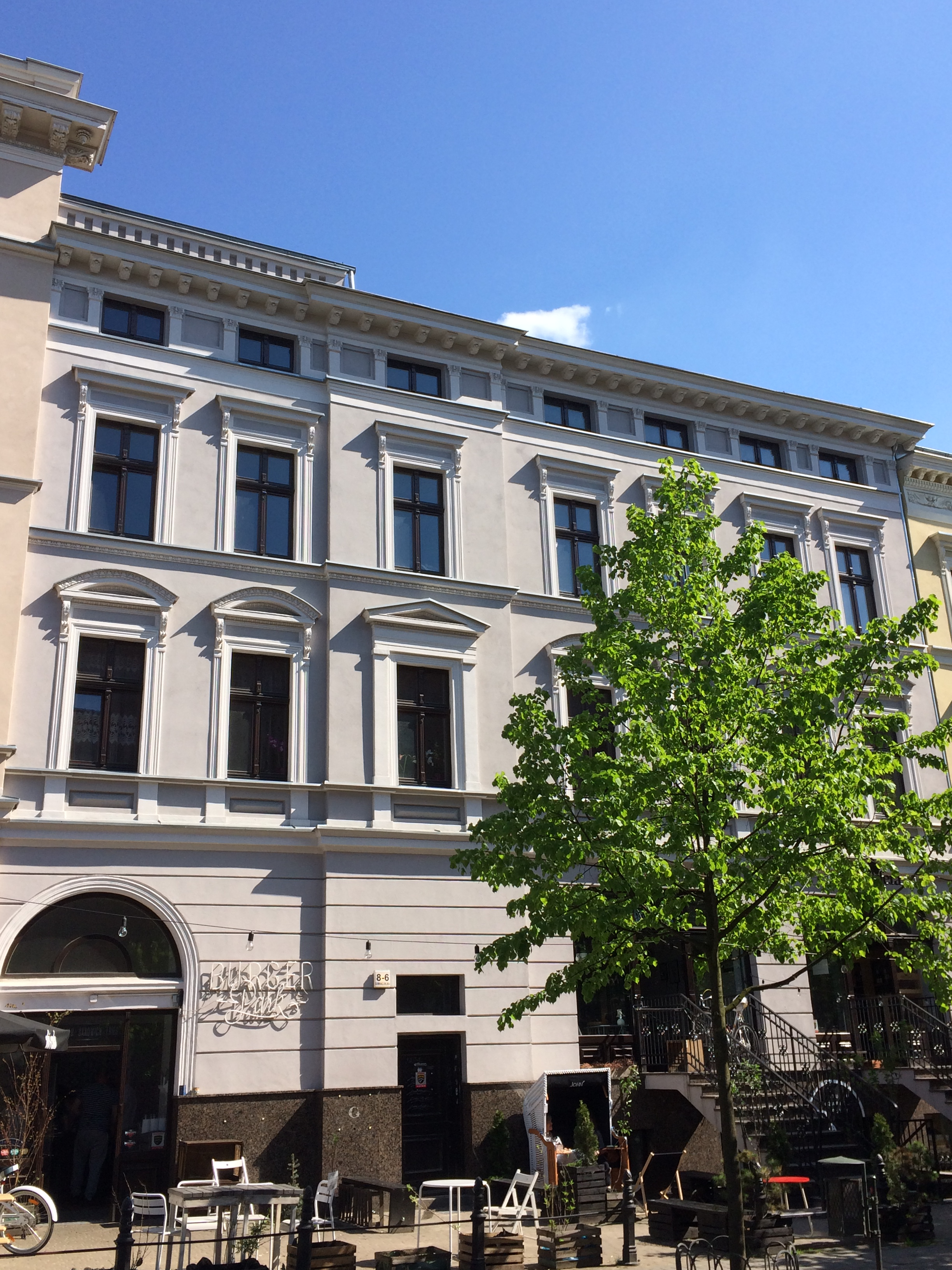
Main elevation on the street

=== Tenement at 8 ===
1885

Eclecticism

Former Gymnasialstraße 3, the first owner was Anton Czarnecki, a rentier and merchant who possessed also the tenement at Nos.4 and 6. It then was used as a residential tenement: in the 1890s, half of the tenants were teachers at the "gymnasium" across the street. In 1910, the landlord of Nos.4, 6 and 8 (not living in) was the Baron von Lüttichau, chamberlain to the Princess Elisabeth of Prussia. After 1920, houses at Nos.4, 6 and 8 have been owned by the same person, Mr KierskiAfter 1920, houses at Nos.4, 6 and 8 have been owned by the same person, Mr Kierski.

The main elevation, renovated in 2015, echoes its neighbours at Nos.4 and 6 with its classical details.

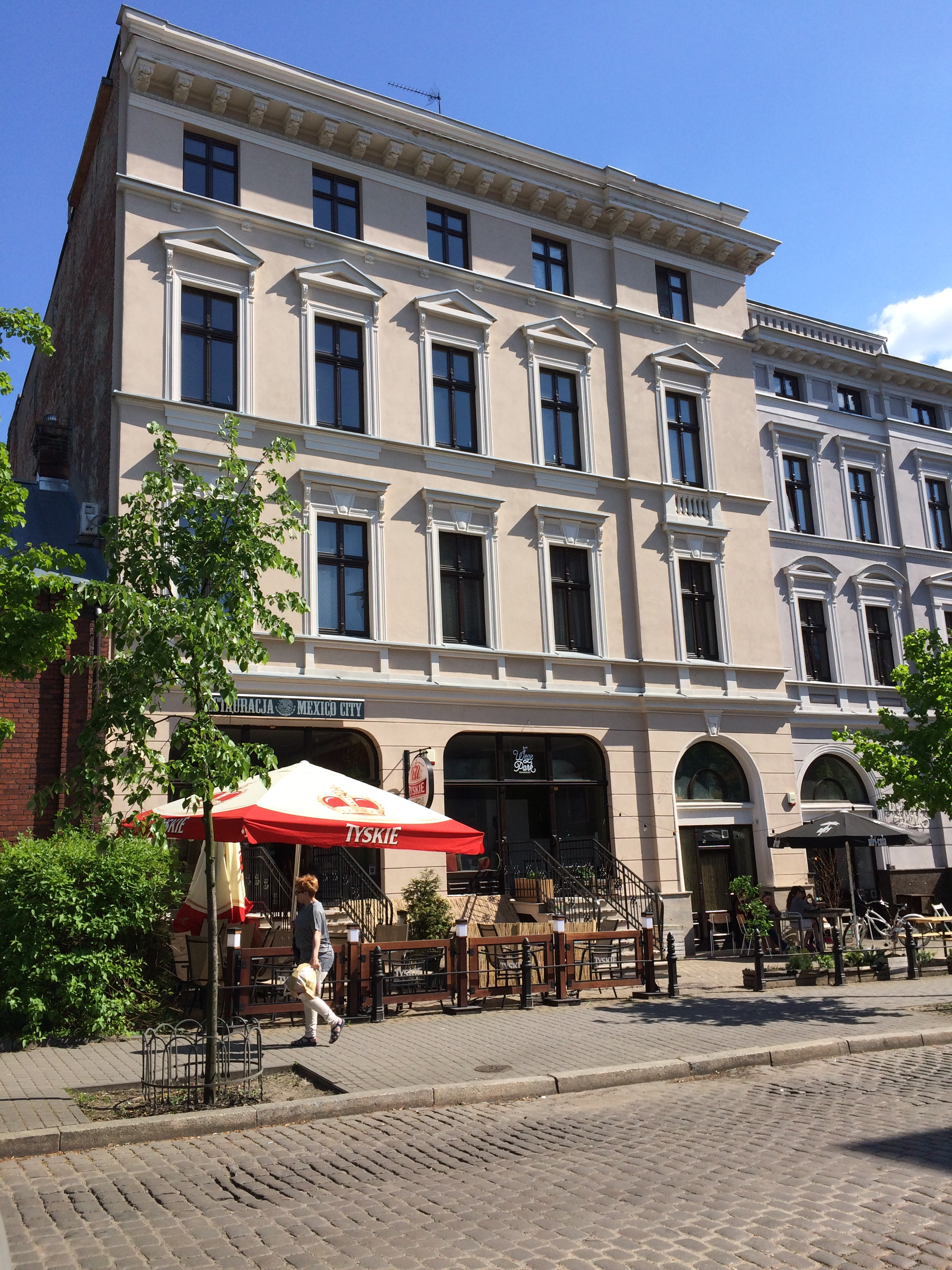
Main elevation on the street

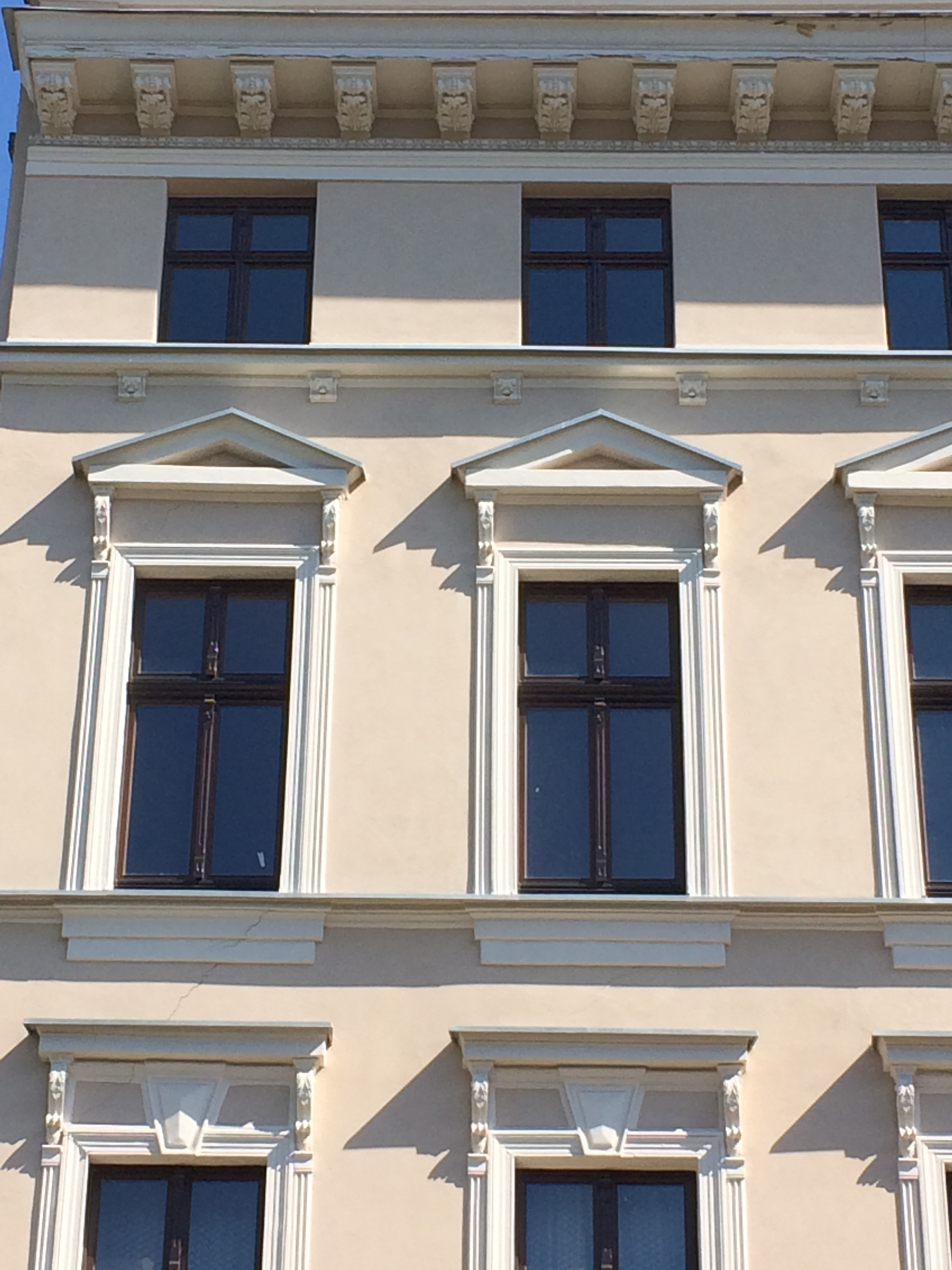
Facade detail

=== Building at the intersection with Krasiński Street ===
1899

Former Gymnasialstraße 4, it is since its construction the sport building of specialized educational centre for blind children located at 10 Krasiński Street.

The building had its interiors refurbished end of 2015.

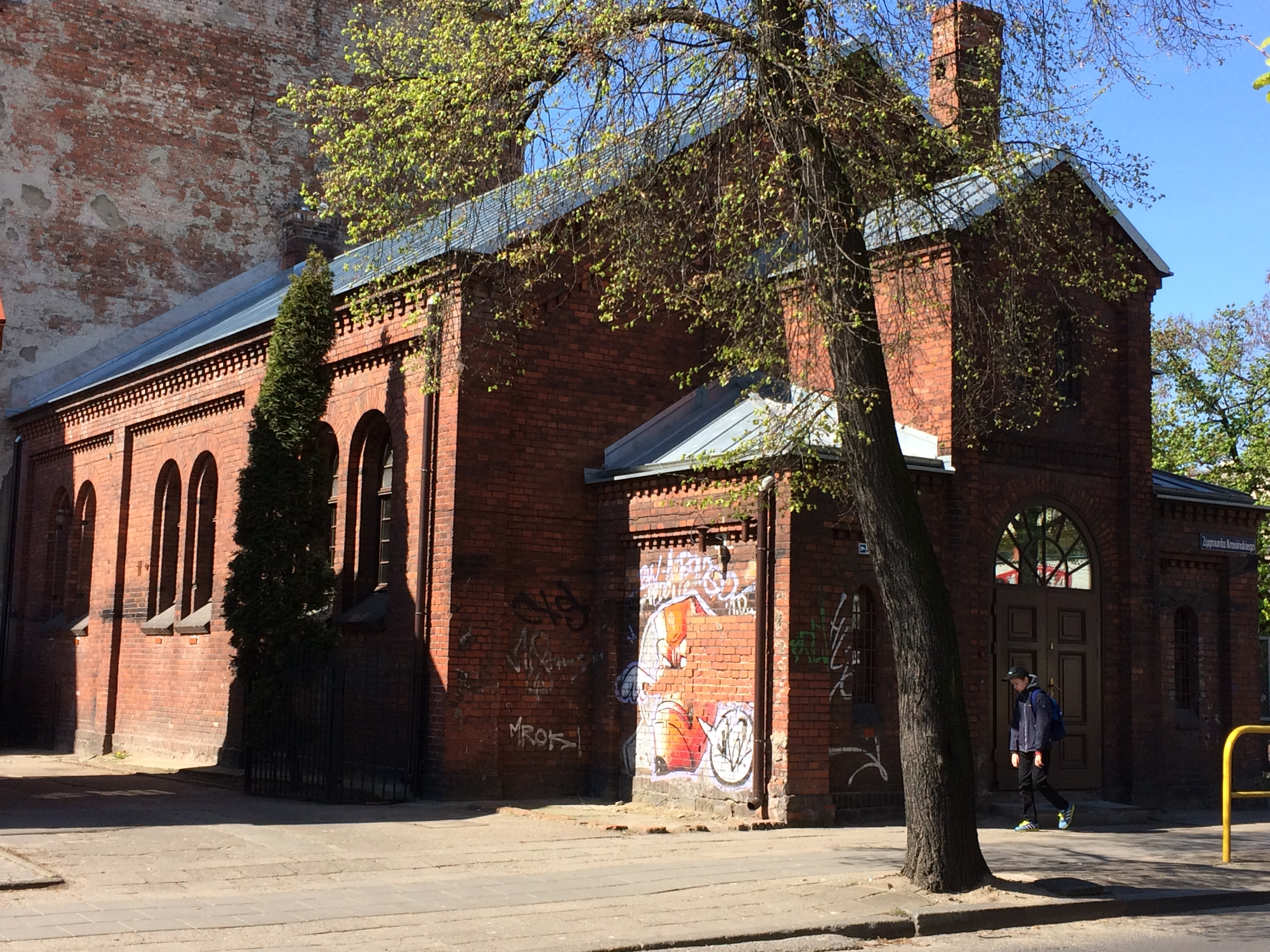
Building from Krasińskiego Street

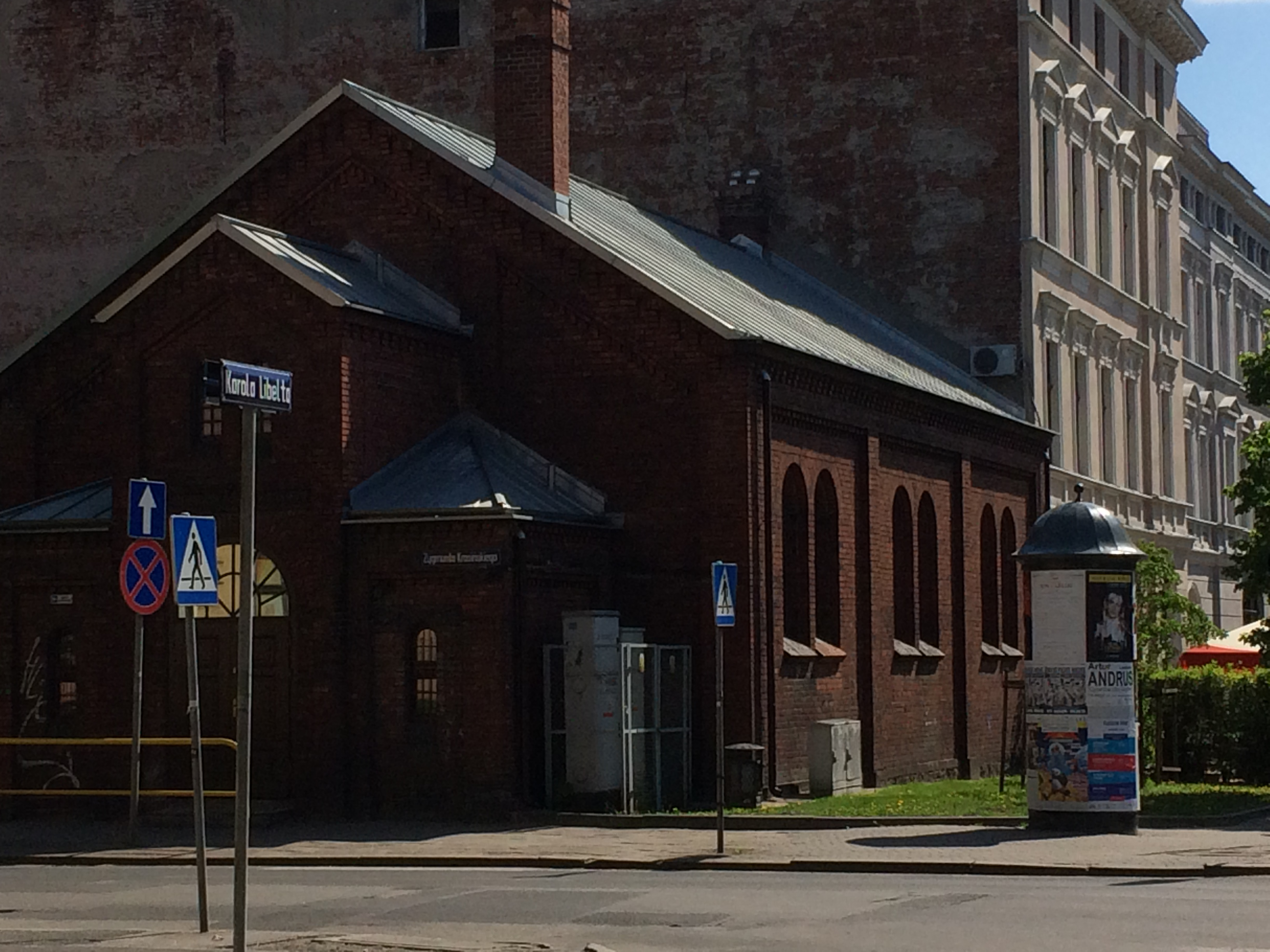
View from Libelta Street

=== Libelta Street ===
Tenement at 2, corner with Krasiński street

1896, by Karl Bergner

Eclecticism, Historicism

The first landlord at then Fröhnerstraße 10 was Anton Czarnecki, a rentier and merchant, who moved there in 1898 and stayed till the early 1920s.

The designer of this tenement, Karl Bergner, realized many other buildings in the city, such as:

- Śniadecki Street Nos.6,10,12,20;
- Foch Street Nos.2,4;
- Cieszkowski Street Nos.7,9,14,16–20,24.

The present one displays eclectic architectural details, a ground floor underlined by the arched entry gate flanked by pilasters, topped by a mask, the ensemble being overlooked by a bay window with bossages. The first floor is the most decorated, mainly with the effort put in the window framings. Each of them is ornamented with accuracy by pilasters, columns, balustrade on the bottom and pediments on the top. The variety of shapes, forms and motifs could even be labelled as Neo-Baroque influence. The upper level is crowned by a corbel table shaped in animal figures.

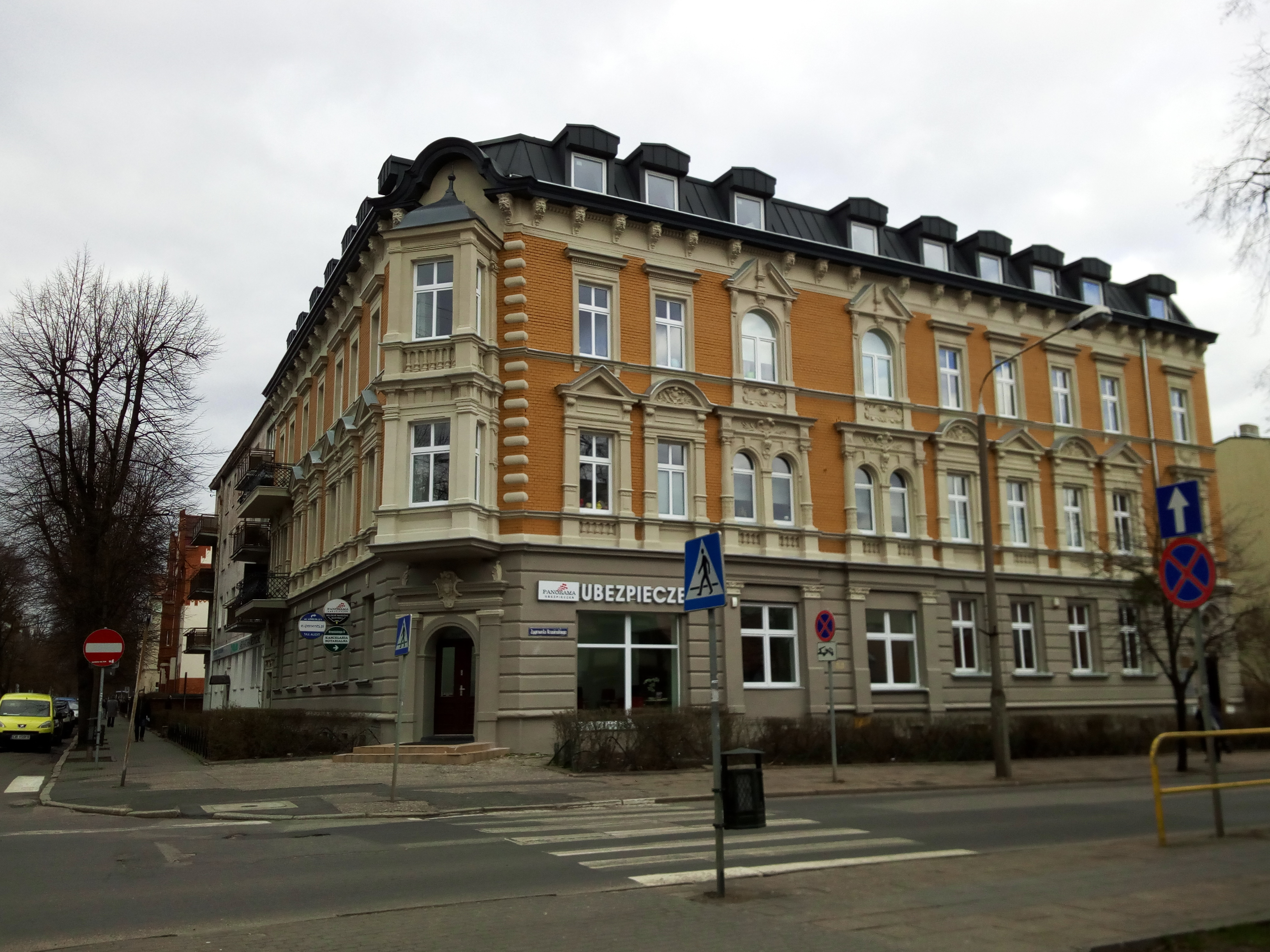
View from Krasiński Street

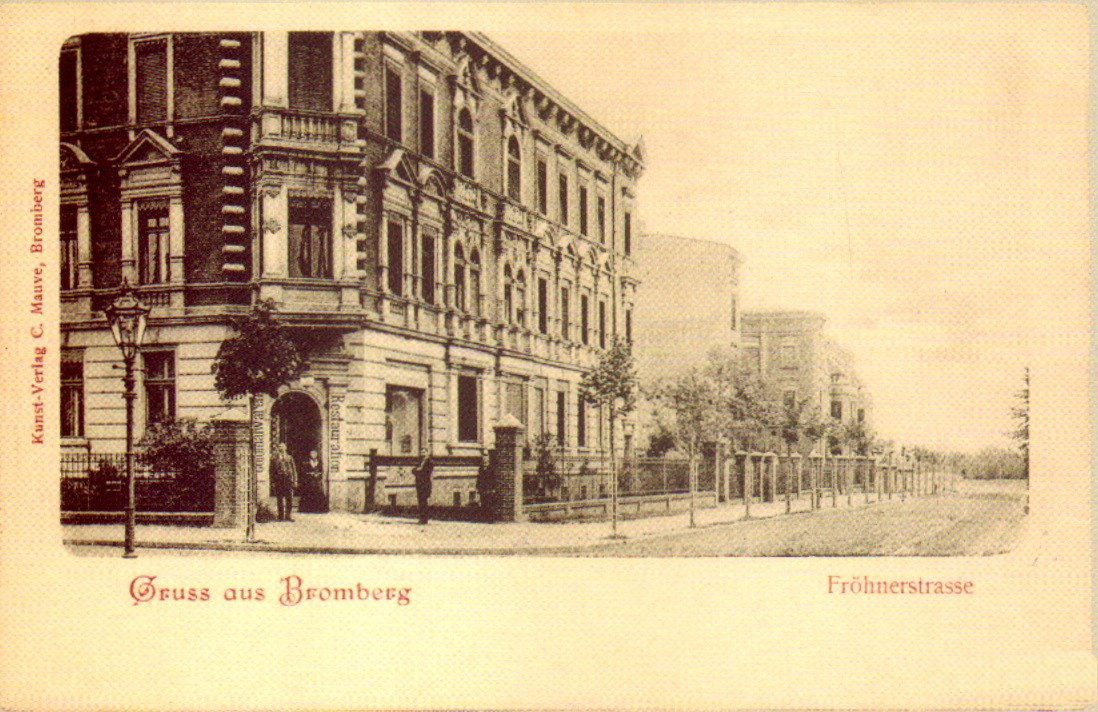
The tenement on a 1908 postcard

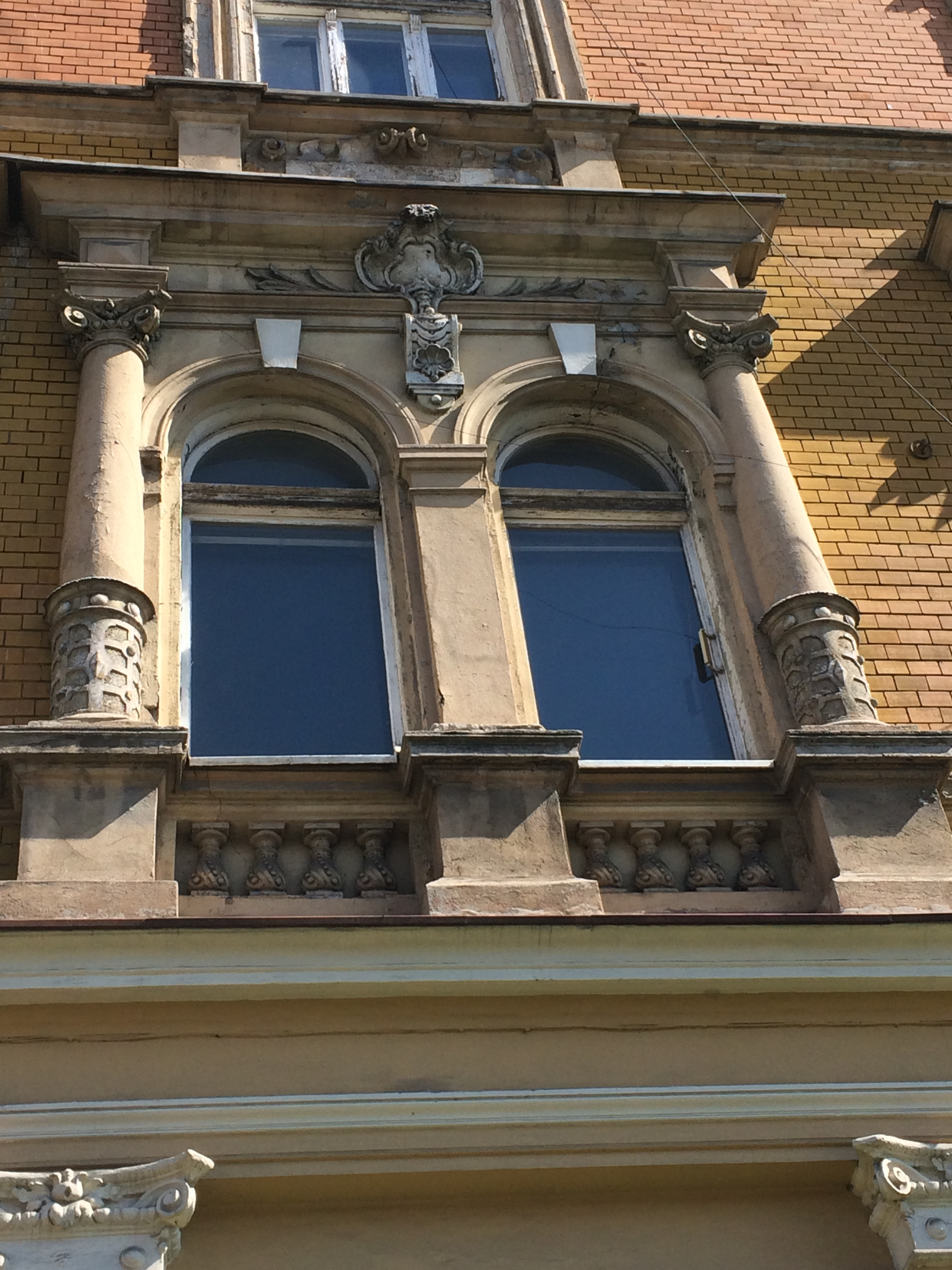
Detail of a window ornamentation

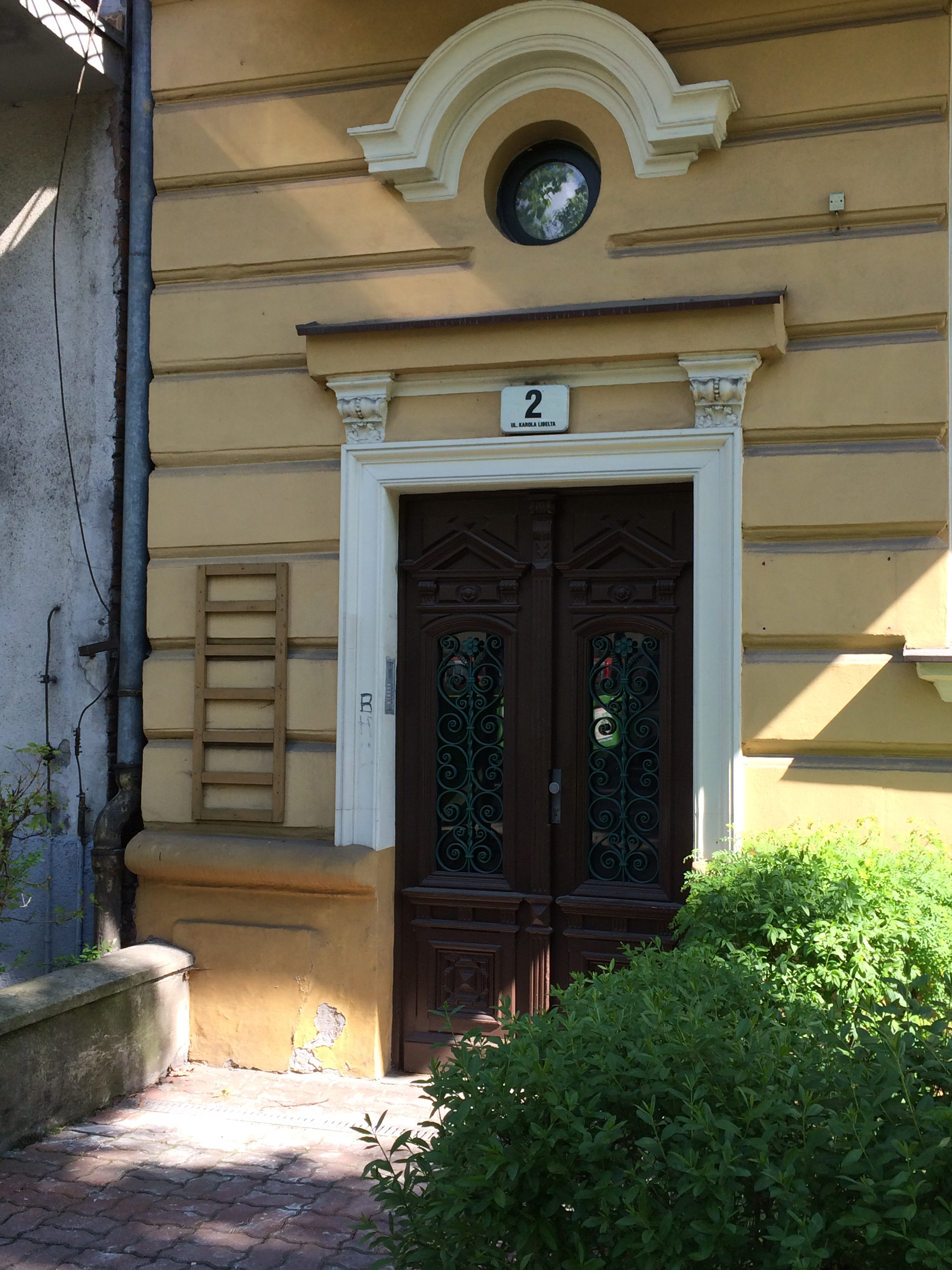
Entry gate at 2 Libelta

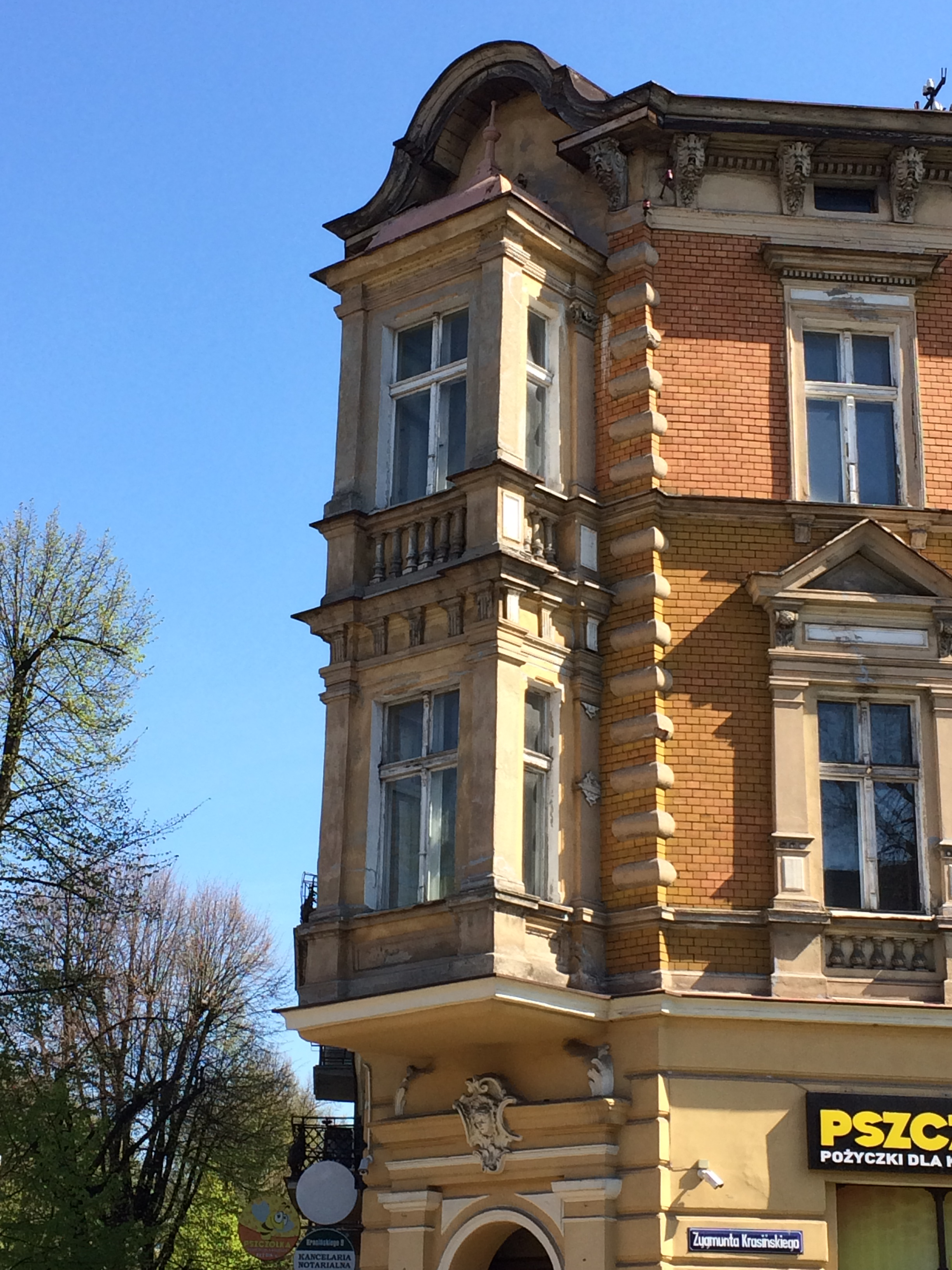
Bay window

=== Tenement at 4 ===
1897-1898

Neoclassical architecture

First mention of this house dates back to 1905, as a property of the Evangelist Community in Bromberg. There were located the parish home and offices of the local Evangelical Polish parish established in 1920. In 1932, at the location was the local temple of Polish evangelicals. Since 2013, it is leased to a social association "Kreatywni" to run a youth hostel, Pałacyk.

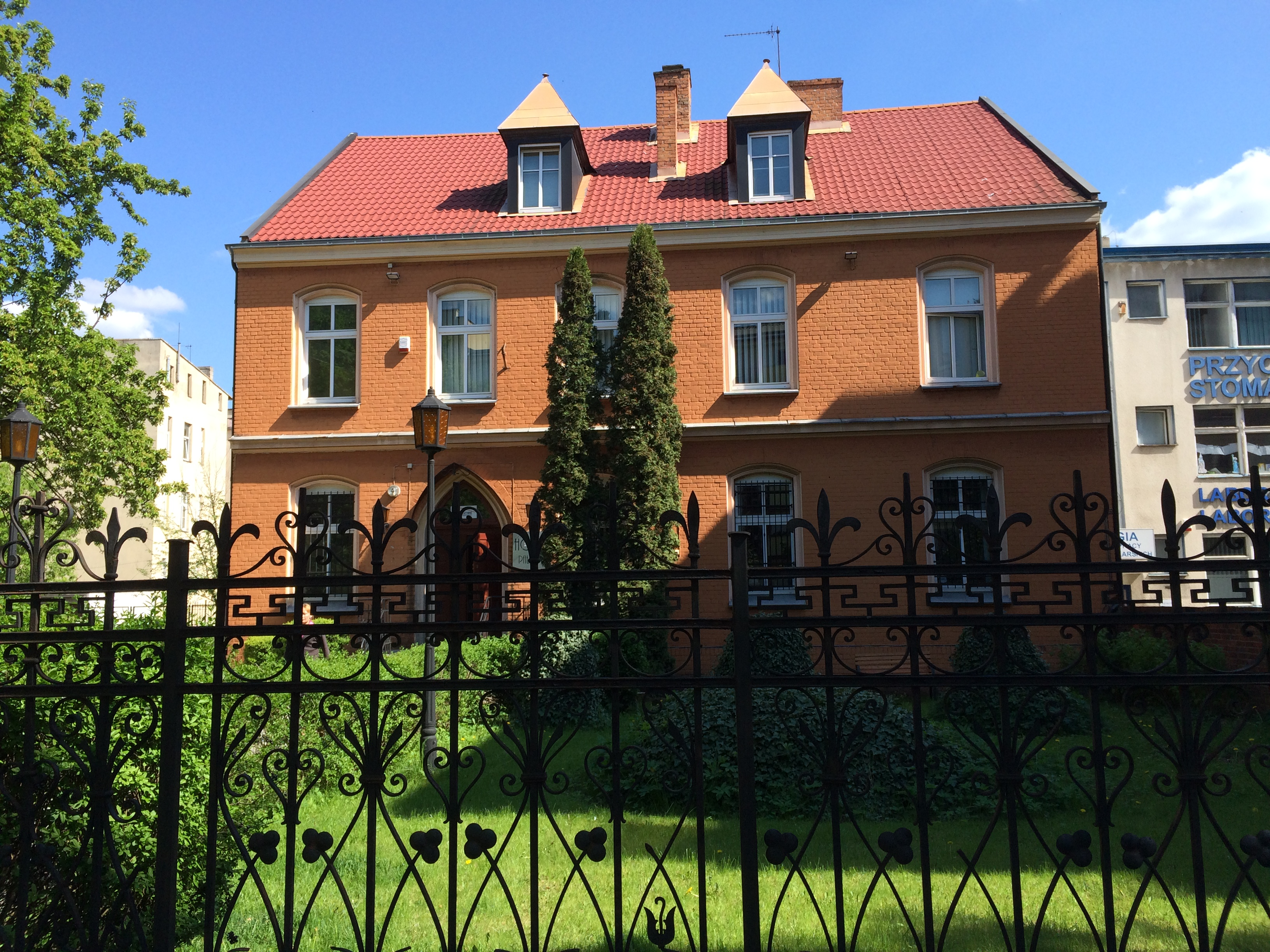
Front view

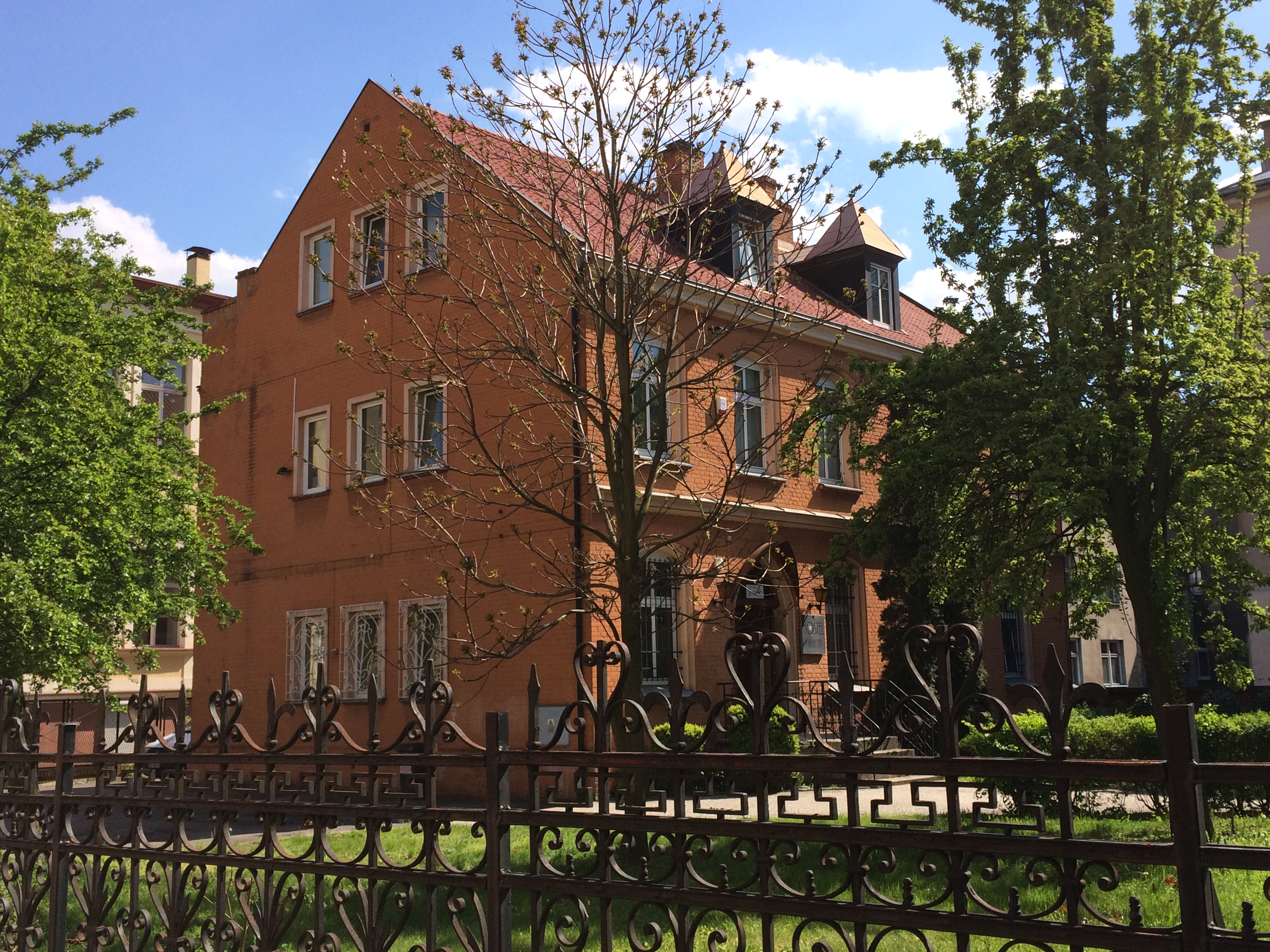
Back view

=== Tenement at 5 ===
1928–1929, by Bogdan Raczkowski

Modern Architecture

In the building lived Adam Grzymała-Siedlecki (1876–1967), a Polish literary and theater critic, playwright, translator, writer and director. A long time friend with Witold Bełzą, then director of the Provincial and Municipal Public Library, he died in Bydgoszcz in his flat at Nr.5. As required in his will, his legacy -manuscripts, private library, more than 300 works- were moved to Bydgoszcz Municipal Library. The institution still tends his last place at Nr.5, as a small museum in his memory. On the frontage has been unveiled in 1988 a commemorative plaque.

The building boasts early modernist style, as one can find also at 51, 57 or 107 Jagiellońska street.

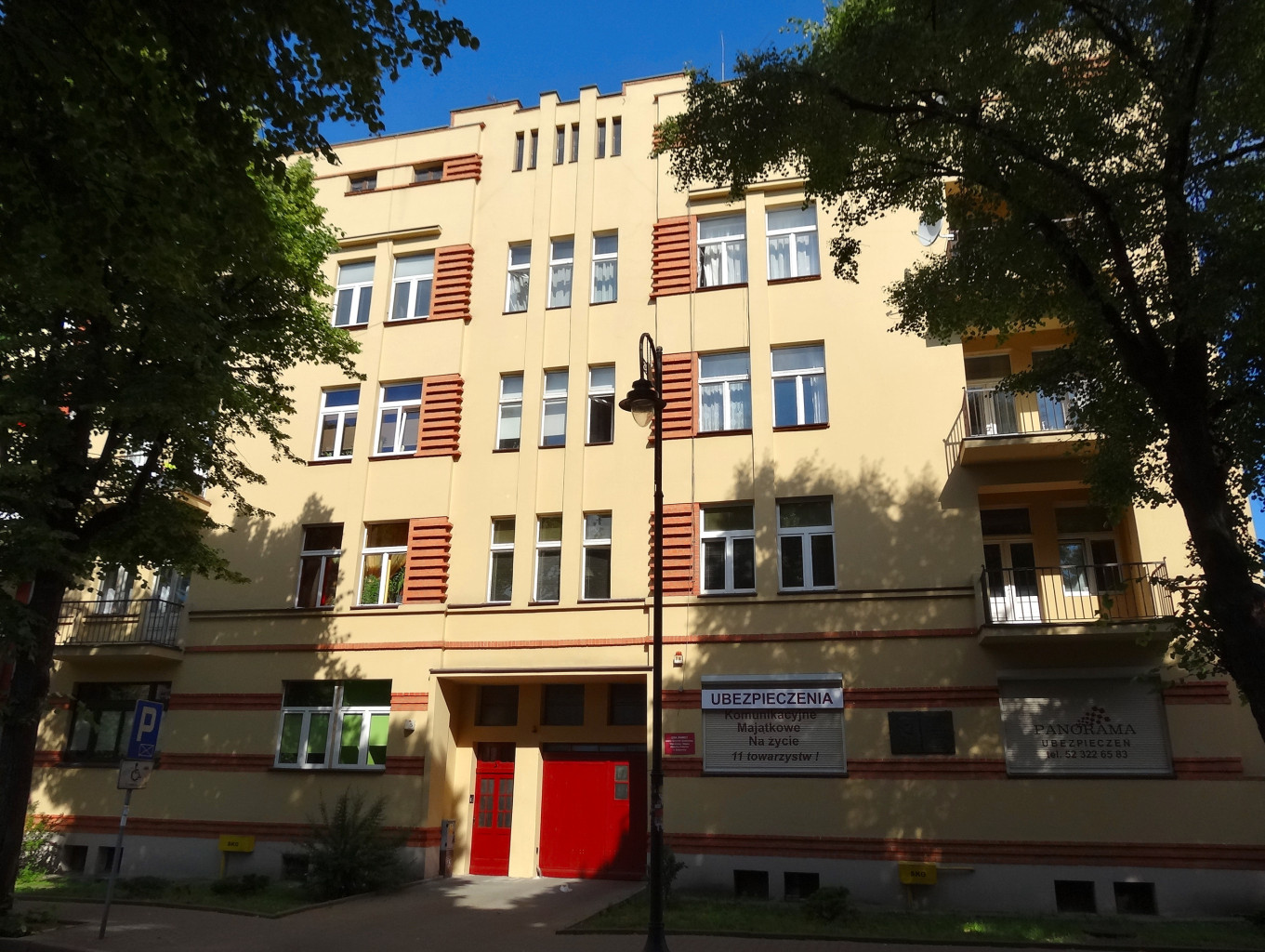
Current front view

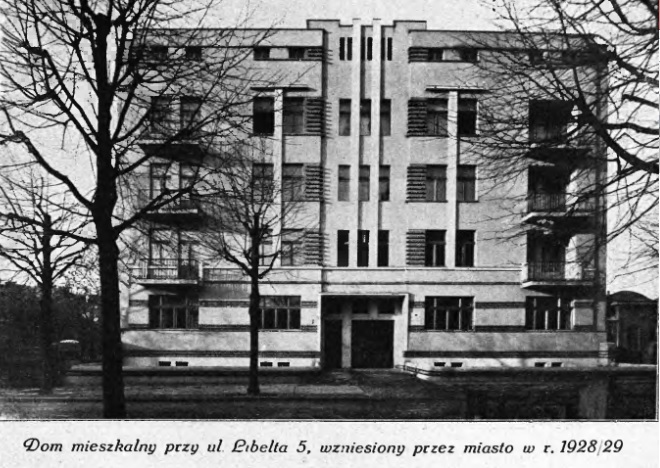
The tenement in 1929

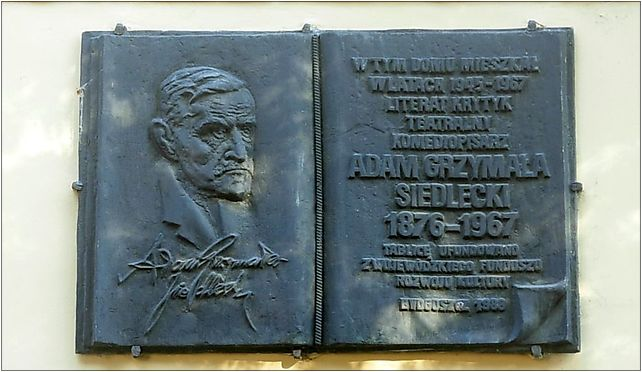
In memoriam plaque

=== Villa at 8 ===
1898

Historicism (art) & early Art Nouveau

Initially located at Roonstraße 5/6, the building dates back from the first time of Roonstraße, today's Kołłątaja street. At the time, access to the villa was only possible through this street. At its construction, the villa was the seat of Bydgoszcz's lodge of the Independent Order of Odd Fellows, and local lodge of the B'nai B'rith. The house was stormed on November 26, 1938, by local police and closed, as a consequence of the nazi enabling Act of 1933. The building has been auctioned in June 2015.

The edifice displays early signs of Art Nouveau style, allowing the villa to appear less massive. The asymmetry of the ensemble contributes to this feeling: the entry gate is oriented on the side, topped by a facet bay window and flanked on the opposite side by an avant-corps.

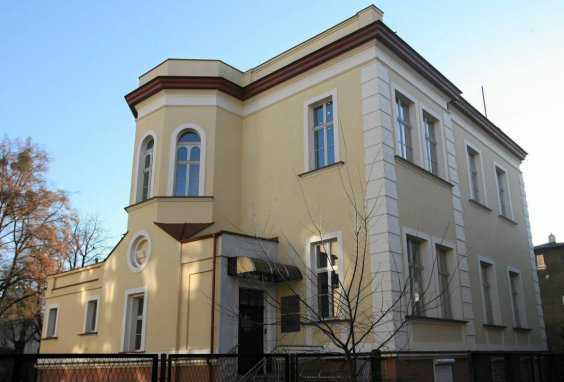
Side view

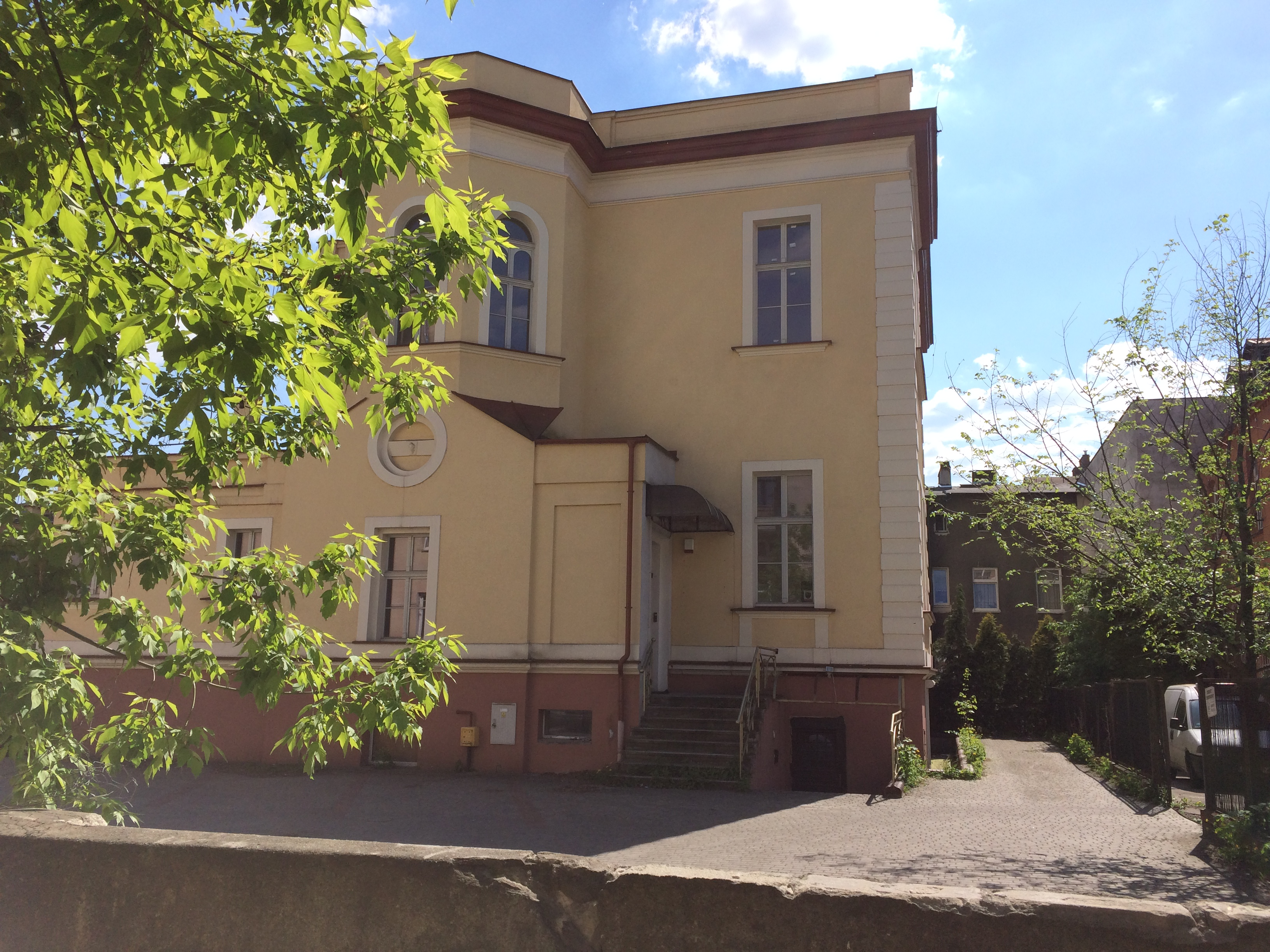
Front view

=== Tenement at 10, corner with 2 Kołłątaja street ===
Registered on Kuyavian-Pomeranian Voivodeship heritage list, Reg.A/1638, July 9, 2013

1901–1902, by George Weiß

Eclecticism, forms of Art Nouveau

Initially at the corner of Roonstraße and Bachmannstraße streets, the architect Georg Weiss made it his own house, before moving the second one he built in 1907 at 141 Gdańska Street. After the restoration of Poland in 1920 and the Peace of Riga with USSR, the edifice housed displaced Polish families from the Eastern Borderlands. At the end of World War II, the building was devastated by Soviet armed forces, which had a hospital here. After the war, the municipality took over the management of the tenement, being unable to find back its owner.

Perfectly refurbished in 2005, the house is among the highest decorated building in Bydgoszcz: Art Nouveau motifs enlightens the facades (women figures flanked by eagles, vases etc.). Today, it represents one of the pearls of Bydgoszcz architecture of the early 20th century.

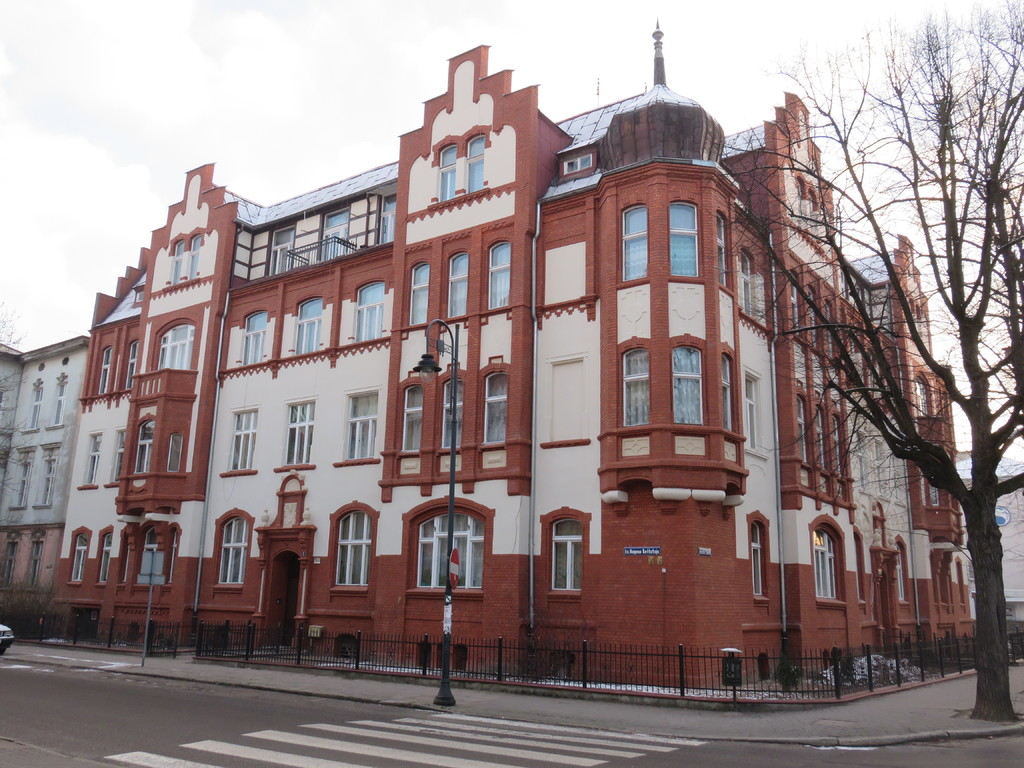
View of the corner

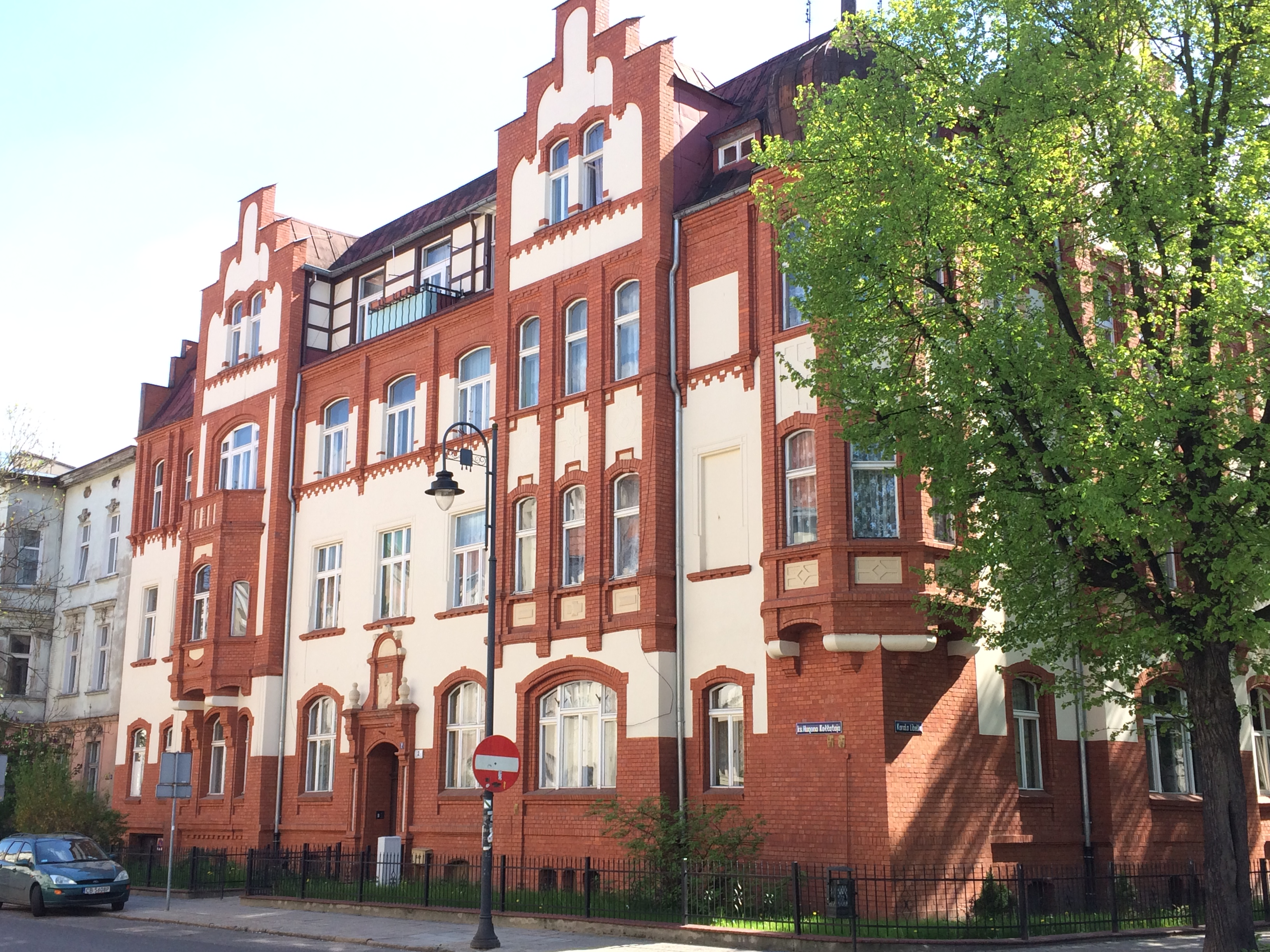
Facade on Hugo Kołłątaj Street

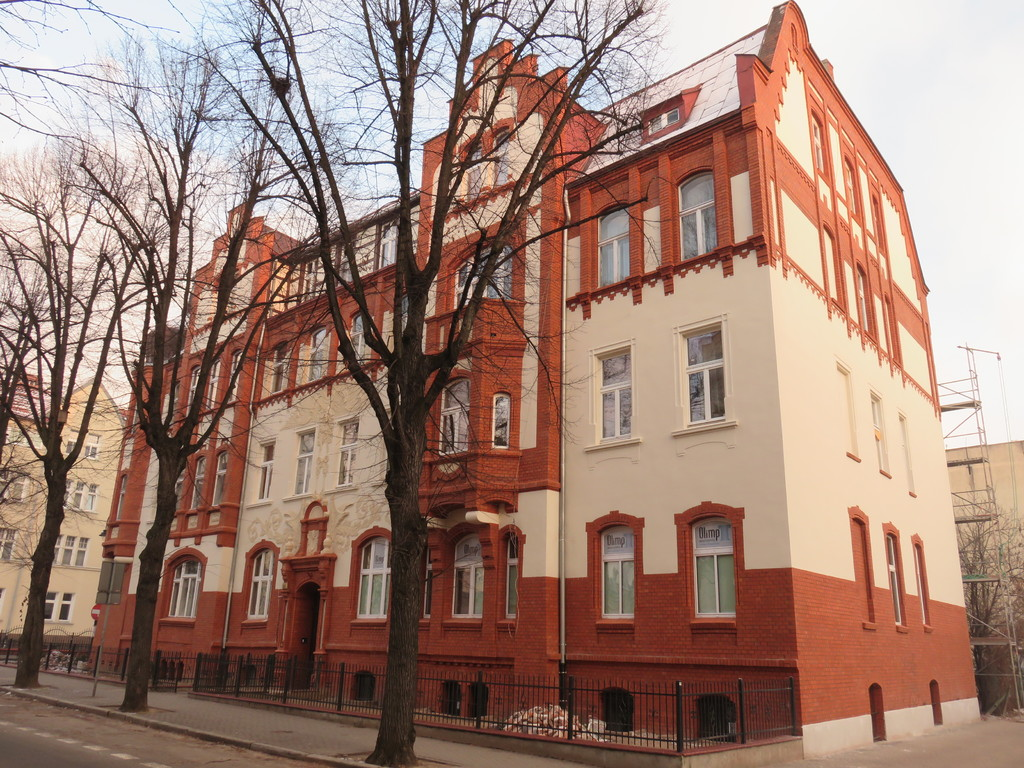
View from Libelta street

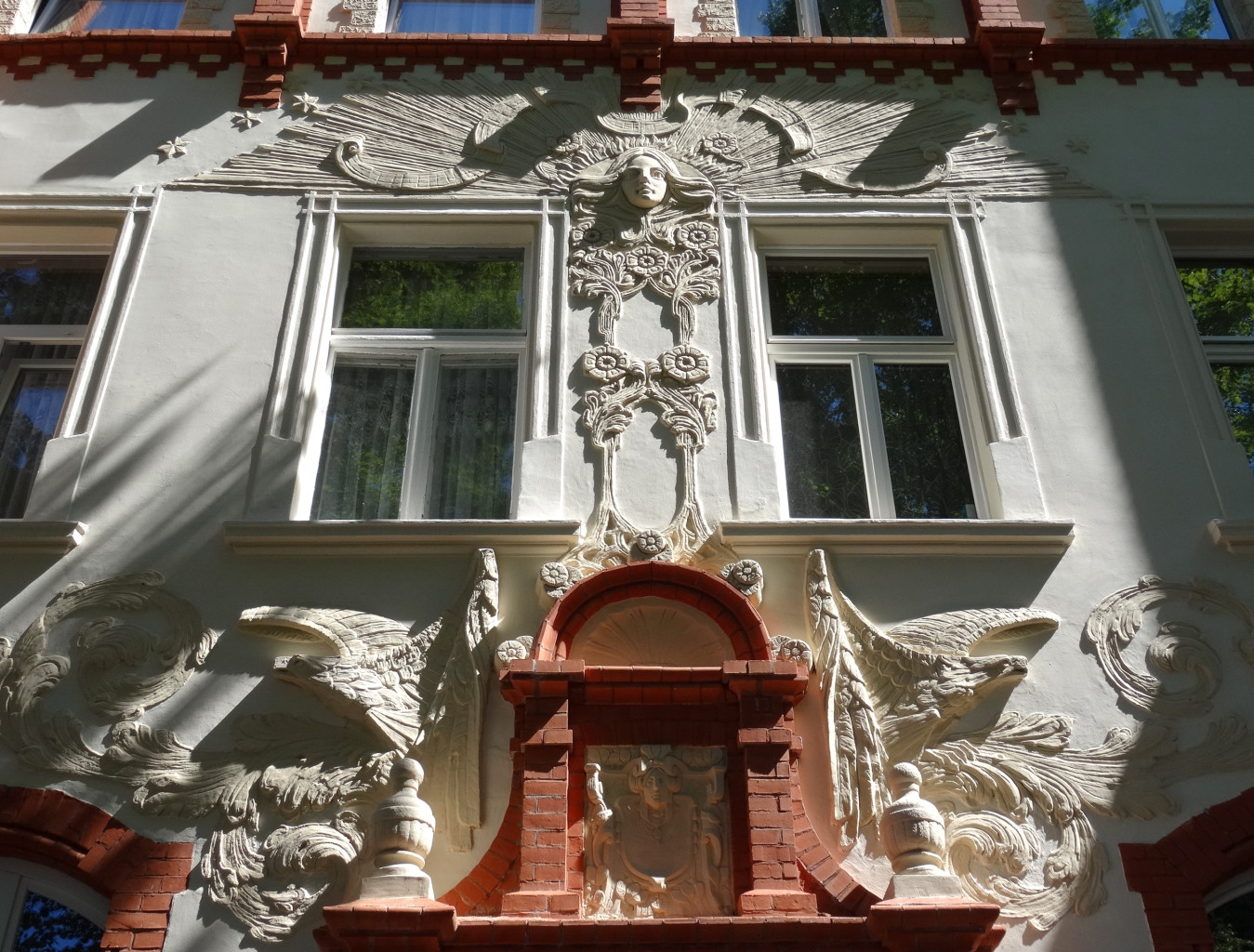
Motifs crowning the gate

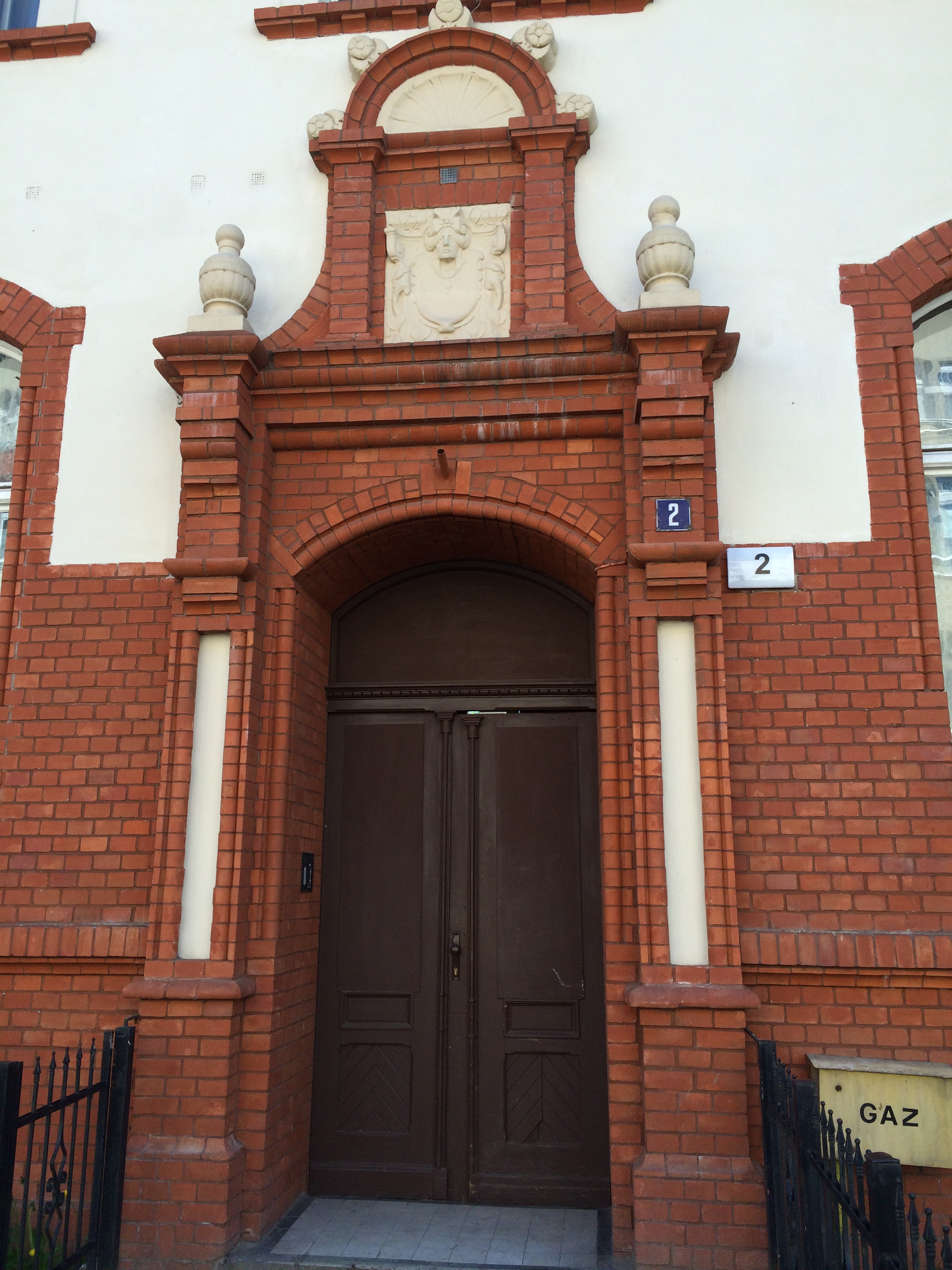
Gate on Kołłątaja street

=== Szwalbego Street ===
Arthur Rubinstein Music School building, at 1

First Municipal Music School in Bydgoszcz has been established in 1925. The Primary Music School is housed in this building since 1954, moving from a tenement at Gdańska Street 54. In 1991, the school receive the namesake of the great pianist Arthur Rubinstein: since 1993, every second year, is organised the International Competition for Young Pianists "Arthur Rubinstein in memoriam" sponsored by Eva Rubinstein, daughter of the artist.

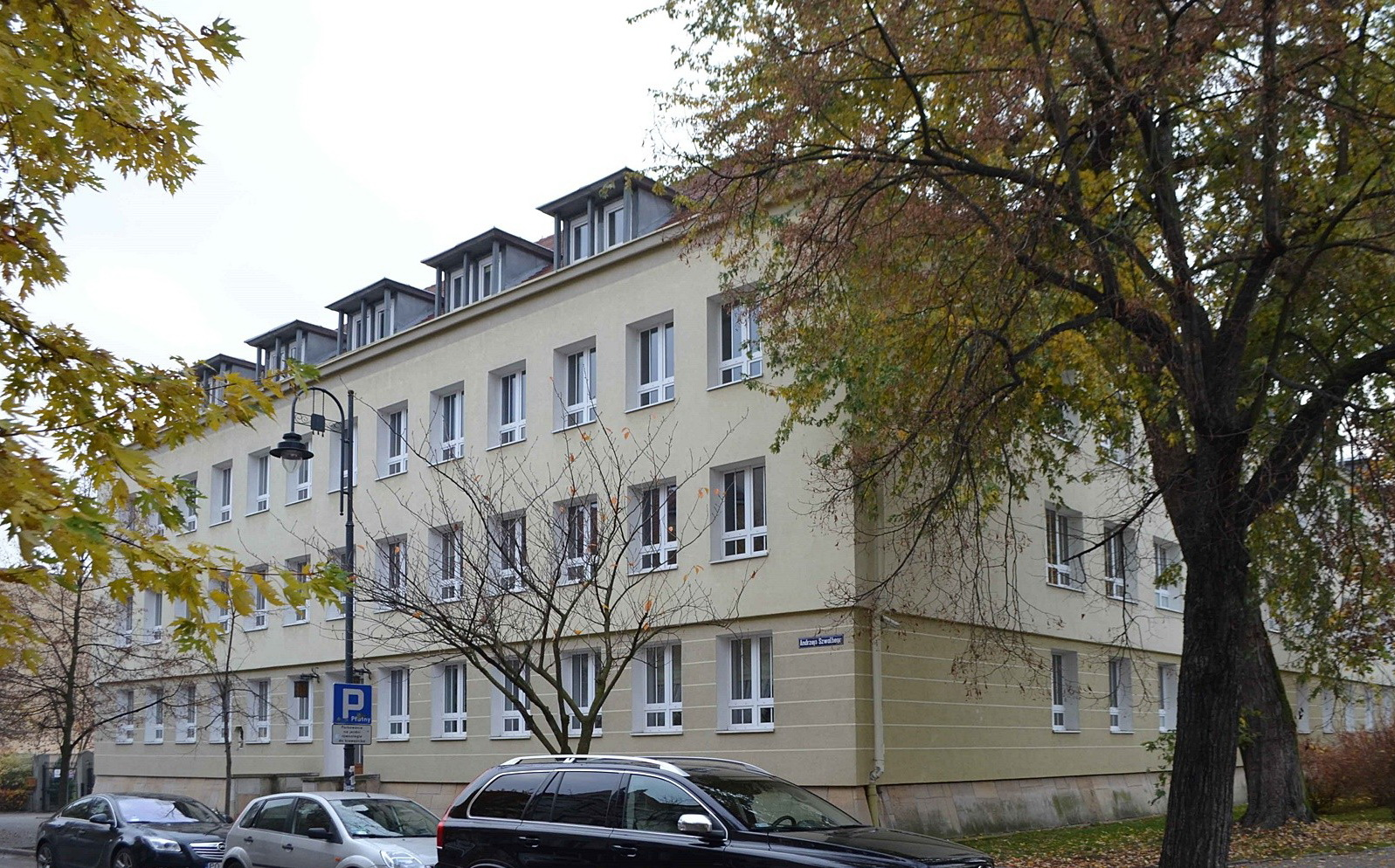
View from Szwalbego street

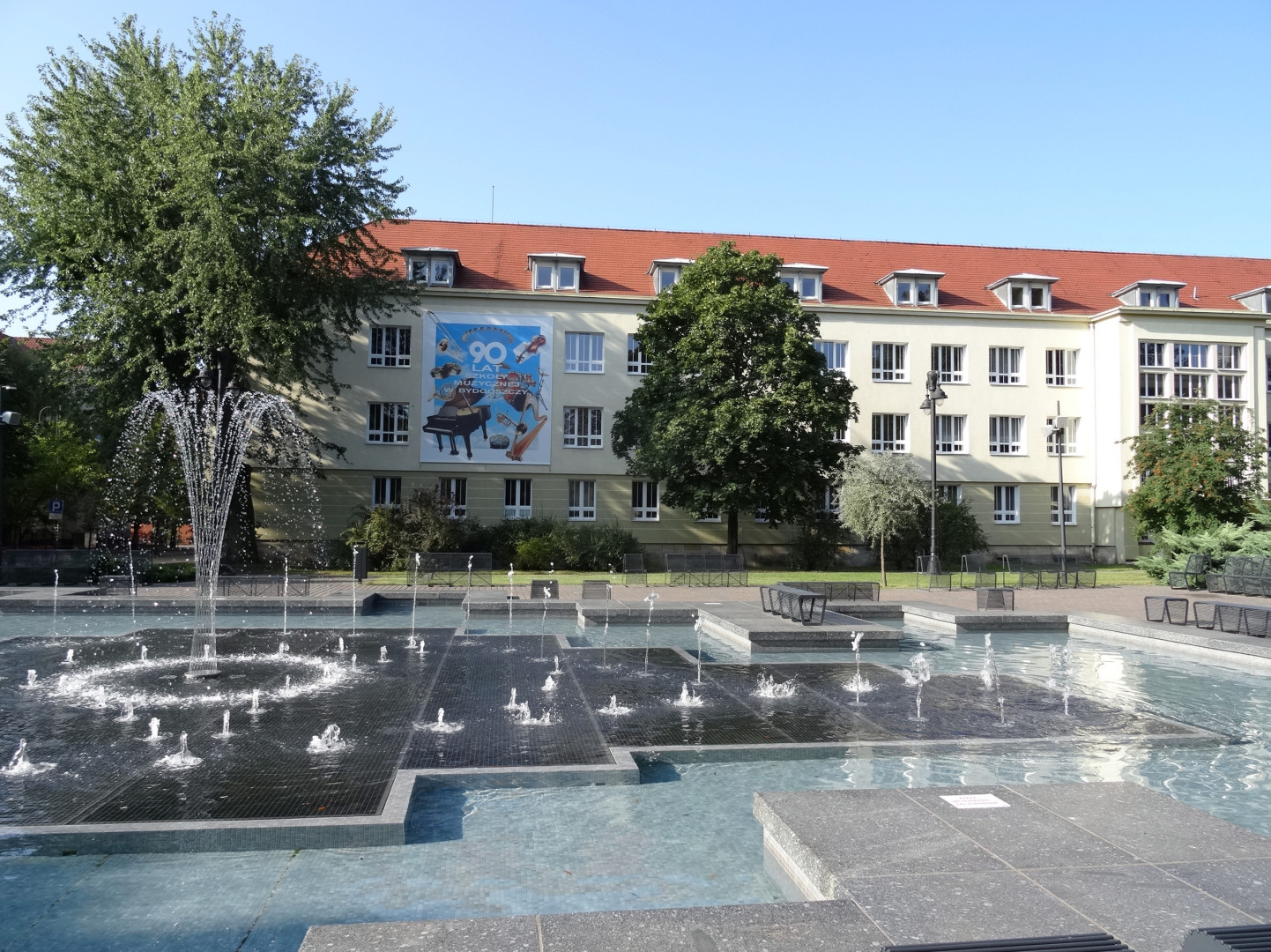
View with the multimedia fountain

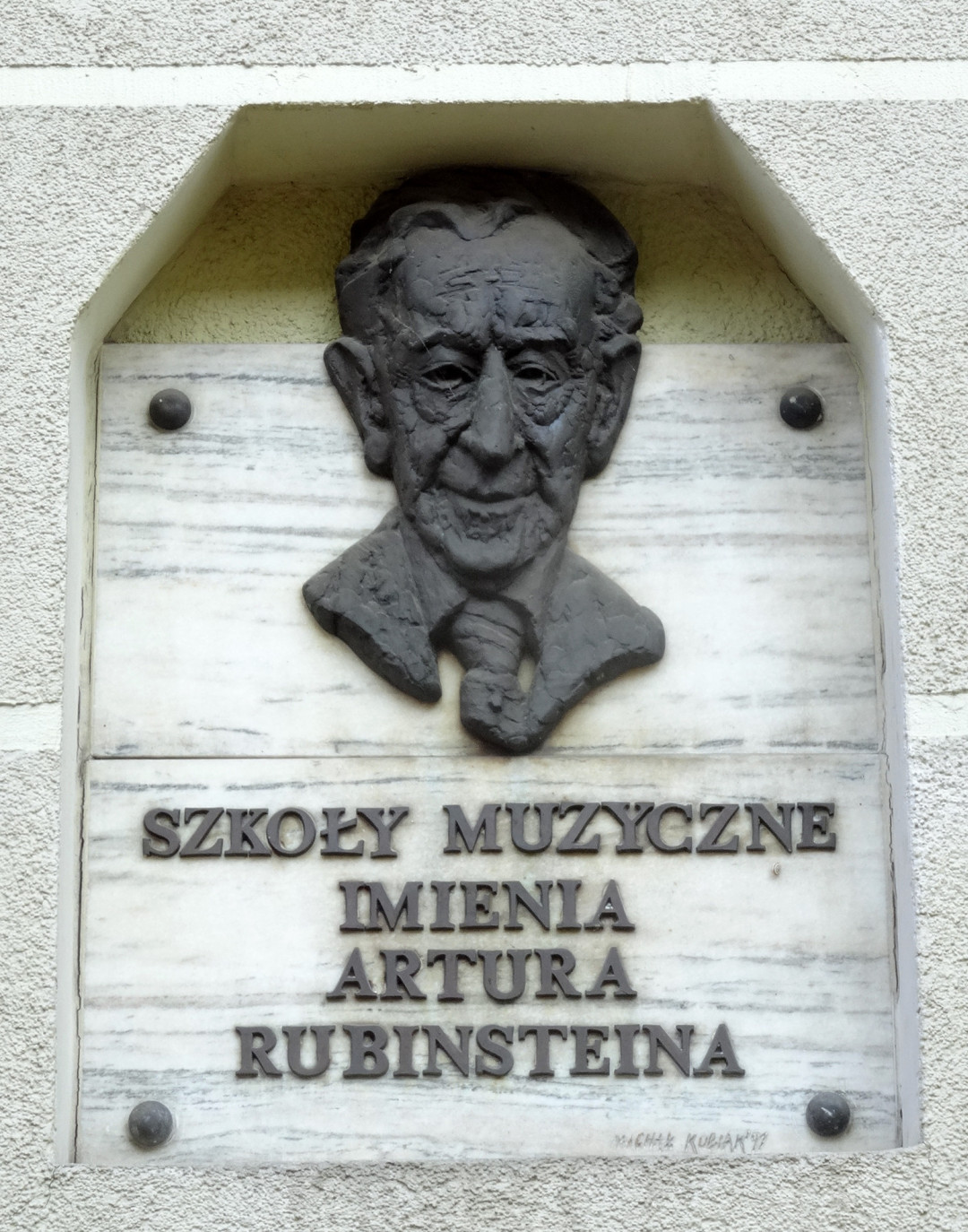
Sculpture commemorating Artur Rubinstein school patroning

=== Tenement at 2, corner with 1 Hugo Kołłątaj street ===
1911, by Fritz Weidner

Landhaus style, Eclecticism

Initial address was Roonstraße 8/9-Bachmannstraße 11, it then changed to Libelta street 12 before the creation of Szwalbego street. The tenement has been built for a German housing cooperative, German: Beamten wohnungsverein GmbH. In 1920, it moved to its Polish equivalent structure, Polish: Towarzystwo mieszkaniowe.

The style reminds German Mansion (German: Landhaus) outfits, with massive bay windows, variously shaped gables and asymmetry of the facade, for which Fritz Weidner was prone to. In 1909–1910, this house was identified as part of the winning selection in the Bromberg municipal competition for the most beautiful frontage.

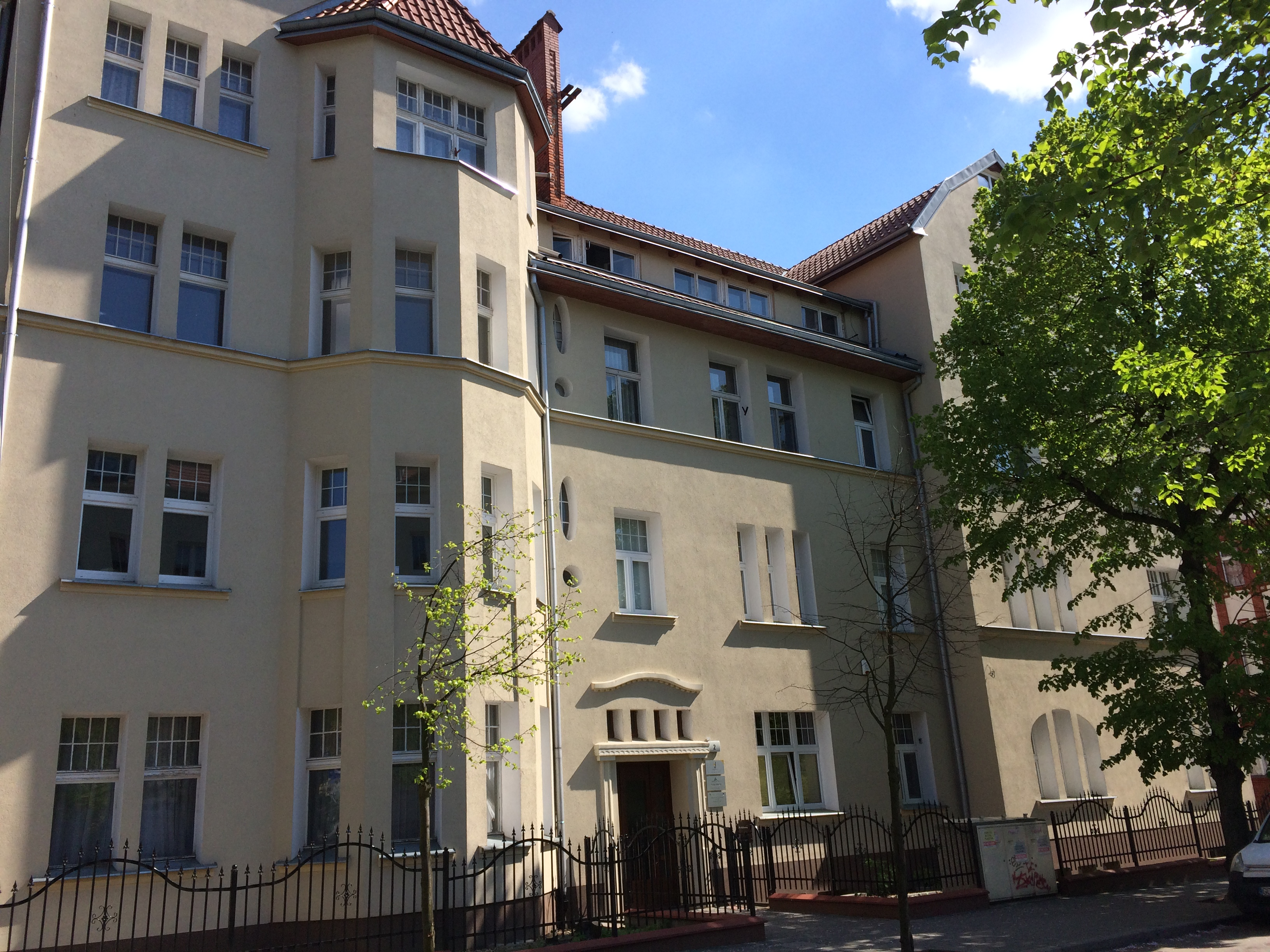
Facade on Szwalbego street

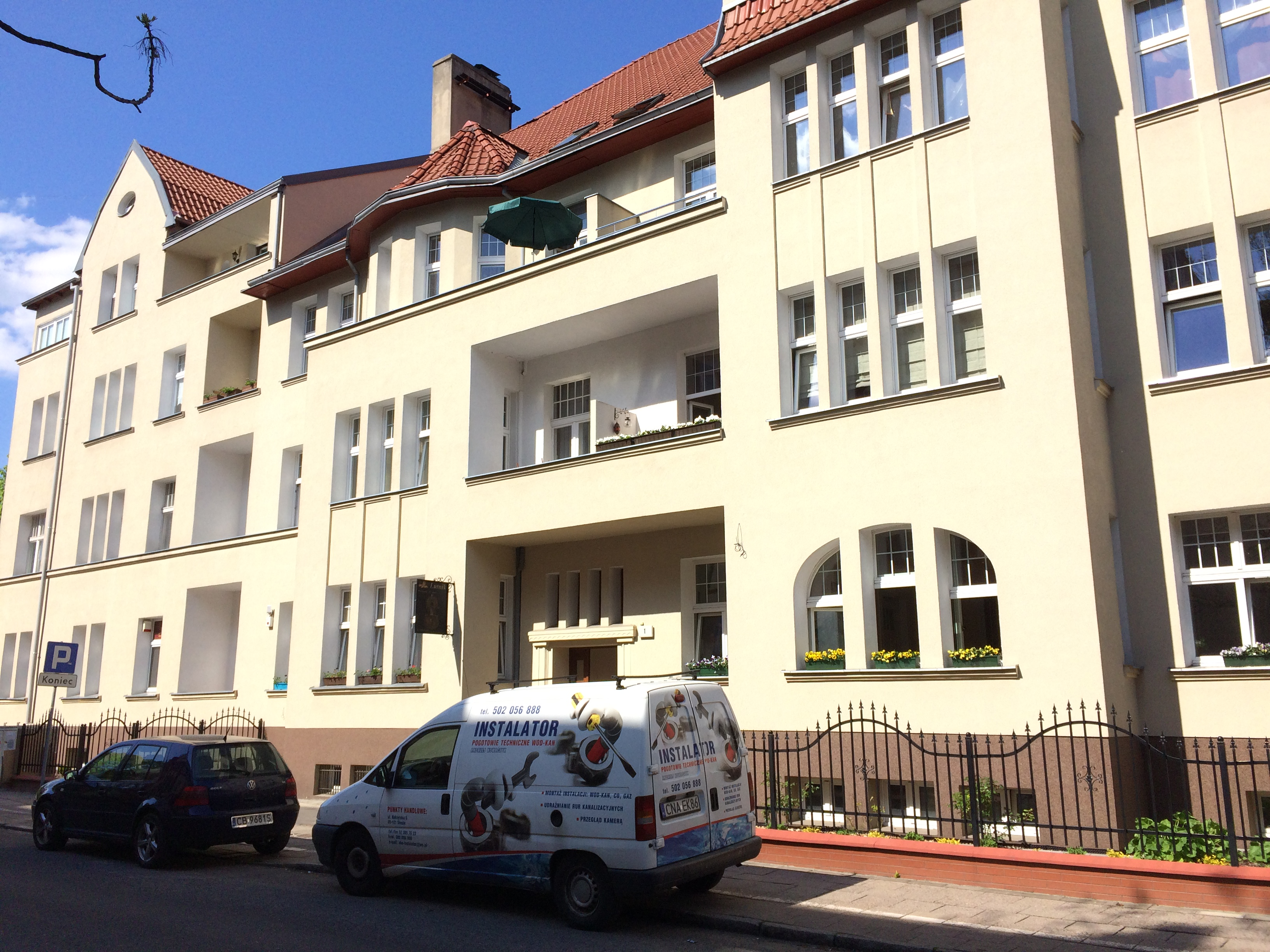
Facade on Hugo Kołłątaj street

=== Tenement at 4 ===
Registered on Kuyavian-Pomeranian Voivodeship heritage list, Nr.601375, Reg. A/991, October 1, 1991

1904–1905

Eclecticism

The first landlord of the tenement at then Bachmannstraße 12 was Emil Dittmann, a merchant. The gate still displays a cartouche with his interlaced initials ED. Today the building houses rooms for students from the Bydgoszcz Music Academy "Feliks Nowowiejski", located in the vicinity.

The tenement has the size of a large mansion, displaying balconies above the gate, an avant-corps, two peaked gables and French-window dormers giving on terraces. The elevation is richly decorated with vegetal motifs.

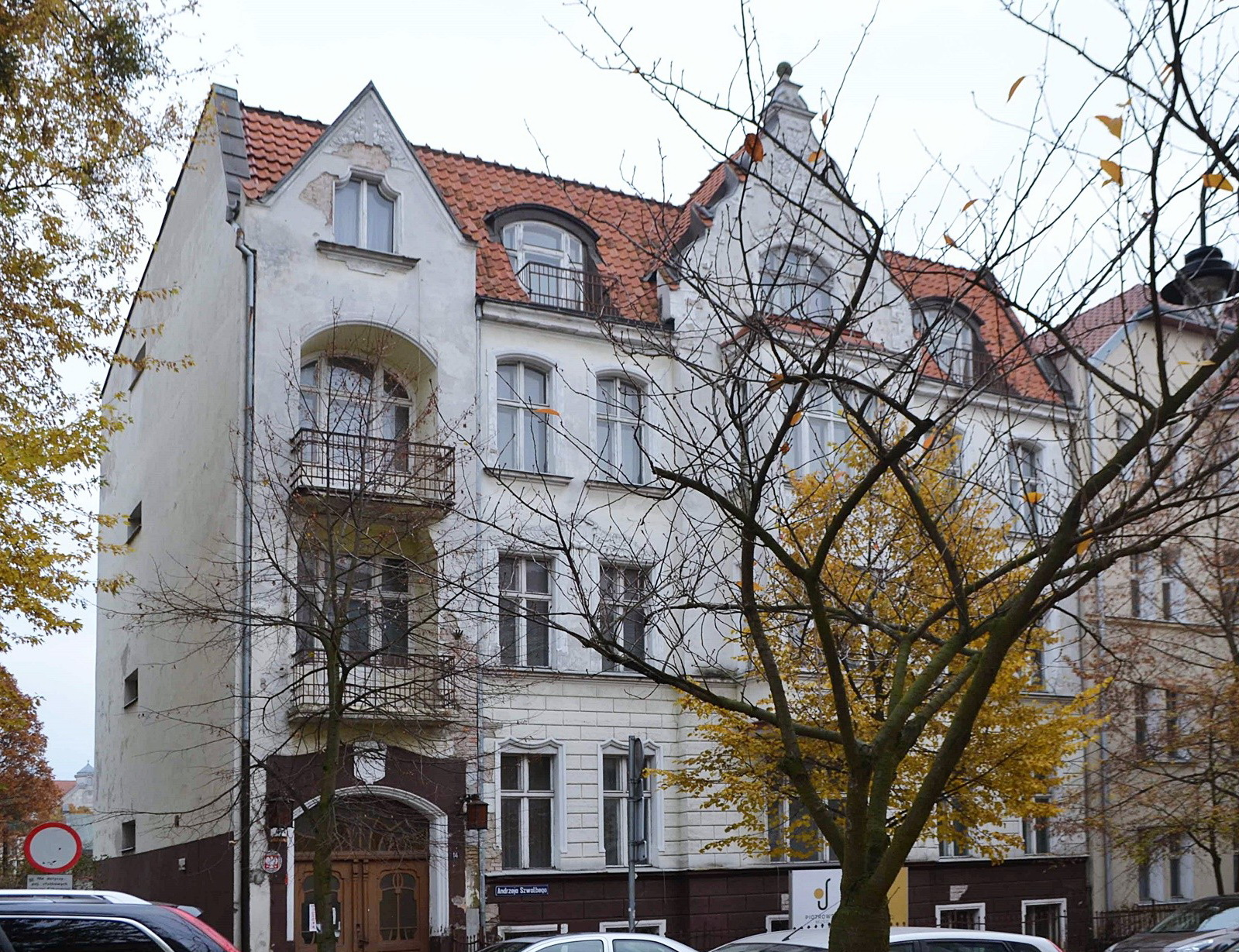
View of the building from Szwalbego street

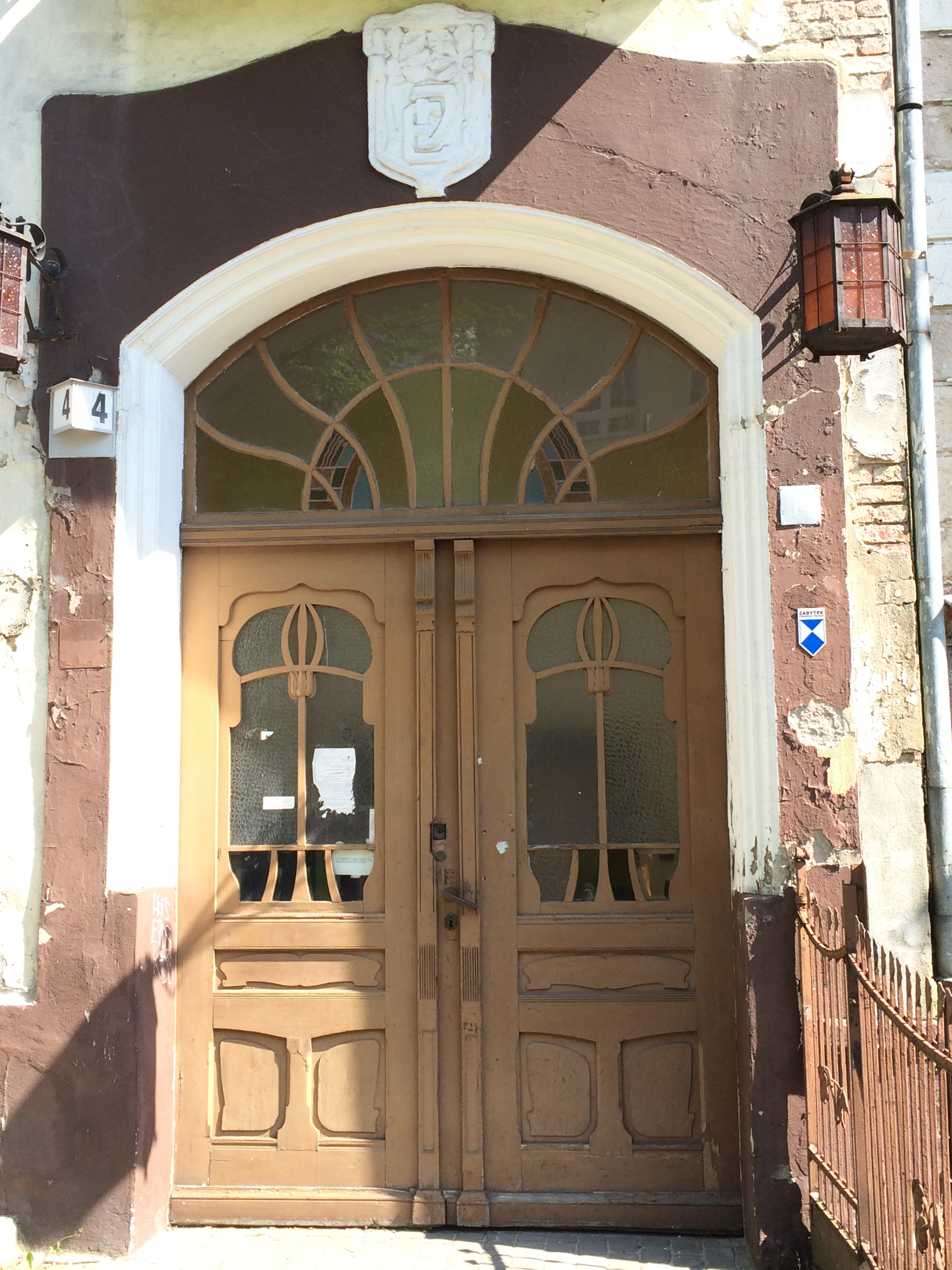
Main gate topped with "ED" initials of the first owner

== See also ==
- Bydgoszcz
- Fritz Weidner
- Bydgoszcz Architects (1850-1970s)
- Adam Grzymała-Siedlecki
- Casimir the Great Park
- Bydgoszcz Music Academy - "Feliks Nowowiejski"

== Bibliography ==
- (in Polish) Obiezierska, Helena (1995). Jedno zycie prywatne na tle zycia narodu polskiego w wieku XX. Biblioteka wilenskich rozmaitosci.
