= Andrzej Rej =

Andrzej Rej may refer to:

- Andrzej Rej (starost) (died 1664), Polish governor
- Andrzej Rej (diplomat) (1584–1641), Polish diplomat
