= Rej (name) =

Rej can be a masculine given name or a surname. Notable people with the name include:

== Given name ==
- Rej Volpato (born 1986), Italian football striker

== Surname ==
- Andrzej Rej (diplomat), Polish diplomat
- Andrzej Rej (starost), Polish nobleman
- Mia Rej (born 1990), Danish handball player
- Mikołaj Rej, Polish poet
