= Mikołaja Reja Street, Bydgoszcz =

Street in Bydgoszcz, Poland

Coordinates: 53°07′34″N 18°00′28″E

Mikołaja Reja Street
Bydgoszcz
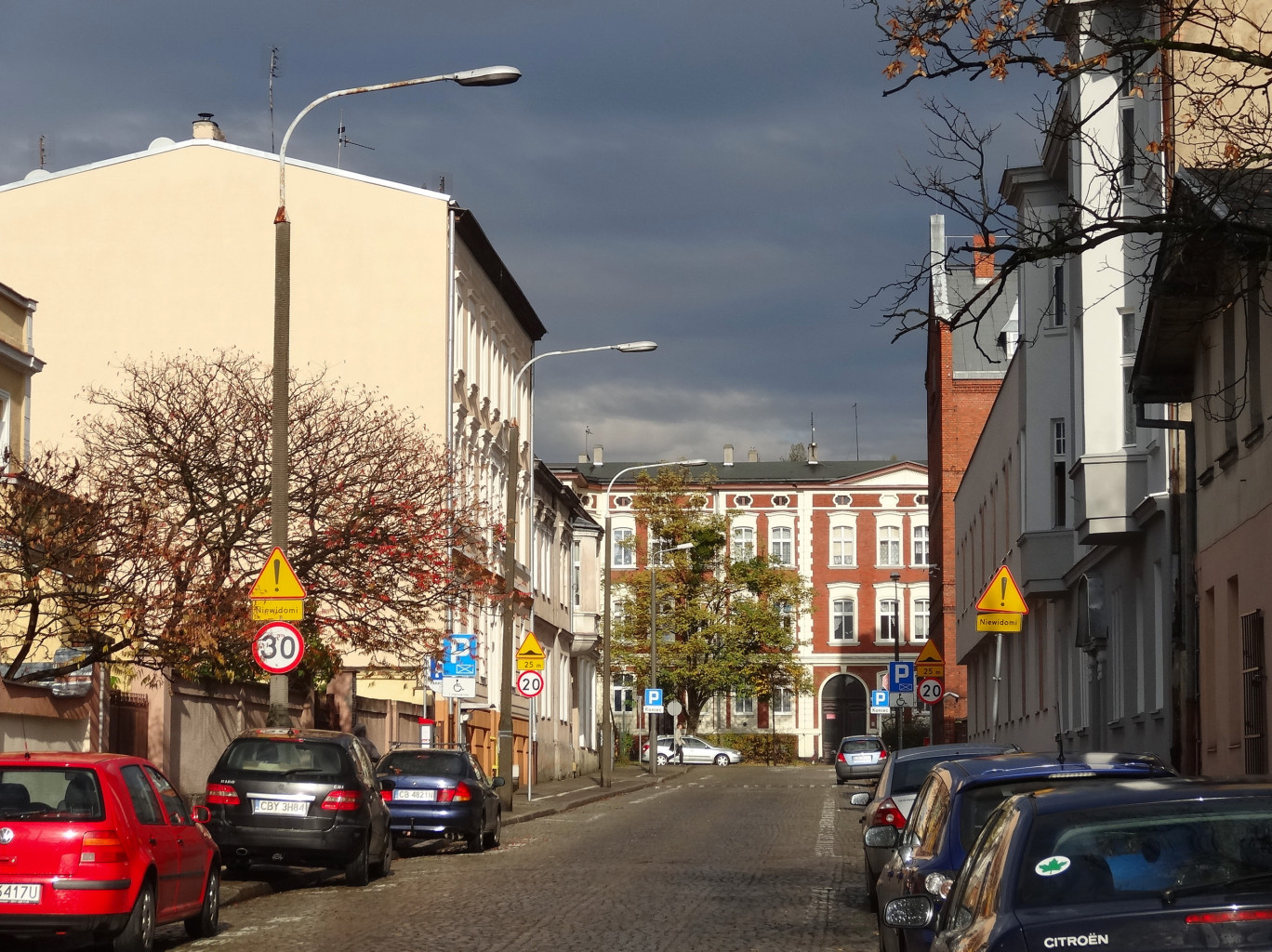
- Northward view of Piotra Skargi street

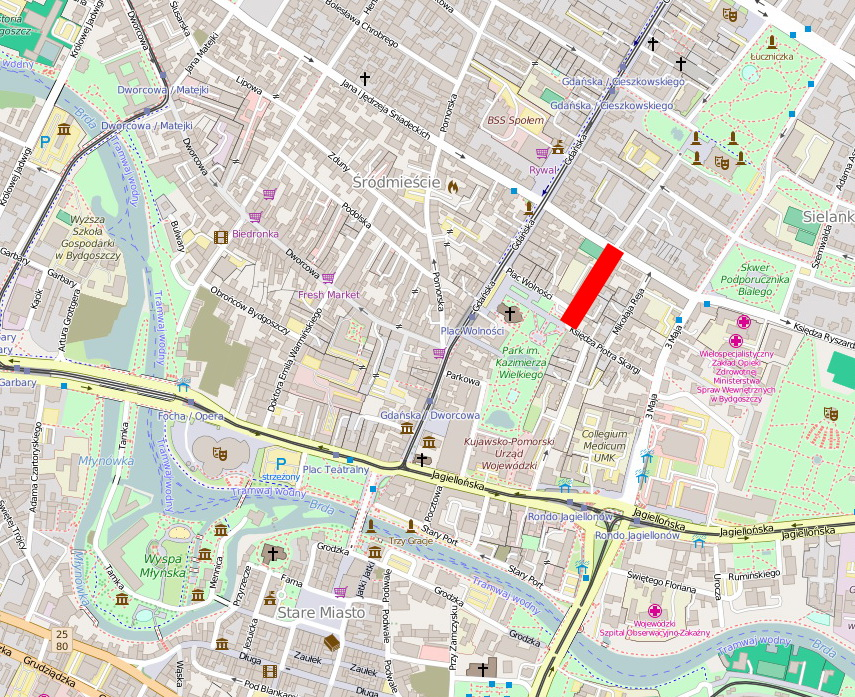
- Location of Mikołaja Reja Street in Bydgoszcz
- Native name: Ulica Mikołaja Reja (Polish)
- Former name: Gräfe straße
- Namesake: Mikołaj Rej
- Owner: City of Bydgoszcz
- Length: 160 m (520 ft); Google maps
- Area: Downtown district
- Location: Bydgoszcz, Poland

Construction
- Construction start: 1860s
- Completed: 1872

Mikołaja Reja Street is a historical street of downtown Bydgoszcz.

== Location ==
This short street, aligned from north to south, connects Piotra Skargi and Zygmunt Krasiński Streets.

== History ==
The street is not mentioned on maps before the second half of the 19th century. Mentioned in a 1855 address book as Grostwo, a Bromberg map of 1876 by Paul Berthold Jaekel features a north–south axis bearing the name Gräfe Straße. On this document, like on other maps, the building of the House for blind children - German: Blinden-Anstalt- appears at the northern tip of the street

Through history, the street bore the following names:

- Until 1859, Grostwo village;
- 1859–1920, Gräfe straße;
- 1920–1939, Mikołaj Rej Street;
- 1939–1945, Gräfe straße;
- since 1945, Mikołaj Rej Street.

Current patron of the street is Mikołaj Rej (1505–1569), a Polish poet and prose writer, politician and musician. He was the first Polish author to write exclusively in Polish, and he is considered with Biernat of Lublin and Jan Kochanowski, to be one of the founders of standard Polish and Polish literature.

== Main edifices ==
=== Tenement at the corner with 5 Piotra Skargi Street ===
1880s

Secession

This tenement at then Hoffmann straße 2 was the property of Ms Raaß in 1882, then of Emma Stengert.

None of the original frontage decoration survived. The main elevation is topped by a large triangular pediment. The side facade on Mikołaja Reja street displays a mural painting, "Self-determination" (Polish: Samookreślenie), one of 20 pieces in Bydgoszcz streets.

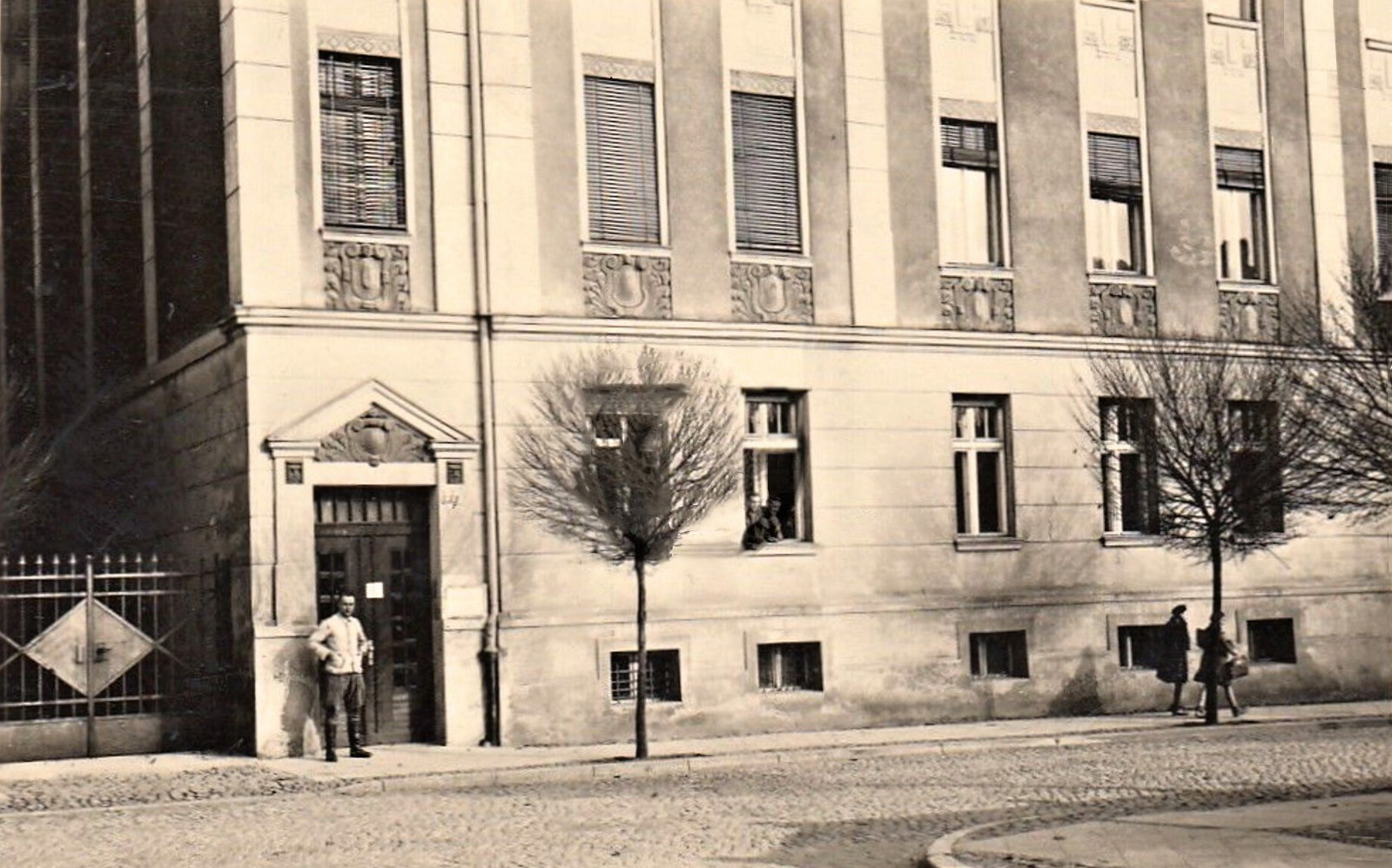
View ca 1945

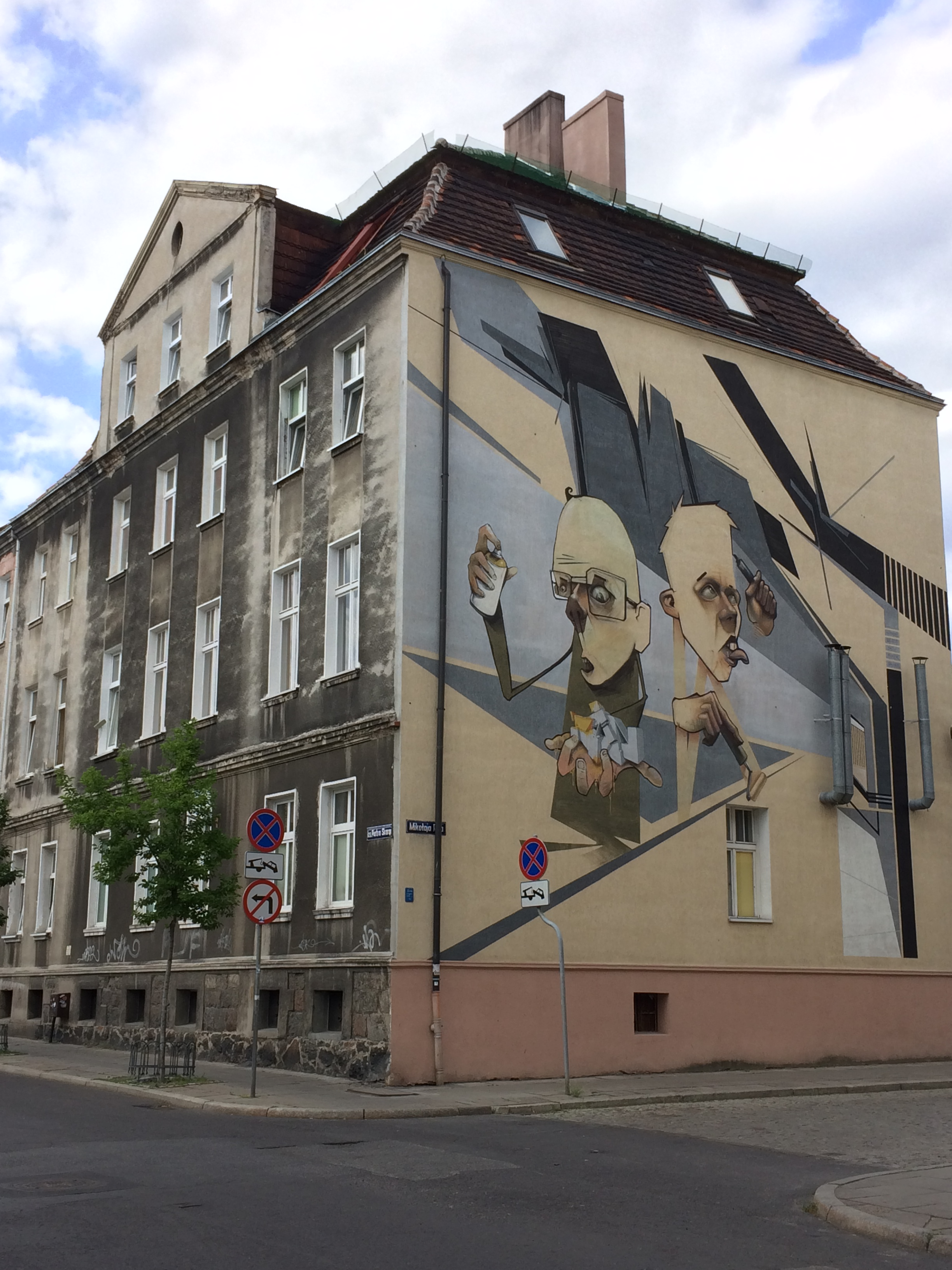
View from the street

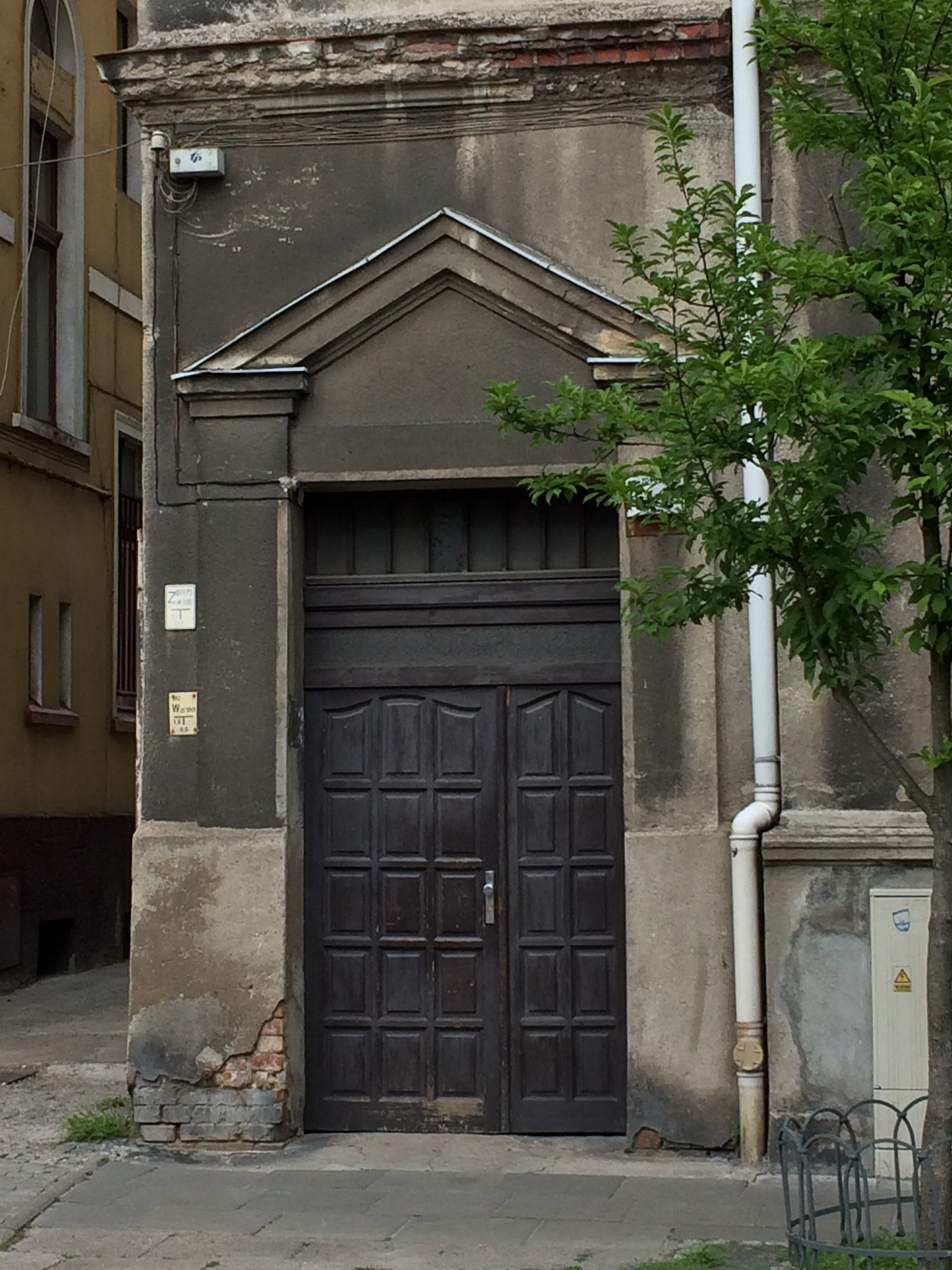
Main gate

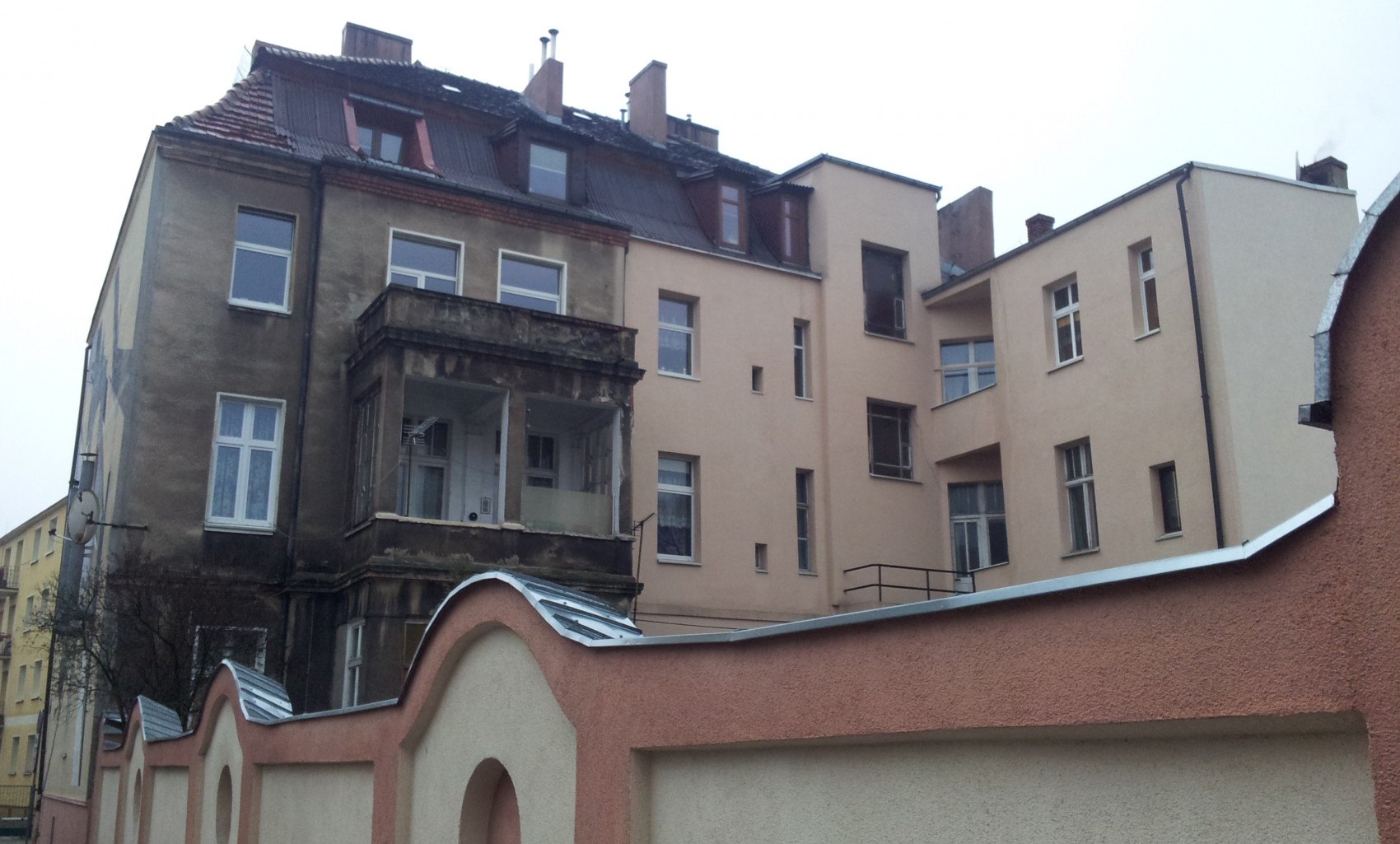
Back view

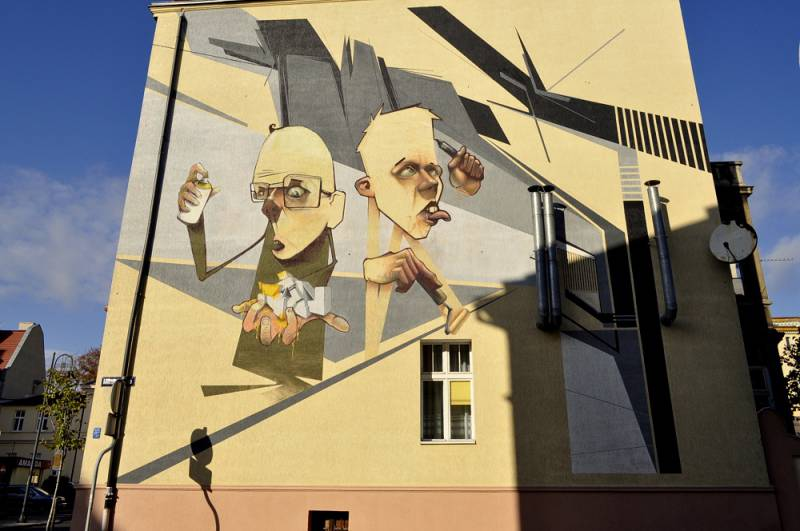
Wall painting at Nr.5

=== Tenement at the corner with 7 Piotra Skargi Street ===
Early 1880s

Eclecticism

Dr Agnes Schulß, a head teacher, was the first landlord of this tenement at then Hoffmann straße 3. She lived there until the end of World War I. It then moved in the 1920s to the hand of Leon Wawrzkiewicz, a manufacturer. Today, the edifice houses, among others, the "Paderewski Music Society in Bydgoszcz" (Polish: Towarzystwo Muzyczne im. I. J. Paderewskiego w Bydgoszczy), a cultural association engaged in the development of music and musical culture in the city. This association organizes every 3 years the "International Paderewski Piano Competition" in Bydgoszcz: the 10th occurrence will happen from 6 to 20 November 2016.

The facade on Piotra Skargi Street is rather common, except some nice palmette motifs inscribed in cartouches. On the other hand, the elevation on Mikołaj Rej street reveals more decorative features with vegetal ornaments and a stylized festoon topped by an oeil-de-boeuf. This side of the tenement gives access to a garden, overlooked by a balcony. The wall of the garden on Mikołaja Reja street displays a mural painting, "Time" (Polish: Czas), by Bezt, Sainer, Pain, Pener, and Autone, one of 20 pieces in Bydgoszcz facades.

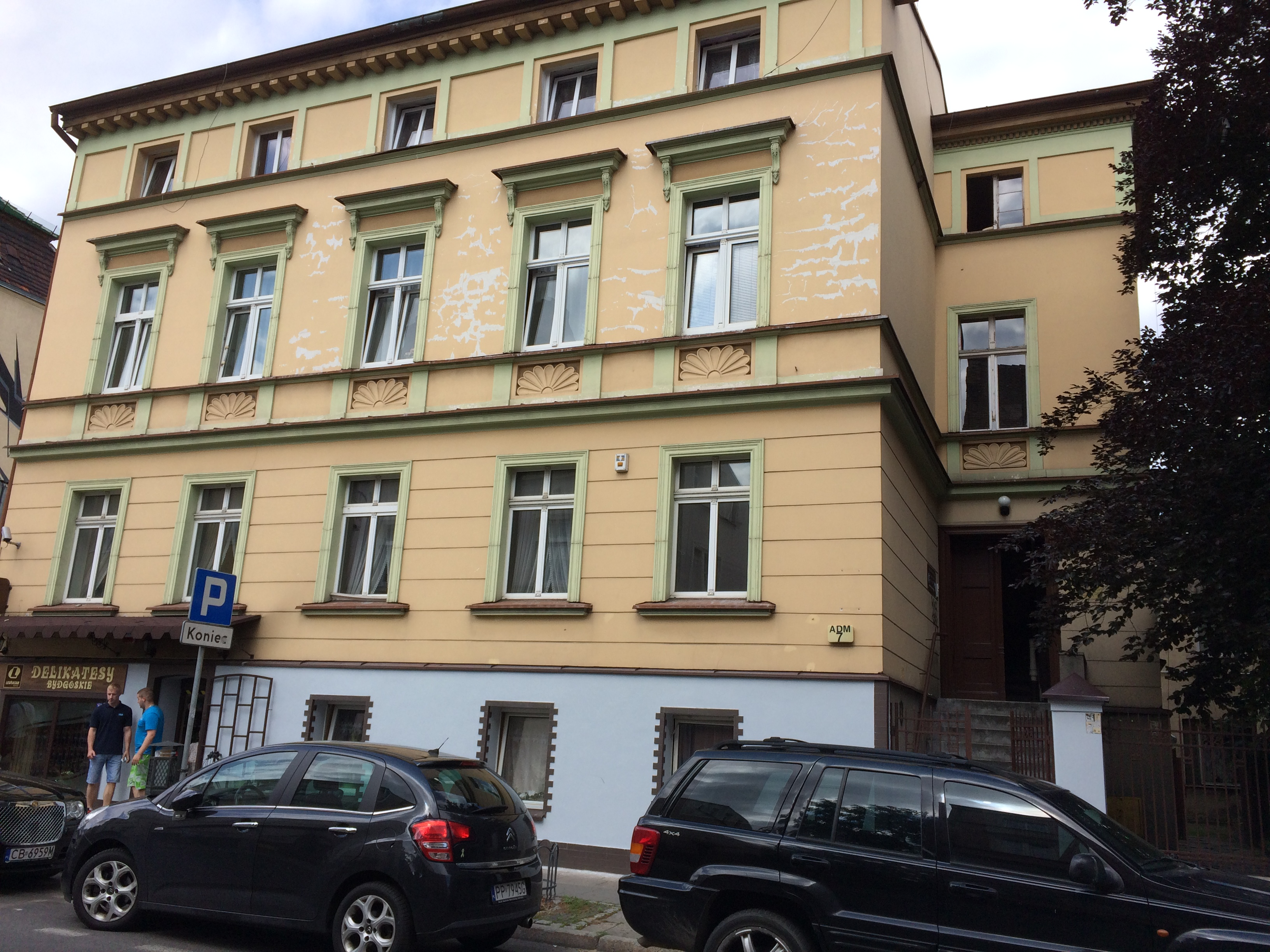
Main elevation from the street

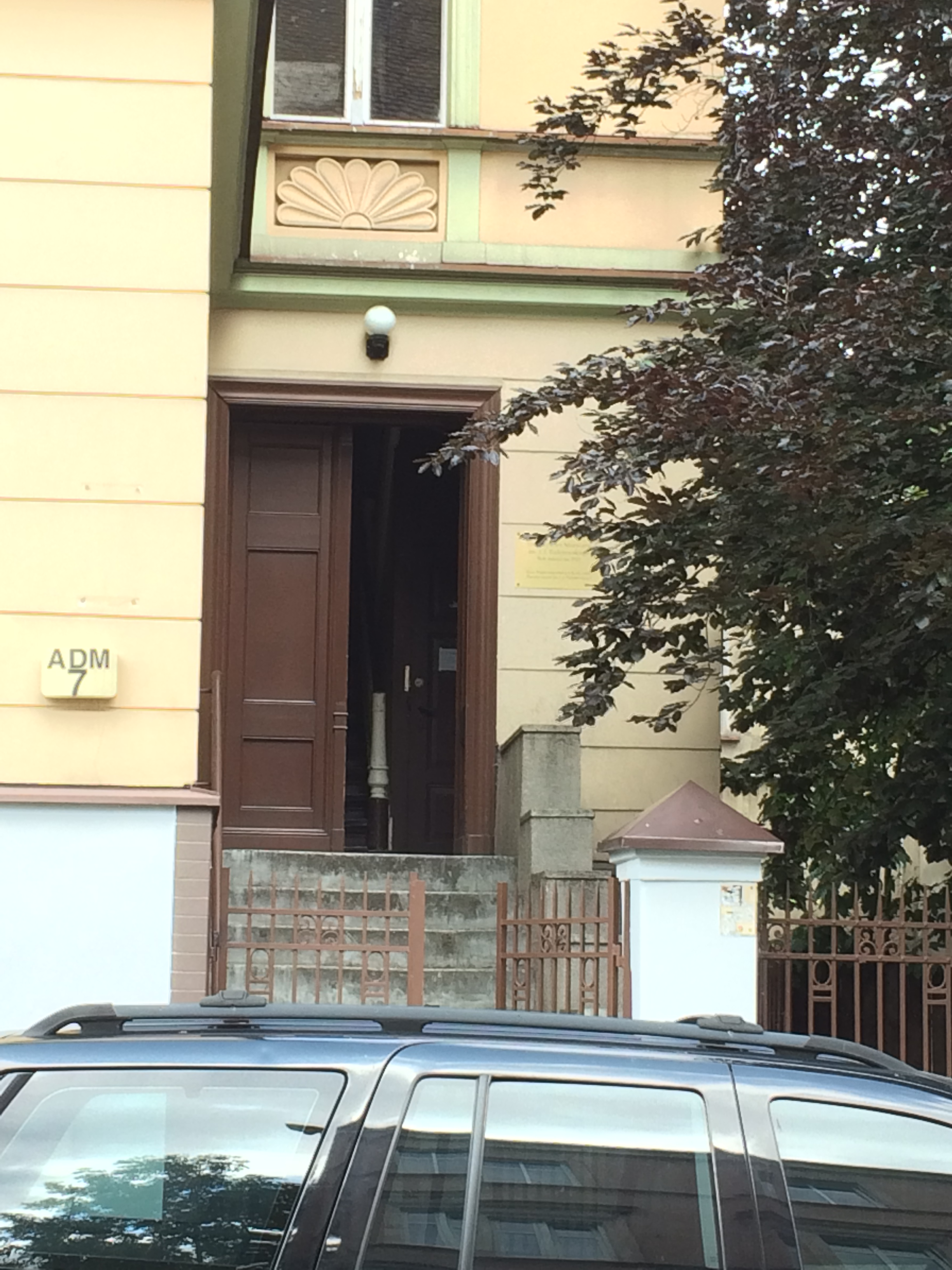
Entry gate

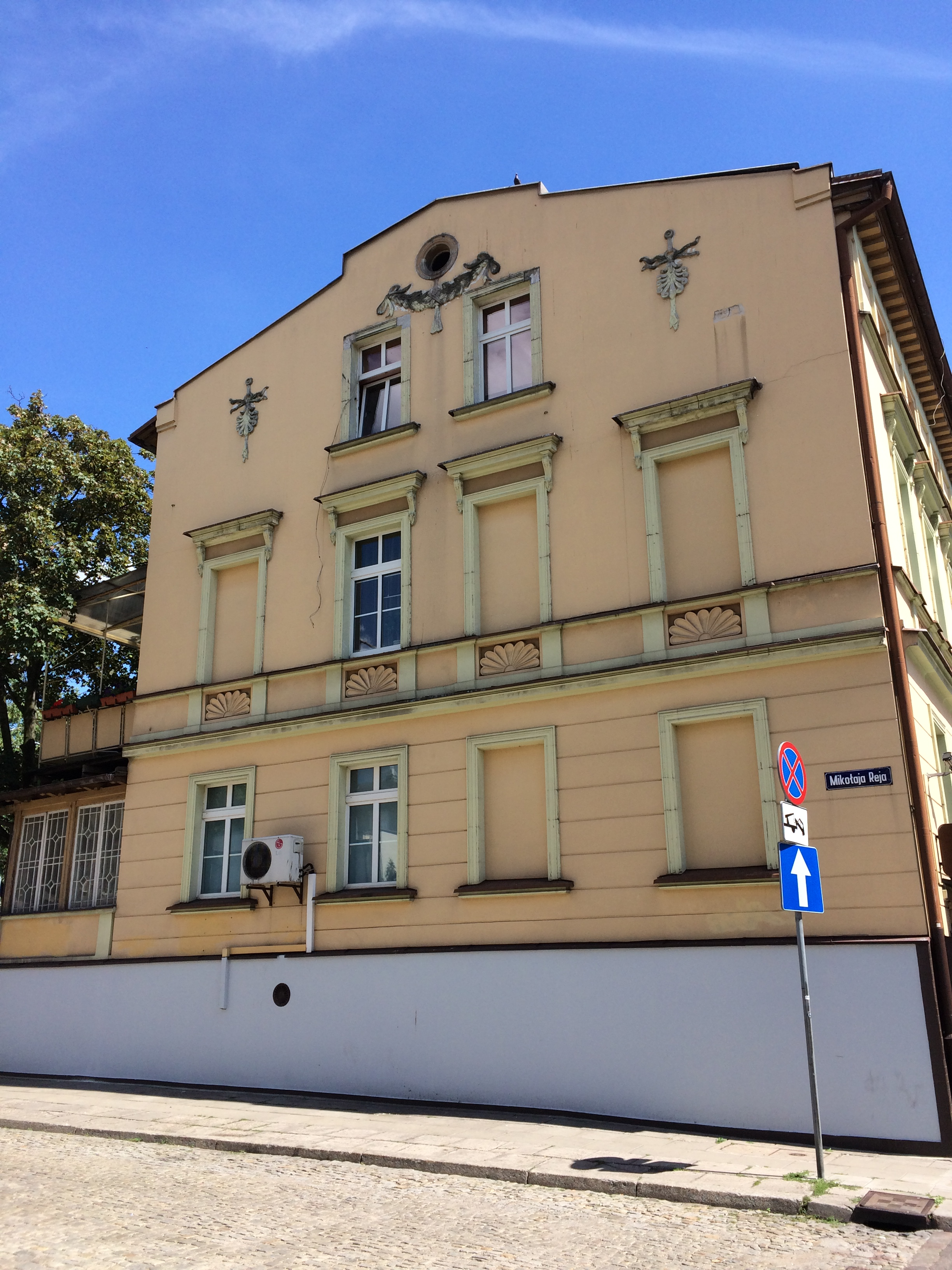
Side facade view

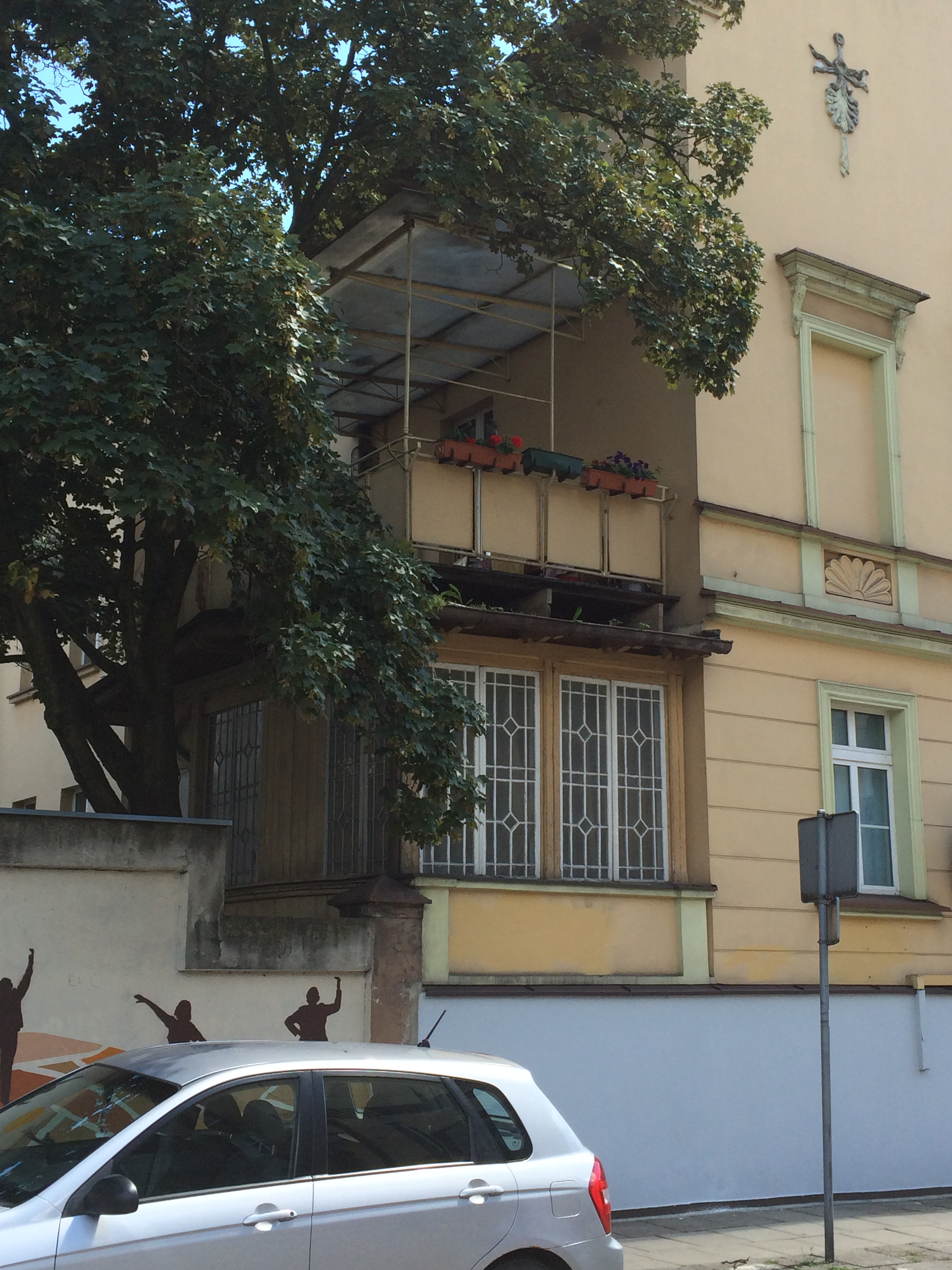
Garden and balcony

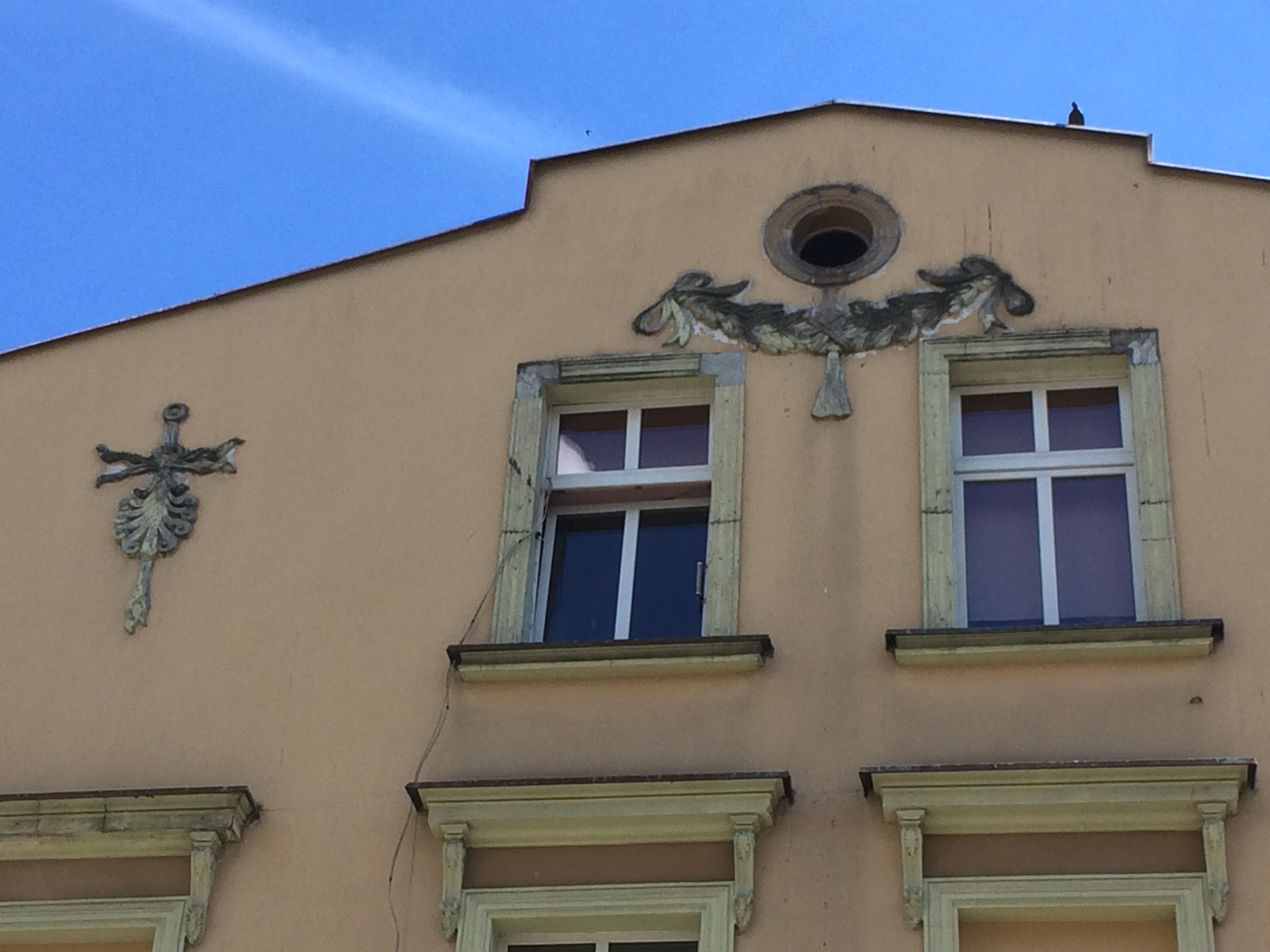
Side facade ornamentation

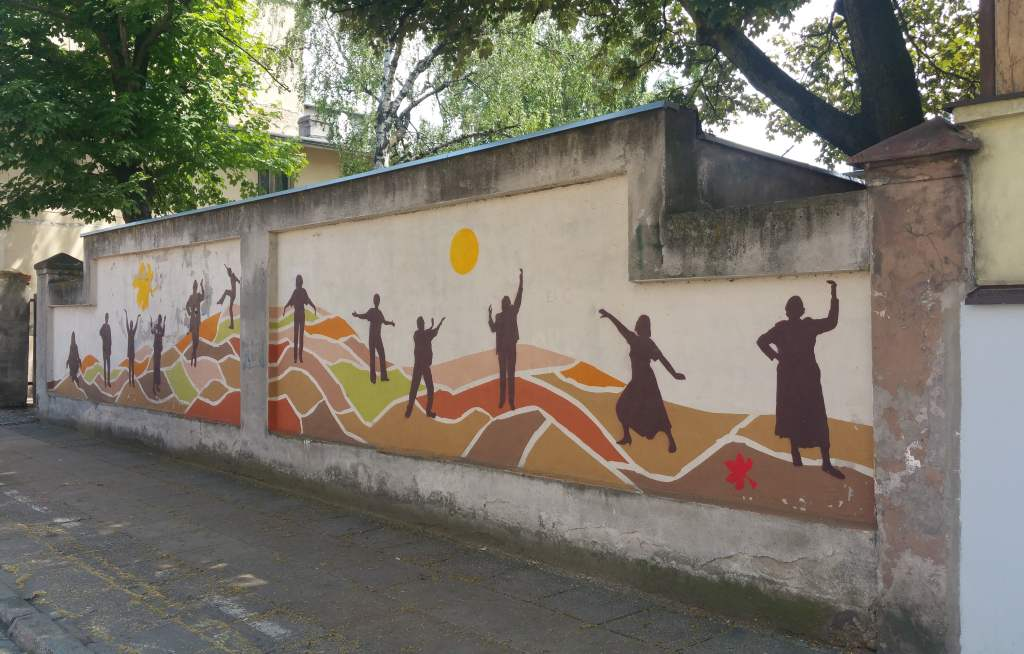
Mural painting, "Time"

=== House at 2 ===
1850-1875

Eclecticism

The house at then Hoffmann straße 7 was initially owned by Franz Krüger, a carpenter. In the 1920s, the villa was the property of the landlord of the corner house at Piotra Skargi Street N°7, Leon Wawrzkiewicz, a manufacturer.

The house stands out in the street as one of the only villa onto the street, surrounded by higher tenements. One can notice the nicely wood carved motif adorning the outside cross tie beam.

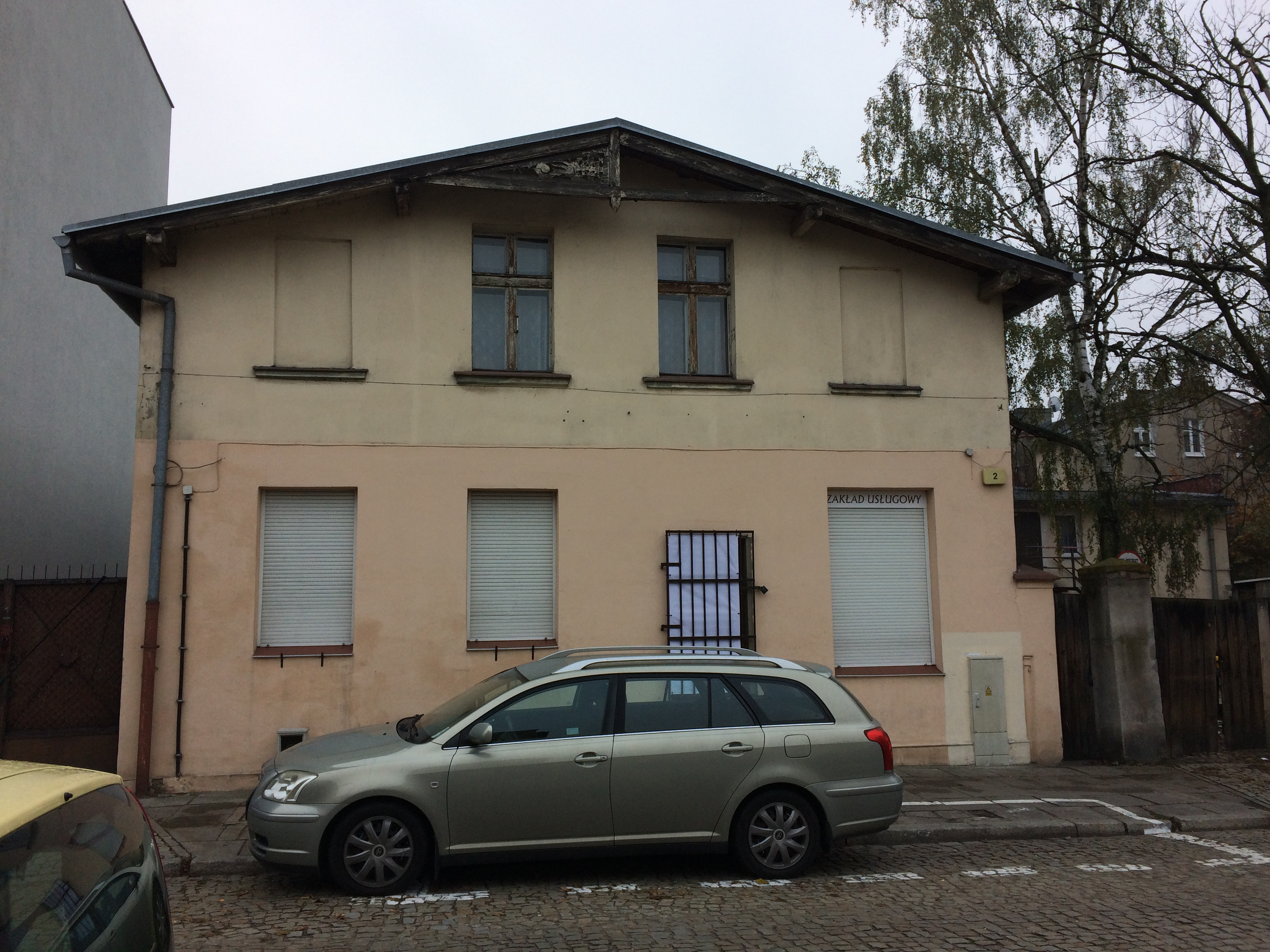
Facade on the street

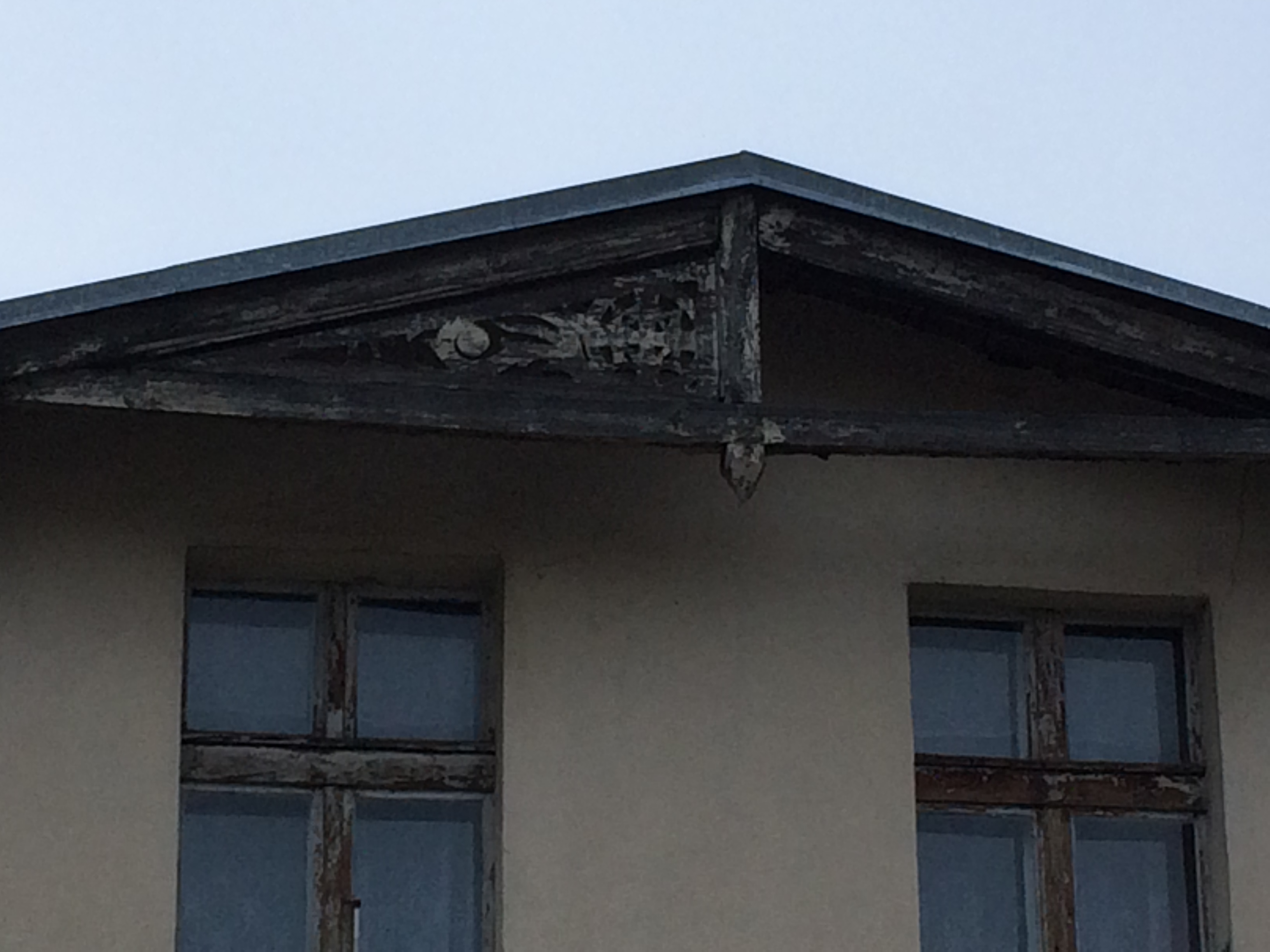
Wood carving detail

=== Tenement at 3 ===
1878

Eclecticism

The house at then Gräfe straße 2 was built for a mason, R. U. Th. Schulße. In 1888, it moved to Albertine König, who set up a pension at the place. The facility has been running till 1920 and the return of Bydgoszcz to Polish territory. Today, the edifice houses the seat of the St Peter's and St Paul's parish, which church is located a hundred metres away, on Plac Wolności.

The villa displays a nice wavy gable and a roofed avant-corps onto the courtyard.

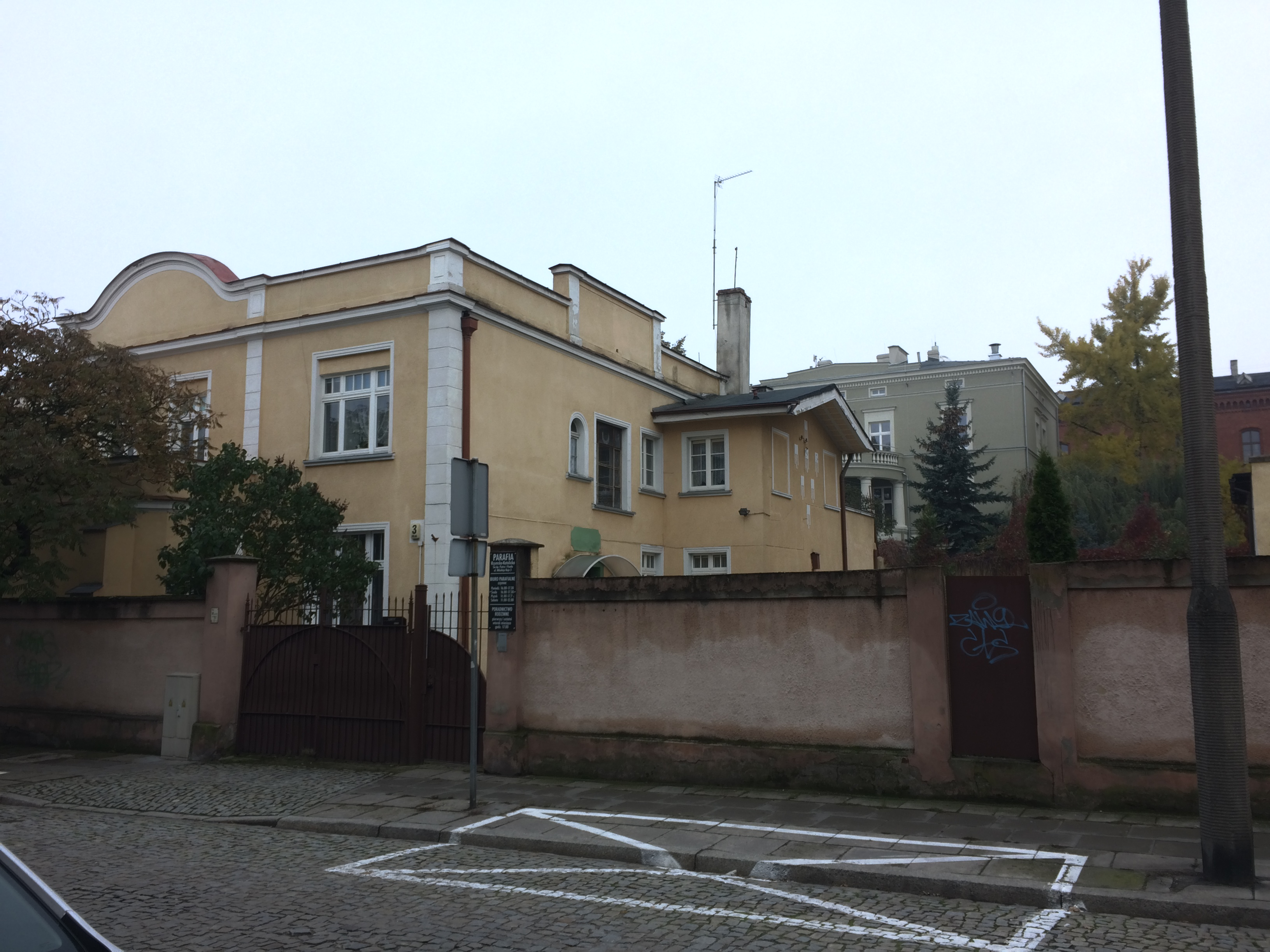
View from the street

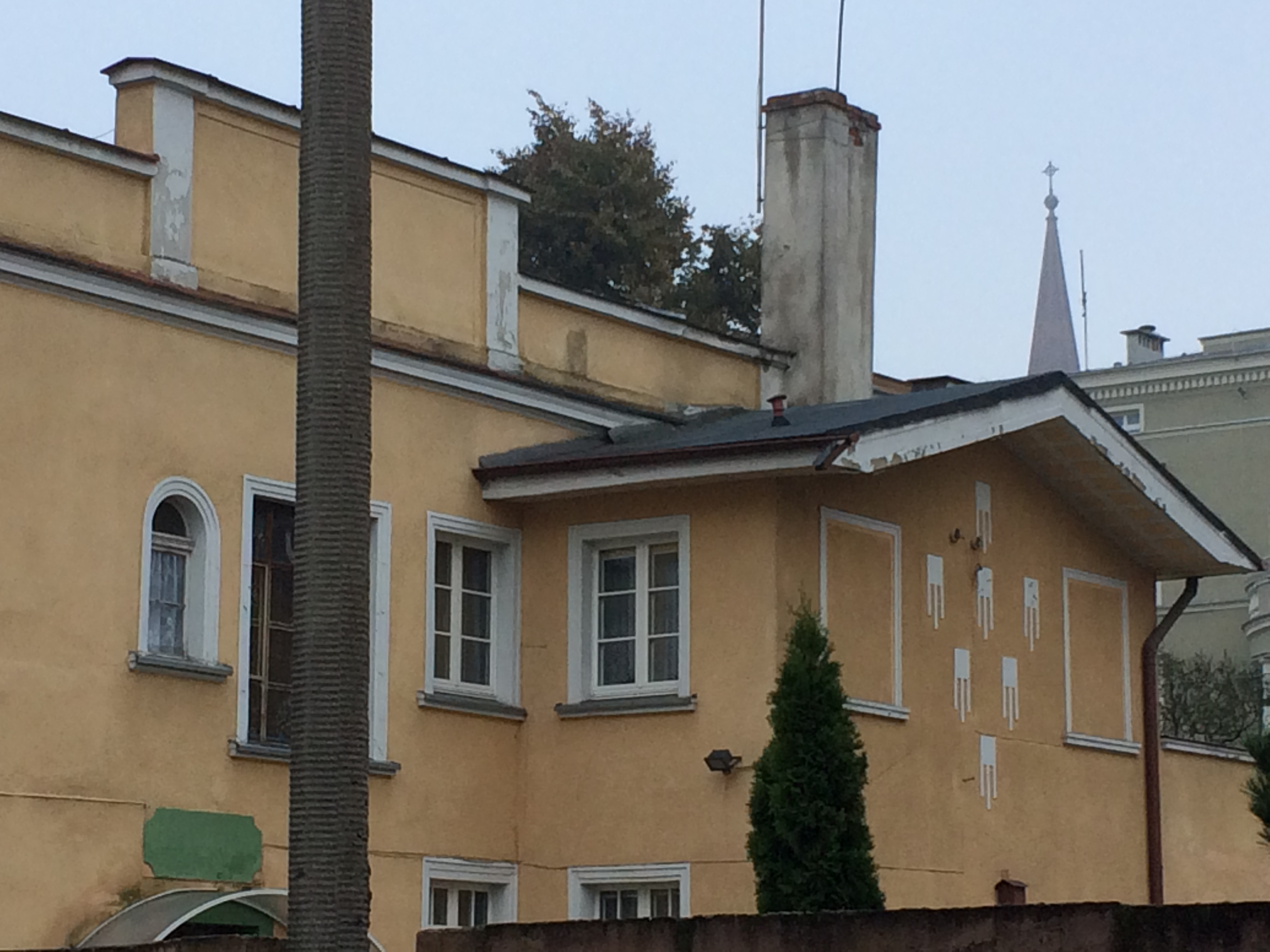
Detail

=== Tenement at 4 ===
1869

Art Nouveau

Initial address was Gräfe straße 6. Karoline Witt, a widow, is reported as landlord in 1869. In 1883, Wilhelm Kriente, a paymaster, became the new owner; his family lived there until 1920.

The tenement shows Art Nouveau elements, though many motifs disappeared with time. One can underline the two bay windows, topped by eyelid dormers, and the still preserved portal of the main entry adorned by pilasters, transom light and floral ornaments.

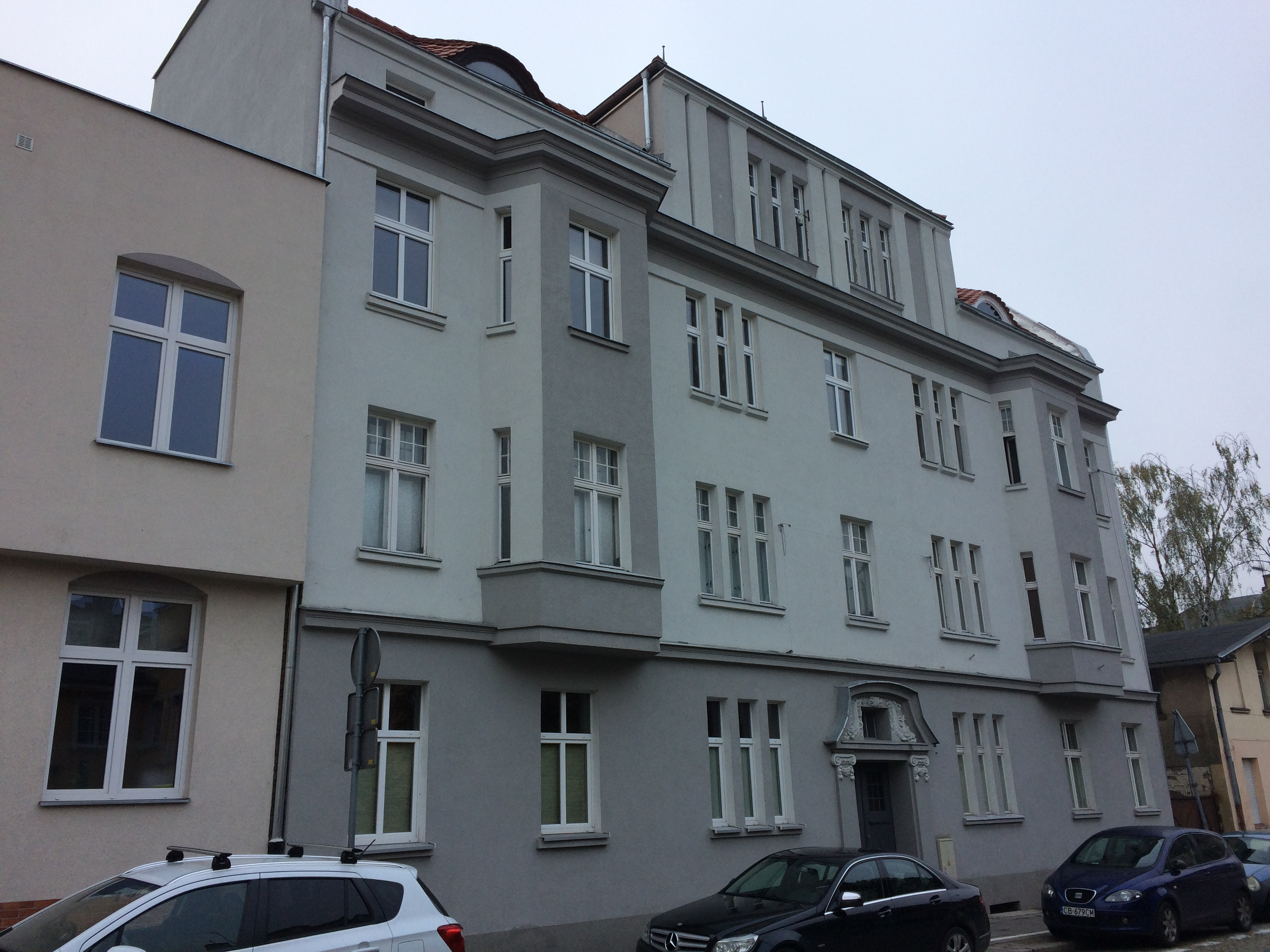
Main elevation on the street

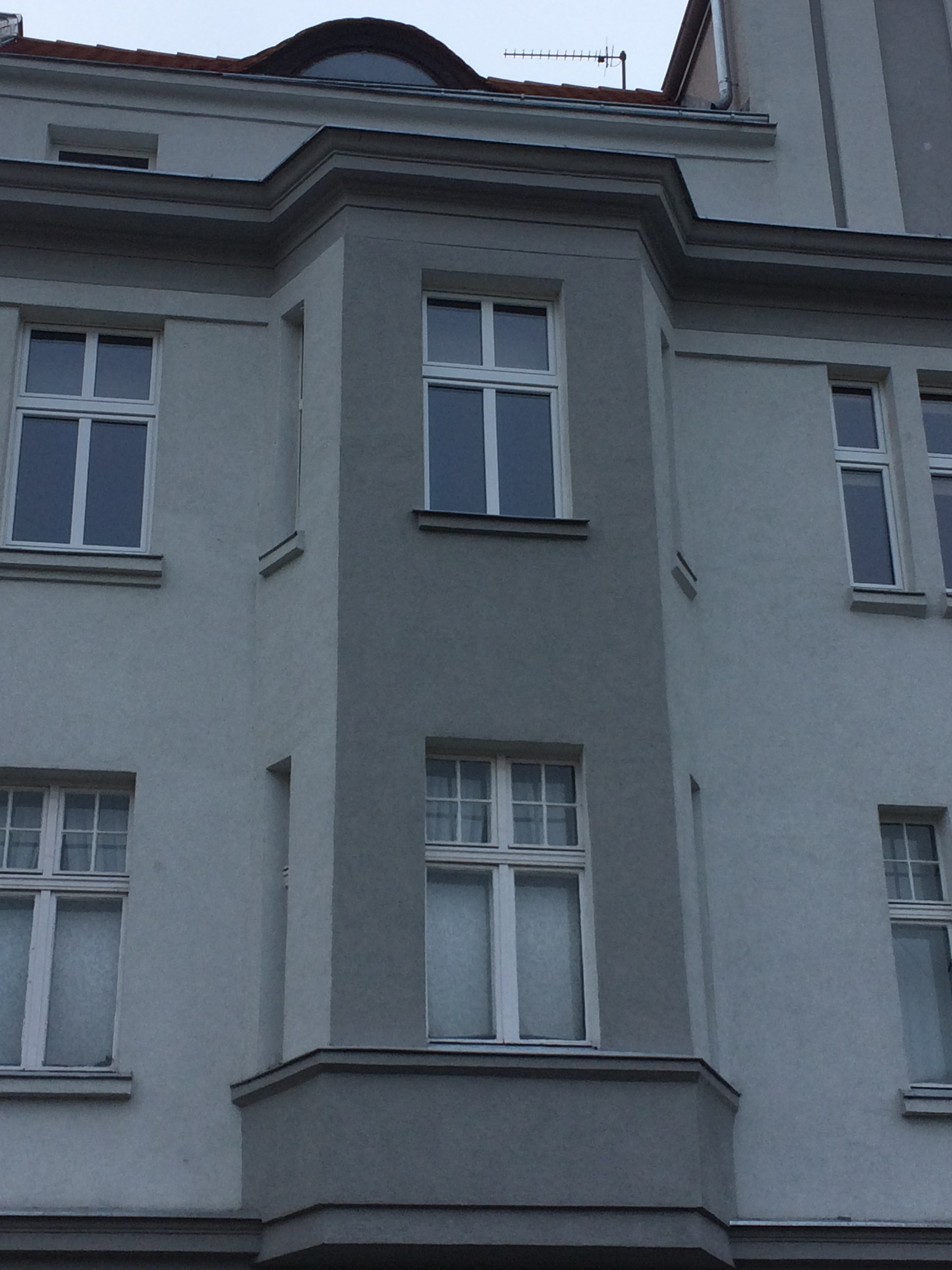
Bay window detail

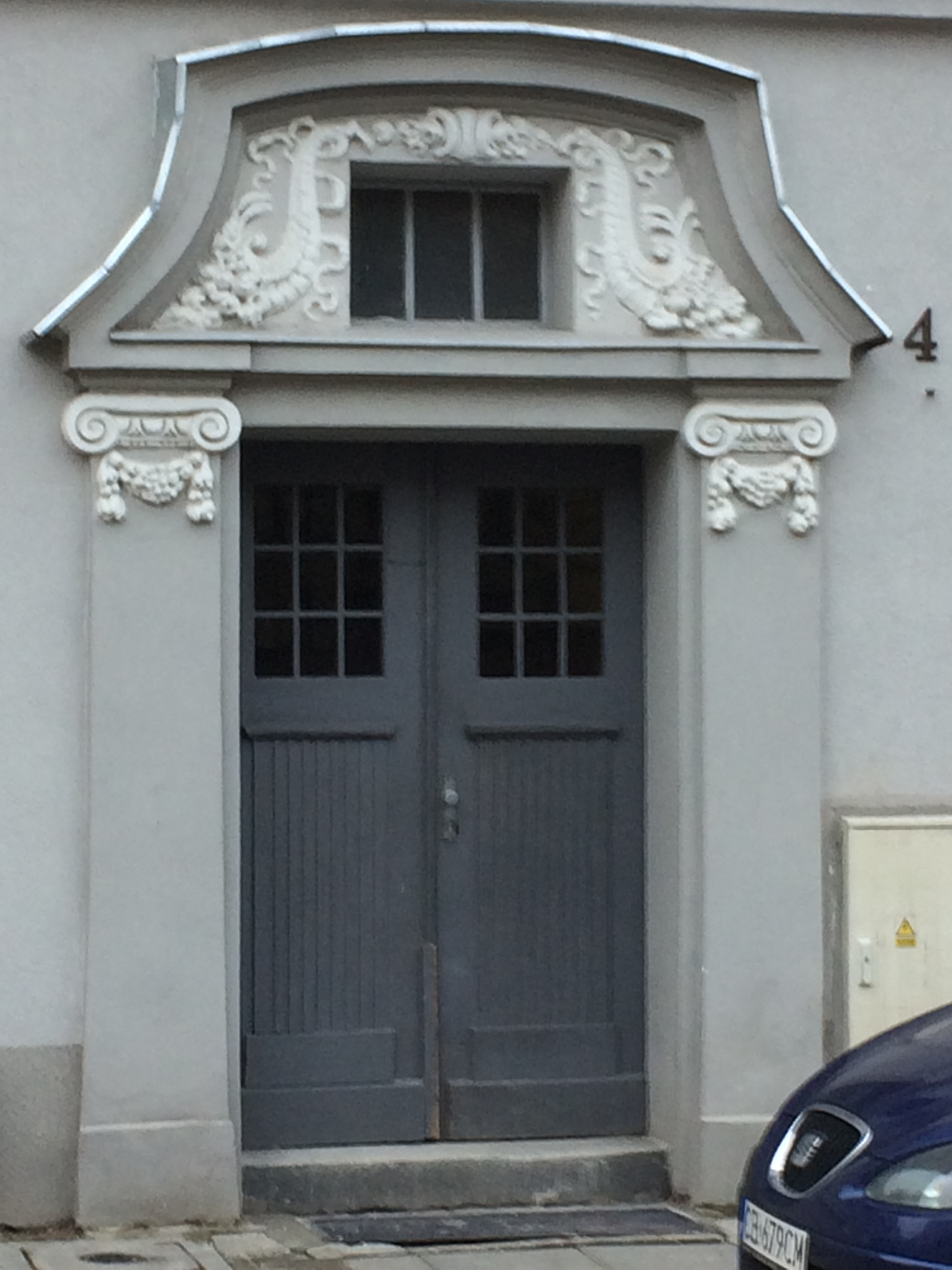
Portal detail

=== Tenement at 5 ===
1875-1900

Neoclassical architecture

The tenement at then Gräfe straße 3 was first the property of M. Czarnecki, a rentier, who never lived there.

The facade of the building displays typical neo-classical features: simple symmetrical windows, pilasters, pediment and architraves.

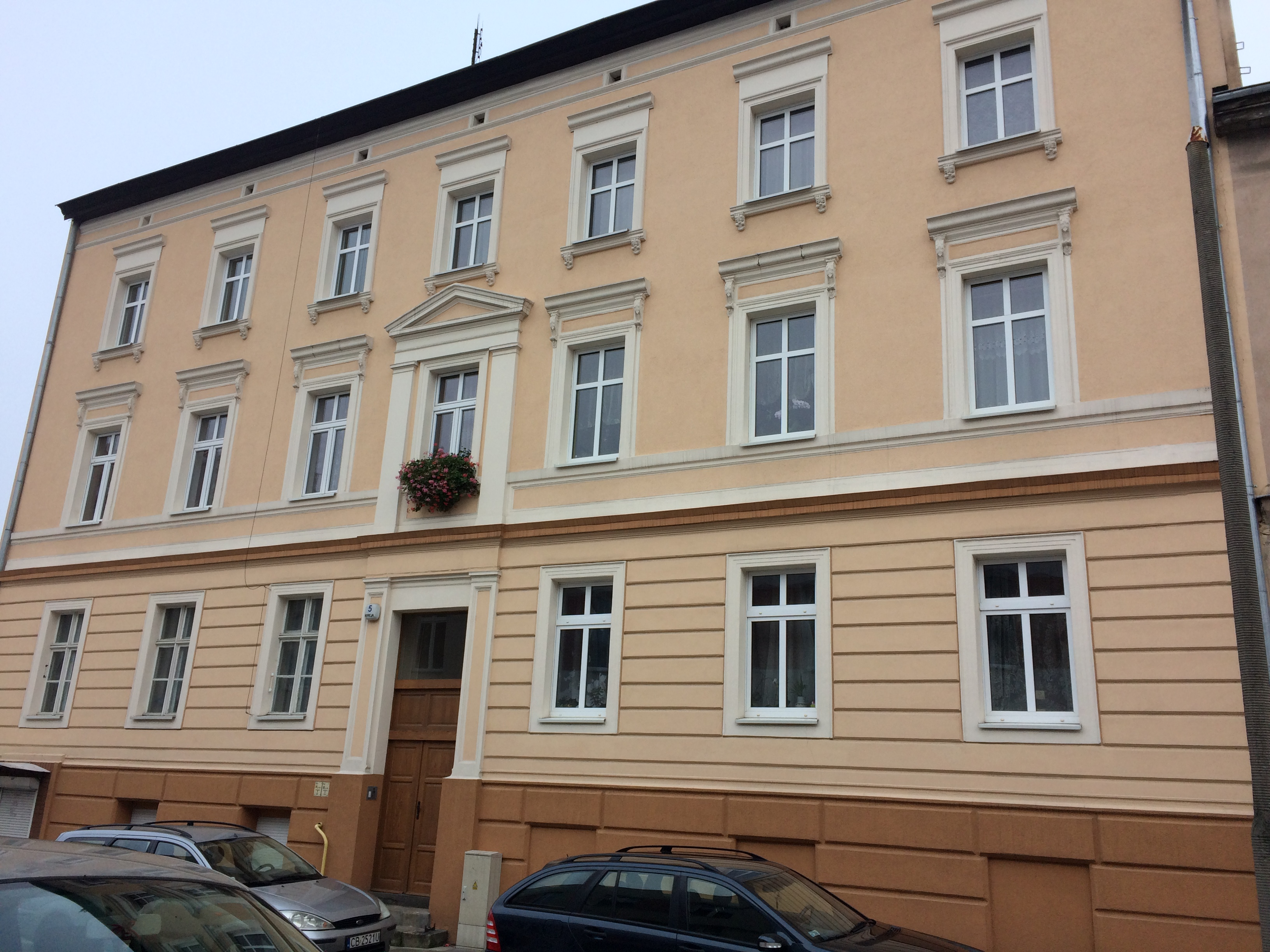
Main elevation on the street

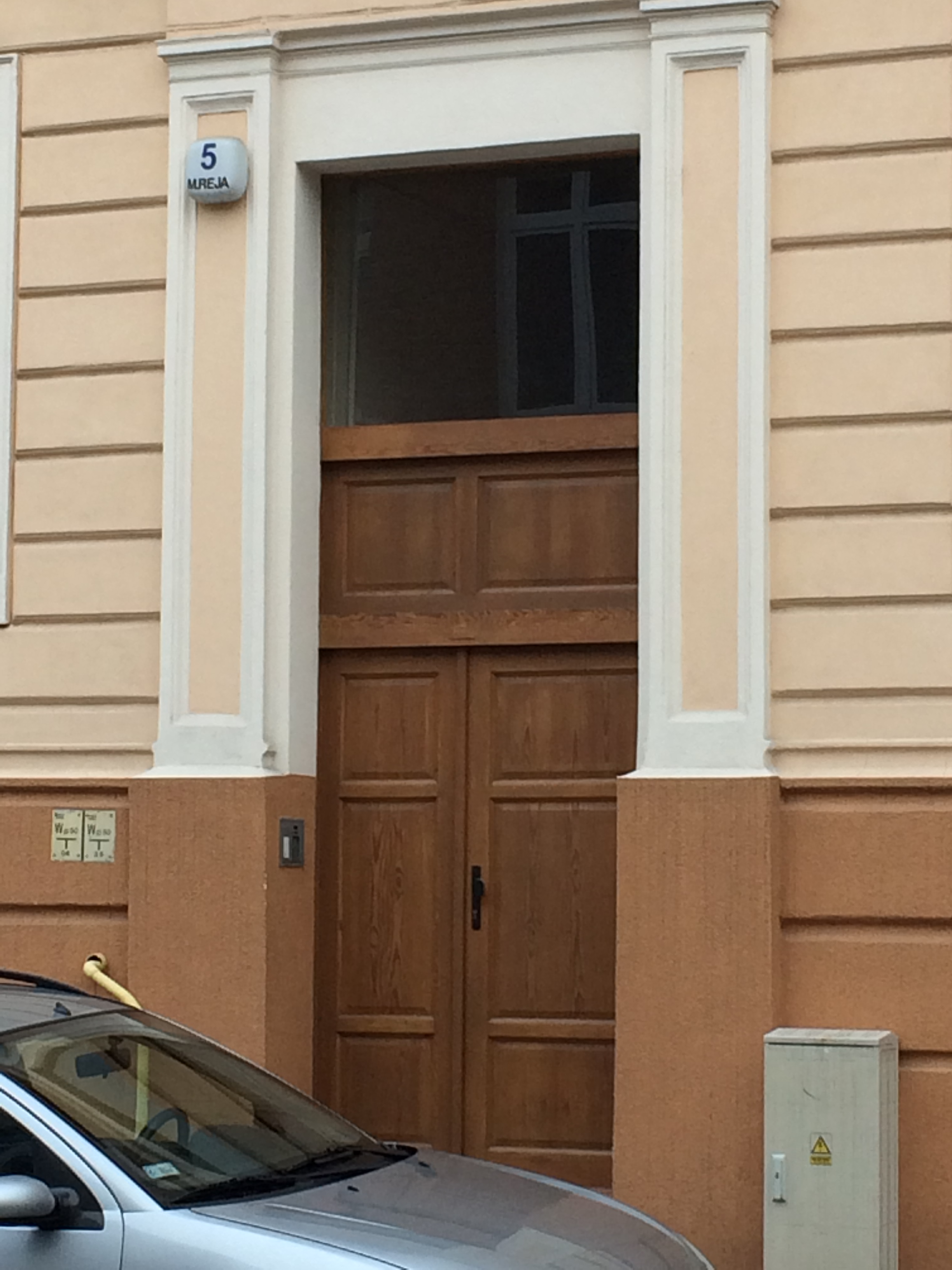
Gate

=== Tenement at 7 ===
1876, 1897

Eclecticism

The tenement was initially an educational Centre for deaf children. The first project for deaf children in Bydgoszcz dates back to 1868, when the vice president of the Province of Posen, Karl von Horn, looked to set up such an institution in Bromberg region. First location identified was the Evangelical teacher seminar: it was established in 1871, and provided initially only education, while pupils were living in families.

In 1876, at then Gräfe straße 5, was built a new school, where students could live as in a boarding school, in the premises. The edifice stood next to the L. Braille special educational centre for blind children. From 1890 to 1900, it has been called Provincial Institute for the Deaf (German: Provinzial Taubstummen Anstall zu Bromberg), covering the area of the Province of Posen. In 1911, its names changed to National Institute for the Deaf. In 1922, two years after takeover by the Polish authorities, the school was transferred to Kościan.

The building footprint is L-shaped. Main edifice dates back to 1897: the part giving onto Reja street housed the dormitory. The three-storey wing onto Krasiński Street has been erected in the 1880s. The front elevation presents a small bay window. The school participated to the construction of a brick gym hall (German: Turnhalle), at the corner of streets Krasiński Street and Gimnazjalna in 1896. Today the tenement serves as a residential area. It still boasts -despite a partial rebuilding after 1945- some preserved original woodwork on windows and doors.

The low wall on the street displays a mural painting, Czas (Time) realized by local artists, Bezt, Sainer, Pain, Pener, and Autone. This work is part of an ensemble of more than 50 pieces scattered within Bydgoszcz.

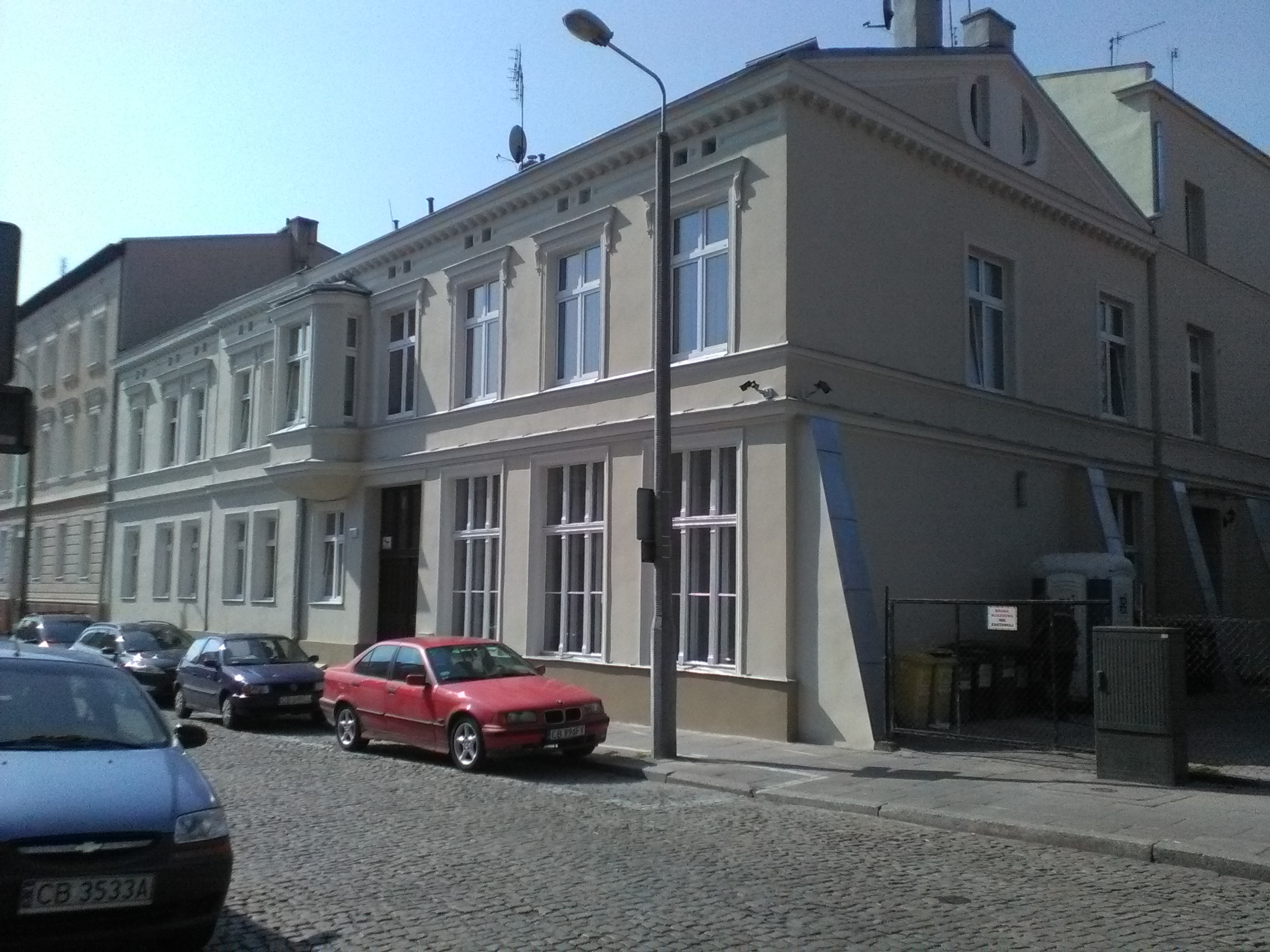
Main frontage

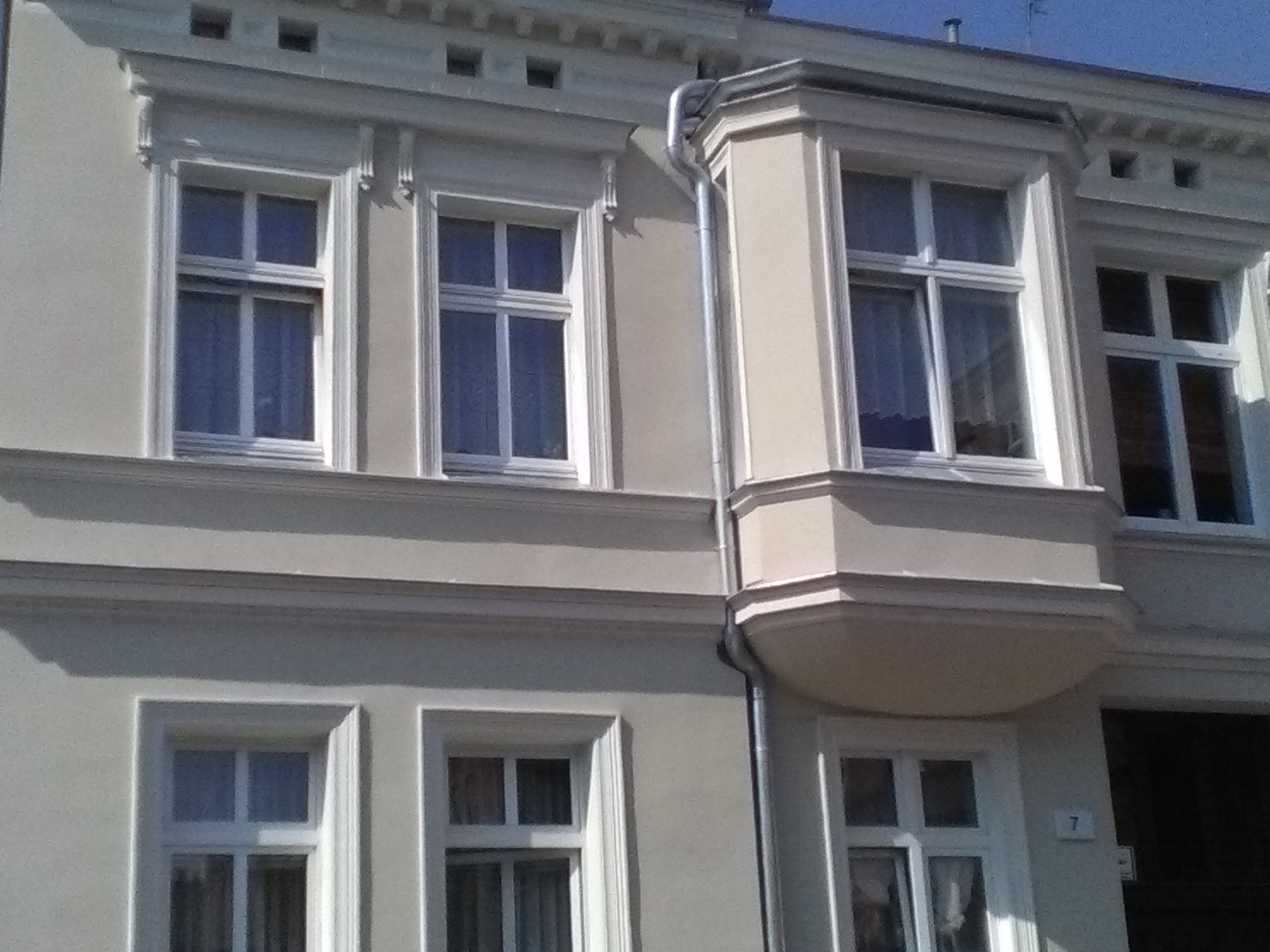
Bay window

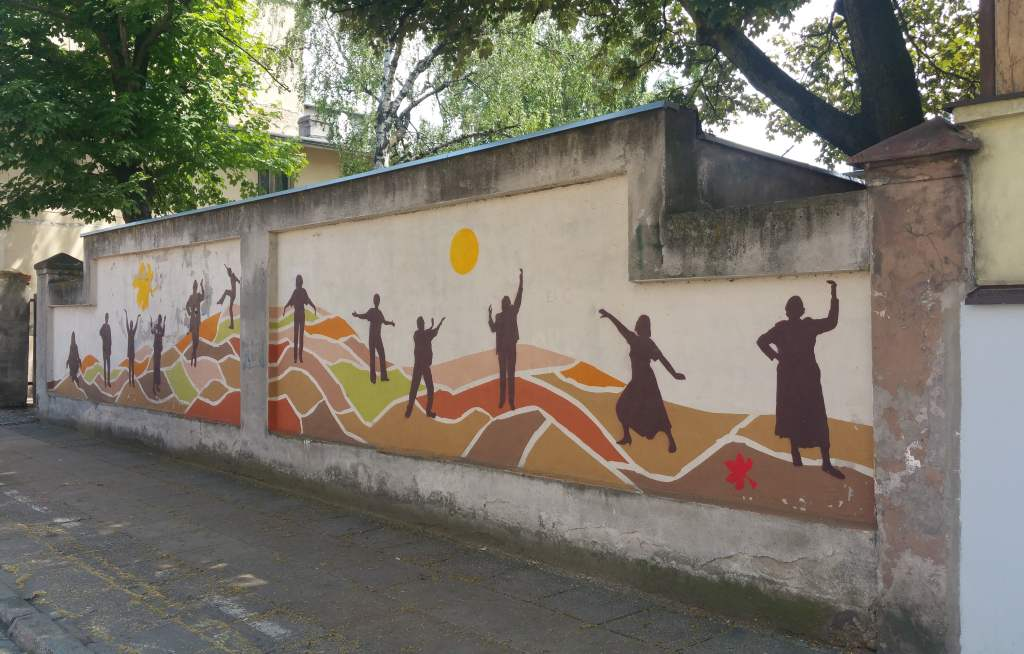
Mural

=== L. Braille special educational centre for blind children, corner with 10 Zygmunt Krasiński Street ===
1872, Fritz Müller

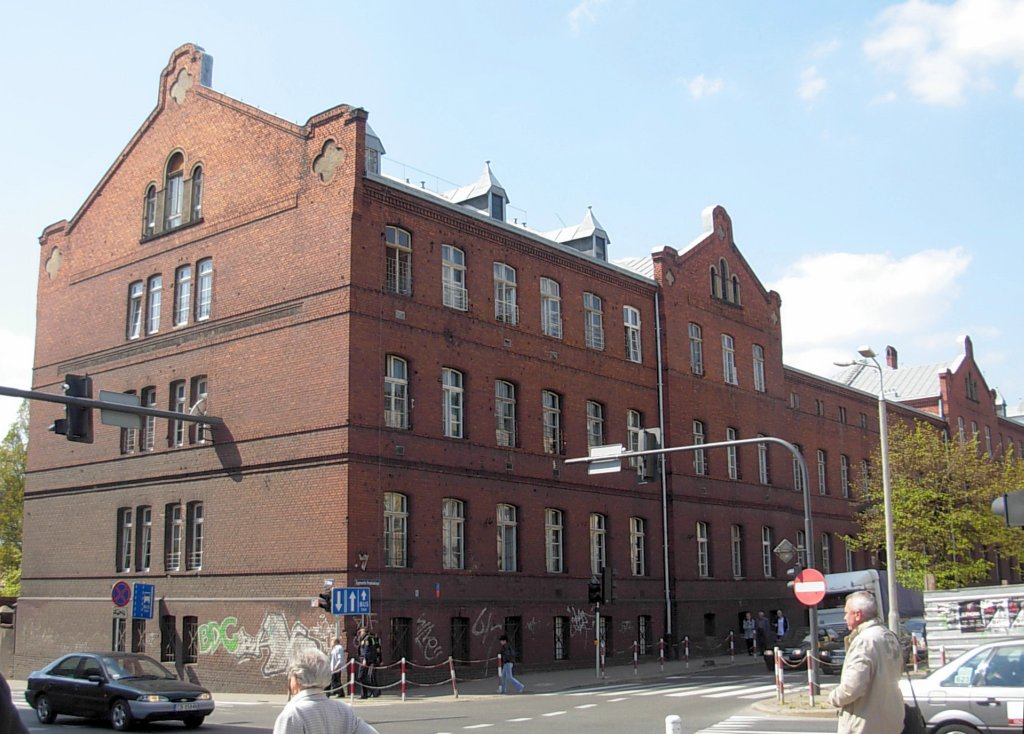
View from the street

== See also ==
- Bydgoszcz
- Bydgoszcz Architects (1850-1970s)
- L. Braille special educational centre for blind children in Bydgoszcz

== Bibliography ==
- (in Polish) Denisuk, Andrzej (1990). Z działalności Towarzystwa Muzycznego w Bydgoszczy. Kronika Bydgoska X. Bydgoszcz: Towarzystwo Miłosnikow Miasta Bydgoszczy - Bydgoskie Towarzystwo Naukowe. pp. 205–216.
- (in Polish) Umiński, Janusz (1996). Bydgoszcz Przewodnik. Bydgoszcz: Regionalny Oddział PTTK "Szlak Brdy".
- (in Polish) Pruss Zdzisław, Weber Alicja, Kuczma Rajmund (2004). Bydgoski leksykon muzyczny. Bydgoszcz: Kujawsko-Pomorskie Towarzystwo Kulturalne.
- (in Polish) Przecherko, Tadeusz (2003). Osiemdziesiąt lat minęło. Kalendarz Bydgoski. Bydgoszcz: Towarzystwo Miłośników Miasta Bydgoszczy.
- (in Polish) Janiszewska-Mincer, Barbara (1996). Pierwszy ośrodek dla Głuchoniemych w Bydgoszczy. Kalendarz Bydgoski. Bydgoszcz: Towarzystwo Miłośników Miasta Bydgoszczy.
- (in Polish) Umiński, Janusz (2004). Tradycja szkolnictwa dla głuchych. Kalendarz Bydgoski. Bydgoszcz: Towarzystwo Miłośników Miasta Bydgoszczy.
