= A Polish Nobleman =

1637 painting by Rembrandt

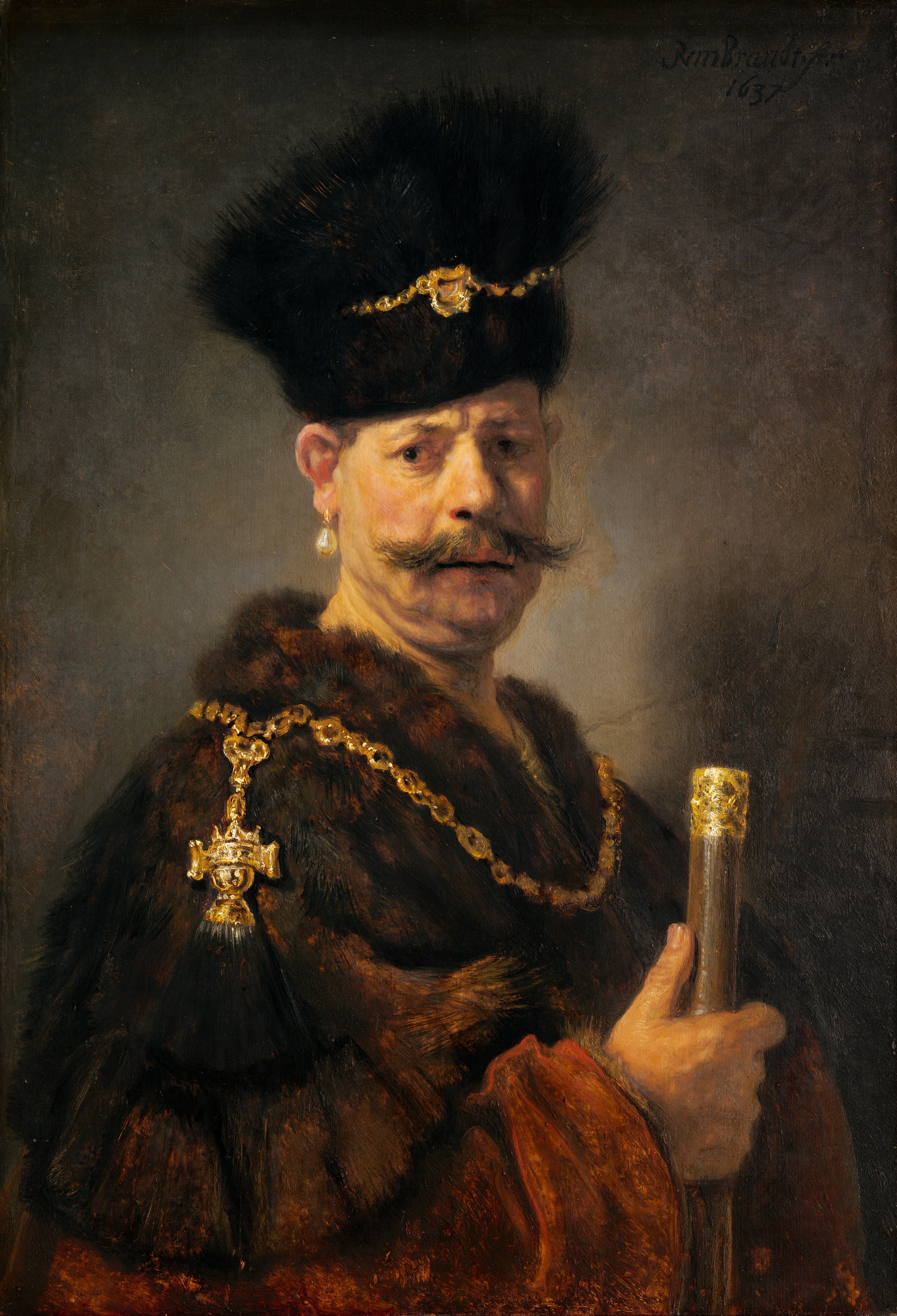
- Artist: Rembrandt
- Year: 1637
- Medium: Oil on panel
- Dimensions: 96.7 cm × 66.1 cm (38.1 in × 26.0 in)
- Location: National Gallery of Art, Washington, D.C.

A Polish Nobleman is a 1637 painting by Rembrandt depicting a man in a costume of Polish szlachta (nobility). The identity of the subject of the painting is unclear, and has given rise to several different interpretations. The view that the figure's dress is clearly Polish is not universally held and it may have been a self-portrait.

The painting has changed owners several times, and its past owners have included Catherine II the Great and Andrew Mellon. It is now in the National Gallery of Art in Washington, D.C.

== Description ==
The portrait represents a man, estimated by some to be 45 years of age, standing turned to the viewer's right, looking at the viewer with a commanding expression. In his uplifted right hand he holds a baton with a golden cap. He has a thick moustache and wears a high fur cap on which there is a golden chain with precious stones and a coat of arms in the center. From his ear a large pear-shaped pearl hangs from a golden pendant earring. He wears a reddish-brown mantle with a broad fur collar and, over it, a heavy gold chain from which the order of three horse tails, set in rich pendants, hangs on his right shoulder. A full light from the left falls on the right side of his face. The background is brownish-grey.

== History and provenance ==
The painting was created by Rembrandt in 1637. It was not given an official title. The current one is the most recent, widely accepted one. Prior and alternate names include Portrait of a Slav Prince, Portrait d'un Turc, and Man in Russian Costume. Its authenticity was supported by an analysis of the panel's oak wood, which showed that it was cut from a tree felled around 1635 that was also used in the painter's River Landscape with Ruins (1650). The painting underwent restoration in 1985 and has been X-rayed.

The painting's first owner or owners are not clear, but it might have been owned by a certain Harman van Swole. It was part of the extensive collection of Johann Karl Philipp von Cobenzl, a Carniolan nobleman who served as Maria Theresa's plenipotentiary in the Austrian Netherlands. After Cobenzl's bankruptcy, it was purchased in 1768 by Catherine II the Great and held in the Hermitage Museum in Saint Petersburg. It was purchased by Andrew Mellon in 1931, and given by the Mellon Trust to the National Gallery of Art in Washington, D.C., in 1937. The painting was one of 21 artworks that Mellon had purchased from the Hermitage during the 1930s.

He denied having made these purchases until 1935, since the US was in a major depression – which would have made the acquisitions seem extravagant – and at odds with the Soviet government. The works were kept for some time in a non-public section of the Corcoran Gallery of Art in Washington, D.C.

== Analysis ==
This work was labeled by some art critics as a tronie, a painting with an exaggerated facial expression or a stock character in costume. For instance, Melissa Percival notes that in this particular painting the viewer may notice an extravagant fur cape, lopsided hat, tufted mustache, and similar paraphernalia, all giving "an impression that the painting should not be taken too seriously".

Scholars have attempted for more than a century to understand who is portrayed in this painting. Earlier proposals that the subject was John III Sobieski (who would have been eight years old in 1637) or Stephen Bathory (who died in 1586) have been discredited. According to Otakar Odložilík, while the man in the painting is clearly wearing Polish garb, it is neither certain who he is, nor whether he is a Pole. Odložilík's research on this issue suggested that the painting may be that of Andrzej Rej, a Polish noble and diplomat of that era who passed through Amsterdam, the Netherlands, where Rembrandt was working, at the time the painting was created. Nonetheless, without any documents from that era clearly acknowledging that fact, as Odložilík noted, it may never be known for certain who the subject really is.

Odložilík concluded (writing in 1963) that most scholars are in consensus that Rembrandt portrayed a real Polish noble. He cited research by Kurt Bauch who has suggested that it may be Rembrandt's brother Adriaen who modeled for him, but judged it as unlikely. Other views have emerged since the publication of his article. In 1979 the art historian Kenneth Clark opined that it was a self-portrait, idealized and "got up in fancy dress". Walter Liedtke of the Metropolitan Museum of Art writing in 2001 identifies the hat as Russian and Marieke de Winkel in 2006 asserted that "...the man cannot be identified as a Pole but as a Muscovite boyar." The National Gallery website states that it is "probably not a portrait of a specific individual", but notes a strong resemblance to Rembrandt himself and suggests in turn that it may be a self-portrait. One objection to its classification as a self-portrait, that the subject's jowls were too pronounced, was addressed by an X-ray analysis showing that Rembrandt modified the painting during the course of its creation.

Marcin Łątka argues in his blog Art in Poland that the painting depicts Jan Stanisław Jabłonowski (1600–1647) who was Marshal of the extraordinary Sejm of 1637. Marshals used a rod like the one in the picture to keep order. There are no pictures of Jan Stanisław Jabłonowski but there are images of his son Stanisław Jan Jabłonowski that show a good resemblance to the man in the painting.

== See also ==
- List of paintings by Rembrandt
- The Polish Rider (another Poland-themed painting by Rembrandt)
- Self-portraits by Rembrandt
