= Rej =

Rej, rej, or REJ can refer to:

- Rejang language, Austronesian language spoken in Sumatra, Indonesia
- Rej EP, extended play by German house and techno band Âme
- Rej (name), masculine given name and surname
- Revue des Études Juives, French quarterly academic journal of Jewish studies
