= L. Braille Special Educational Centre for Blind Children, Bydgoszcz =

School for the blind in Poland

L. Braille special educational centre for blind children in Bydgoszcz
- Polish: SOSW Nr.1 w Bydgoszczy
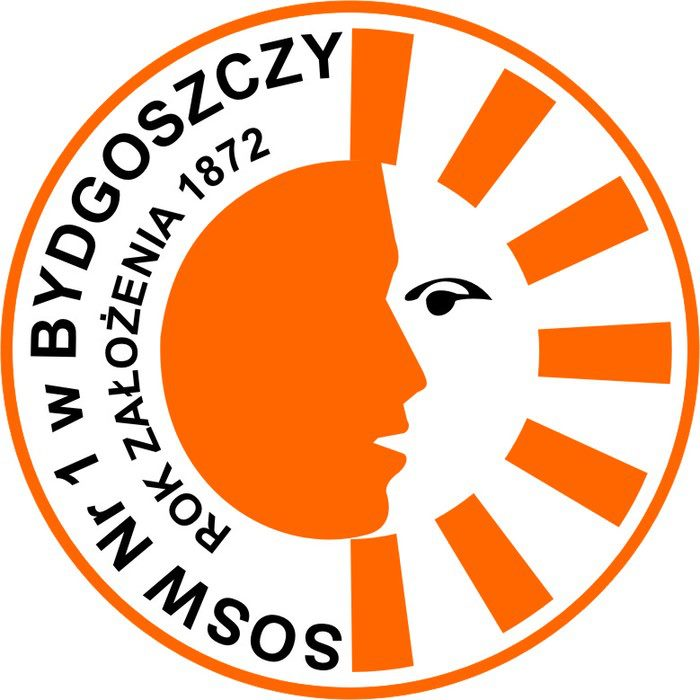

Location
- Krasiński Street 10, Bydgoszcz; Poland
- Coordinates: 53°7′37″N 18°00′34″E

Information
- Opened: 1872
- Principal: Małgorzata Szczepanek
- Age: 6 to 24
- Enrollment: 380

L. Braille Special educational centre for blind children (Polish: Kujawsko-Pomorski Specjalny Ośrodek Szkolno-Wychowawczy Nr 1 dla Dzieci I Młodzieży Słabo Widzącej I Niewidomej im. Louisa Braille'a w Bydgoszczy) is a specialized educational institution located at Krasinski street 10 in Bydgoszcz, Poland.

== Location ==
The centre seats in a 19th-century old brick building, in downtown district, between Krasinski, 3 Maja and Mikołaj Rej streets.

== History ==
=== Prussian period ===
The first Department for Blind Children initially opened in Wolsztyn on 6 July 1853. It was created on the initiative of a local pharmacist and philanthropist named Józef Knechtel. In 1865, his institution passed under the direct administration of the Province of Posen government.

In 1865, a commission proposed the Parliament of Prussia the construction in Bydgoszcz of an establishment able to receive forty blind children of both sexes, regardless of their religion. The rationale for this was the possibility of sponsoring the institution to-be with the local teachers Seminar, Bernardyńska Street in Bydgoszcz#Building at N.C2.B06, which opened in Bromberg in 1820 and moved to 6 Bernardyńska Street in 1825. The proposal was adopted by the Parliament on 2 October 1868. The magistrate of Bydgoszcz donated a 2.13 acres plot for the construction of the institution and the Sejm of the Grand Duchy of Poznan allocated funded 28000 crowns between 1864 and 1870 to fund the construction. The same year, a first class moved from Wolsztyn to Bydgoszcz.

The first director of Bydgoszcz specialized school was Albert Kienel, an experienced educator who had been working for 20 years in Wolsztyn. The first 24 pupils arrived on 4 May 1872. In the early 20th century, a majority of the students were Polish children.

From the start, the center quickly became a mainstay of life for blind people following the Prussian annexation. Pupils came most from areas Pomerania, Greater Poland and Silesia. After a six years curriculum in the elementary school, students could obtain qualifications as organist, craftsman, or tuner for musical instruments. In 1886, the first organist was qualified, in 1902, the first artisan and in 1906 the first masseuse (a pioneering area for such a school). During the time when Anton Wittig was director (since 1882), an hostel for blind was founded where pupils were employed: it still stands at 9 Kołłątaj street.

From 1906 to 1909 new buildings were added: two wings on the sides and an extension in the backyard that allowed the creation of new classrooms, workshop areas and an apartment for the director. In addition, the auditorium was renovated, the building connected to city networks (water, gas, heating, telephone), and an elevator set in the kitchen.

=== Interwar period ===
Polish authorities took over the place on 1 April 1920. The facility received the name National Institute for the Blind, then to Provincial Department for the Blind (16 January 1928), and eventually to Pomeranian Department for Blind - Communal Association in Bydgoszcz (Polish: Zakład Ociemniałych Pomorskiego Wojewódzkiego Związku Komunalnego w Bydgoszczy) on 1 April 1938.

The first director of the new Polish institution was Bronisław Hausner, followed in 1926 by Józef Mencel which served till September 1939.

After 1921, the school welcomed children from the northern and western regions of the country. The number of pupils varied, from: 30 boys and 29 girls in 1920–1921 to 77 boys and 46 girls in 1929–1930. In addition to the 7-year elementary school cycle, children were taught the professional skills (weaving, knitting, piano tuning), and the smartest ones were educated as musicians, mainly organists.

In 1930, in the establishment was created Poland's first school department for visually impaired children.

=== World War II years ===
After the occupation of Bydgoszcz by the Nazi armed forces during World War II, the institute was closed. On 26 October 1939 the building housed a school for the deaf. The expansion of the war to the East, forced the authorities to liquidate it. From 1943, German citizens from Hamburg lived in the premises, as a result of the bombing of the city by the allies. At the end of the war, the edifice housed a German military hospital.

=== Post war period ===
Early after the war, the place housed several different municipal and governmental institutions. In July 1947, however, the department of Education took over the building to dedicate it to the Centre of Educational Training for Authorities (Polish: Ośrodek Doskonalenia Władz Oświatowych). Eventually, thanks to the lobbying efforts of Wladyslaw Winnicki to drawing attention to the need for training blind people, the building returned to its original function.

Re-opening took place on 16 October 1948. It was named Educational Institution for Blind Children in Bydgoszcz and had a primary school, a secondary public vocational school and a dormitory. In 1949, it was taken for management by the Board of Bydgoszcz School District and nationalized. In 1967, it changed its name to Education Centre in Bydgoszcz (Polish: Ośrodek Szkolno-Wychowawczy w Bydgoszczy).

In the school year 1972–73, the number of pupils climbed up to 183, with 77 staff personnel.

In 1972, for the 10th anniversary of the establishment in Bydgoszcz, it has been the name of Louis Braille, founder of Braille handwriting. George Kuberski, the Polish Minister for Education a bust and a plaque celebrating this christening. The same year, the Vocational Secondary School opened. In 1977, new professions curriculums were created such as locksmith workshop or mechanical machining.

In 1982, the institution was renamed Louis Braille Special Education Centre, one among seven others of this kind in Poland, and welcomed 164 pupils. Through the 1970s and 1980s, the institution provided apprenticeships and jobs for graduates in identified firms like cooperatives in Bydgoszcz and Gdańsk and Regional Transport Company. The school also had a variety of cooperation with companies: ZNTK, Romet, BKBD, Befana and others.

=== Current data ===
Since 2009, the center chairs the association Visus Supremus which goal is to lead diagnostic and support for education and rehabilitation of blind and visually impaired.

In 2015, the center included the following curriculum:

- Early support development for a small child (WWRD);
- primary school;
- junior high school;
- secondary school;
- Technical massage;
- Basic vocational school (electromechanics, mechanics machinery, cooking and support for hotel staff operations);
- School job training;
- Post-secondary school (technicians and administrative technicians);
- Qualifying vocational courses for adults (gastronomy administration);
- Country's first branch for deaf and blind children;

The majority of high school graduates take further education at colleges and post-secondary schools. From 19 January 1999 the establishment is associated with the UNESCO, as a specialized institution.

== Architecture ==
The main building has an "E" shape, with small wings supported at the corners by prominent buttresses. Avant-corps are topped with triangular gables and adorned with plastered panels. Brick facades are divided by broad timber-framing structures. In 2015, renovation works inside the building near the entry gate unveiled a 19th-century frieze.

The central building has two floors: the second and part of the first welcomes children dormitory. Offices are located on the first floor: doctor's, nurse's and ophthalmologist's, working areas (experience, historical study, auditorium), and the division for deafblind children. The ground floor houses classrooms, canteen, director's and deputy director's offices, head of the dormitory, therapist, psychologist, school counselor, teachers' room and school secretariat. In the close vicinity, a workshop pavilion and a junior high school have been built in the 1974–1975. On September 3, 2012, a new three-storey educational pavilion, housing 26 teaching rooms and studio workshop has opened, the day of the 140th anniversary of the institution. Outside are two playgrounds for children, pupils and students. Near the facility stands a gym hall, that has been renovated in 2015.

== Gallery ==
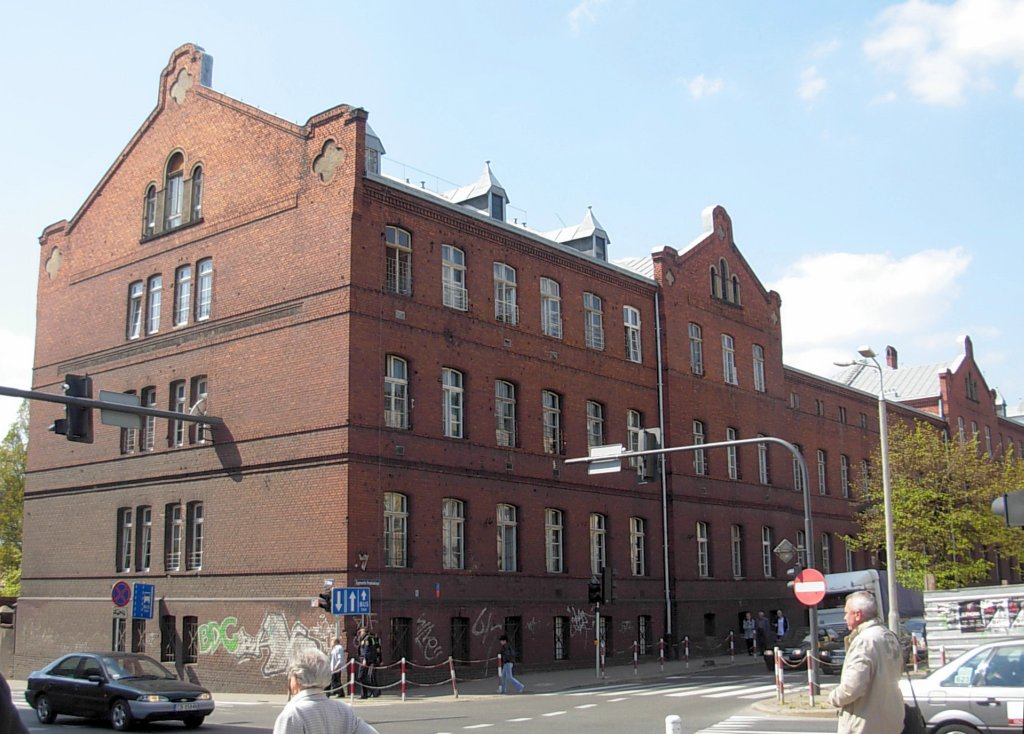
Main building from May 3rd street

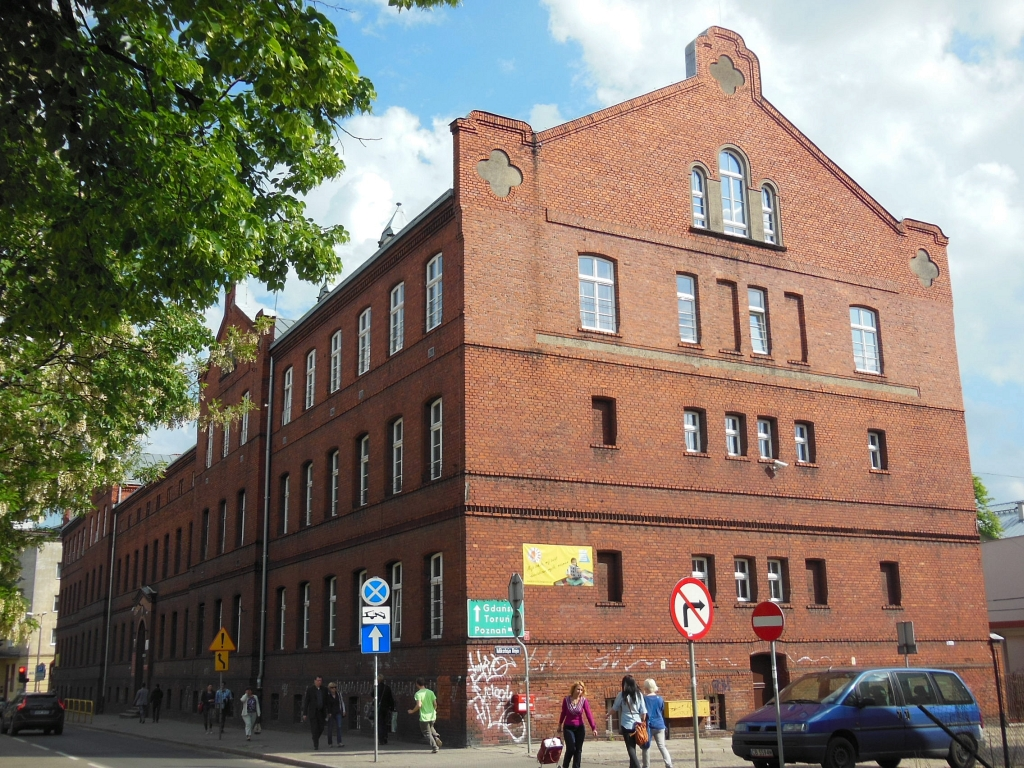
Main building from Krasiński Street

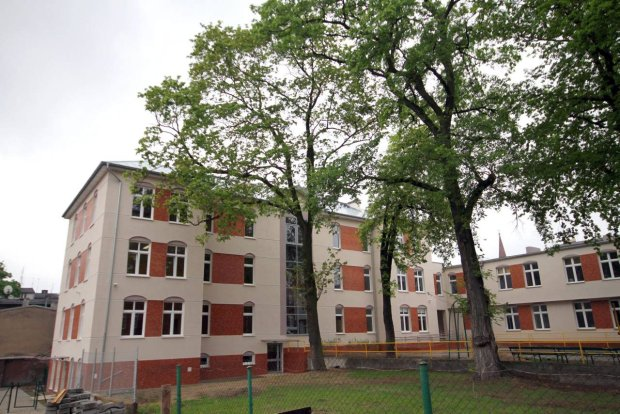
Recent buildings in the backyard

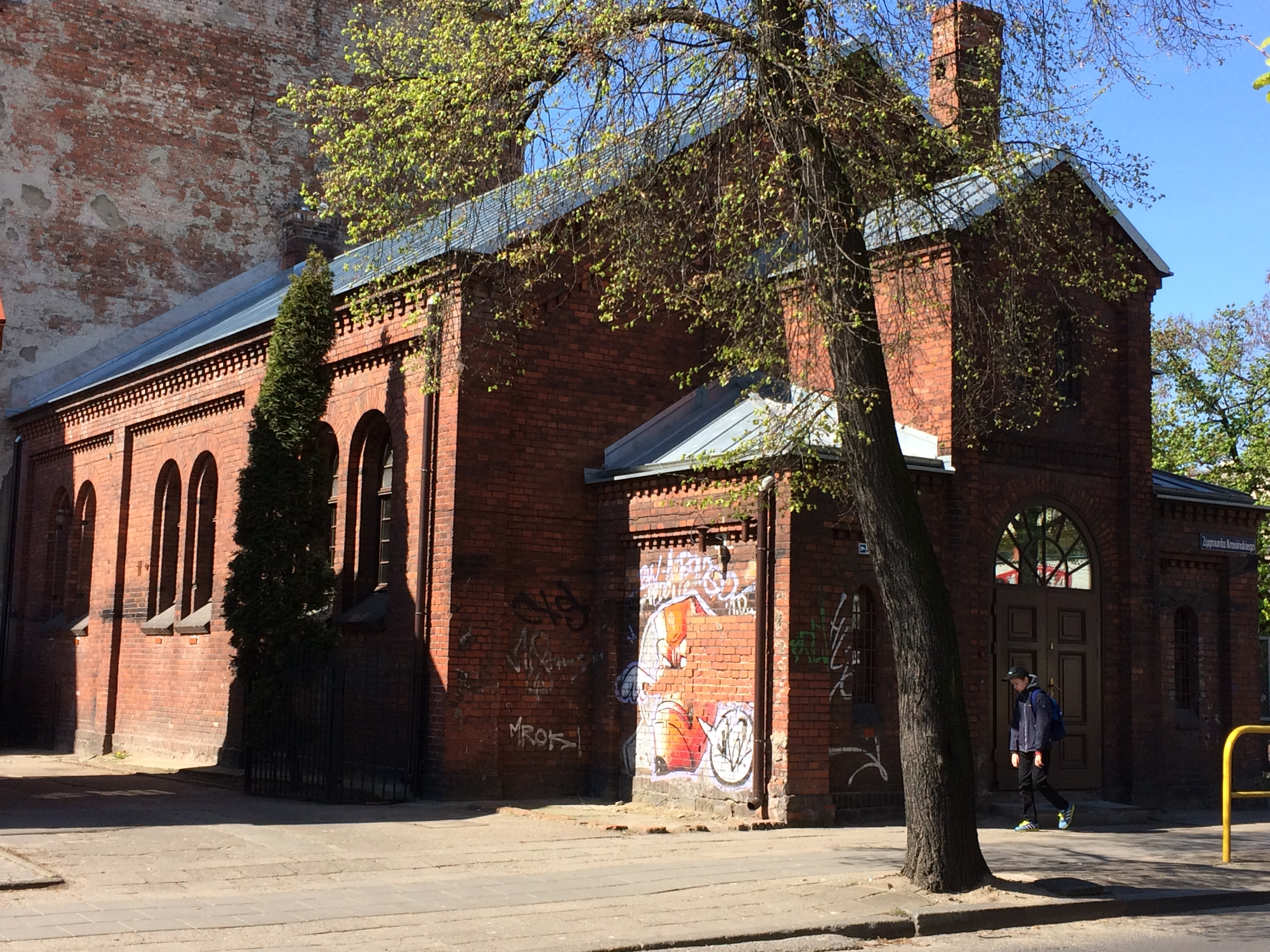
Gym hall building viewed from the Krasiński Street

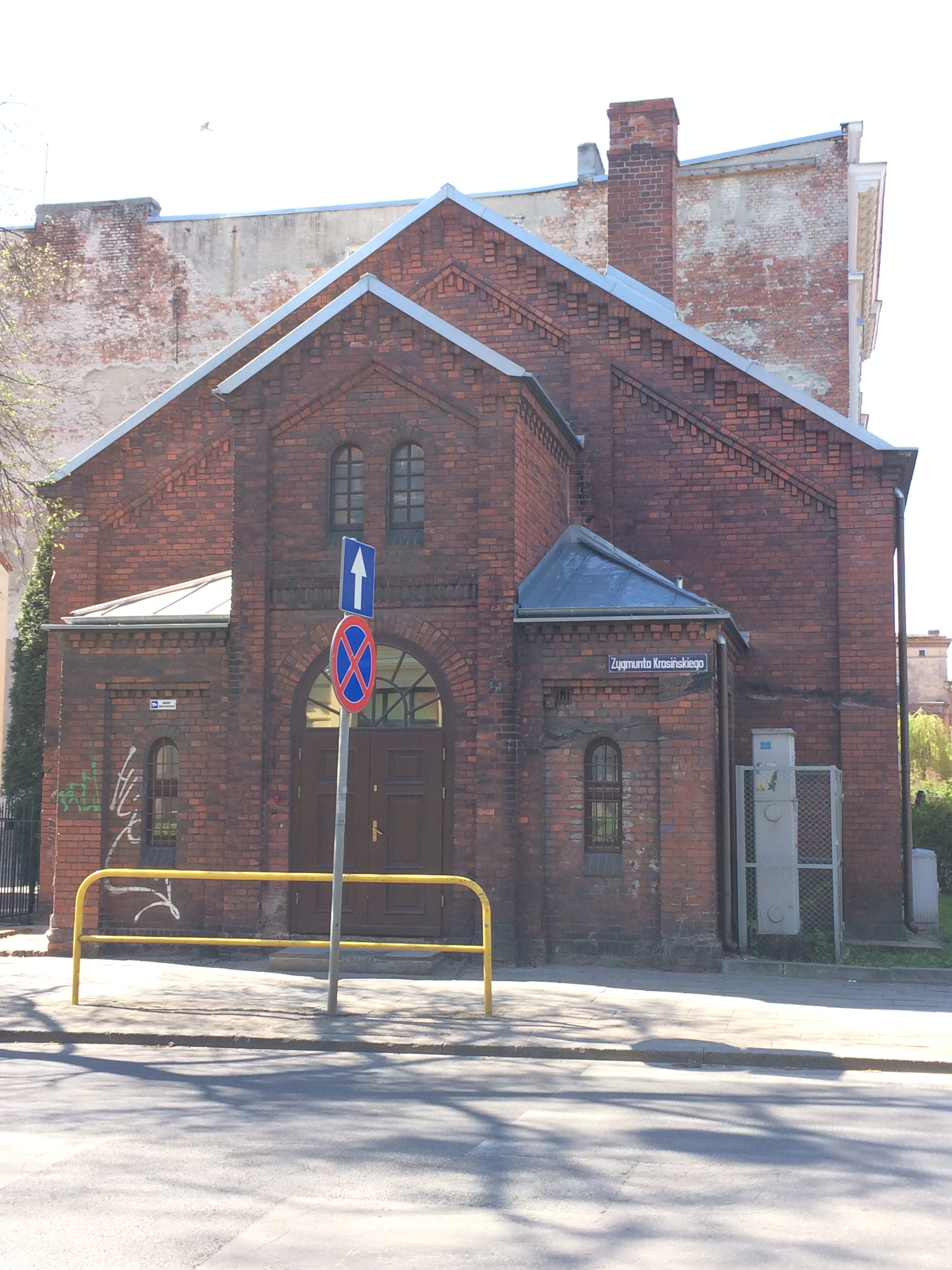
Gym Hall Main entry

== See also ==
- Bydgoszcz
- Zygmunt Krasiński Street in Bydgoszcz
- High School No. 1, Bydgoszcz
- Freedom Square, Bydgoszcz

== Bibliography ==
- (in Polish) Krzysztof Bartowski - Historia szkoły Braillem pisana - Kalendarz Bydgoski 1984
- (in Polish) Ewa Grzybowska - Ich drugi dom - Kronika Bydgoska VI 1974–1975
- (in Polish) Henryk Kulpiński - Sto lat w służbie niewidomych - Kalendarz Bydgoski 1975
- (in Polish) Dorota Okońska & Natasza Karpińska - Szkoła brajlem pisana - Kalendarz Bydgoski 2009
