= Otakar Odložilík =

Czech historian and archivist

Otakar Odložilík (12 January 1899 – 14 July 1973) was a Czech historian and archivist. He wrote numerous books and papers on the history of Protestantism in Bohemia and Moravia.

== Life ==
Otakar Odložilík was born on 12 January 1899 in Kostelec u Holešova, Moravia, Austria-Hungary. From 1949, he lived and worked in the United States, but he went to his native region for visits. He suddenly died on 14 July 1973, when he was visiting Yugoslavia. His ashes were buried in Whitemarsh Township, Pennsylvania.

== Work ==
His scholarly interests included the history of the Hussite movement and the Unity of the Brethren, and he published studies of Jan Milíč, Andrzej Rej and the history of Charles University in Prague.

He wrote the article on the history of Bohemia and Czechoslovakia for the 1974 edition of the Encyclopædia Britannica. Following World War II, he spent most of his life as a professor in the United States and taught at both the Columbia University and the University of Pennsylvania before his death.
