= Marieke de Winkel =

Dutch art historian and costume historian (born 1967)

- Born: 1967 (age 58–59); Renkum, Netherlands
- Education: University of Amsterdam, Courtauld Institute of Art
- Occupations: art historian, costume historian, professor

Marieke de Winkel (born 1967) is a Dutch art historian, professor, and costume historian specializing in seventeenth-century Dutch art, dress, and textiles. She is the Ottema-Kingma Foundation Professor for the History of Textiles and Dress at Radboud University.

De Winkel is known for her research on the representation and meaning of dress in Rembrandt’s paintings and for her wider scholarship on costume in the work of artists such as Frans Hals and Johannes Vermeer.

== Education and career ==
De Winkel studied art history and classical archaeology at the University of Amsterdam and history of dress at the Courtauld Institute of Art in London. She received her doctorate from the University of Amsterdam in 2002 or 2003, graduating cum laude with a dissertation on dress and meaning in Rembrandt’s paintings.

From 1993 to 2003, De Winkel worked as a research assistant with the Rembrandt Research Project in Amsterdam. She later remained affiliated with the project and contributed to scholarship surrounding the attribution, dating, and interpretation of Rembrandt’s paintings.

Her teaching at Radboud University centers on the history of fashion and fabrics, textile terminology, regional identity, and the role of clothing in portraiture and material culture.

== Scholarship ==
De Winkel’s first book, Fashion and Fancy: Dress and Meaning in Rembrandt's Paintings, was published by Amsterdam University Press in 2006 and grew out of her doctoral research. The book established her as a leading specialist on clothing in seventeenth-century painting.

She has published widely on Rembrandt and on costume in early modern Dutch painting. She also contributed to major Rembrandt reference works, including A Corpus of Rembrandt Paintings and the monograph Rembrandt. The Complete Paintings, co-authored with Volker Manuth.

== Selected publications ==
- Fashion and Fancy: Dress and Meaning in Rembrandt's Paintings (Amsterdam University Press, 2006)
- Rembrandt. The Complete Paintings (with Volker Manuth, Taschen, 2019)
- Rembrandt. The Complete Self-Portraits (with Volker Manuth, Taschen, 2025)
