= Mikołaj Rej =

Polish poet and writer (1505–1569)

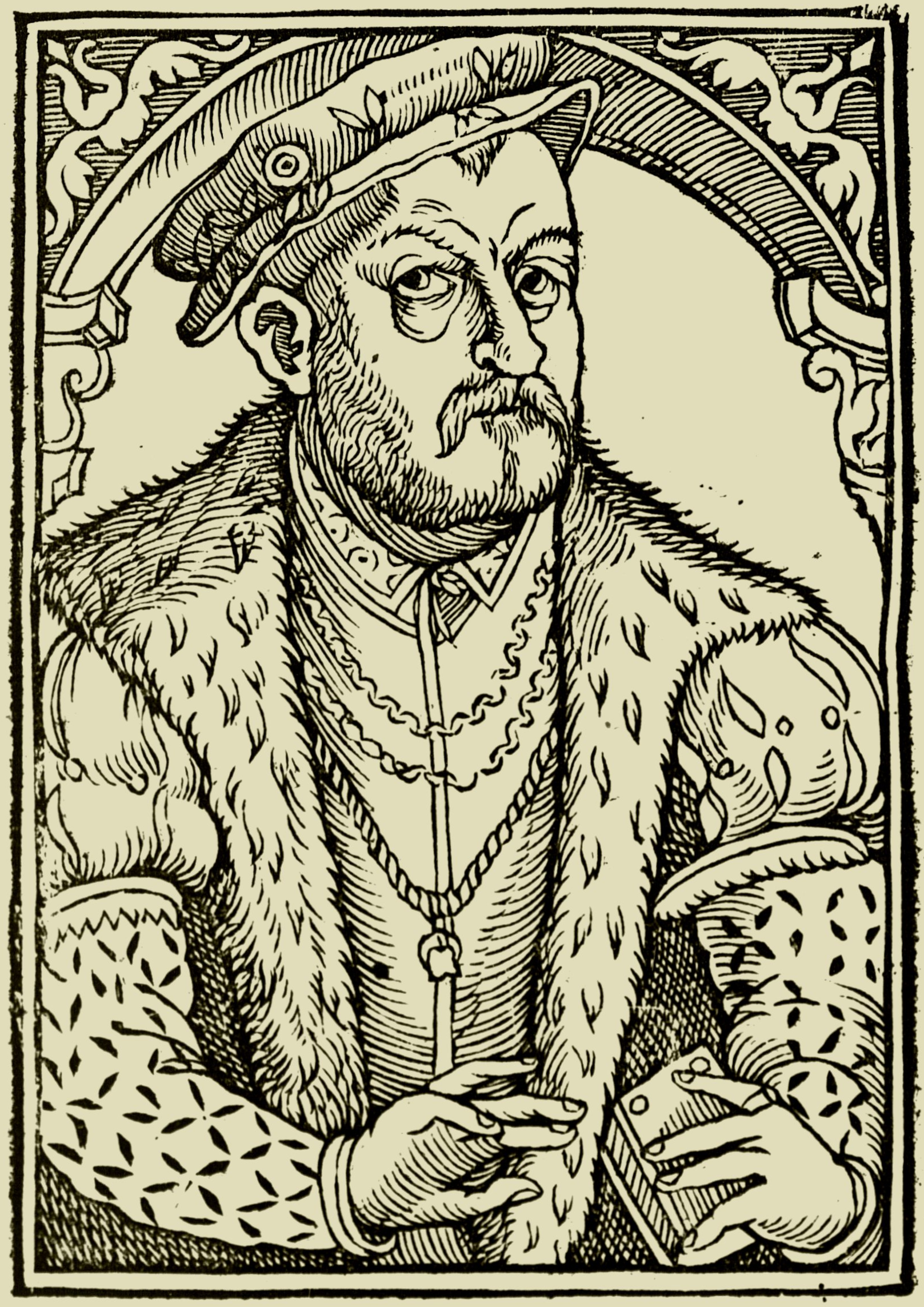
- Born: 4 February 1505; Żurawno, Kingdom of Poland (now Zhuravno, Ukraine)
- Died: Either 8 September or 5 October 1569 (aged 64); Rejowiec, Polish–Lithuanian Commonwealth
- Occupations: Poet, writer, politician, musician
- Relatives: Andrzej (Grandson); Andrzej (Great-grandson); Nicholas (descendant)
- Writing career
- Pen name: Mikołaj Rey
- Genre: Poetry
- Movement: Polish Reformation

Mikołaj Rej or Mikołaj Rey of Nagłowice (4 February 1505 – between 8 September and 5 October 1569) was a Polish poet, prose writer, politician, and musician of the early Polish Renaissance.

He was the first major author to write exclusively in the Polish language and is regarded, alongside Biernat of Lublin and Jan Kochanowski, as one of the founders of Polish literary language and literature.

== Life ==
Rej was born into the minor Polish nobility (ziemiaństwo), of the Oksza coat of arms, at Żurawno near Halicz. His father Stanisław, described as "a pious, honourable, and quiet man", had moved to the Ruthenian Voivodeship from Nagłowice near Kraków, with the assistance of a relative who was Archbishop of Lwów. His mother, Barbara Herburt, became Stanisław's second wife after he settled there. Although the young Rej received little formal education in Lwów and attended the Kraków Academy for only a single year at the age of thirteen, he largely educated himself through the study of Latin literature.

In approximately 1524, Rej began his service at the court of voivode Andrzej Tęczyński in Sandomierz. There, he acquired most of his vast knowledge in the field of humanities. He returned to his family's town of Topola and married Zofia Kosnówna (Kościeniówna). In 1531 Rej moved to Kobyle, in the Chełm area, which had been bequeathed to his wife, and thereafter, he frequented the court of Hetman Mikołaj Sieniawski. In either 1541 or 1548, Rej converted to Calvinism. He took part in synods and founded Protestant schools and communities on his lands.

Rej took part in sejms and thought his writing an important social mission. He was the first Polish writer to receive a substantial reward for his output. By the end of his life, he owned several villages and oversaw many. He received Temerowce from King Sigismund I the Old, and Dziewięciele from King Sigismund II Augustus as a lifelong possession and two towns, one of them Rejowiec, founded by Rej in 1547. Living during the Golden Liberty embraced by the Polish nobility, tolerance characterized his oversight and this philosophy was carried on by his sons. Rej died at Rejowiec in 1569.

On the five-hundredth anniversary of his birth, Mikolaj Rej was described as a "father of Polish literature", and it also was noted that his grandson, Andrzej Rej (diplomat), royal secretary and Calvinist, is Mikolaj's most prominent offspring. That grandson may be the subject of the 1637 painting by Rembrandt, A Polish Nobleman (perhaps, painted while he was visiting Amsterdam during a trip as a Polish ambassador on a diplomatic mission to the courts of the Danish, the English, and the Dutch).

== Works ==
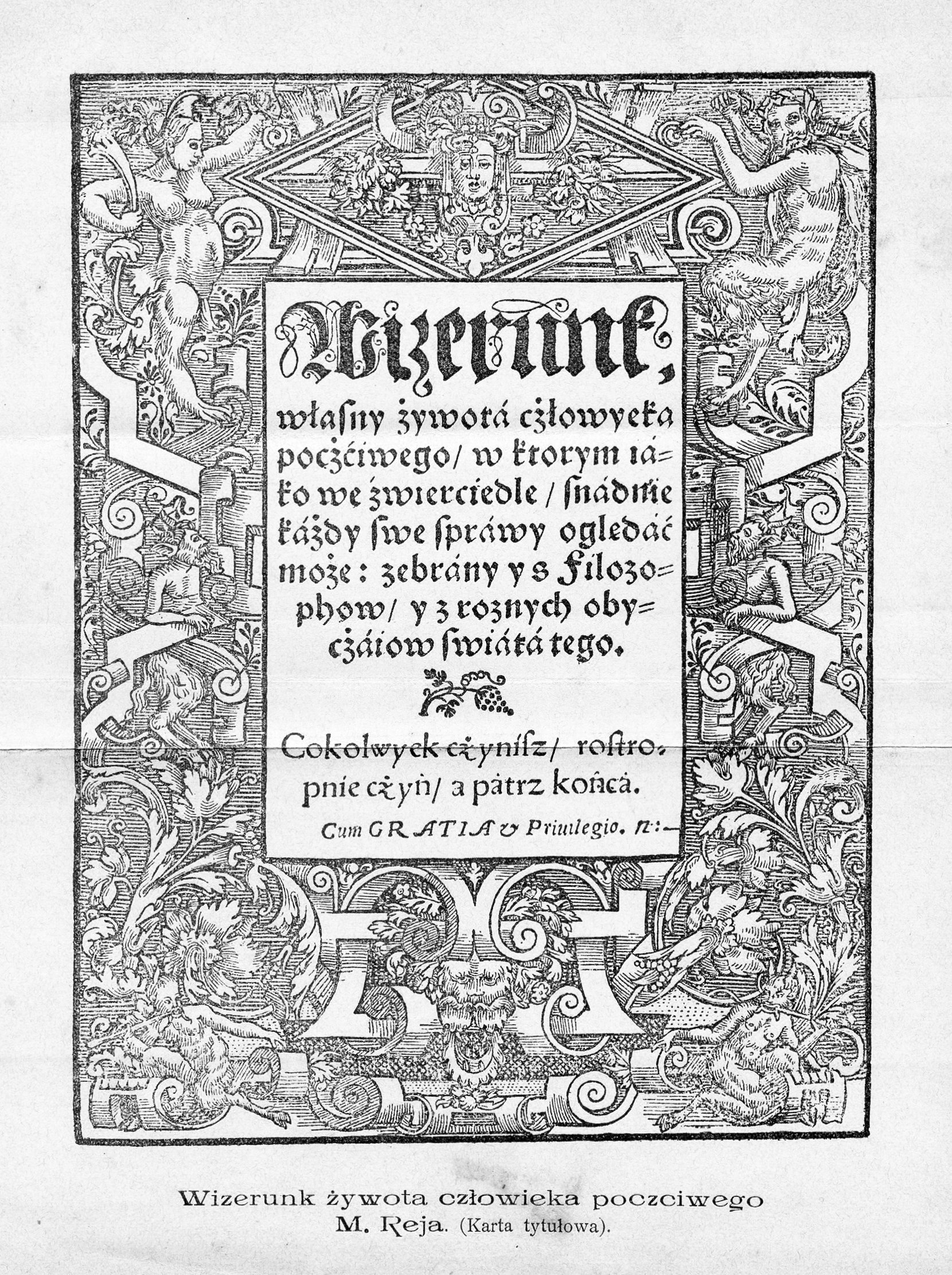
The Image of a Good Man's Life (1567)

In 1543 Rej debuted as a writer, under the pen name "Ambroży Korczbok Rożek," with his most famous book, A Brief Discussion among Three Persons: a Lord, a Commune Chief, and a Priest (Krotka rozprawa między trzemi osobami, panem, woytem a plebanem).

Rej's works touch on a large array of matters. He authored prose works that described the ideal of the Polish nobleman, criticized the Catholic Church, and showed a genuine solicitude for his country. His prose syntax is strongly influenced by Latin style.

His poetic meter discloses a deliberate effort to impart to the medieval metrical model with which he was so familiar, a regularity that it lacked. Rej's works include:

- Krótka rozprawa między trzema osobami: Panem, Wójtem i Plebanem (A Brief Discourse among Three Persons: a Lord, a Commune Chief, and a Priest), 1543, written under the pen name Ambroży Korczbok Rożek
- Żywot Józefa (The Life of Joseph), 1545
- Żywot Człowieka Poczciwego (The Life of the Honest Man)
- Kupiec (The Merchant), 1549
- Źwierzyniec, w którym rozmaitych stanów ludzi, źwirząt i ptaków kstałty, przypadki i obyczaje są właśnie wypisane. A zwłaszcza ku czasom dzisiejszym naszym niejako przypadające (The Bestiary, in which the forms, circumstances, and customs of people of various estates, animals, and birds are faithfully described, especially such as, in a manner of speaking, bear upon our present times), Kraków 1562; a Renaissance literary work comprising a collection of moral epigrams and satirical character portraits by Mikołaj Rej. Despite its animal‑themed title, the work is primarily a gallery of human types, with animals and birds functioning as literary devices within a broader moral commentary on sixteenth-century society. Rej presents representative figures, particularly from among the Polish nobility (szlachta), to articulate ideals of conduct, while satirical counterexamples demonstrate the consequences of failing to live according to those ideals.
- Zwierciadło (Speculum), incorporating the three-book prose Wizerunek własny żywota człowieka poczciwego (The Image of a Good Man's Life), 1567–68
- Rzecz pospolita albo Sejm pospolity (The Commonwealth, or the General Sejm)

== Quotation ==
A niechaj narodowie wżdy postronni znają,
iż Polacy nie gęsi, iż swój język mają.

Translation:

Let it by all and sundry foreign nations be known
that Poles speak not Anserine but a tongue of their own.

== Legacy ==
Oksza coat-of-arms, hereditary in Rej's family

In commemoration of the five-hundredth anniversary of the birth of Mikołaj Rej, Poland's Sejm (parliament) declared 2005 to be the Year of Mikołaj Rej.

In 1994–97, Rej's descendant and namesake, Nicholas Andrew Rey (1938–2009), served as American Ambassador to Poland.

== See also ==
- Jan Kochanowski
- List of Poles
- List of Polish poets
- Polish literature

== Notes ==
=== Bibliography ===
- Rey z Nagłowic, Mikołaj (1895) [1562]. Bruchnalski, Wilhelm (ed.). Źwierzyniec, w którym rozmaitych stanów ludzi, źwirząt i ptaków kstałty, przypadki i obyczaje są właśnie wypisane. A zwłaszcza ku czasom dzisiejszym naszym niejako przypadające [The Bestiary [or The Menagerie], in which the forms, circumstances, and customs of people of various estates, animals, and birds are faithfully described, especially such as, in a manner of speaking, bear upon our present times] (in Polish). Kraków: Academy of Learning.
