= Andrzej Rej (starost) =

Andrzej Rej (died 1664) was a Polish nobleman. An active Calvinist, he held the title of stolnik of Lublin. From 1659 to 1661 he served as starost of Małogoszcz. He was the great-grandson of the poet Mikołaj Rej.

== Bibliography ==
- M. Rawita-Witanowski, Dawny powiat chęciński, Kielce 2002, s. 277-288
- T. Żychliński, Złota księga szlachty polskiej, t. XV, s. 123
