= Andrzej Rej (diplomat) =

Polish diplomat

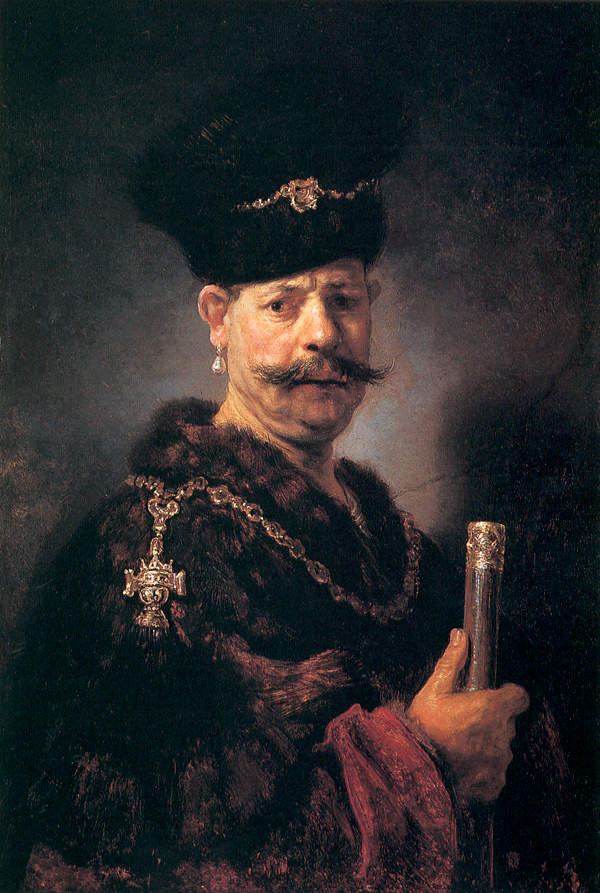
Andrzej Rej Portrait

Andrzej Rej (1584 - 13 February 1641, Skoki) was a Polish diplomat. Educated in Altdorf bei Nürnberg and Leiden, he was sent on a diplomatic mission to the Danish, British and Dutch courts in 1637 - he is one of the possible candidates for the subject of Rembrandt's A Polish Nobleman.

== Bibliography ==
- Bogusław Radziwiłł, Autobiografia, wstępem poprzedził i opracował Tadeusz Wasilewski, Warszawa 1979
- Jerzy Seweryn Dunin-Borkowski, Genealogie żyjących utytułowanych rodów polskich, Lwów 1895
