= 3 Maja Street =

3 Maja Street may refer to:

- 3 Maja Street in Bydgoszcz
- 3 Maja Street, Katowice
