= 3 Maja Street, Bydgoszcz =

Street in Bydgoszcz, Poland

Coordinates: 53°07′29″N 18°00′32″E

3 Maja Street in Bydgoszcz
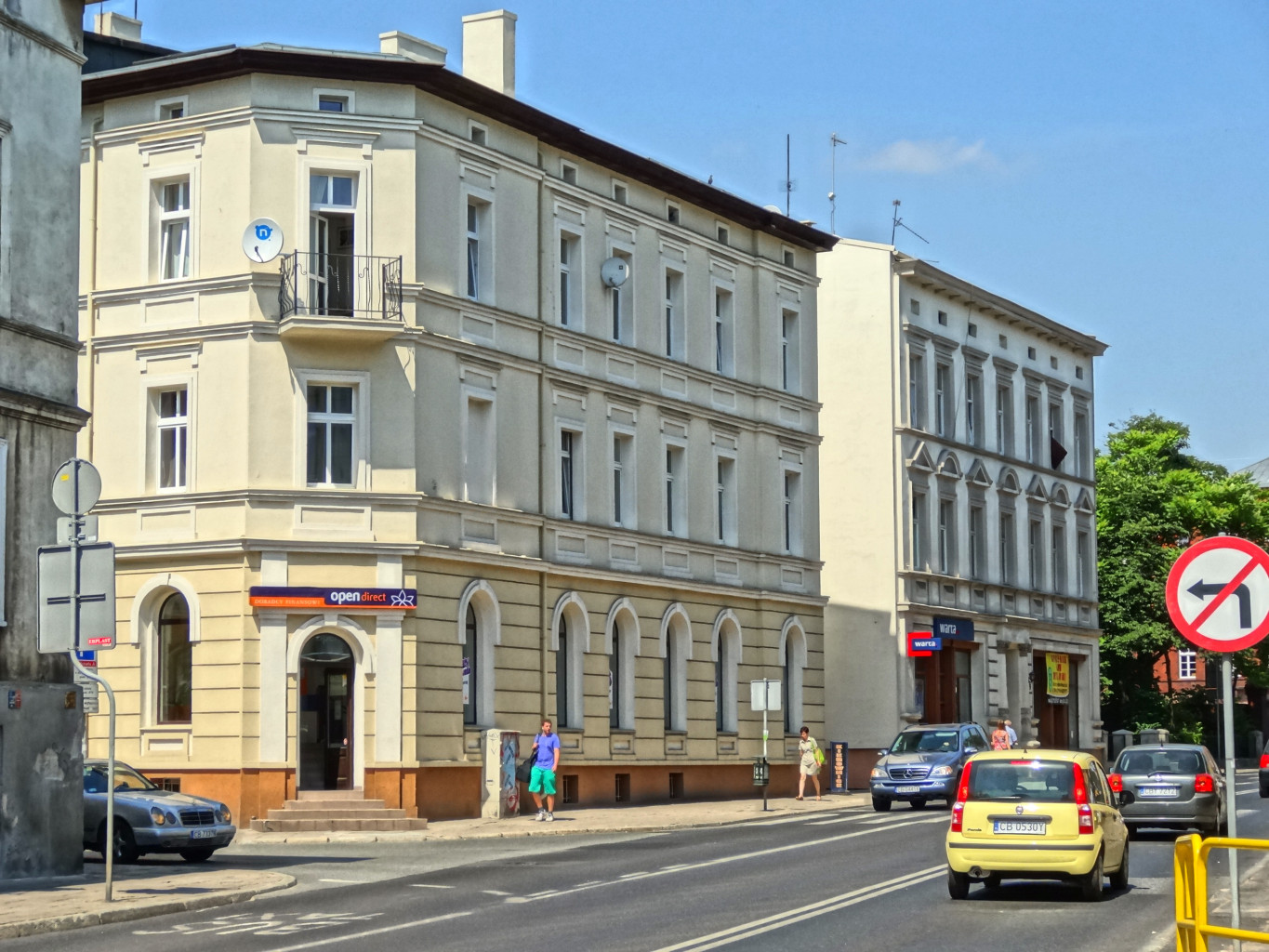
- View of the street at the crossing with Piotra Skargi street

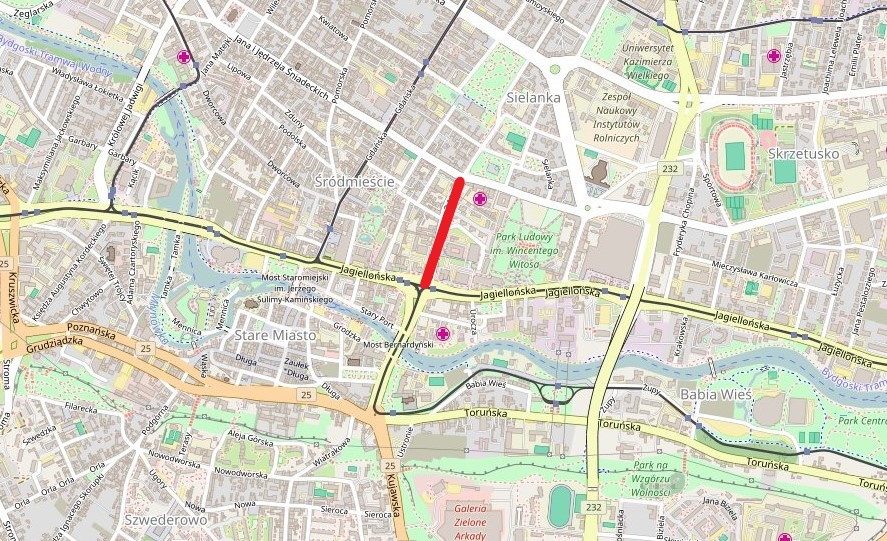
- 3 Maja street highlighted on a map
- Native name: Ulica Trzeciego Maja w Bydgoszczy (Polish)
- Former names: Grostwo, Hempel Feld, Hempel straße, Grodztwo
- Part of: Śródmieście district
- Namesake: 3 May Constitution Day
- Owner: City of Bydgoszcz
- Length: 400 m (1,300 ft)
- Width: ca. 10m
- Location: Bydgoszcz, Poland

Construction
- Construction start: Mid-19th century

3 Maja Street is a historical street in Bydgoszcz in Poland. It displays several murals.

== Location ==
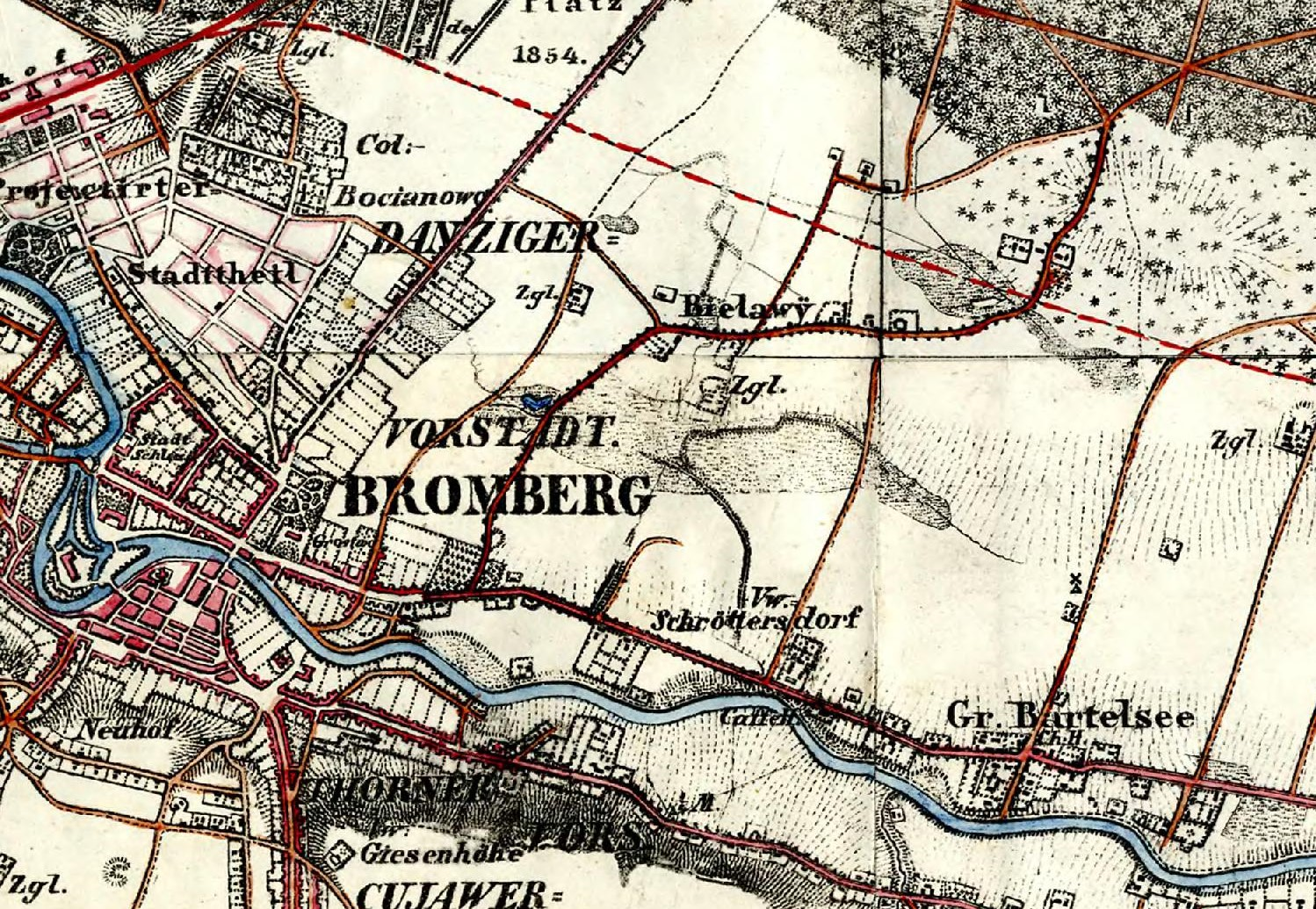
Bielawy area and the future rail track path (red dotted line), 1857

Parallel to the east to Gdańska Street, this south–north path starts from Jagiellońska street, crosses P. Skargi street and ends at the crossroad of Markwarta, Krasińskiego and Staszica streets.

It borders the western side of the Ludowy Park.

== History ==
In the 19th century, the region out of the city of then-Bromberg was devoted to farming. In the 1850s, the new railway track leading to Toruń cut the village of Bleichfelde (today's Bialewy district) into two parts. The southern side was then the target of financial magnates of Bromberg, parcelling out family farms from the newly acquired swaths of land.

Therefore, in 1851, Karl Hempel, after the death of his father (one of the wealthy investors), took over the Grostwo estate. The latter was quickly renamed Hempels Feld (Hempel's field) and the land was incorporated in 1858, into the Bromberg's territory under this calling, Hempel straße.

The path is clearly referenced in the maps of the last quarter of the 19th century. For certain periods of time, until the early 1930s, the street had been encompassing a northern extension, nowadays Staszica street. Such was the case:

- till 1865, the path being known as "Grostwo" (estate), then "Hempel field";
- from 1914 to 1918, as "Hempel straße";
- from 1919 to 1926, as "Grodztwo".

=== Naming ===
During its existence, the street bore the following names:

- Till 1858 "Grostwo" (estate) then "Hempels Feld";
- 1858–1920, Hempel straße. Named given after Karl Hempel (1827–1899) who took over the family estate then existing on the plot. Karl was a member of the German Reichstag from 1881 to 1884, representing the Bromberg region for the German Progress Party. He was also the co-founder and board member of the "Bromberger Gewerbebank". Furthermore, from 1868 onwards, he became a city councilor.
- 1920–1926, Grodztwo in reference to the Grostwo estate;
- 1926–1939, Ulica 3 Maja;
- 1939–1945, Hempelstraße;
- 1945–1948, Ulica 3 Maja;
- 1948–1956, Ulica 15 grudnia 1948 (15 December 1948 street), in reference to the date of the creation of the Polish United Workers' Party (Communist party which ruled Poland from 1948 to 1990);
- From 1956, Ulica 3 Maja (3rd of May street).

This name commemorates the "3 May 1791 Constitution Day".

== Main edifices ==
Medical College Buildings, at 13/15 Jagiellońska street

1850–1852

Functionalism

The building was erected between 1850 and 1852, as Bromberg hospital garrison. It was located then at the crossroads of then "Wilhelmstrasse" and "Hempelstrasse". The main building, U-shaped, was a monumental edifice of brick facades, with a three-storey body, flanked by 2 avant-corps in its corners: they were higher than the facade and topped with battlements, like medieval towers. Originally the building had a symmetrical facade along a two-storey avant-corps topped with battlements, where was located the main entrance, and three extra barracks for the sick. Additional elements were built regularly until 1910:

- In the back of the lot in 1881 an outbuilding was constructed;
- In 1890–91, a new western edifice part housed hospital administration and direction;
- In 1910, a new, ground-floor morgue was built.

In 1919, with the recreation of the Polish state, city authorities took over the hospital from Prussian militaries. The size of Bydgoszcz garrison and the proximity with the fighting area of Polish–Soviet War increased significantly the activity of the institution: in 1920, under the command of Poznań General District, the medical capacity of the institution reached the maximum amount of 1,140 beds. After the conflict the number of hospitalized patients steadily decreased, with 320 beds (1922), 300 beds (1923) and 200 in 1924–1925. In 1928, Toruń military authorities decided to stop the activity of Bydgoszcz hospital, which had only 100 beds left, keeping only the District Hospital in Toruń. In this way, Bydgoszcz remained till 1939 without Military medical department.

During Nazi occupation, the building was used as a German military hospital.

After the liberation of Bydgoszcz, from 26 January to 10 February 1945, hospital buildings accommodated a Mobile Field Surgical Hospital of the Polish Army. In 1948, a huge renovation occurred: expansion of the main building, demolition five secondary edifices. The renovated complex housed the Provincial Council of Polish Communist Party till the end of the communist era.

In 1990, the edifice became the property of the Regional Treasure Department: at that time, several buildings passed to the ownership of the Collegium Medicum in Bydgoszcz, which housed here offices of the rector, two deaneries, college administrators, some classrooms, a cafeteria and an additional dormitory. Around 2000, with Tax and Revenue office leaving the premises, the whole building fell under the responsibility of the university.

From the former buildings of the garrison hospital, only the U-shaped footprint is left. It was initially constructed in the style of historicism, using forms of Neo-Romanesque. Its appearance resembled a fortress, but these stylistic features have been lost during the complex reconstruction carried out in 1947–1948, which also wiped away the avant-corps, changed the size and shape of the windows, added a fourth floor and extended the gable to the whole edifice.

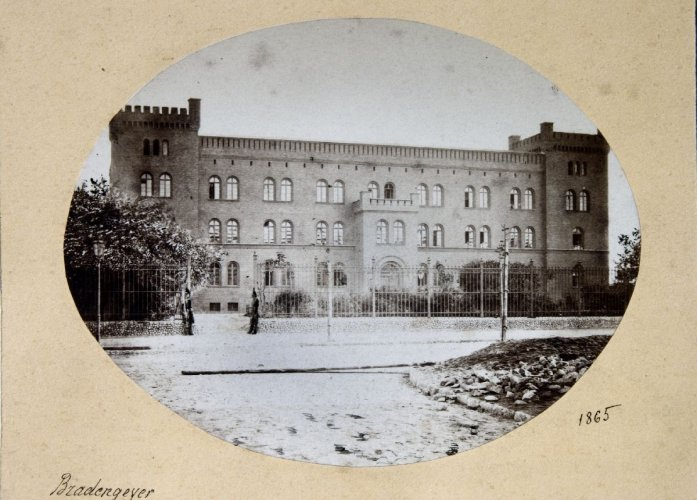
Garrison Hospital in 1865, with its original features

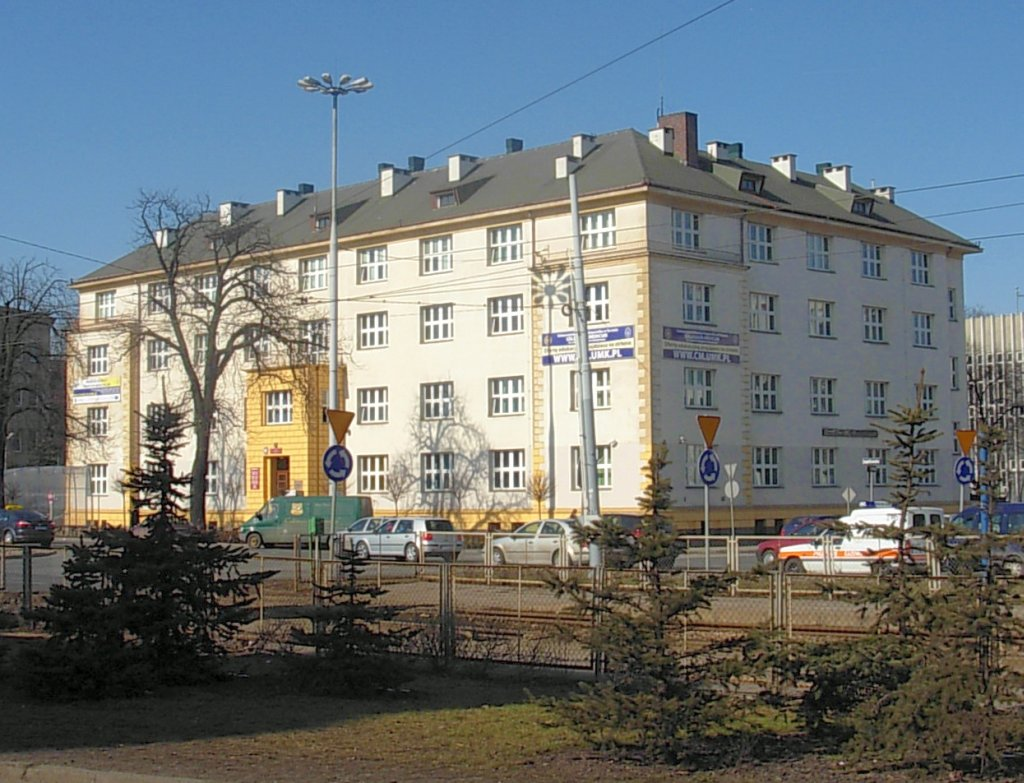
Current view of N.13/15 from Jagiellońska street

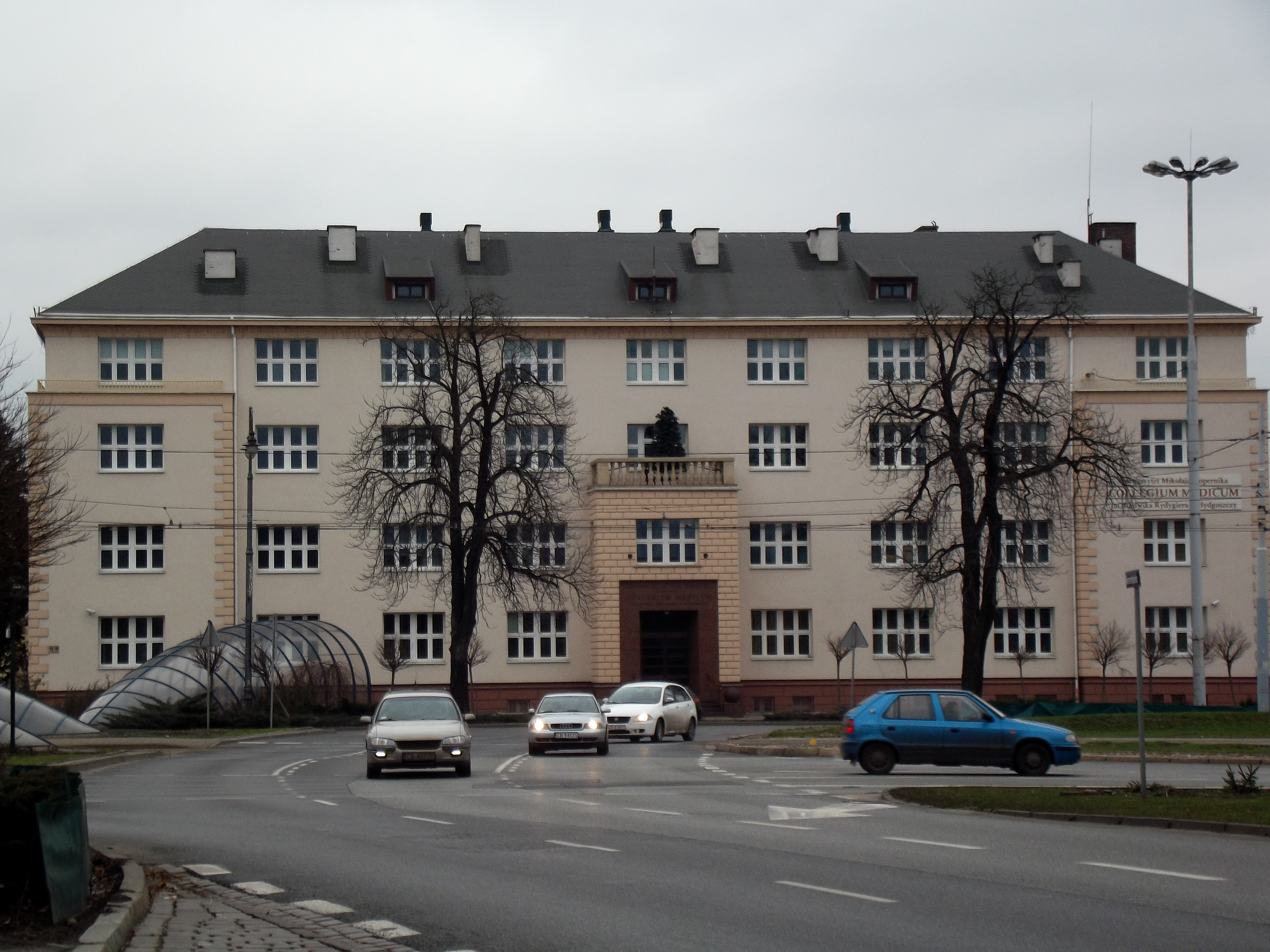
N13/15 from Jagiellońska roundabout

House at 3

End of 19th century

The building was belonging to the hospital complex built during Prussian period. The ensemble, which survived till today, was referred to as "Garnisonlazaret" ("Garrison hospital"), at "1/4 Hempelstraße". Property of the Collegium Medicum of Bydgoszcz, it houses today a student club.

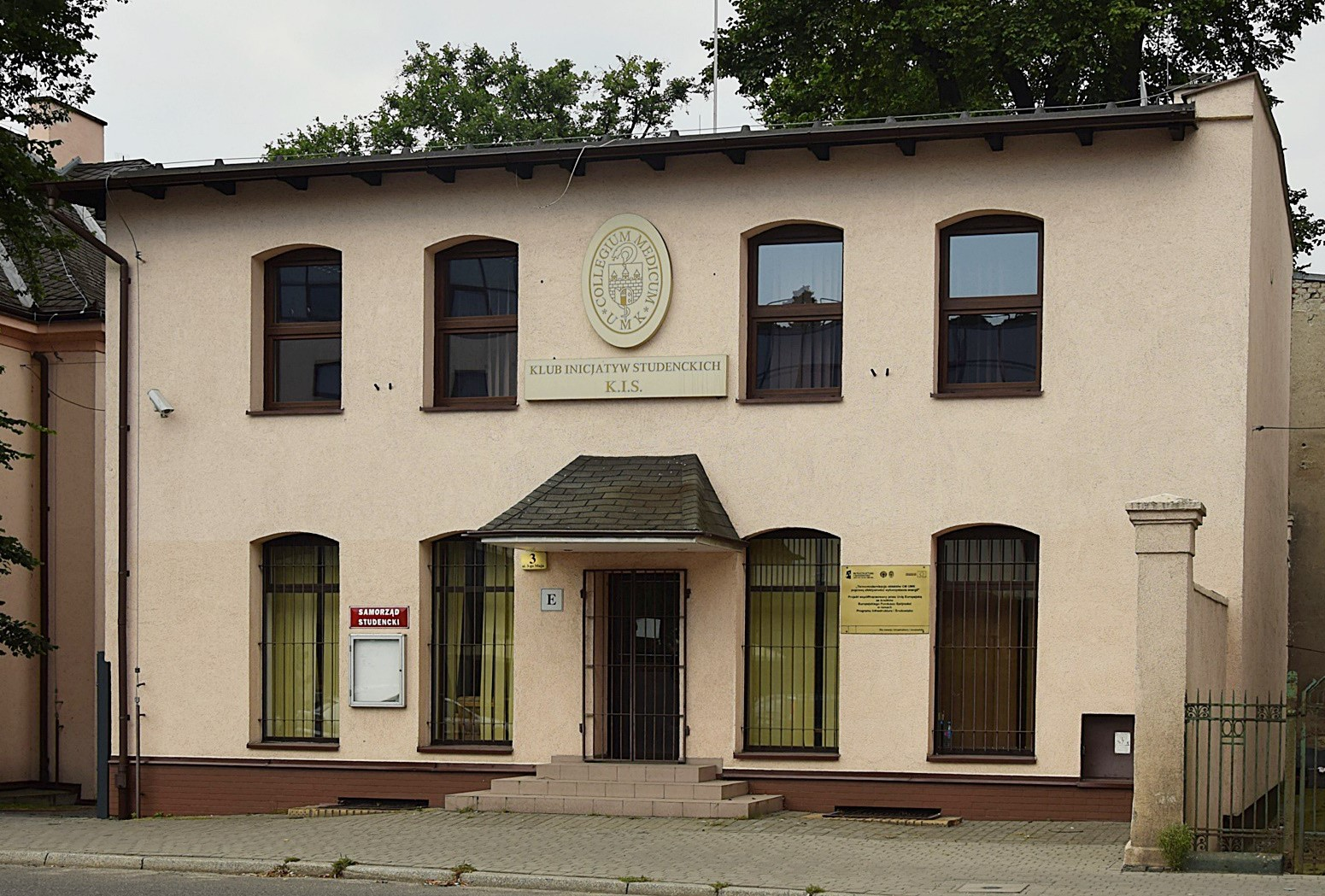
View from the street

House at 5

1875–1900

The house, at then 2 Hempelstraße, was first owned by a rentier, Leopold von Wedell. In the early 1880s, Rudolf Stawiß, working in a transport firm, took it over. Lastly, Richard Reimer, a metal construction specialist, purchased the house at the eve of the 20th century and kept it until the outbreak of WWII.

The building displays a classical architecture, with a wall gable onto the street. On its right side, the edifice keeps an original wrought iron fencing.

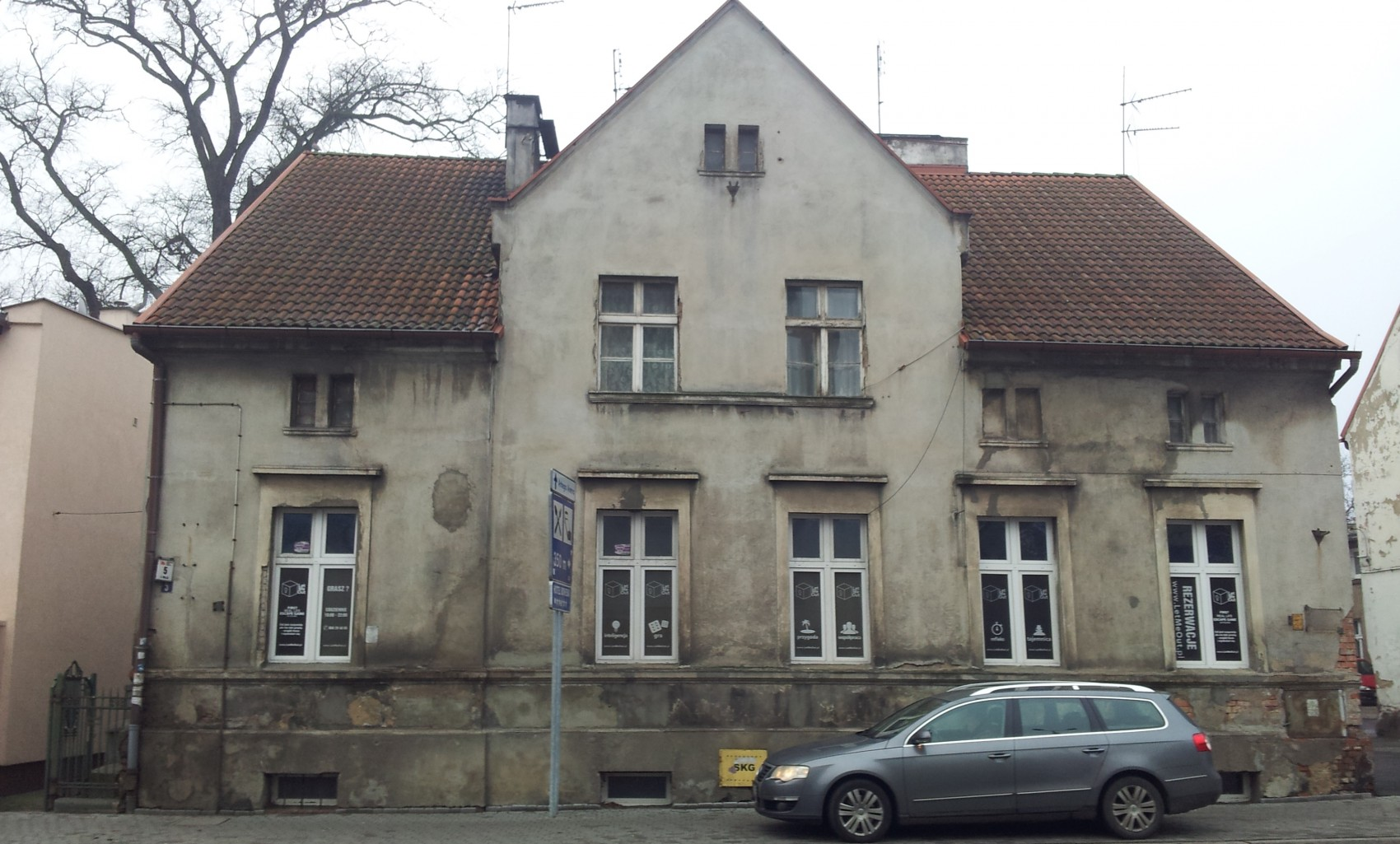
View from the street

City Hotel at 6

1992

A 4-star hotel, equipped in particular with conference and banquet rooms, a restaurant, a bar, a casino and a hairdressing salon.

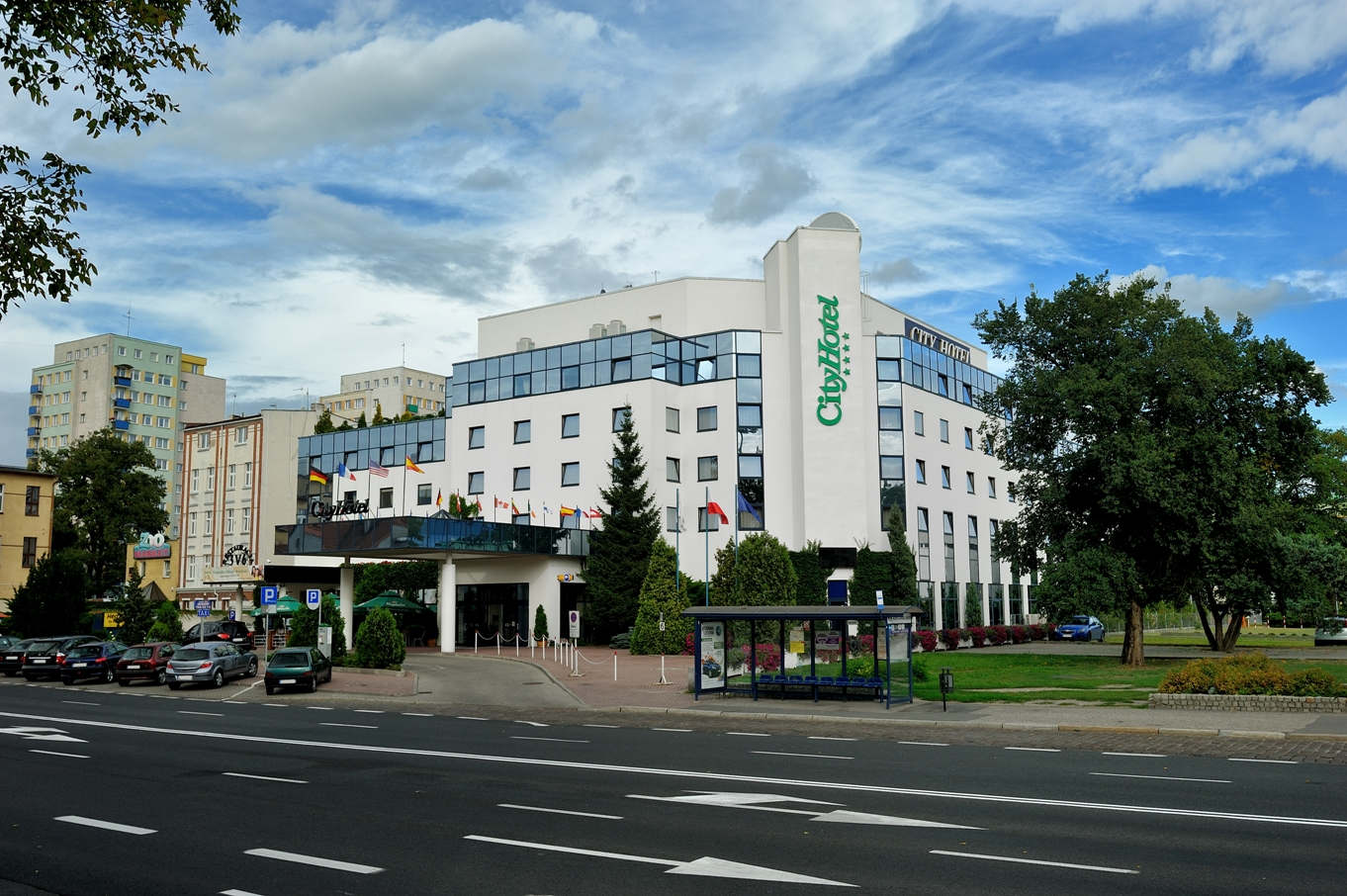
View from 3 Maja street

Roßoll's house at 7

1875-1900

The building was acquired by Karl Roßoll in the mid-1870s. The family kept it till the start of WWI. At that time, the new landlord became Wilhelm Stanelle, a roofing worker.

The house has been refurbished in 2016–2017.

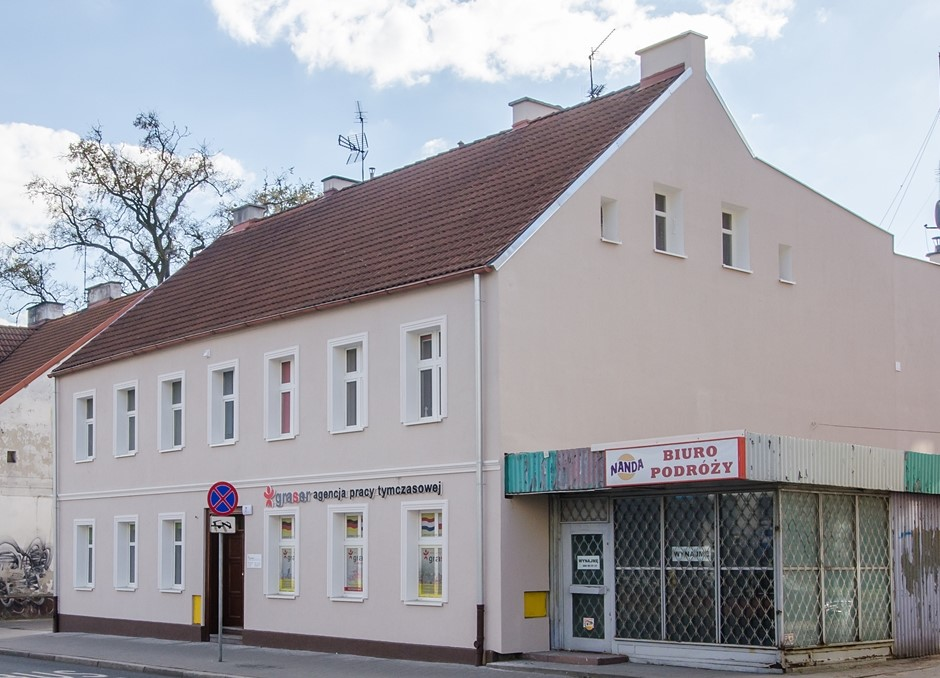
View from the street

Tenement at 13 Piotra Skargi street, corner with 3 Maja street

1894-1895

Eclecticism & Neo-Renaissance

This tenement at then 6 Hoffmann straße has been designed as a habitation building. In the 1890s, one of the tenants were Clara & Hans Joop, photographs, relatives of Theodore Joop, famous photograph of the city: Hans and Clara ran the studio located at Wilhelm straße 15, now Focha Street.

The architecture reflects main features of end of 19th century Eclecticism, so present in the streets of Bydgoszcz (e.g. Dworcowa Street, Gdańska Street or Pomorska Street). One can notice arched windows on the ground floor, designed to house shops or restaurant. A small balcony overhangs the corner entry.

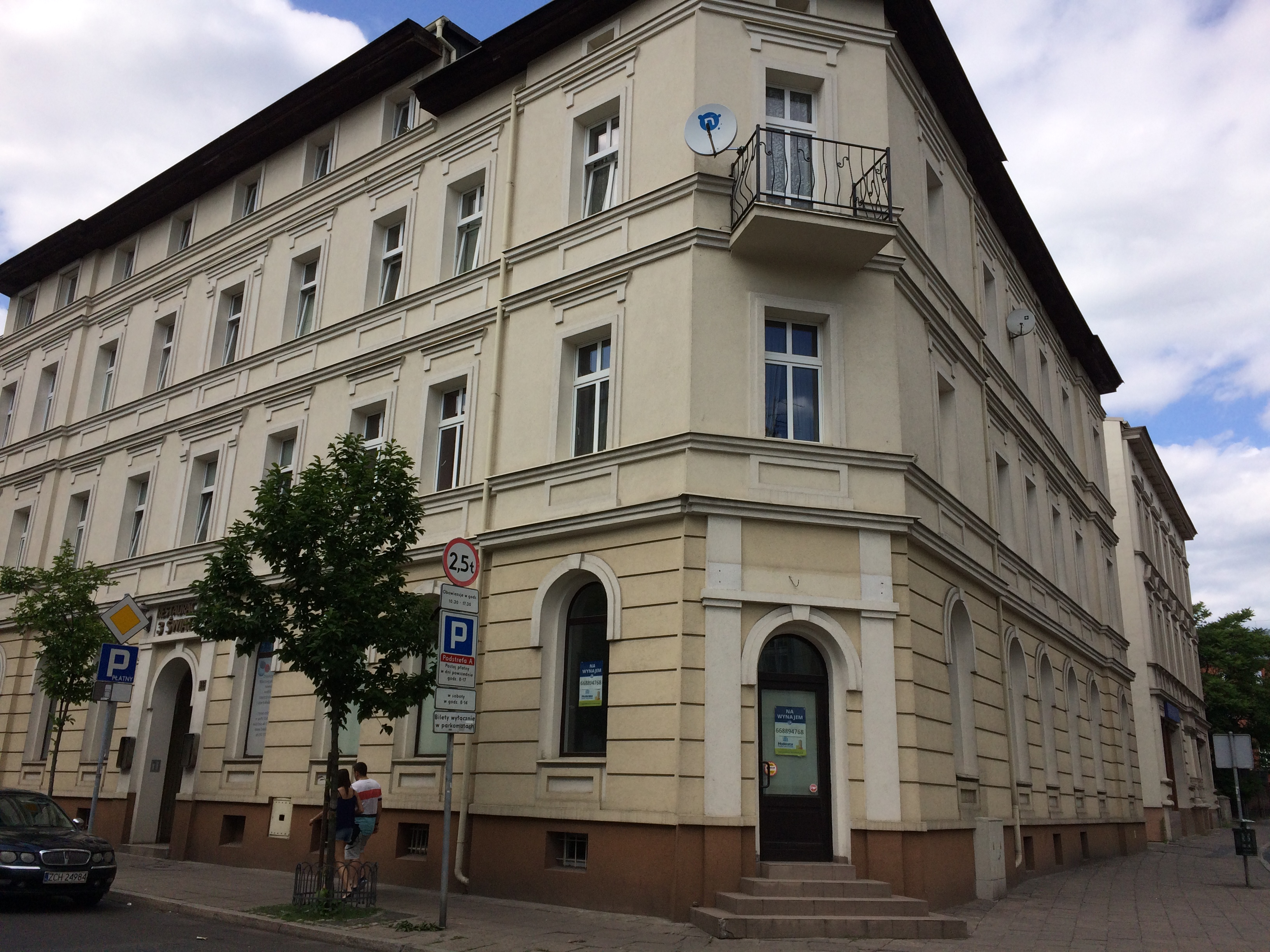
Corner view

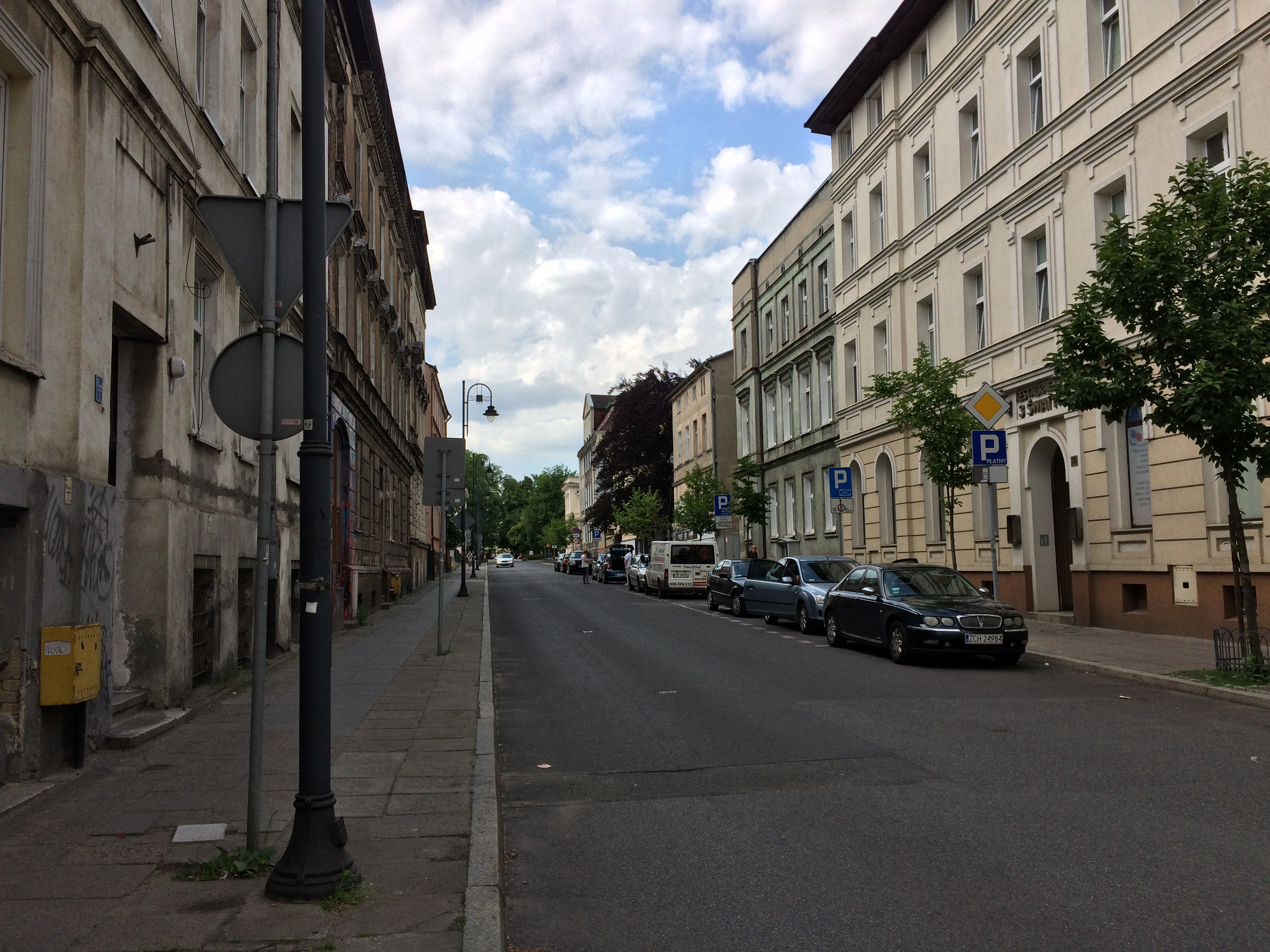
Street view with Nr.13 facade on the right

Biziel's tenement house at 8

1906-1907

Late Art Nouveau, early Modern architecture

The first landlord was Leonhard ßech, a fountain builder (German: brunnenbaumeister). In 1930, Jan Biziel, a local physician, social activist and city councilor of Bydgoszcz, bought this building, albeit still living at 3 Cieszkowskiego street. After his demise in 1934, Pelagia, one his three daughters, managed the building till after the Second World War.

Restored in 2016–2017, the tenement boasts early modernist features. The use of bricks adds to the decoration style. One can notice the presence of an Art Nouveau stucco on the top of the elevation, as well as a double-panel carved wooden door. The back building (at 10) mirrors the same brick-layered style.

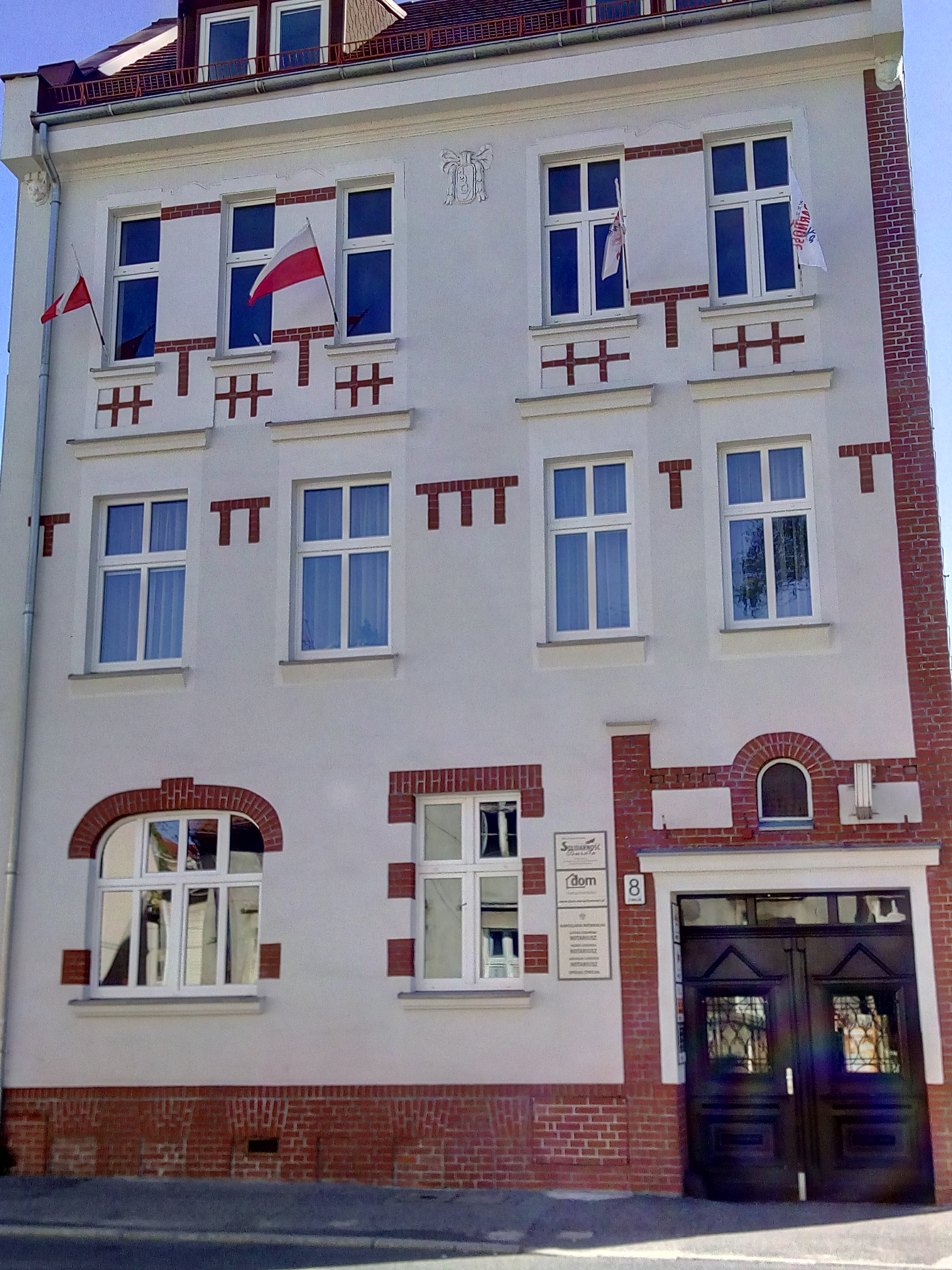
Main frontage

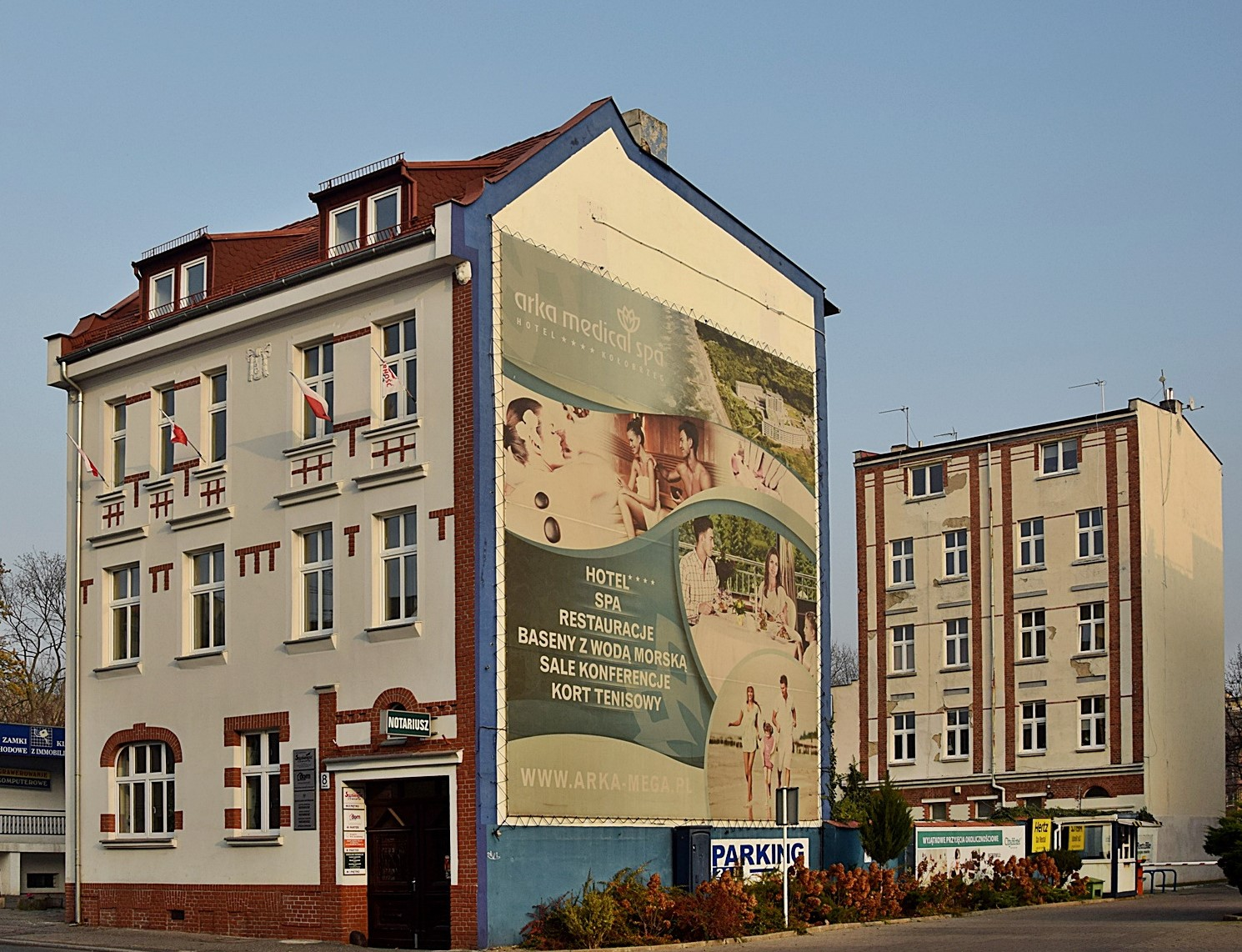
View of 8 (front) and 10 (back)

Tenement at 14 Piotra Skargi street, corner with 3 Maja street

1870s

Eclecticism & Neo-Renaissance

This tenement at then Hoffmann straße 7 has been designed as a renting house by the landlord, Karl Roßoll, living at nearby Hempel straße (now 3rd May street). From 1927 to 1938, the premises housed the Municipal Institute of Music (Polish: Miejski Instytut Muzyczny), before it moved to 71 Gdańska Street.

The tenement is unfortunately in bad shape.

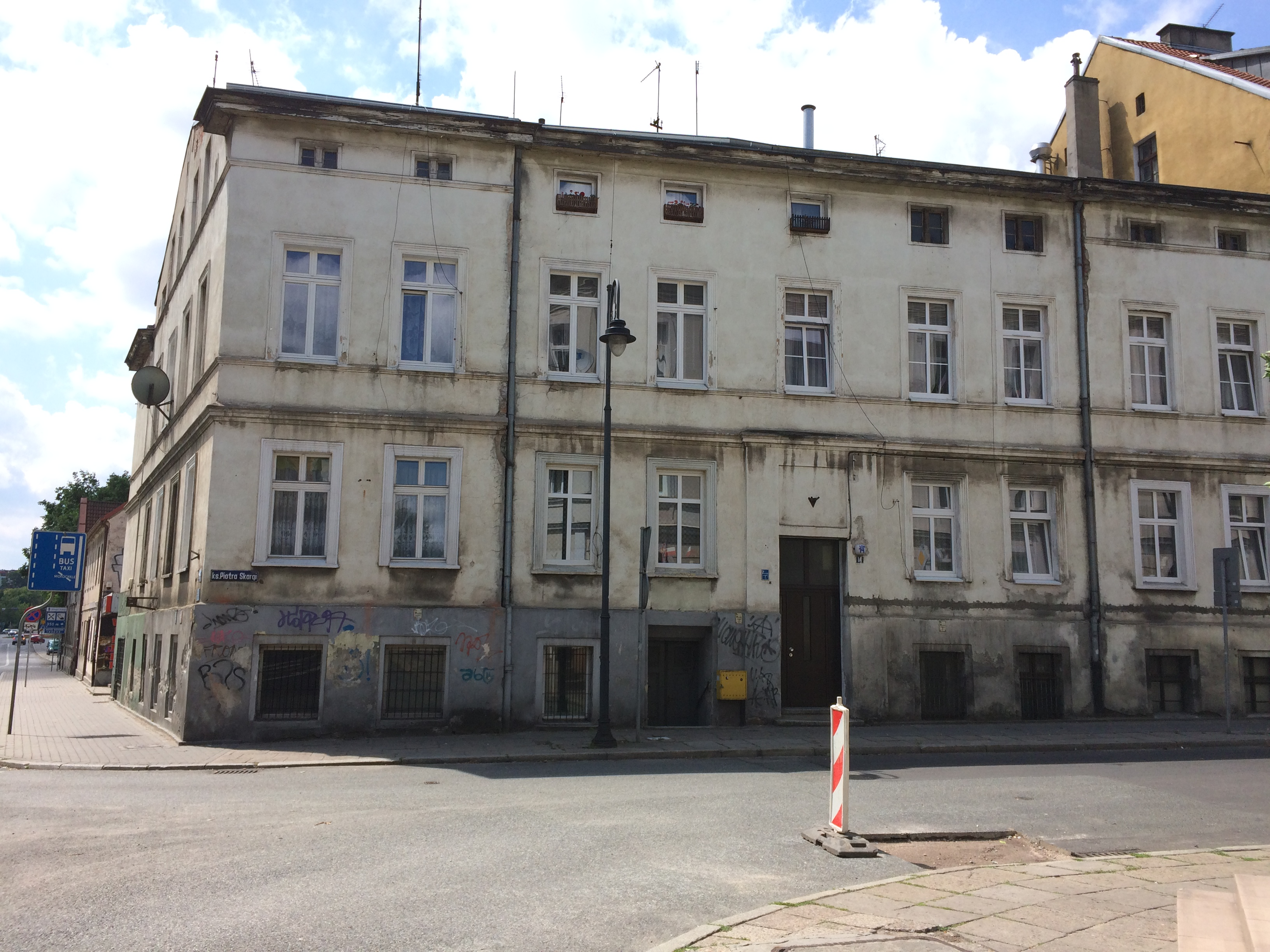
Corner view

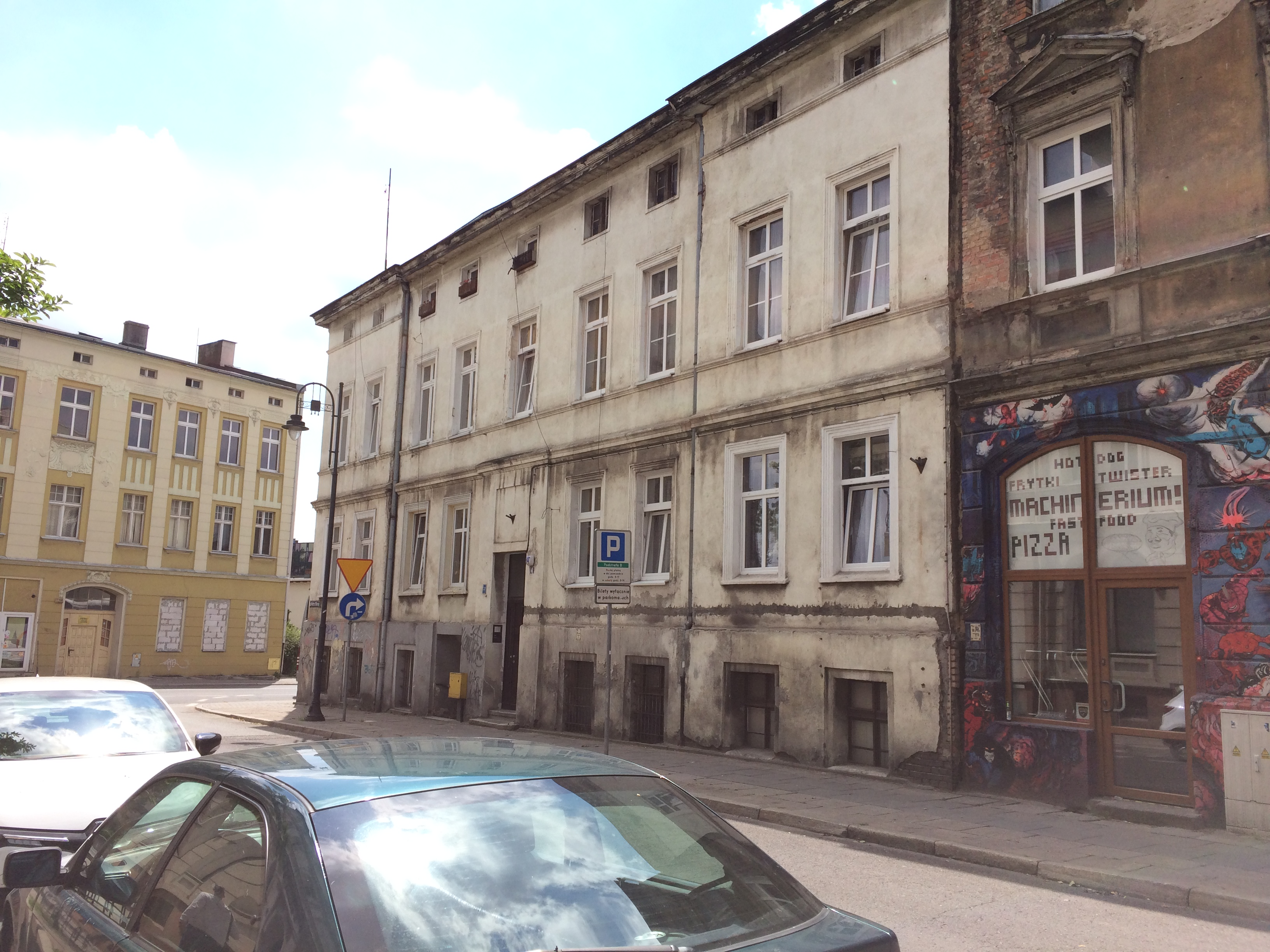
View of the facade on Piotra Skargi street

Tenement house at 9

1895

Eclecticism

The tenement was owned at its inception by Mrs Sokolowska, a widow.

The main elevation shows neo-classical style with bossage, pediments and an entrance portal embellished with two flanking columns.

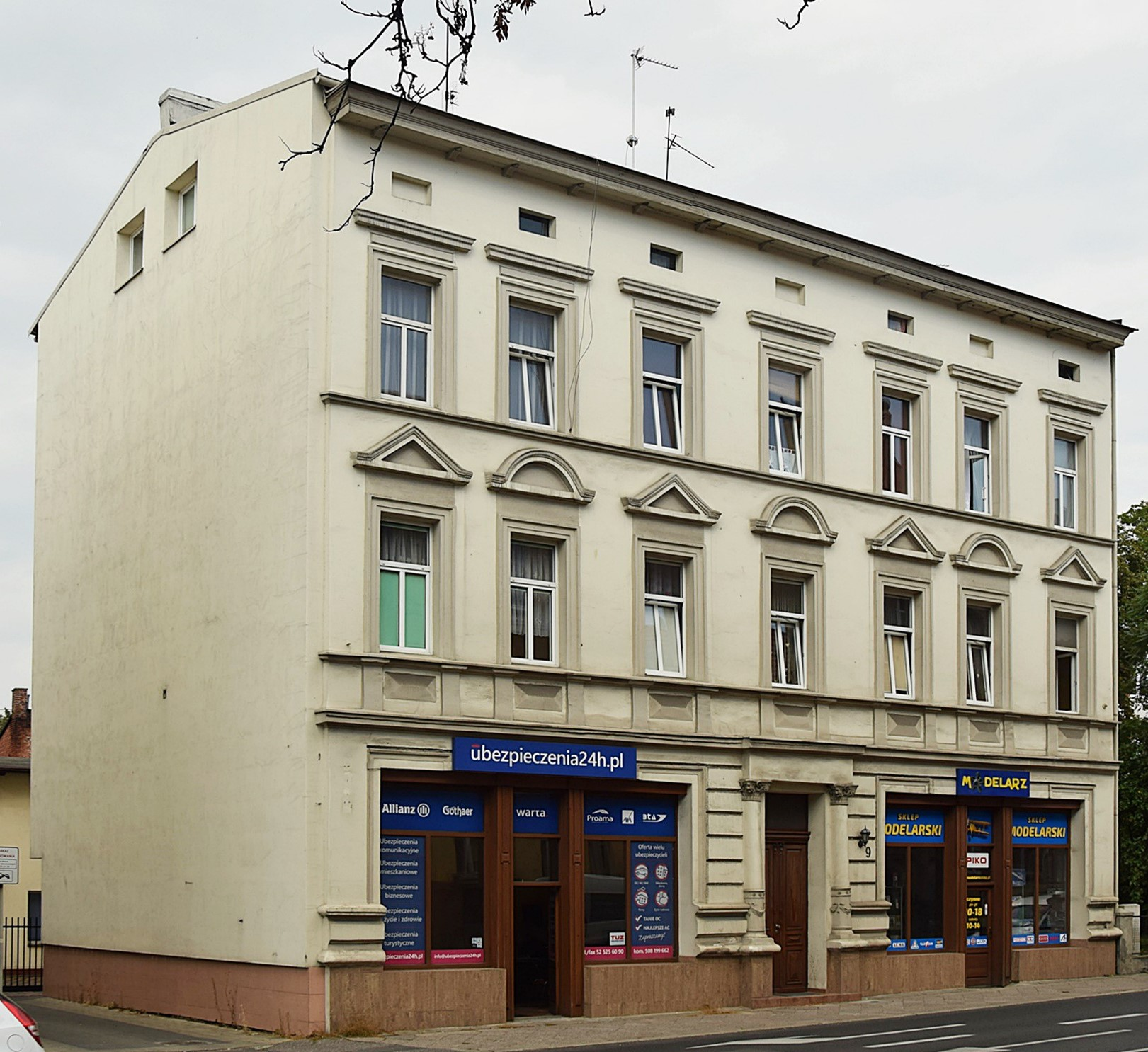
Main elevation onto the street

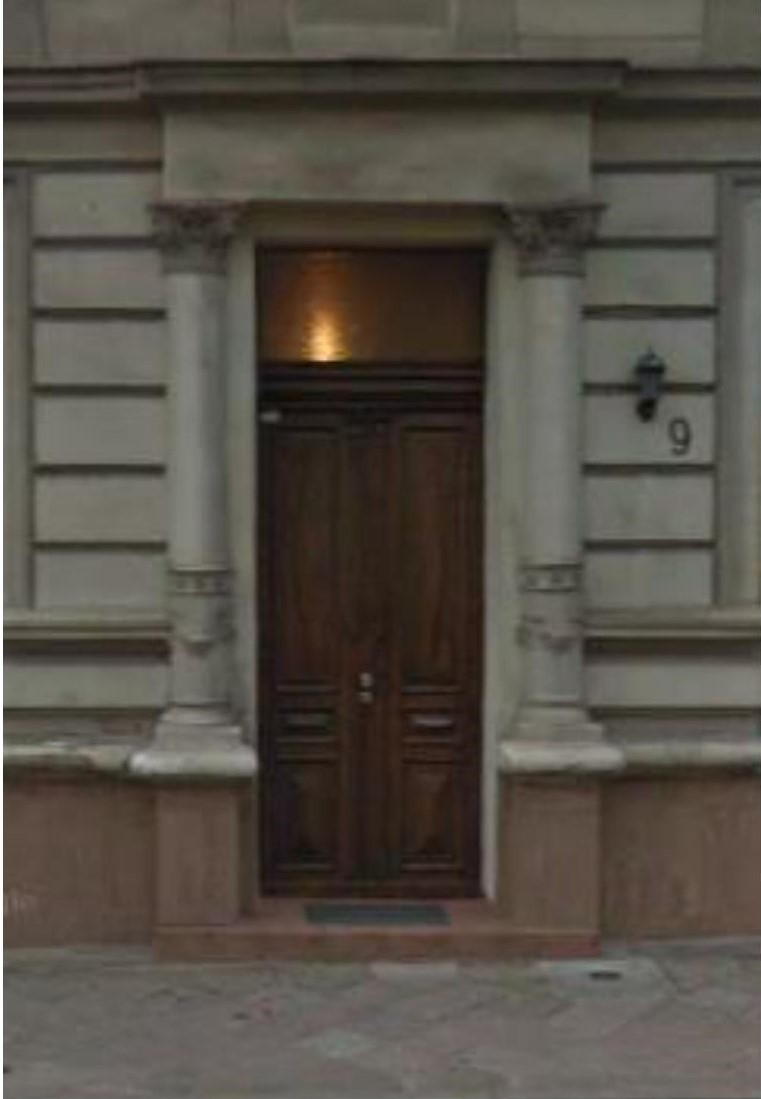
Details of the door at 9

House at 11

1875-1900

Historicism

The house is presumably the oldest one standing in the street, as it was initially owned by Karl Hempel who lived then at "53 Wilhelm straße" (present day 22 Jagiellońska street). In 1890, Albert Voigt, a military doctor (German: Oberstabsarzt), moved there. He was serving at the 3rd (Neumark) Mounted Grenadiers "Baron Derfflinger" on "Schubiner straße" (now "Ulica Szubińska").

After the rebirth of Poland (1920), the landlord was Father Wacław Pacewicz. He was the director of a school for girls at 65 Gdańska street. Two months after the liberation of Bydgoszcz (March 11, 1945) Father Pacewicz was taken to the seat of the Security Office, a building at Markwarta street and was presumably murdered there by the Ministry of Public Security - Ministerstwo Bezpieczeństwa Publicznego. In the 1930s, the building was managed by the Municipal Treasury (Polish: Skarb państwa).

The municipality authorities purchased the building in 2017, in order to set up a specialized kindergarten for visually impaired and blind children, as an extension of the main schooling complex located on the abutting plot.

Although very damaged, one can still notice some wooden decoration on the eaves.

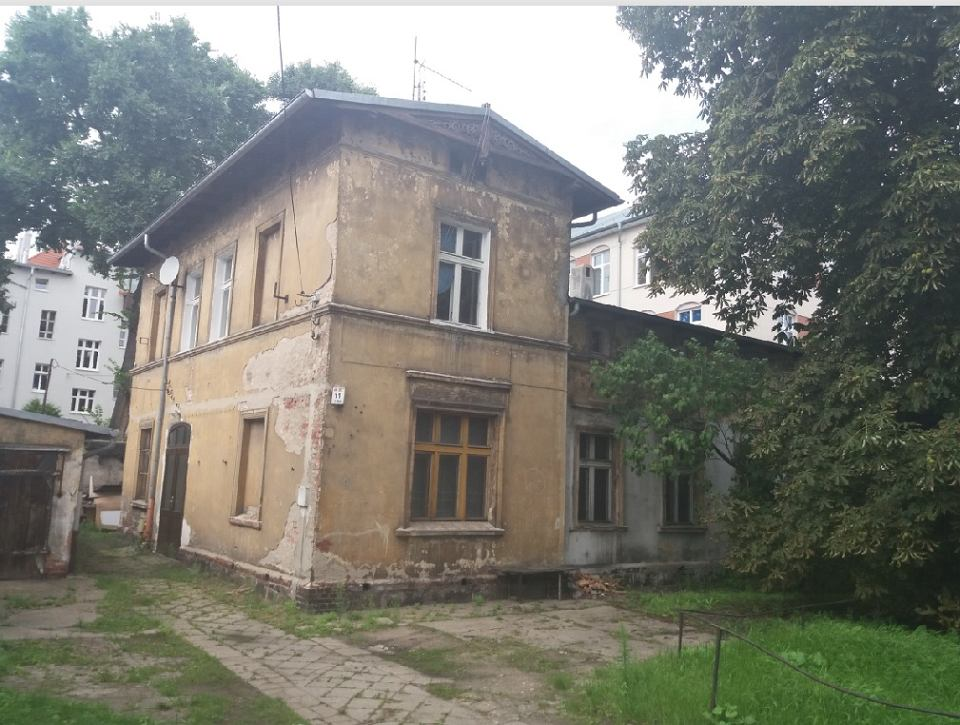
View of the front house

Wegner's tenement house at 14

1905-1915

Late Art Nouveau

Albert Wegner was a master cooper. The family kept ownership of the building till the outbreak of WWII.

The building is in bad shape and has been purchased by a private businessman in 2018 to be renovated.

The main elevation still shows beautiful Art Nouveau elements festoons and floral motifs.

Two murals have been realized on the large side facades:

- "Zamilcz" ("Silence") in 2007, on the southern side;
- "Ptasiek" ("Birdy") in 2009, on the northern side.
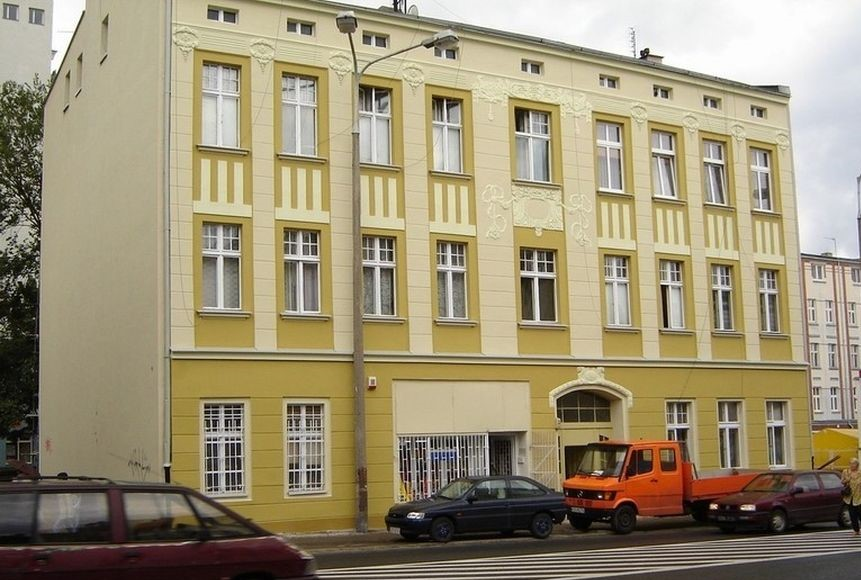
View from P. Skargi street

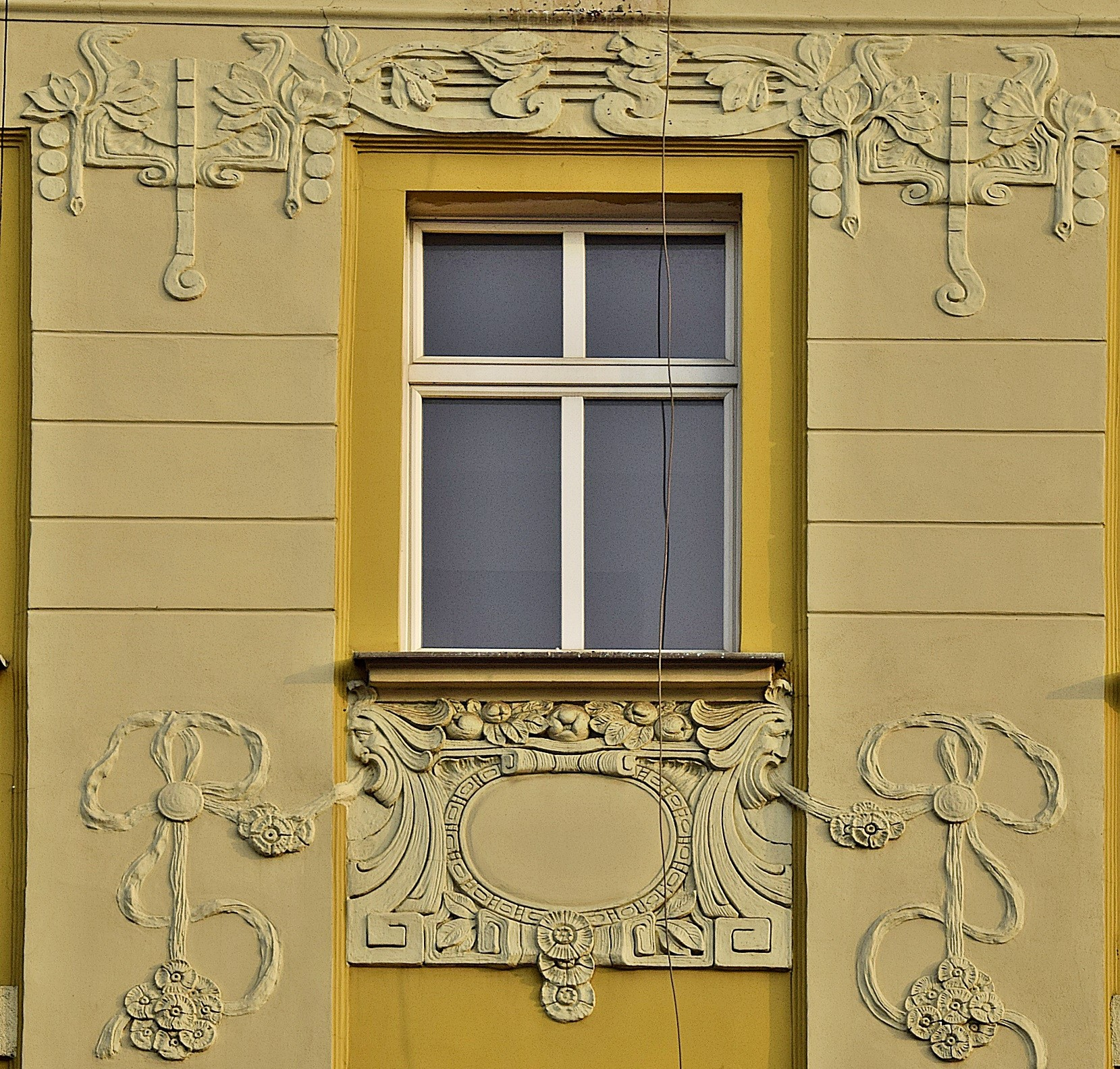
Decoration details

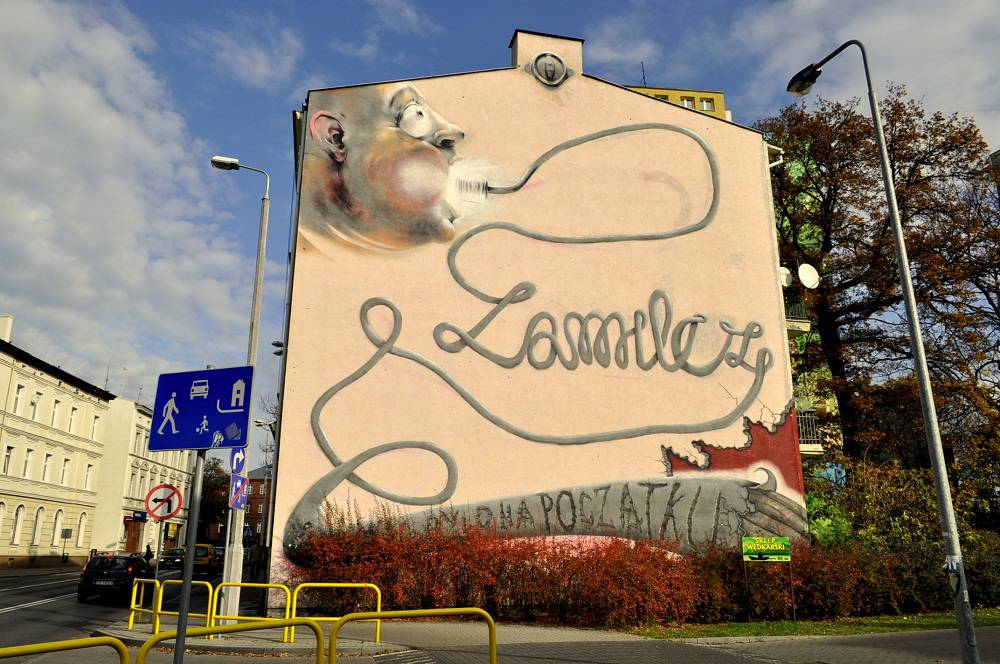
"Zamilcz" mural

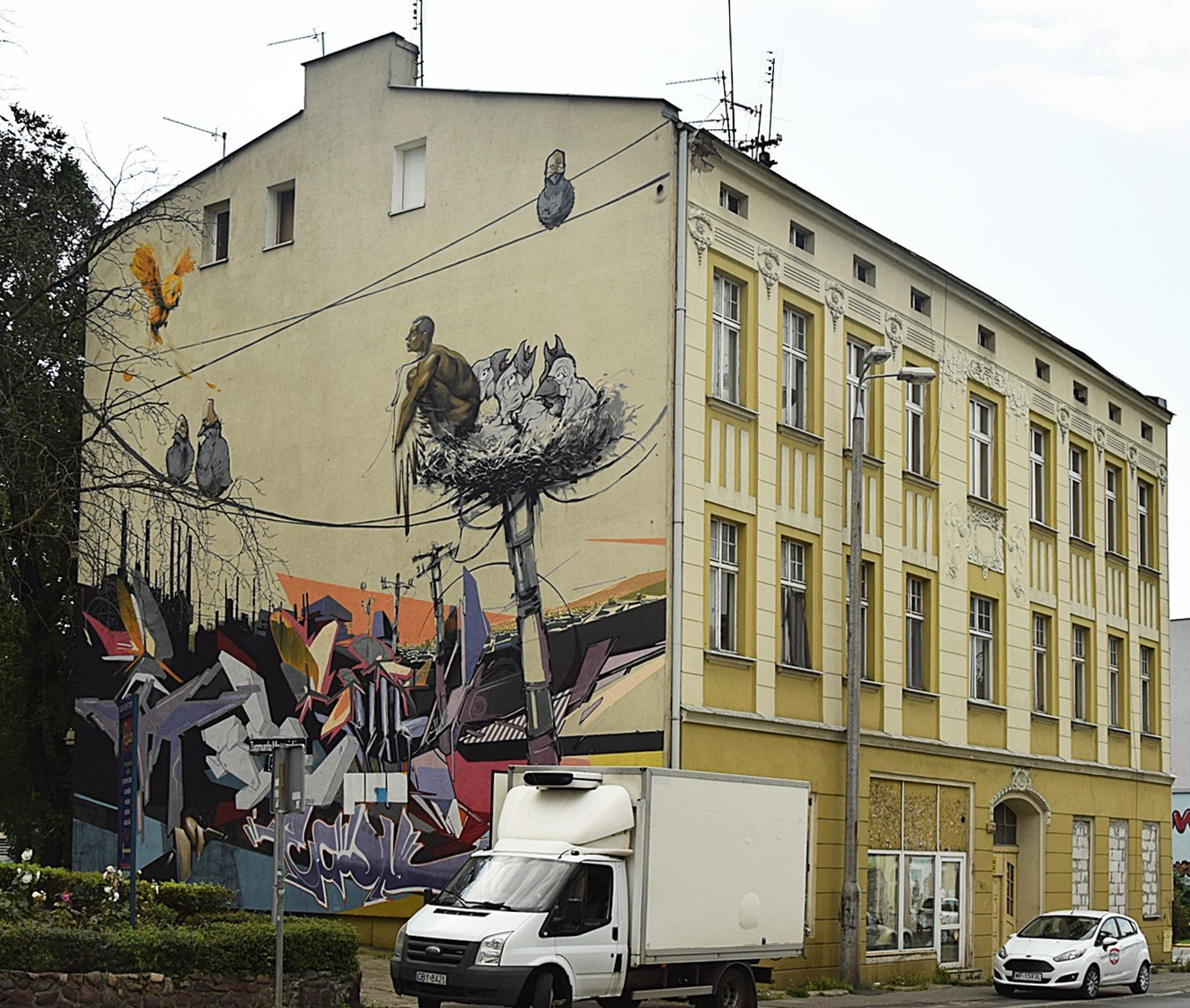
Northern facade and "Ptasiek" mural

Tenement house at 18

1911-1912

Early Modern architecture

First landlord was Otto Krauße, working as an assistant in the postal service.

The two massive avant-corps are distinctive of the period of construction in the city. One can find same instances at 10 Gdańska street, 18 Paderewskiego street or 28 Swiętej Trojcy street. The arched covering the entrance is also noticeable.

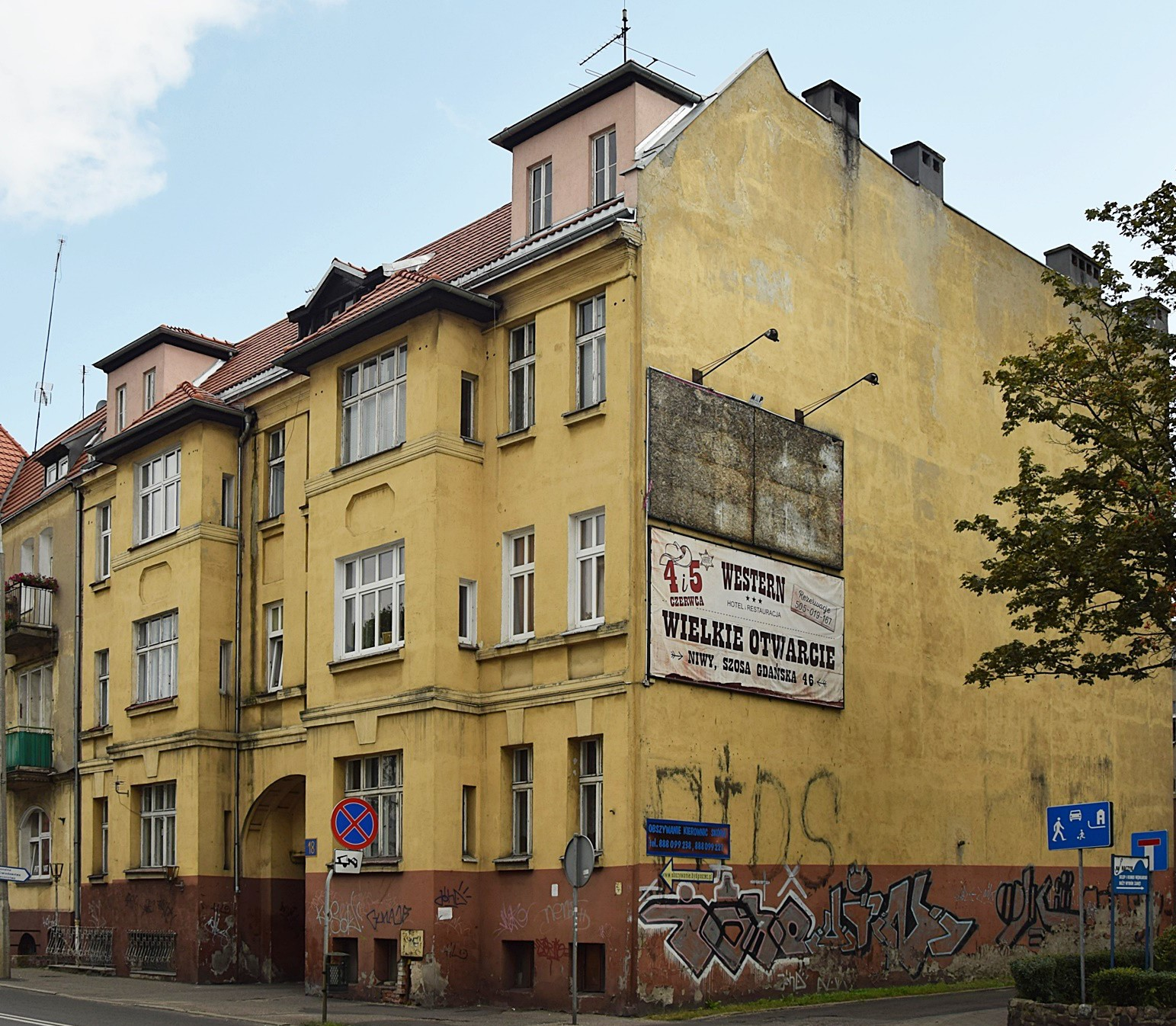
Facade on the street

Otto Wieze's tenement house at 20

1906-1907

early Modern architecture

The first landlord of the tenement at then "24 Hempel straße" was Otto Wieße, a mason and an architect. He was as well the owner of the neighbouring building at 22.

The damaged building still showcases nice features: a large transom light above the entrance door, original wrought iron fenced balconies, a rectangle bay window and an ogee wall gable topped by spheric pinnacles. The house is planned to be refurbished in 2021–2022.

The left side wall of the building displays a preserved piece of tiled mosaic characteristic of the 1920s. It is presumably a remnant of an apartment belonging to a demolished abutting house.

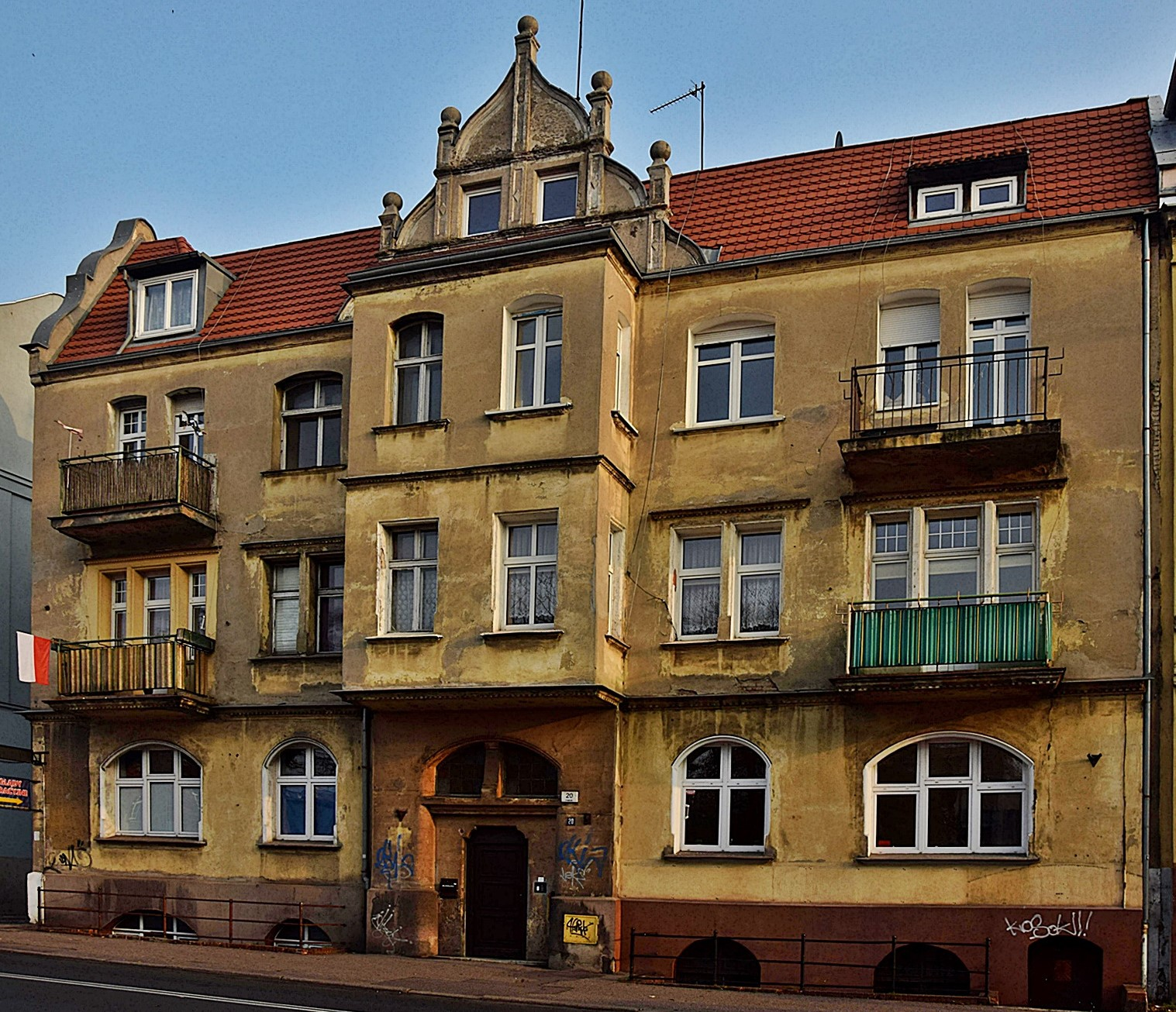
Main frontage

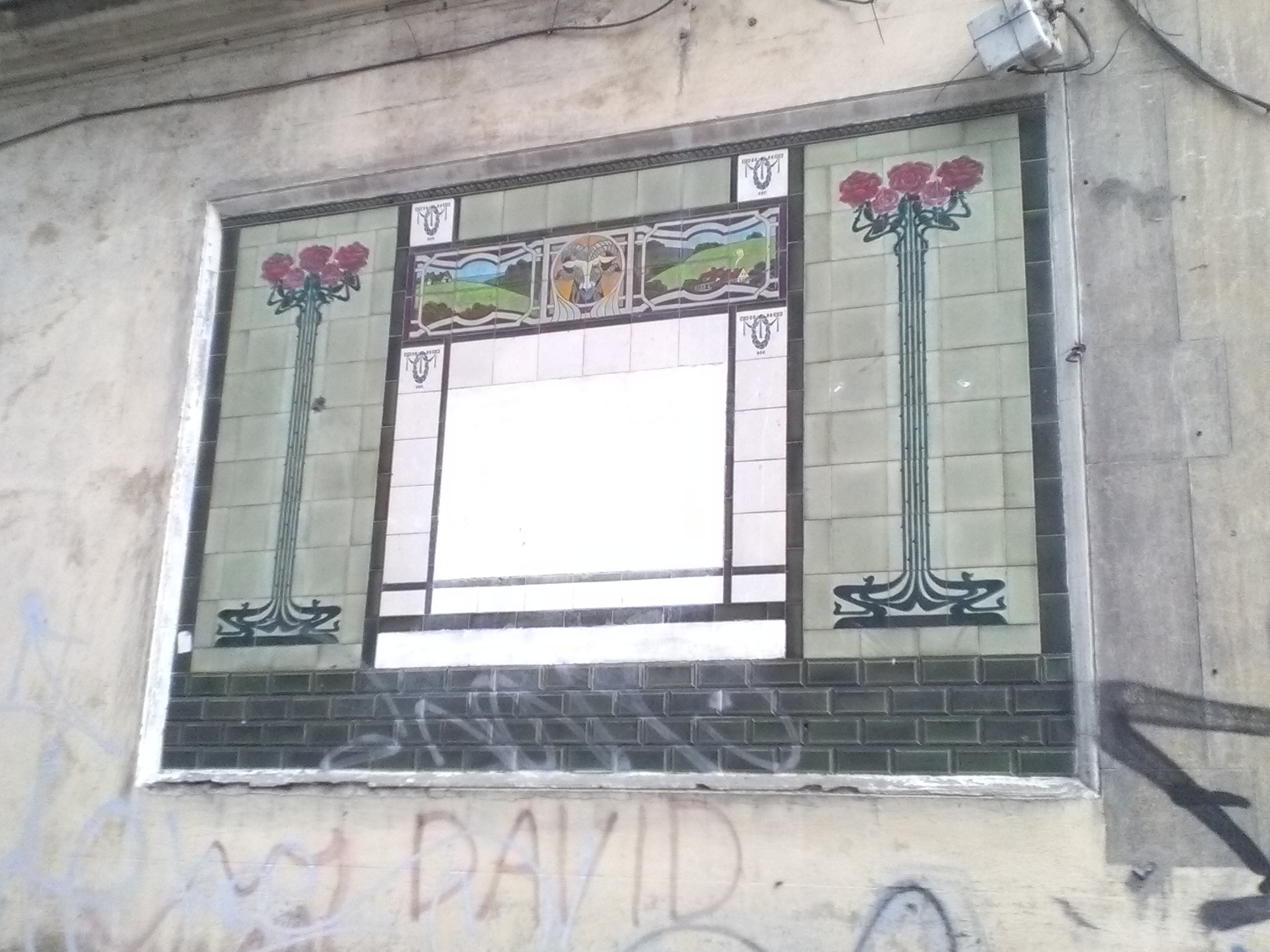
Mosaic on the side wall

Otto Wieze's tenement house at 22

1909-1910

Early Modern architecture

Otto Wieße, a mason and an architect, owner of the building at 20, was also the landlord of this edifice. He has been living there till the end of WWI before moving to his tenement at 20.

Early modernist elements, inspired by Art Nouveau but bare of any superfluous motifs, are incorporated into the facade: a round columned open bay window, loggias and an top arched wall gable. The only compromise is reduced to the entrance door, with stylized columns and a minimalist floral motif frieze in place of the lintel.

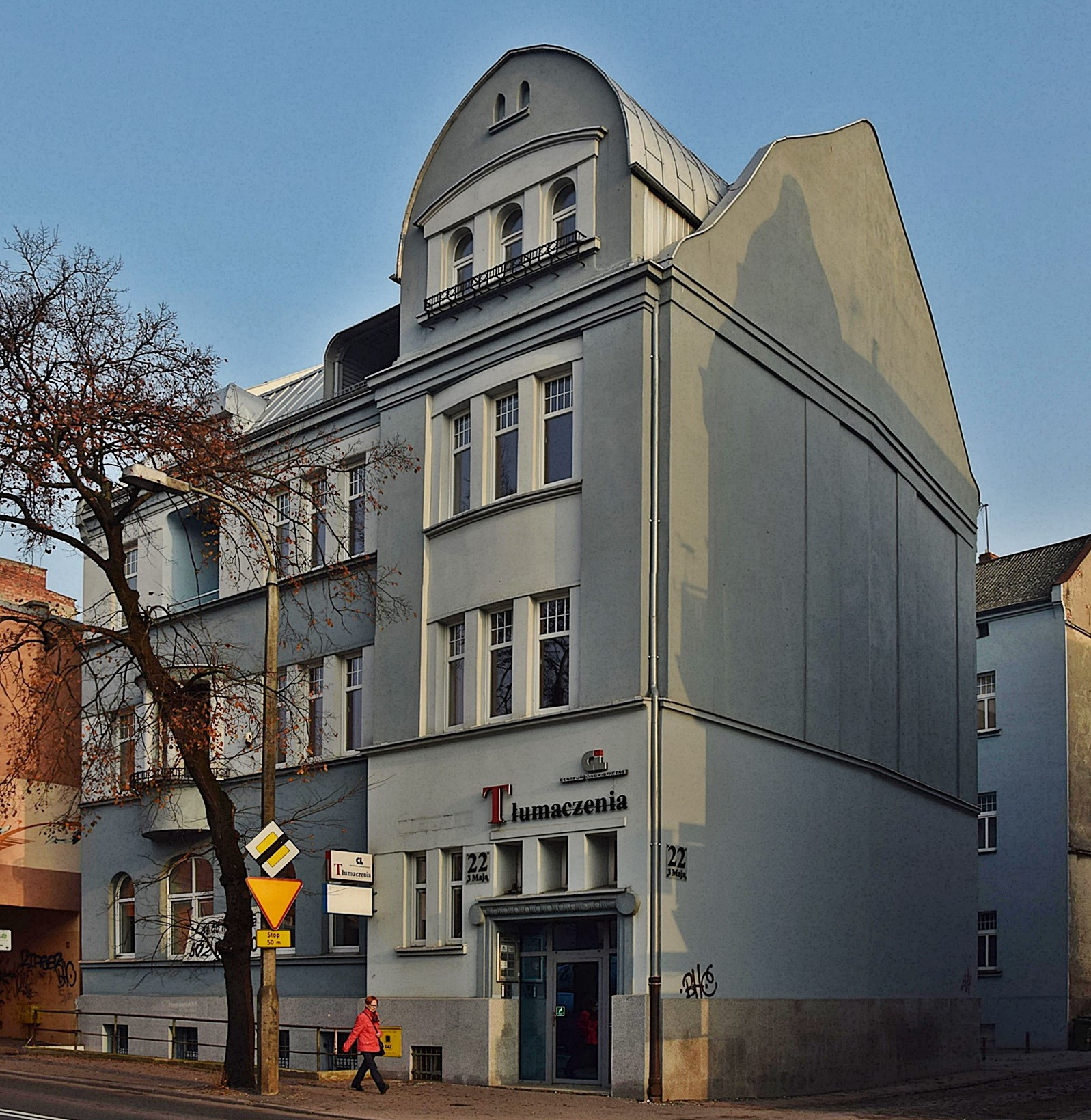
Main elevation

Tenement house at 24

1881

Eclecticism

This building is the oldest tenement preserved in the street: in the early 1880s, the first owner was a teacher, Emil Knobloch.

After several change of caretakers, the tenement was purchased in the fall of 1920 by the newly created (July 1919) Polish Red Cross, to set up a "House for the Blind Soldier" (Polish: Dom Ociemnialego Zolnierza), tending for the numerous Polish citizens visually impaired after WWI. The place was chosen for its farden and its proximity with already existing specialized institutions (across the street and at 9 Staszica street). The first "pupils" arrived at the house (then at "23 Grodztwo") in January 1921. This institution operated till the start of the Second World War.

The neo-classical facade was modified in the 1940s to create a ground floor arcade, similar to what happened to other buildings at that time (today at 2 Focha street or 2 Jagiellońska street).

On a side wall, a mural has been created, entitled "Sportowcy" ("Athletes").

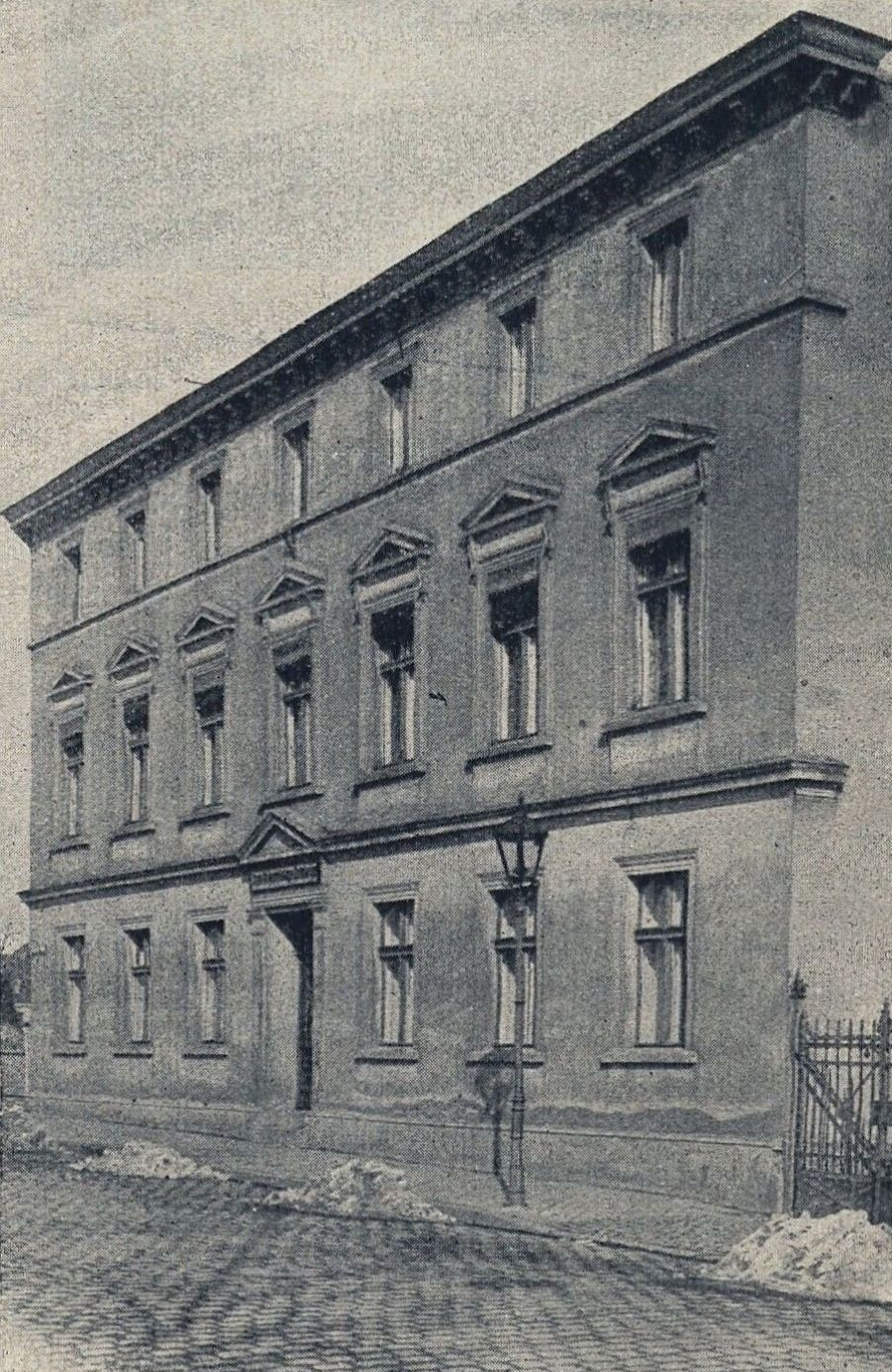
The building in 1927–1929

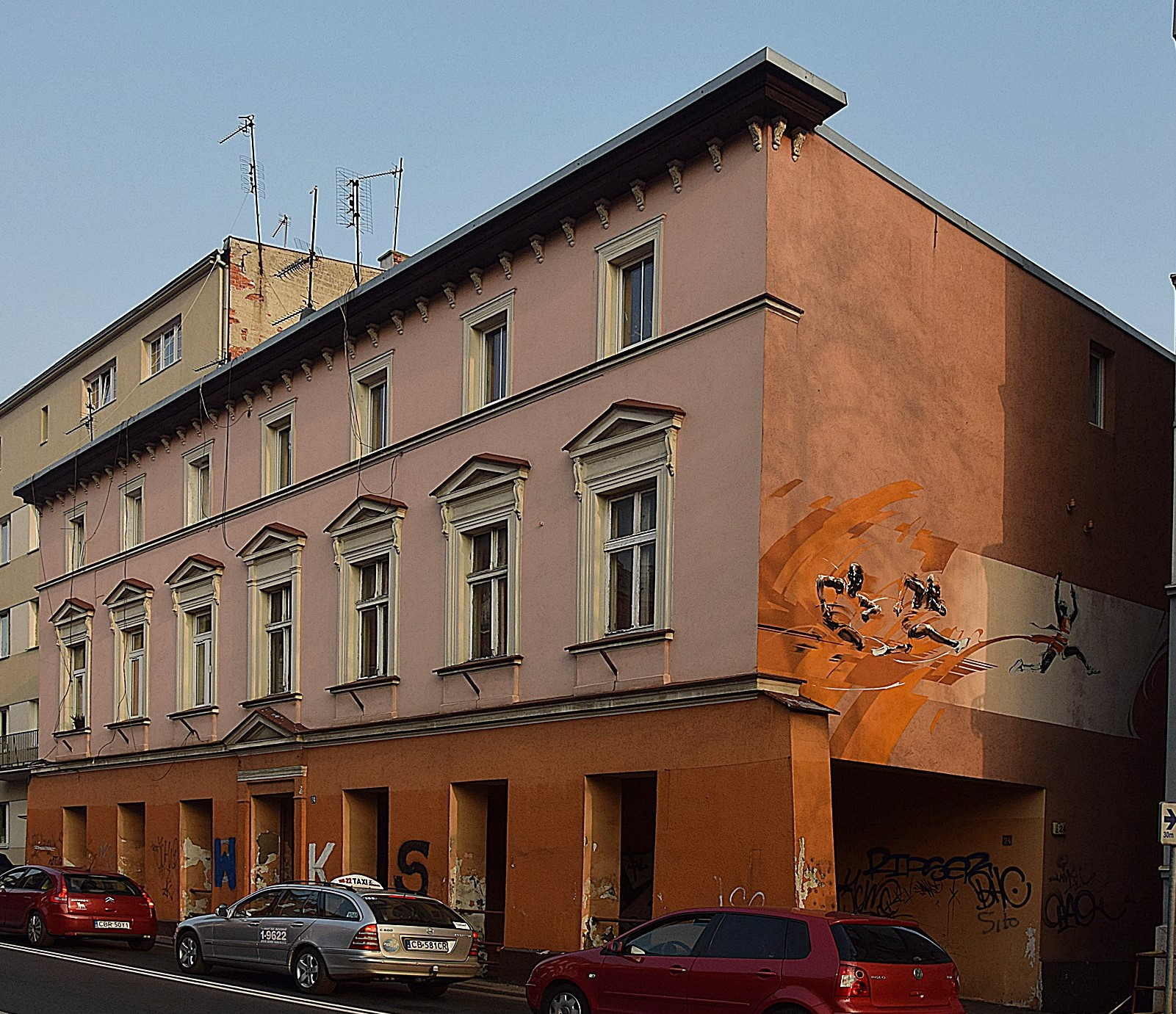
Current view from the street

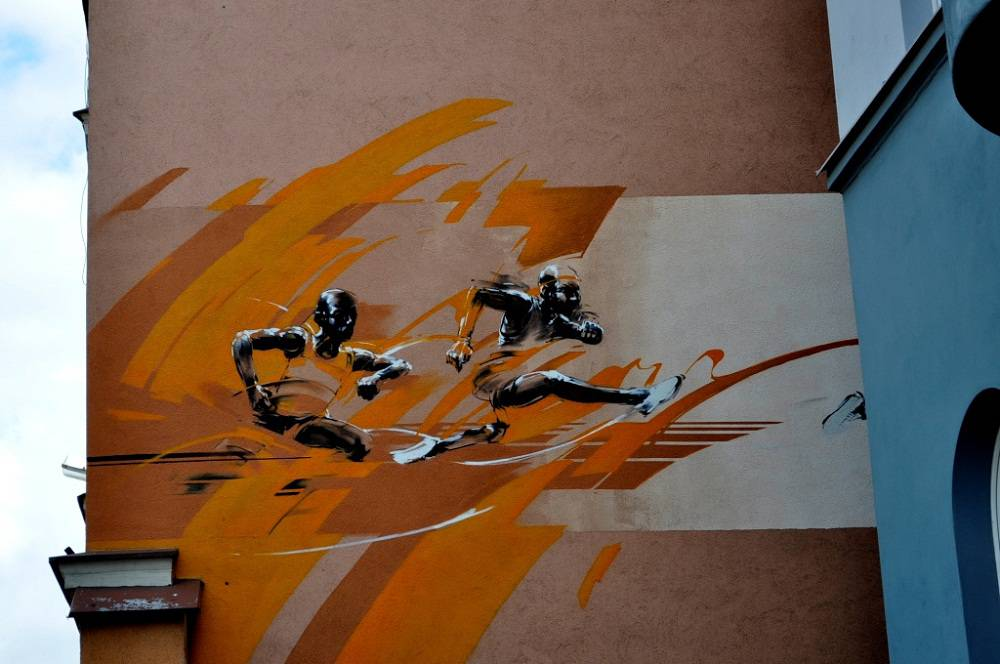
Side wall mural

Tenement house at 26

1937

Modern architecture

T. Böhme is registered as its first owner in 1937.

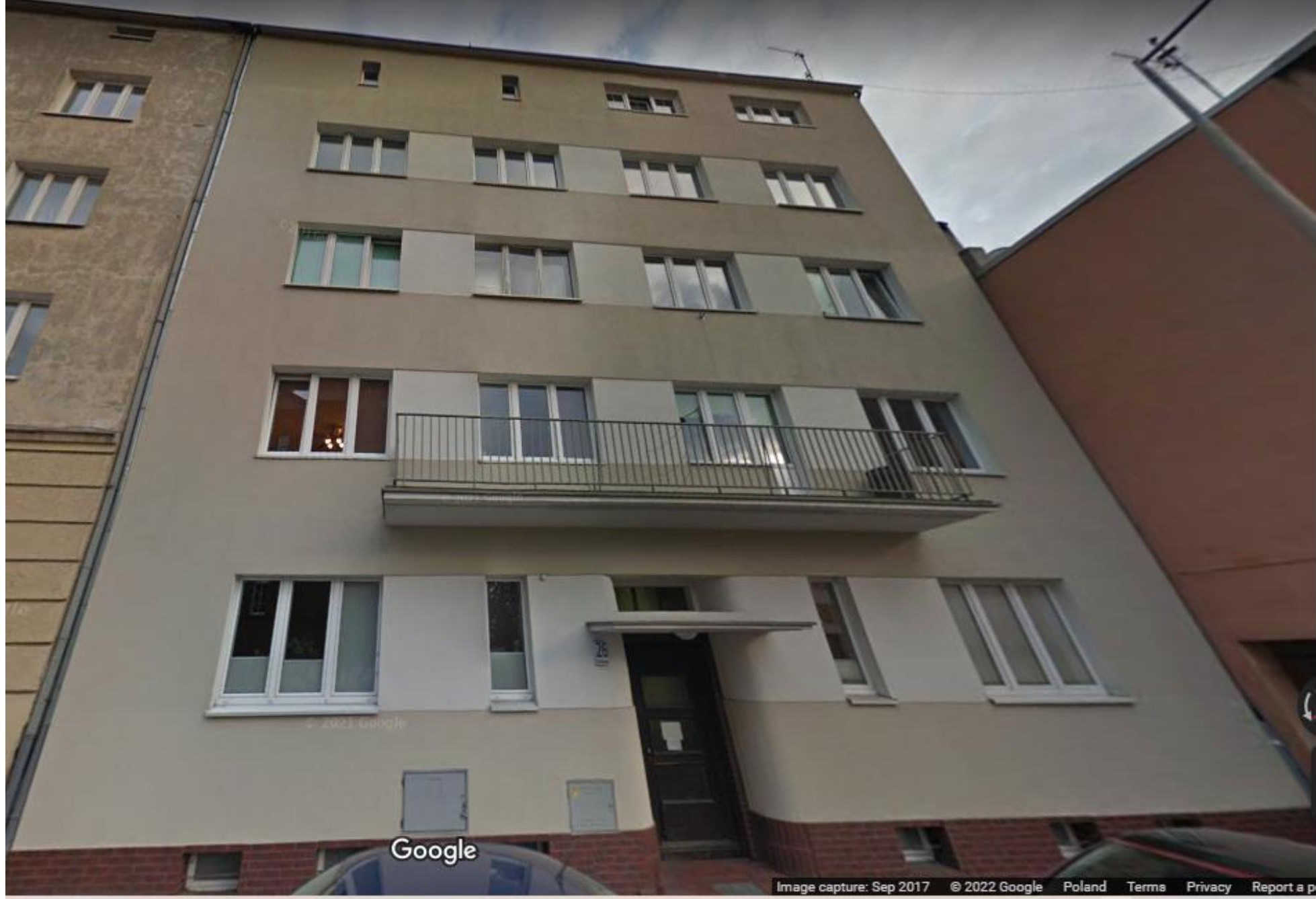
Facade on the street

L. Braille special educational centre for blind children at 10 Krasińskiego street, corner with 3 Maja street

1872 by Fritz Müller

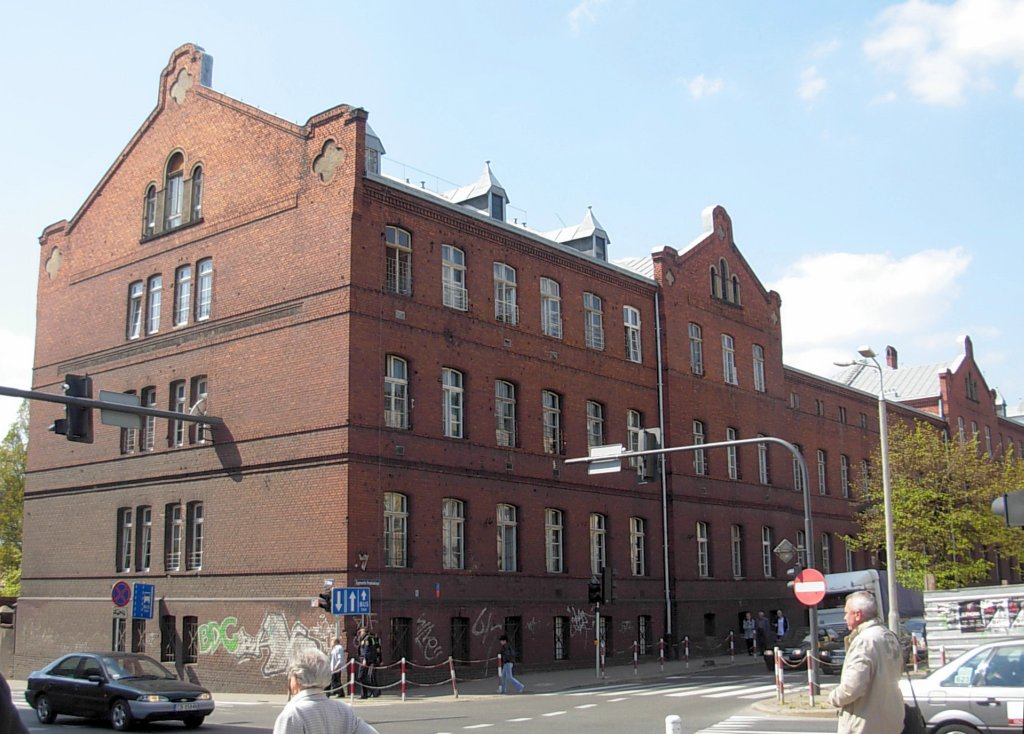
View from the street

Building at 2 Markwarta Street, corner with 3 Maja Street

1939

Modern architecture

The plot was purchased in 1938 by the Association of the military disabled (Polish: Związek Inwalidów Wojennych Rzeczypospolitej - ZIW) and the Association of the Blind Soldiers (Polish: Związek Ociemniałych Żołnierzy - ZOŻ) of the Republic of Poland, from a German citizen, Mr. Bohm. The ground floor had a large hall and three rooms, while the upper storeys were supposed to house wounded blind soldiers and orphans children from fallen military. The opening ceremony never happened, as it was scheduled on September 3, 1939, on the first days of WII. After the war, both associations (ZIW and ZOŻ) were dissolved by the communist authorities in 1950: the edifice was transferred to the State Treasury. It is still owned by the municipal council. On April 23, 1994, a commemorative plaque was placed on the building to remember its initial role.

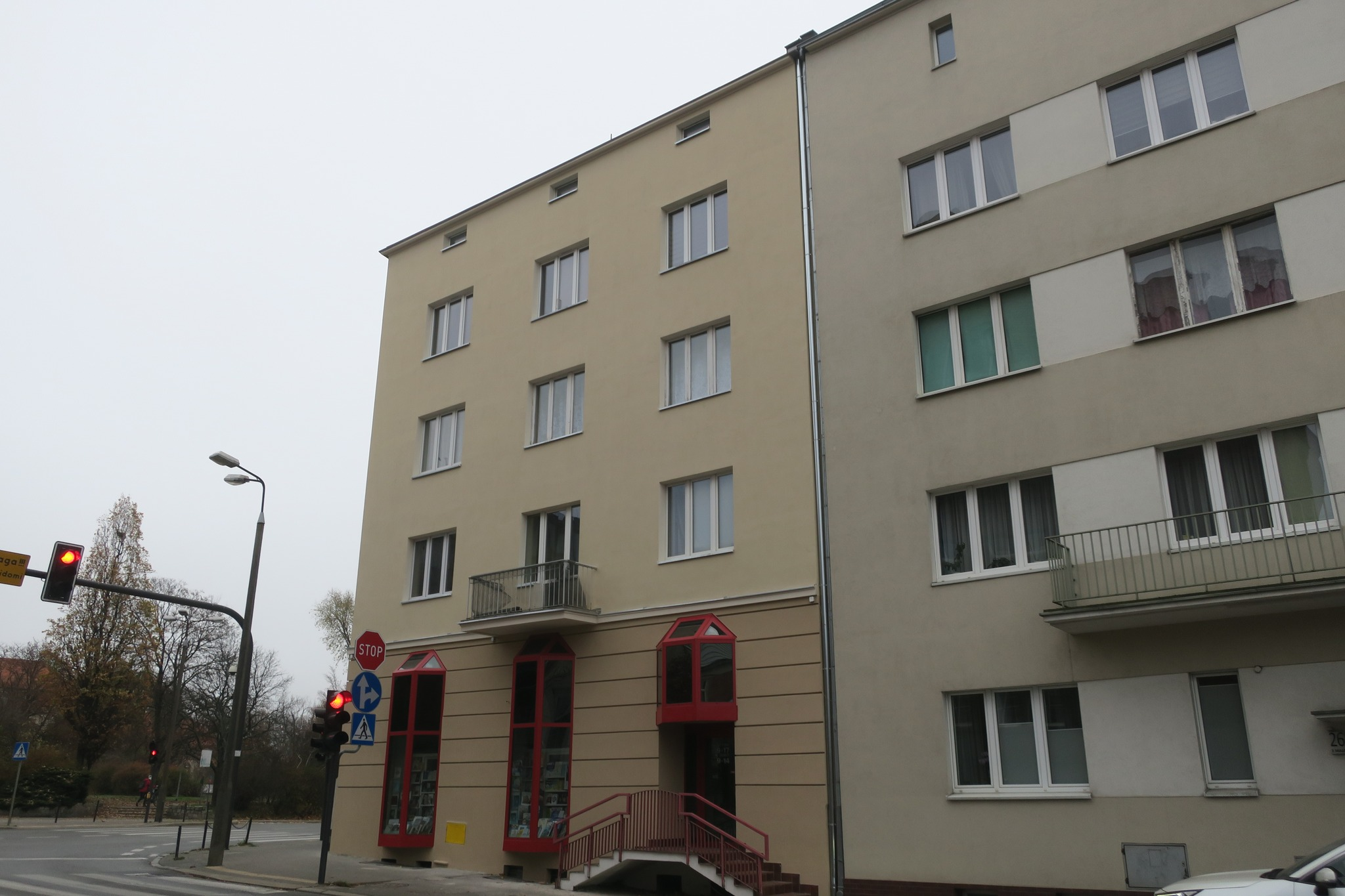
View from Markwarta street
