= Max Zweininger Building =

Tenement Max Zweininger
- Polish: Kamienica Max Zweiningera w Bydgoszczy
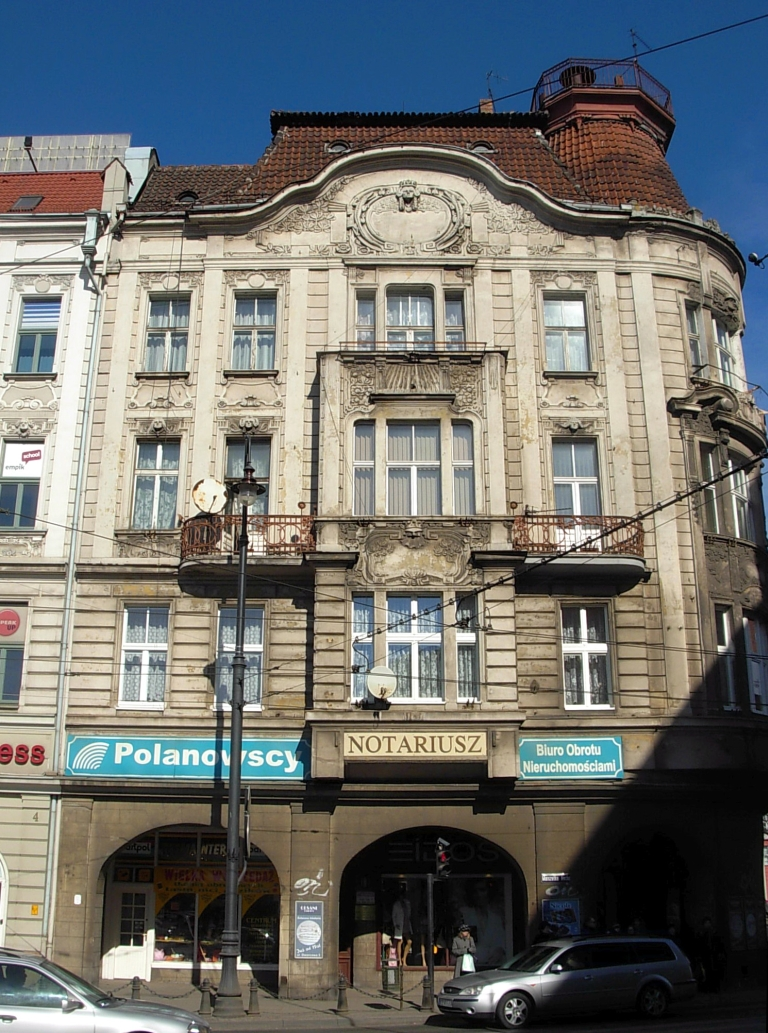
- Southern facade
- Interactive map of the Tenement Max Zweininger area

General information
- Type: Tenement
- Architectural style: Vienna Secession
- Location: Bydgoszcz, Poland, 2 Foch Street
- Coordinates: 53°7′27″N 18°0′7″E
- Construction started: 1901
- Completed: 1902

Technical details
- Floor count: 4

Design and construction
- Architect: Karl Bergner

The Tenement Max Zweininger is a building located in Bydgoszcz at 2 Foch Street, in the corner with Gdańska Street.

== History ==
The house was built between 1901 and 1902 for Max Zweininger, the owner of a famous hat manufactory in Bromberg, located on the square. The building was designed by local architect Karl Bergner on the site of an earlier building from the first half of the 19th century. On the ground floor were established shops, including hats and furs retailers.

In 1910–1911, Max Zweininger had his own department store built by Fritz Weidner, one of the leading architects in Bydgoszcz. The building still stands today at 4 Theater Square.

During interwar period a confectionery shop took the place of the composition of a cigars maker workshop.

In 1940, a ground floor arcade has been added, designed by Jan Kossowski, who also built the Monument on Freedom Square.

== Architecture ==
The building has a rich ornamental decoration facade and is a symbolic example of the Art Nouveau style in the city. Bas-reliefs portrays in particular:

- a sleeping figure
- Flower motifs
- Crowned faces

Balconies are associated with ornamented wrought railings.

== Gallery ==
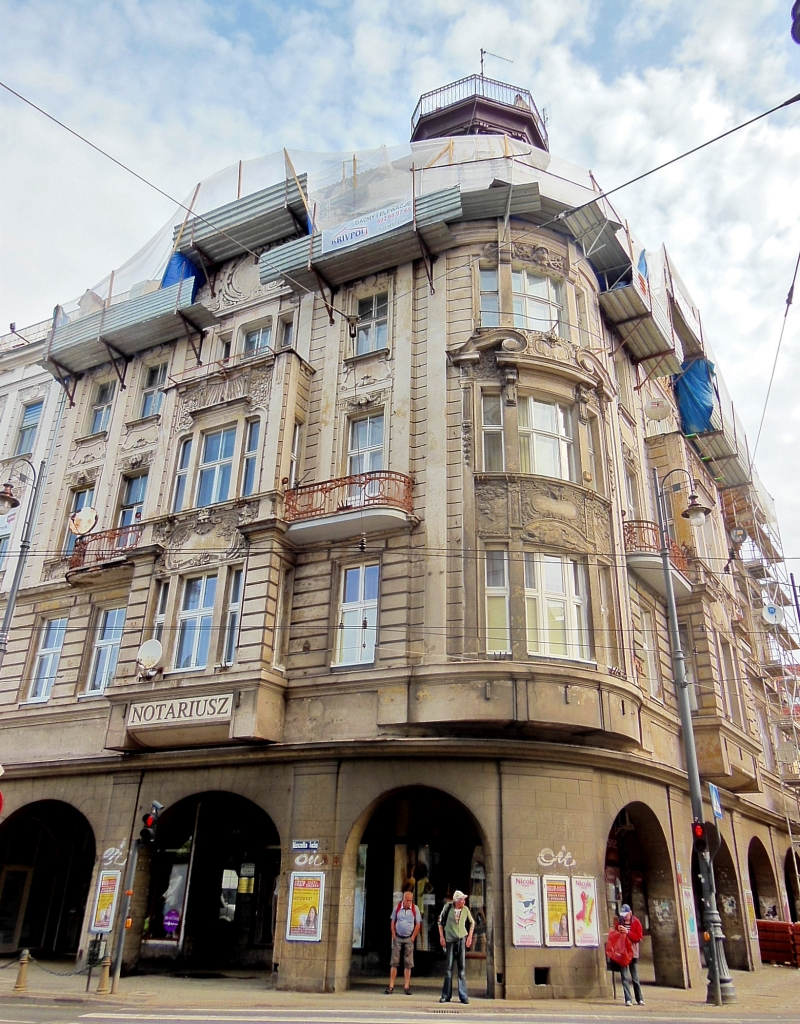
View from Jagielloński Street

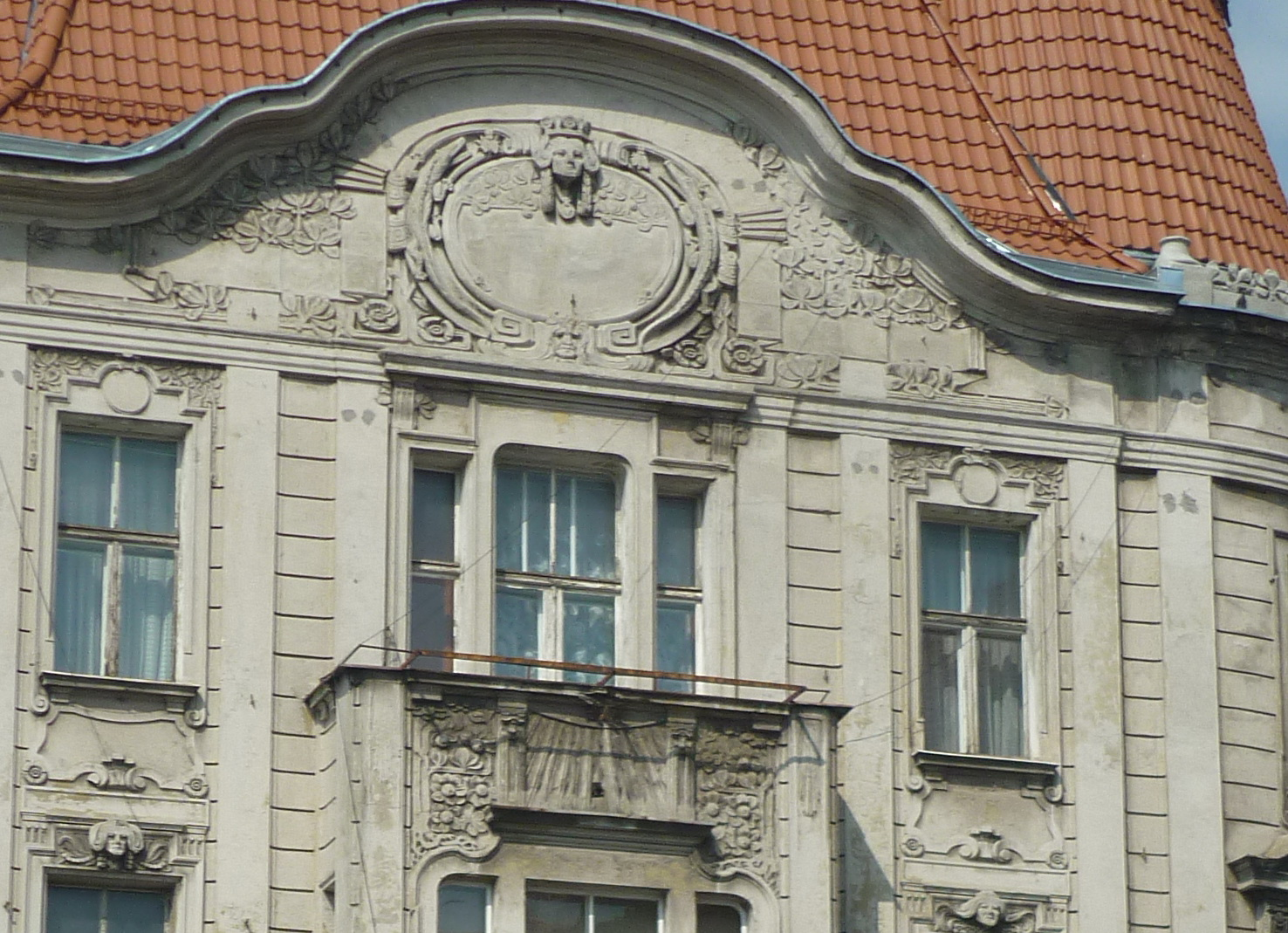
Tenement details

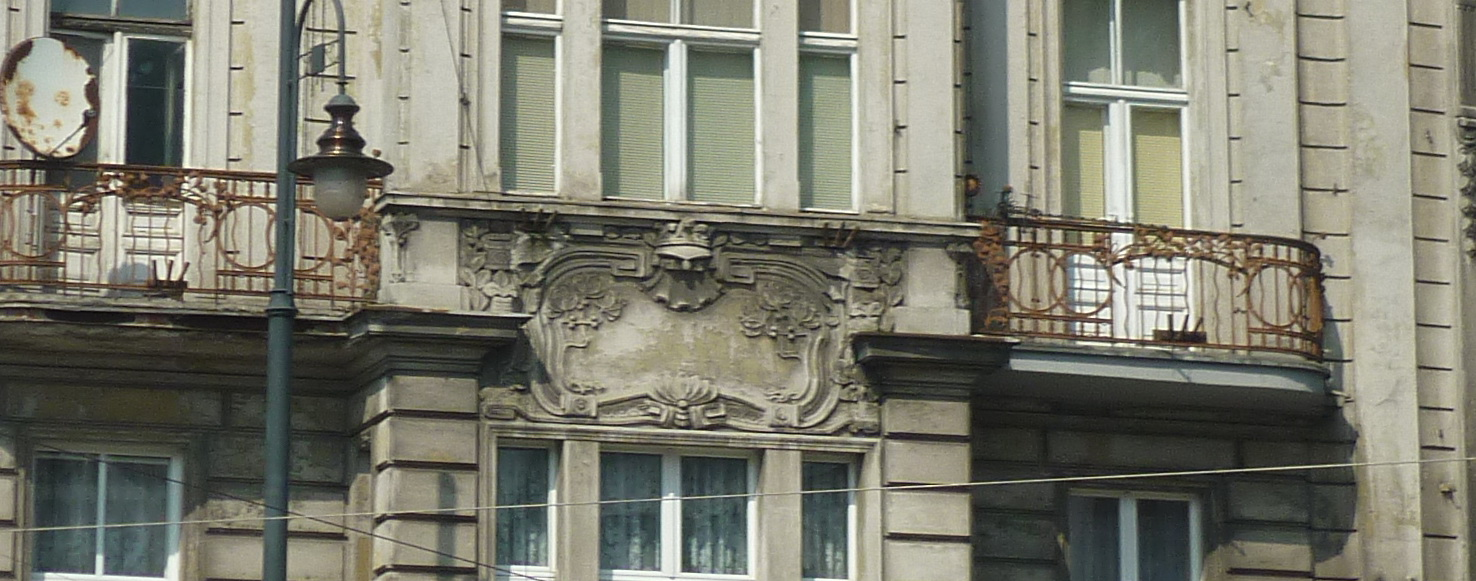
Detail of a balcony

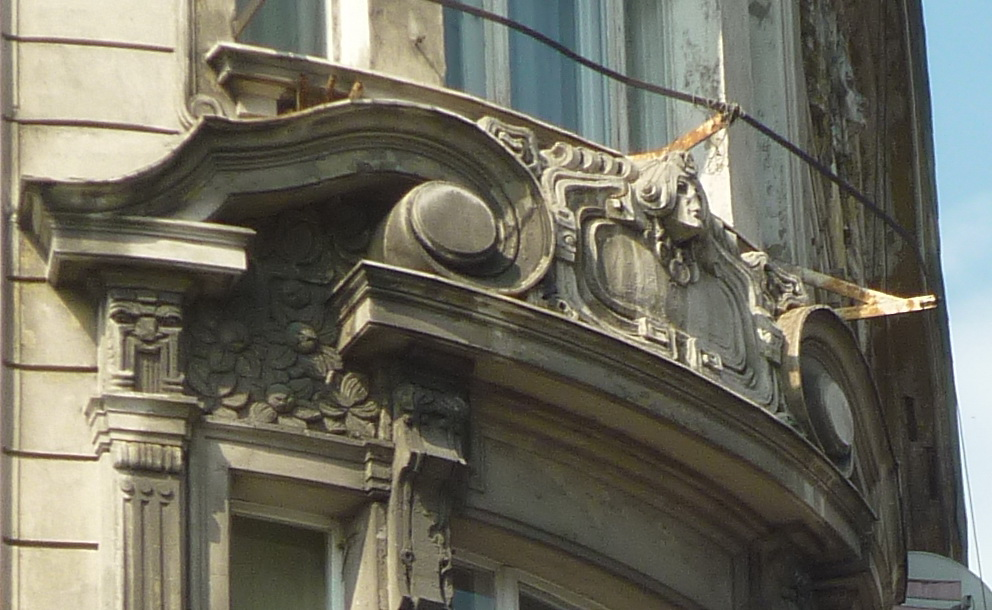
Tenement Max Zweininger facade detail

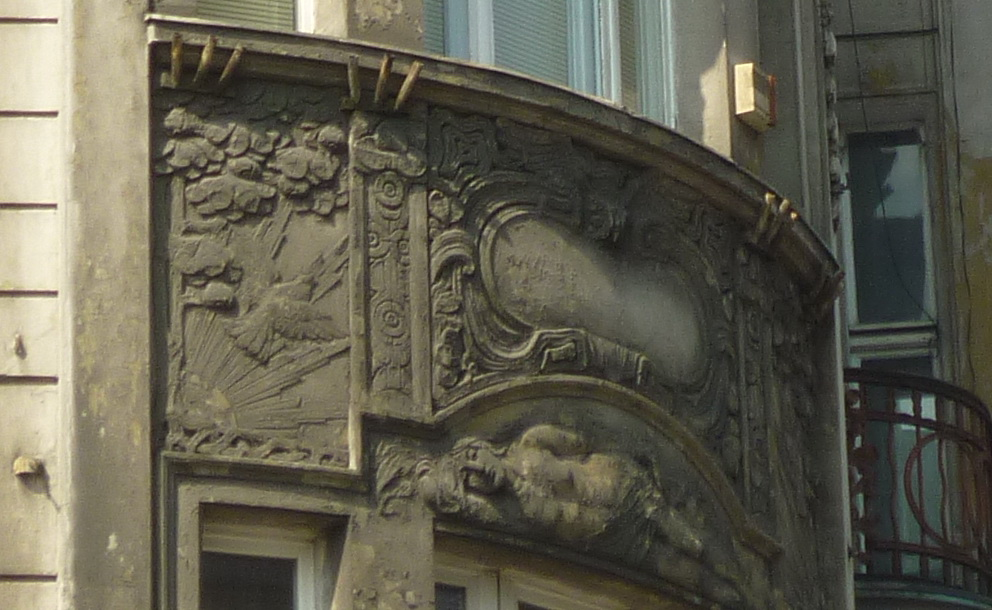
Detail of the sleeping figure

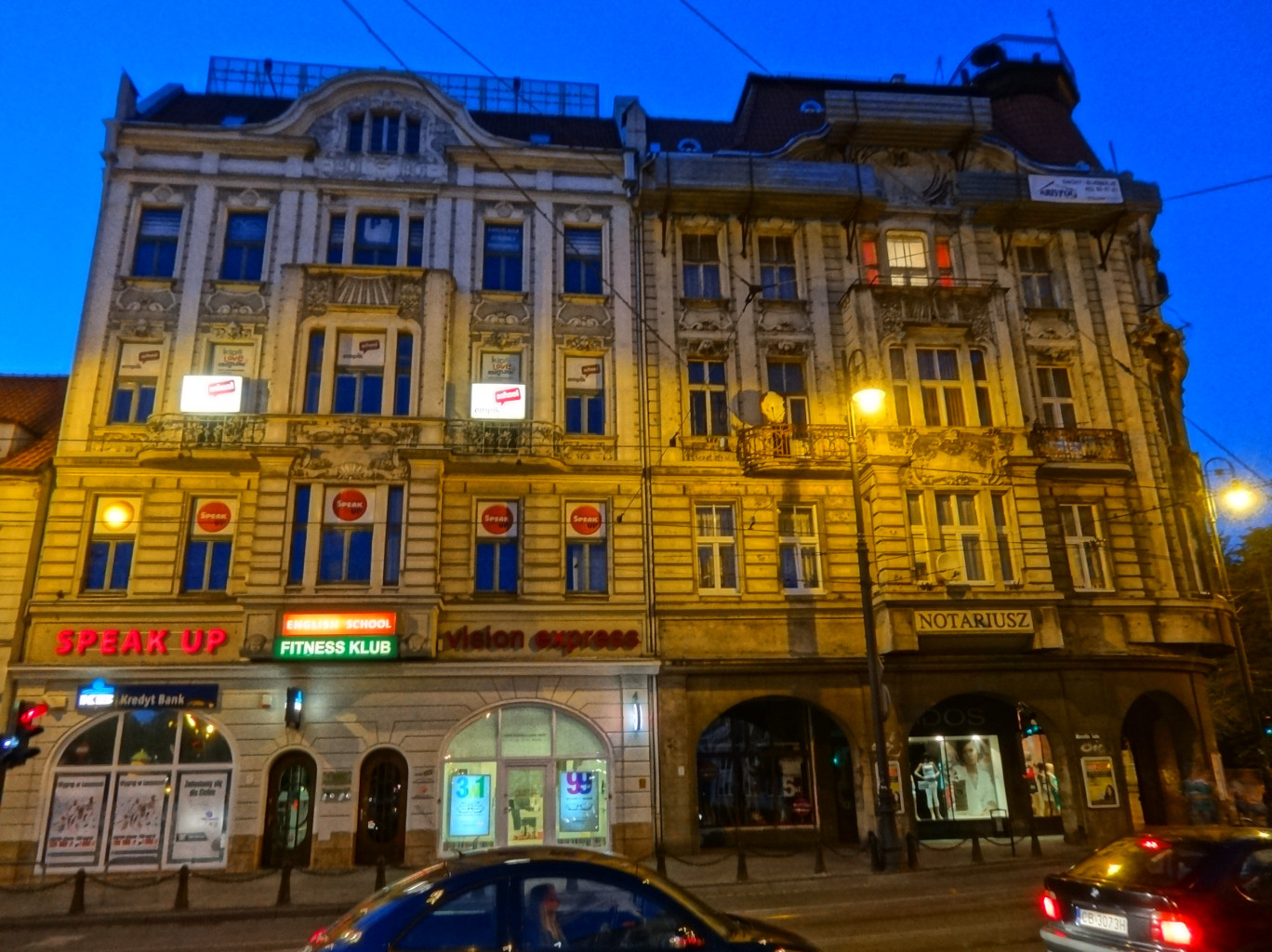
By Night

== See also ==
- Bydgoszcz
- Gdanska Street in Bydgoszcz
- Marshal Ferdinand Foch Street in Bydgoszcz
- Karl Bergner

== Bibliography ==
- (in Polish) Bręczewska-Kulesza Daria, Derkowska-Kostkowska Bogna, Wysocka A. (2003). Ulica Gdańska. Przewodnik historyczny. Bydgoszcz: Wojewódzki Ośrodek Kultury w Bydgoszczy. ISBN 9788386970100.
