= Stanisław Miaskowski Tenement =

- Polish: Kamienica Stanisława Miaskowskiego
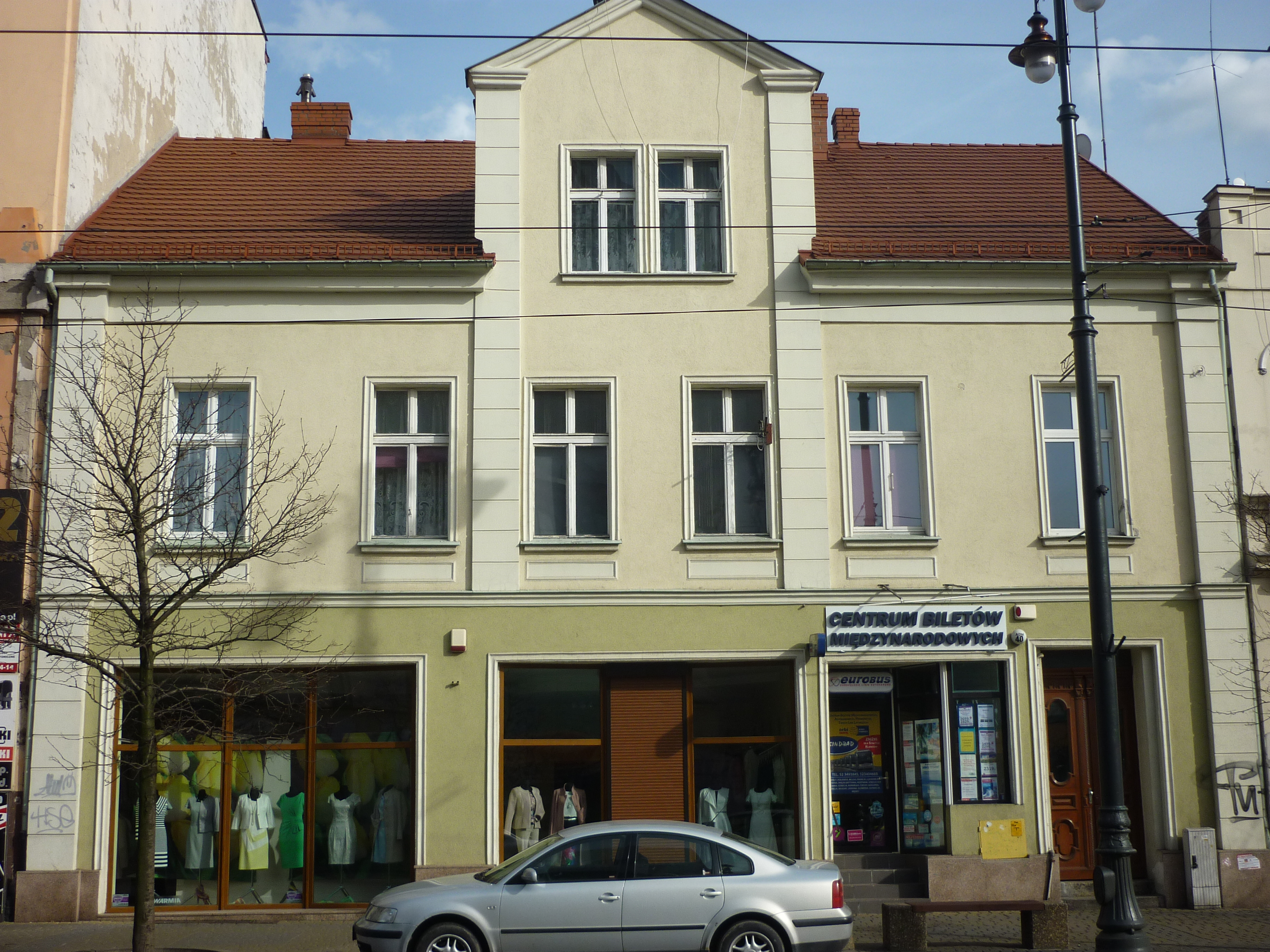
- View from Gdańska Street

General information
- Type: Villa
- Location: 40 Gdańska Street, Bydgoszcz, Poland, Poland
- Coordinates: 53°7′44″N 18°0′25″E
- Completed: 1852
- Client: Stanisław Miaskowski

Technical details
- Floor count: 5

Design and construction
- Architect: Trieb

Stanisław Miaskowski Tenement is a historic house located at 40 Gdańska Street, in downtown Bydgoszcz, Poland.

== Location ==
The building stands on the eastern side of Gdańska Street, between Krasinski and Słowackiego streets. It is adjacent to the Max Rosenthal tenement, another historical building in Bydgoszcz.

== History ==
The house was built in 1852 for Stanisław Von Miaskowski, an art dealer. At this time, the street was not the present thoroughfare: the address of the house was Danziger Chaussee 10, Bromberg: Bydgoszcz was then part of northern Prussia.

In the 1880s, Von Miaskowski began renting out the building. During this same time the avenue took the name of Danzigerstraße, thus signifying its growing importance in the city network.

== Architecture ==
This building is one of the oldest preserved in its original form on Gdańska Street, dating back from the mid-19th century.

In the backyard of the house is growing a 150 year old yew tree, one of the oldest in the city.

== See also ==
- Bydgoszcz
- Gdanska Street in Bydgoszcz
- (in Polish) Downtown district in Bydgoszcz

== Bibliography ==
- (in Polish) Bręczewska-Kulesza Daria, Derkowska-Kostkowska Bogna, Wysocka A. (2003). Ulica Gdańska. Przewodnik historyczny. Bydgoszcz: Wojewódzki Ośrodek Kultury w Bydgoszczy. ISBN 9788386970100.
