= Max Rosenthal Tenement =

- Kamienica Maxa Rosenthala w Bydgoszczy
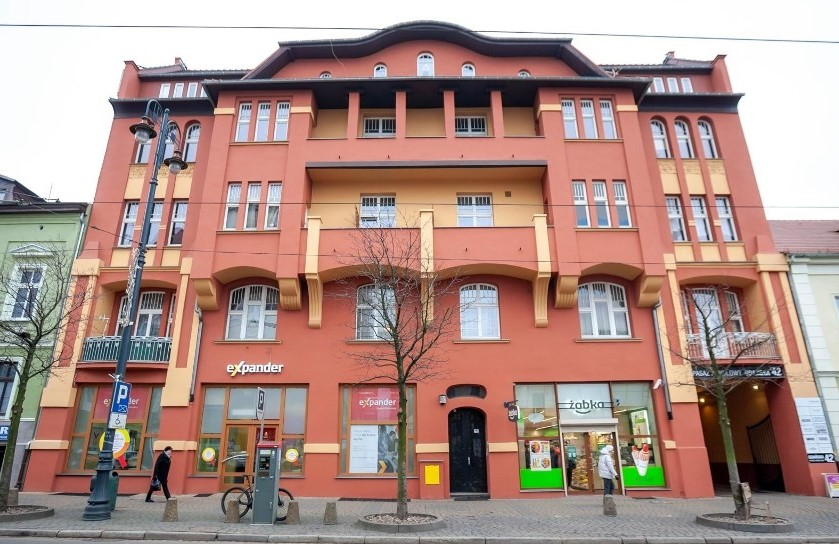
- View from Gdańska Street
- Interactive map of the Max Rosenthal Tenement area

General information
- Type: Tenement
- Architectural style: German historicism
- Classification: Nr.601299-Reg.A/1059, August 26, 1996
- Location: 42 Gdańska street, Bydgoszcz, Poland, Poland
- Coordinates: 53°7′45″N 18°0′26″E
- Construction started: 1905
- Completed: 1906
- Client: Max Rosenthal

Technical details
- Floor count: 5

Design and construction
- Architect: Fritz Weidner

Max Rosenthal House is a historical tenement located at 42 Gdańska Street in downtown Bydgoszcz, Poland, built when the city was part of the Kingdom of Prussia. It is registered on the Kuyavian-Pomeranian Voivodeship Heritage List.

== Location ==
The building stands on the eastern side of the street, between Krasiński and Słowackiego streets. It is adjacent to the Stanisław Miaskowski house.

== History ==
The building was constructed between 1905 and 1906 on the site of a previous house dating from 1874. At this time, the address was 149 Danziger Strasse, Bromberg. It was designed by the architect Fritz Weidner, following a commission from the shipping investor (German: Spediteur) Max Rosenthal. The first tenant was Friedrich Herzer, who ran a men's fashion salon offering elegant clothing, uniforms and sportswear until World War I.

A notable doctor, Elmiar Schendell, lived there from the 1910s to the 1930s. During First World War, he gave nursing courses to young mother at the Infant Dispensary on Kościelecki Square.

Fritz Weidner was a German builder who came to Bydgoszcz at the end of the 19th century. He conducted frantic building activity in the city between 1896 and 1914. From 1912, he lived in the house he built for himself at 34 Gdańska.

In the same area, Fritz Weidner built houses at the following addresses:

- Mix Ernst tenement and movie theatre at 10 Gdanska St. in 1905;
- Thomas Frankowski Tenement at 28 Gdanska St. in 1897;
- George Sikorski Tenement at 31 Gdańska St. in 1906;
- Ernst Bartsch tenement at 79 Gdańska St. in 1898;
- House at 3 Freedom Square in 1903.

In 1918, the merchant Bronisław Kentzer bought the tenement to set up there the "Colonial Goods Wholesale and Coffee Roaster B. Kentzer i Ska" (Polish: Hurtownia Towarów Kolonianych i Palarnia Kawy B. Kentzer i Ska). The firm became one of the largest trading companies in Pomerania and Greater Poland.

End of 2017, a thorough refurbishment of the building has anew underlined the features of the elevation on Gdańska street.

== Architecture ==
The tenement at the time reflected the new artistic trends in architecture during the first decade of the 20th century in Germany, where the stucco decoration is reduced to a minimum, leaving room for the system of architectural elements that make up the facade.

The tone of the facade underlines the pair of gallery-connected balconies, supported by massive corbels. The whole is crowned with a broken-semicircular mansard roof.

The interiors have still preserved stoves, staircases, glass elevators and stained glass windows.

The building has been put on the Pomeranian heritage list (Nr.601299-Reg.A/1059), on 26 August 1996.

== Gallery ==
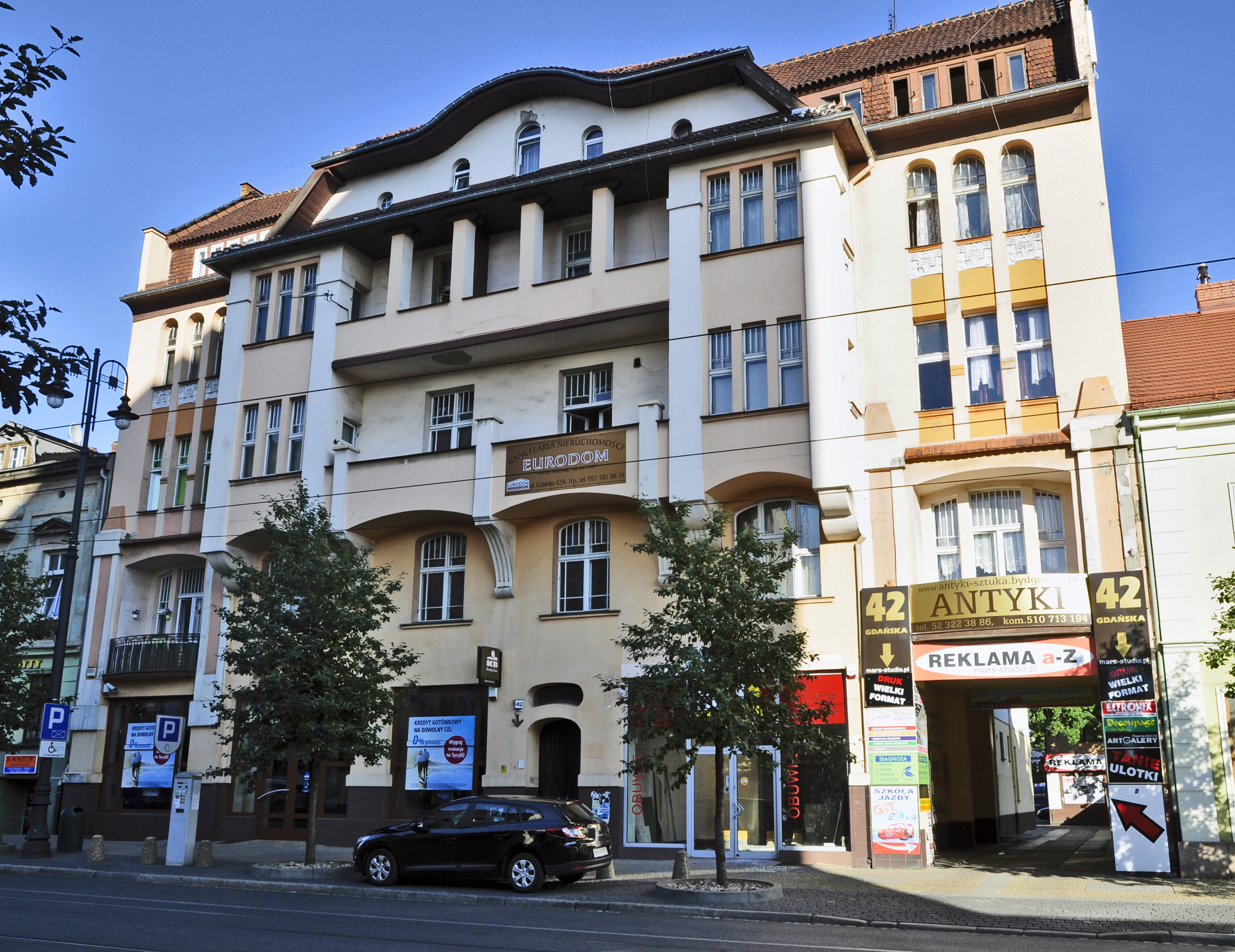
View from Gdanska street

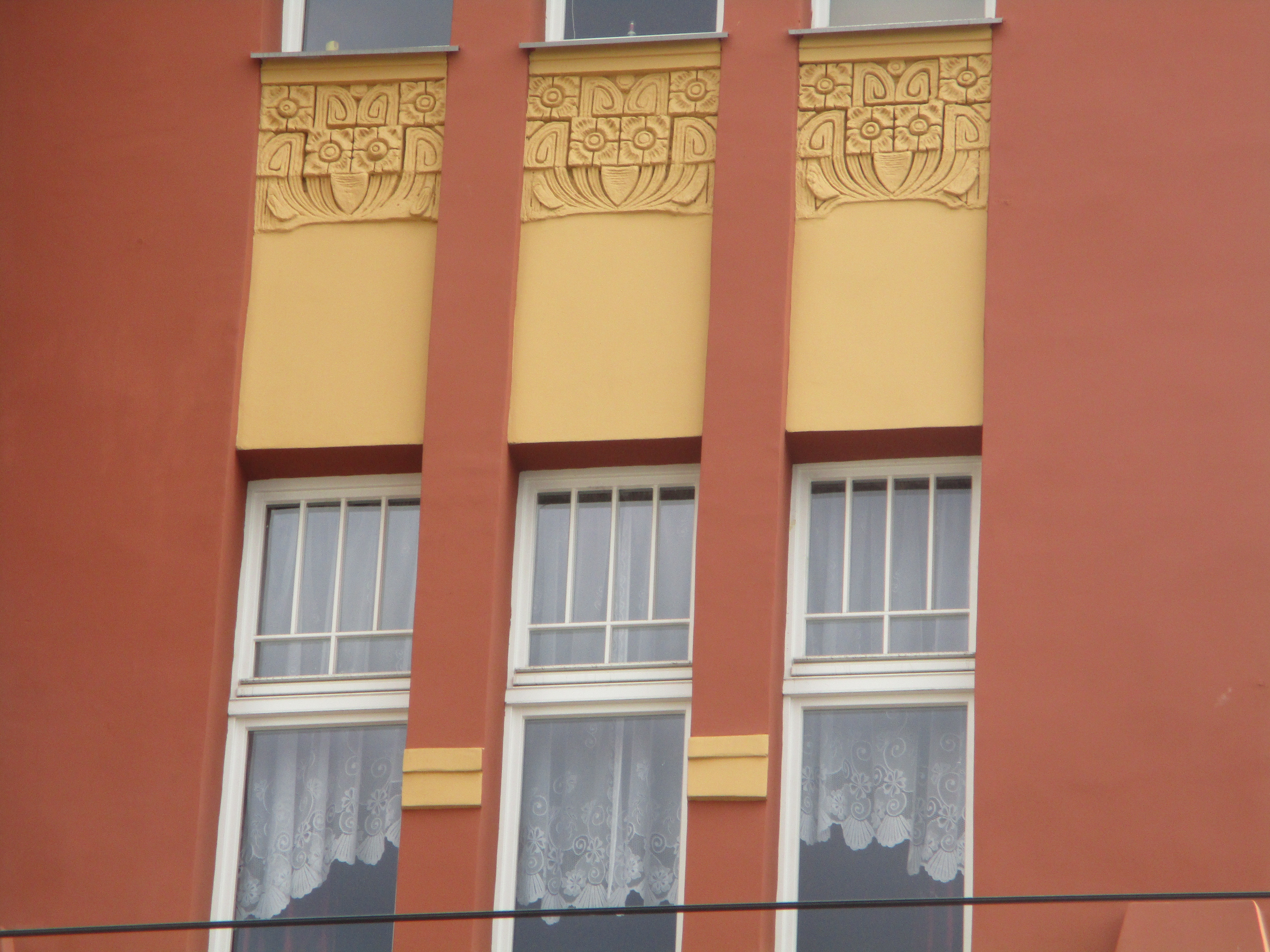
Detail of a facade adornement

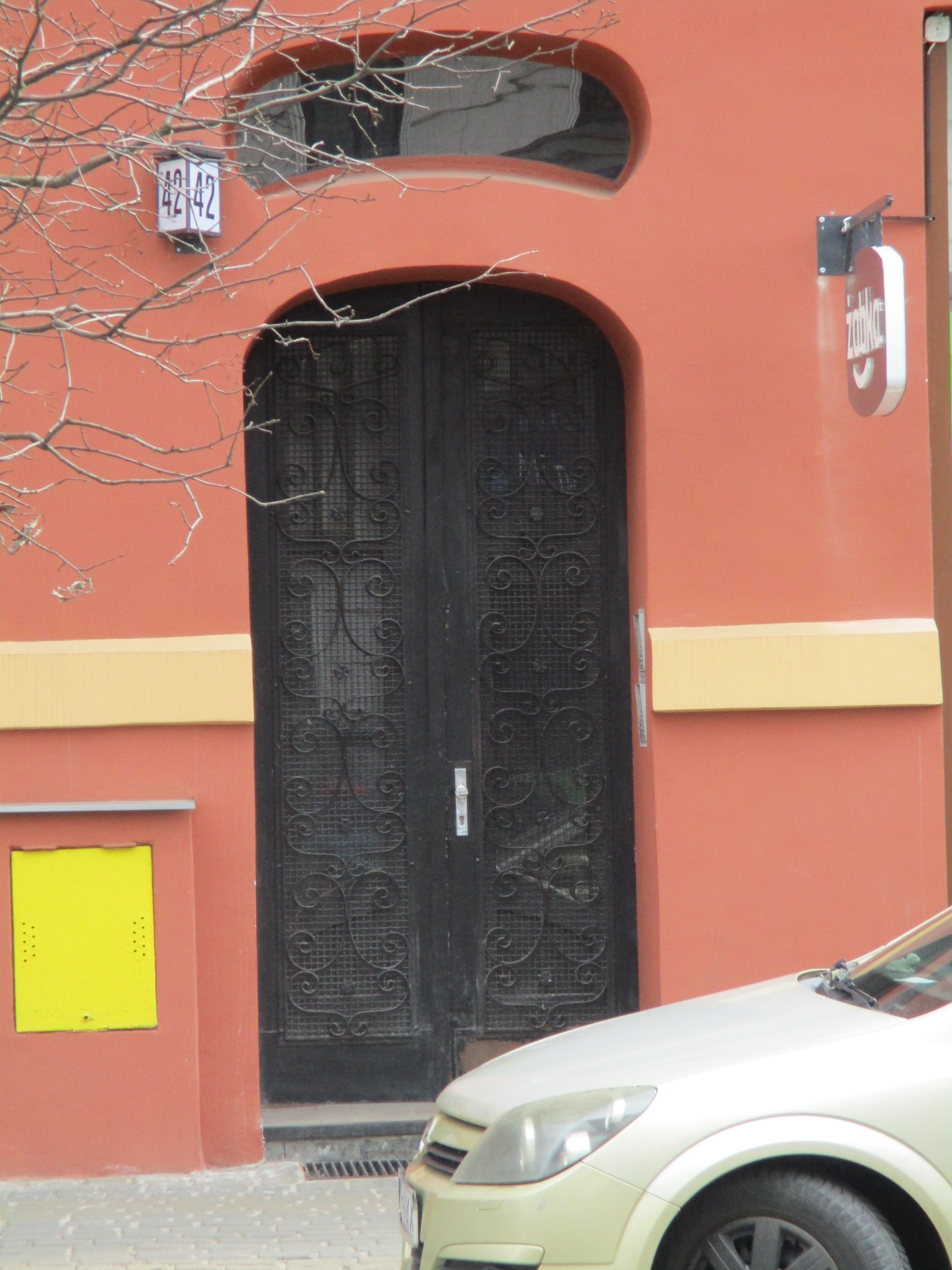
Main door on the street

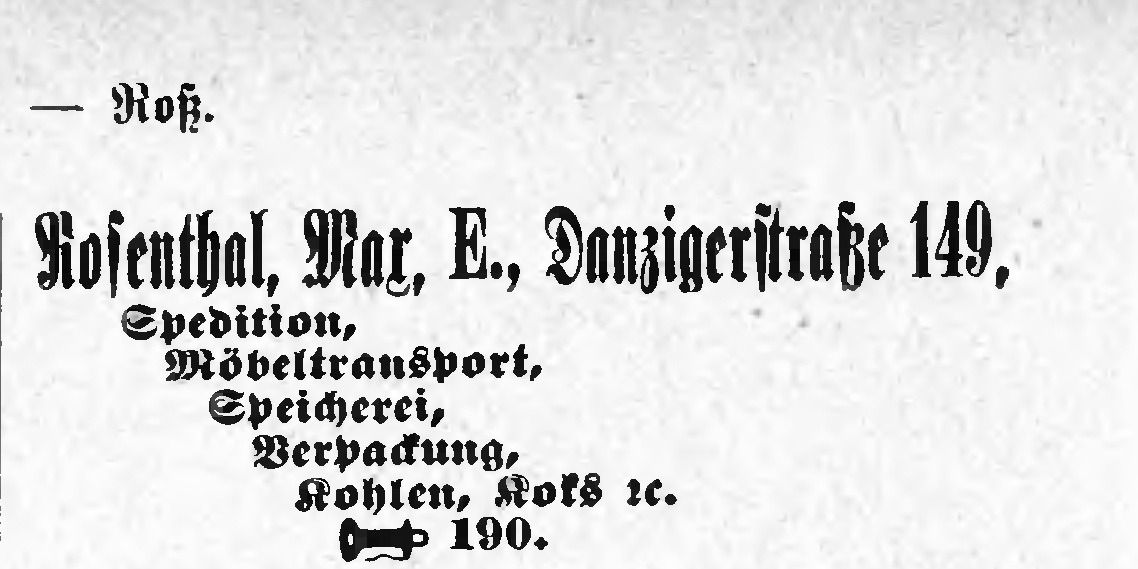
Advertisement For Max Rosenthal in Bromberg

== See also ==
- Gdanska Street in Bydgoszcz
- Kościelecki Square in Bydgoszcz
- Zygmunt Krasiński Street in Bydgoszcz
- Słowackiego Street in Bydgoszcz
- Fritz Weidner
- (in Polish) Downtown district in Bydgoszcz

== Bibliography ==
- Bręczewska-Kulesza Daria, Derkowska-Kostkowska Bogna, Wysocka A. (2003). Ulica Gdańska. Przewodnik historyczny. Bydgoszcz: Wojewódzki Ośrodek Kultury w Bydgoszczy. ISBN 9788386970100.
