= Zygmunt Krasiński Street, Bydgoszcz =

Street in Bydgoszcz, Poland

Coordinates: 53.07°N 18.00°E

Zygmunt Krasiński Street
Bydgoszcz
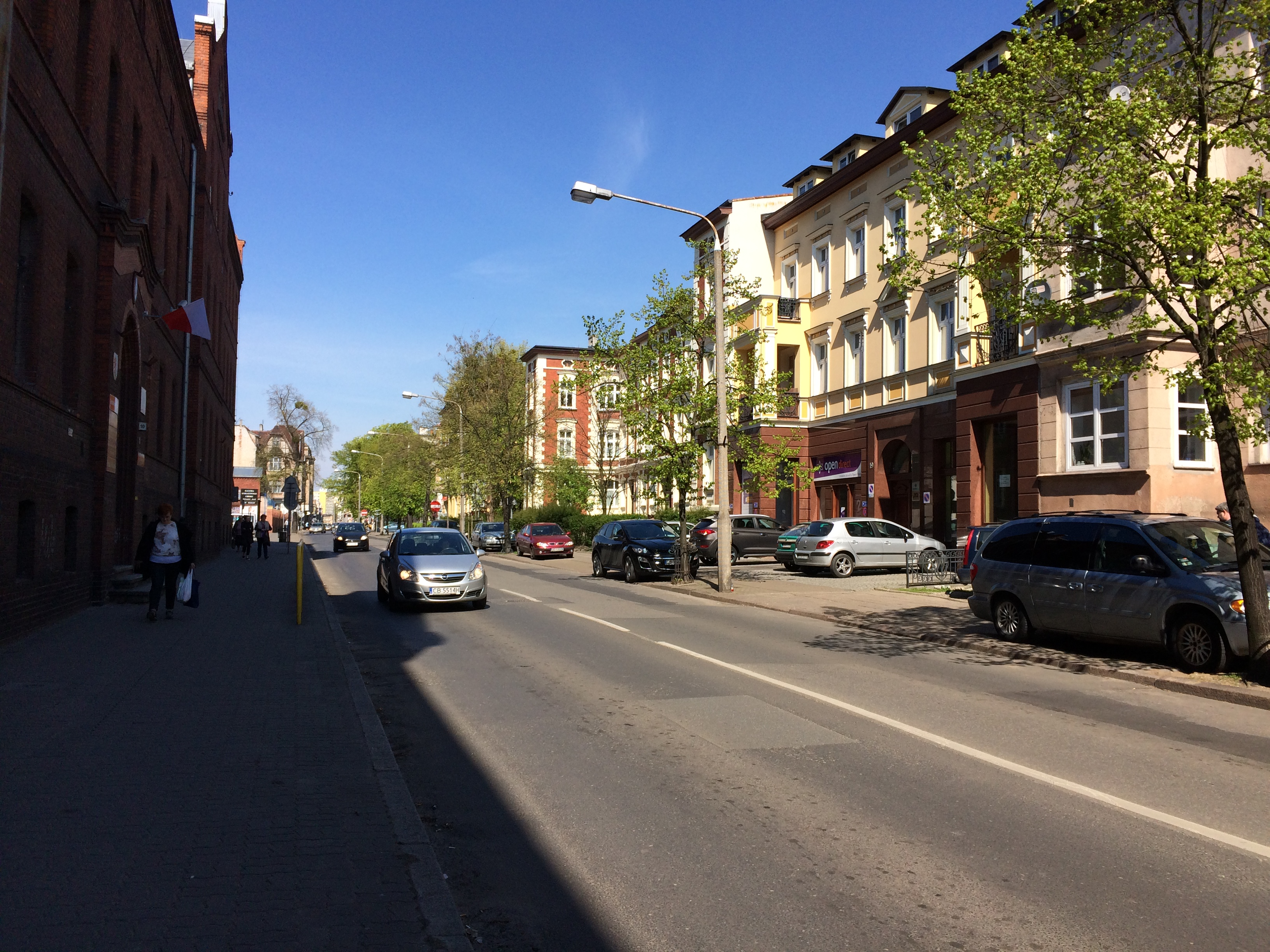
- View of the street

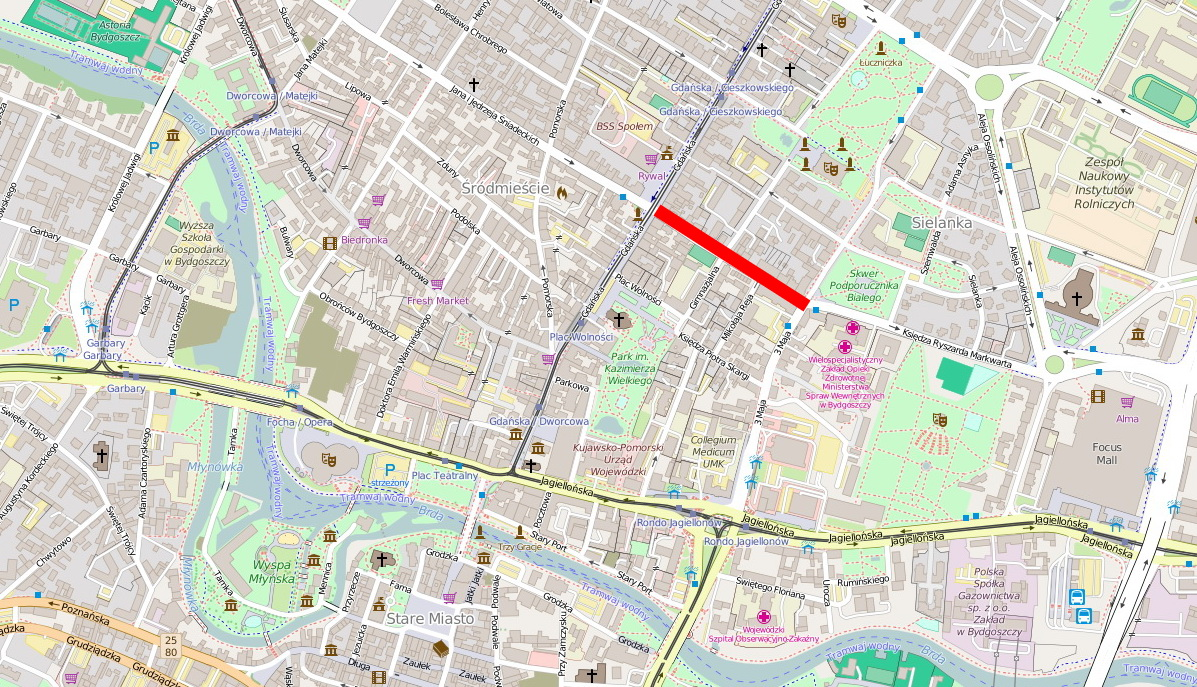
- Location of Krasiński Street
- Native name: Ulica Zygmunta Krasińskego (Polish)
- Former name: Frönerstraße
- Namesake: Zygmunt Krasiński
- Owner: City of Bydgoszcz
- Length: 300 m (980 ft); Google maps
- Area: Downtown district
- Location: Bydgoszcz, Poland

Construction
- Construction start: End of 19th century.
- Completed: 1908

Zygmunt Krasiński Street or Krasińskiego Street is an avenue of Bydgoszcz, in downtown district (Polish: Śródmieście).

== Location ==
Śniadecki Street is oriented east–west and provides a link between Gdańska Street, Bydgoszcz in the west and May 3rd street to the west. It is the continuation of Śniadecki street east of Gdańska Street. It crosses Gimnazjalna and Libelta streets and ends at Leszek the White Square .

== Appellation ==
Through history, this street had the following names:

- Until 1920, Frönerstraße;
- 1920–1939, Zygmunt Krasiński Street;
- 1939–1945, Frönerstraße;
- since 1945, Zygmunt Krasiński Street.

Current patron of the street is Zygmunt Krasiński (1812– 1859), a Polish nobleman traditionally associated with Adam Mickiewicz and Juliusz Słowacki as one of Poland's great Romantic poets who influenced national consciousness during the period of Poland's political bondage.

== History ==
The street is not mentioned on maps before the second half of the 19th century. In 1876, a map by Paul Berthold Jaekel features a start of a west–east oriented axis in the vicinity of today's N0.10, without interception of Gdańska street to the west.

In 1900, Fröhnerstraße is displayed on a city map, starting at Danzigerstraße in the west and ending at Hempelstraße to the east, where land is not urbanized yet. On this map, the only building mentioned is at Nr.10 (House for blind children - German: Blinden-Anstalt).

In 1908, a physical education hall (German: Gymn-Turnhalle) is referred to on a map at Nr.7.

== Main edifices ==
Oskar Ewald Tenement, at 30 Gdańska Street, corner with Krasiński Street

1895–1896, by Józef Święcicki

Eclecticism

The top floor housed originally Oskar Ewald's photographic studio.

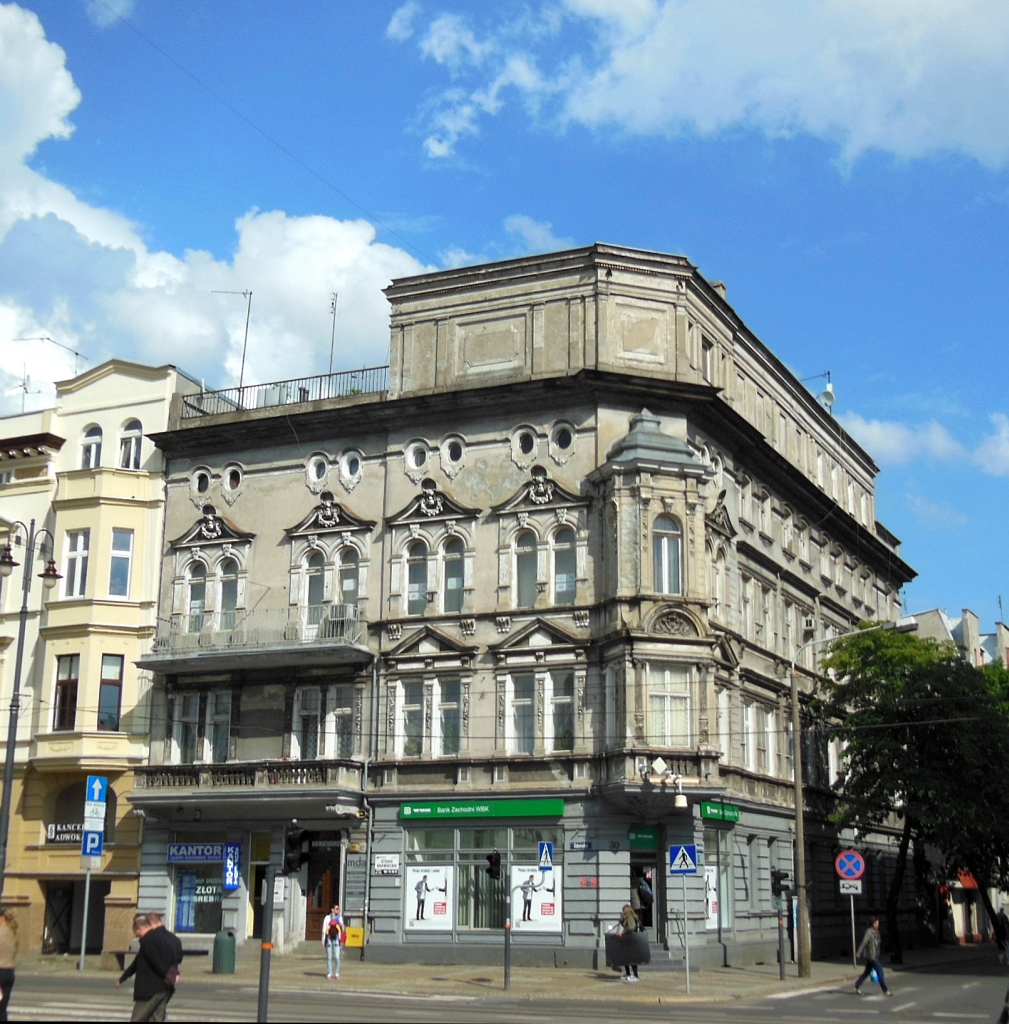
View from Gdańska Street

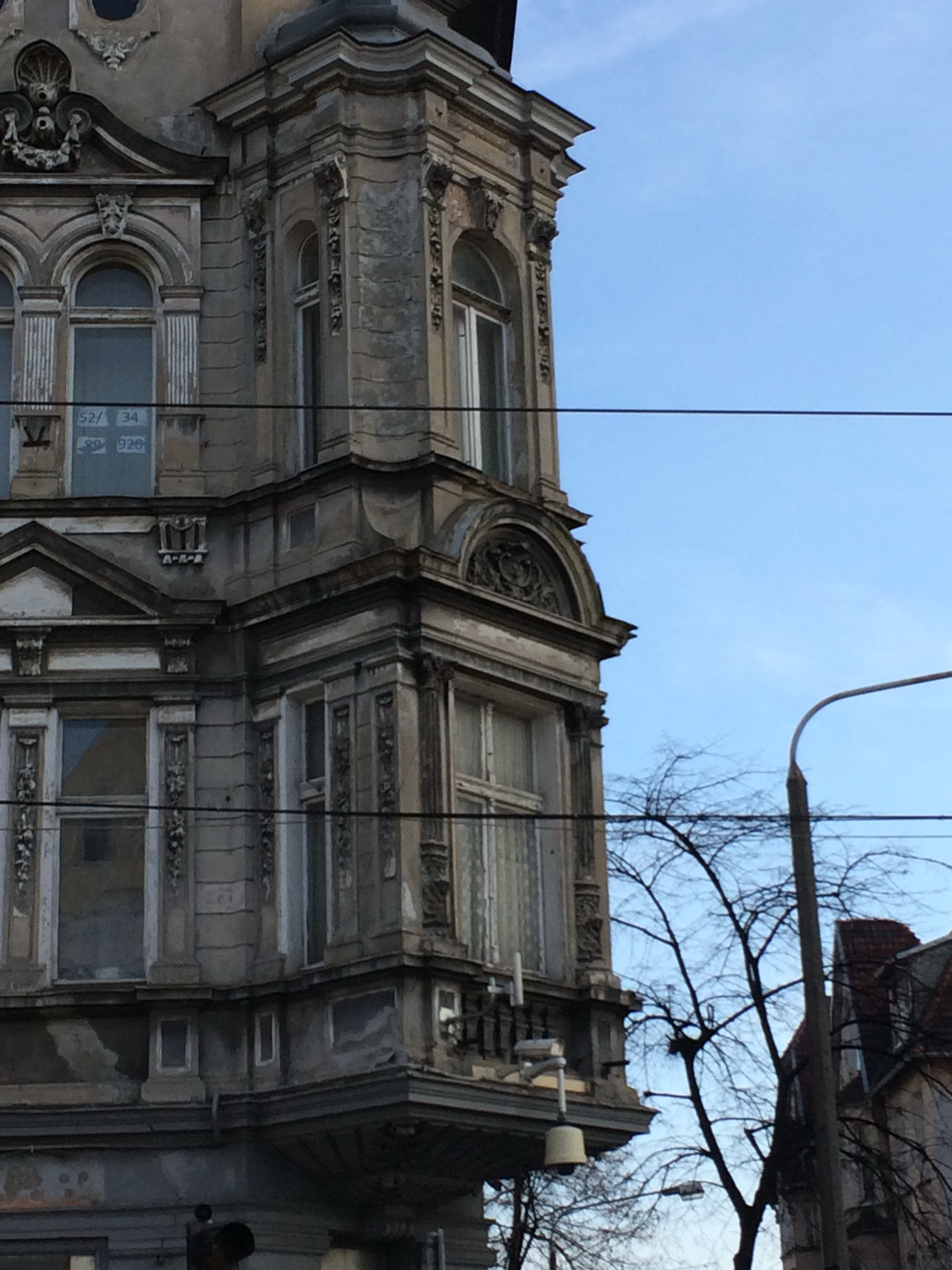
Detail of the avant-corps

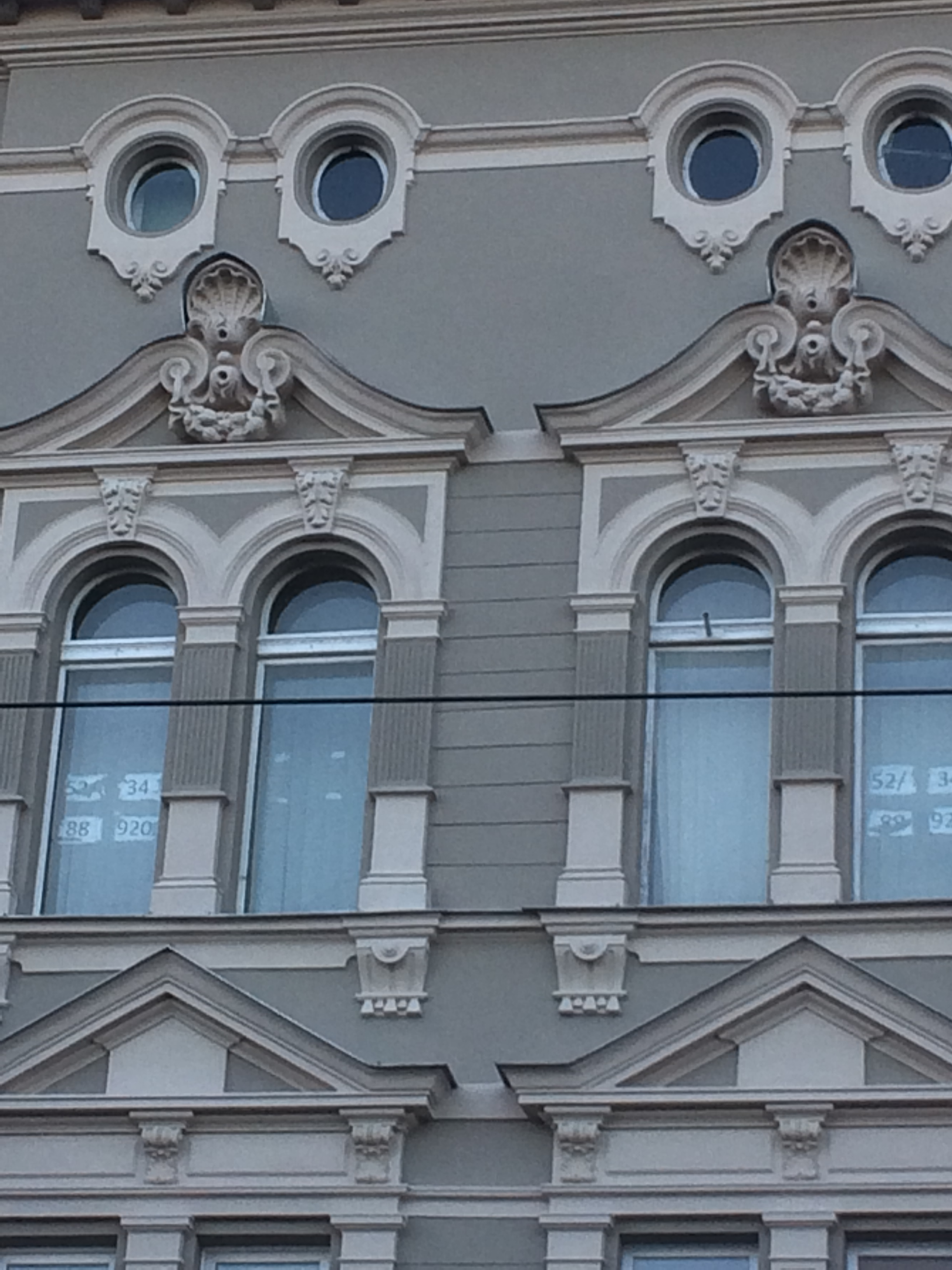
Detail of a window decoration

=== Tenement at 2, corner with Gdańska Street ===
Registered on Kuyavian-Pomeranian Voivodeship heritage list, Nr.601371-Reg.A/1090, December 15, 1993

1912, by Franz Julius Knüpfer

Modern architecture

The house originally housed large commercial premises on the ground floor.

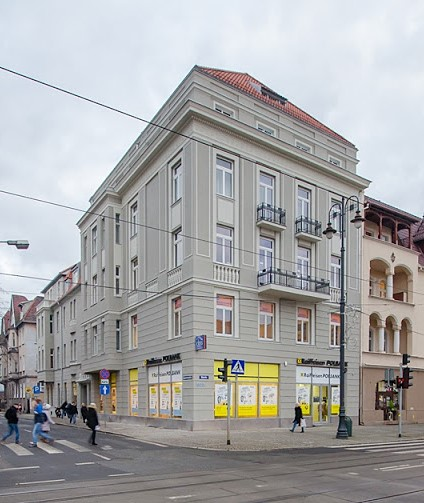
Corner view

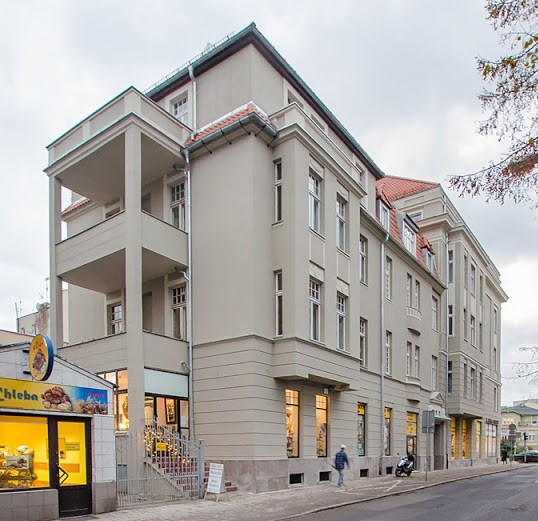
Facade onto Krasińskiego Street

=== Tenement at 3 ===
1899-1900

Historicism (art)

The first owner of the tenement at then Fröhnerstraße 13, was F. Sandmann, a merchant of upholstery who had his warehouse there, until the beginning of World War I. The plant was the predecessor of the haberdashery "Pasamon, located at 117 Jagiellońska street.

All the facade decoration has been lost with time. One can make out the bay window topped with a balcony, numerous arched windows and two shed dormers. It has been entirely rebuilt in the 1920s.

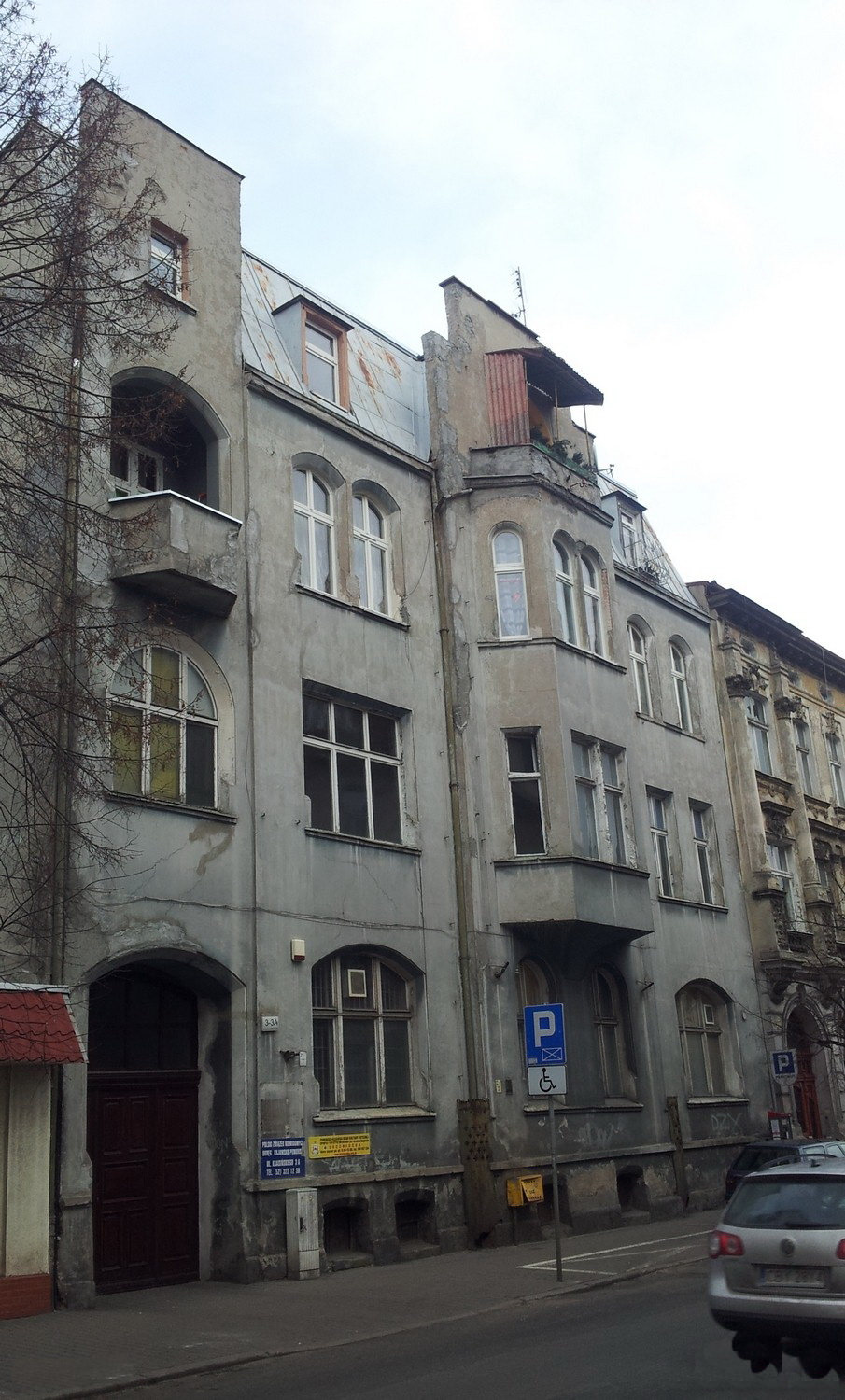
View from the street

=== Tenement at 4 ===
Registered on Kuyavian-Pomeranian Voivodeship heritage list, Nr.729691, Reg.A/1550/1-2, February 2, 2010

1899-1900

Eclecticism in architecture

The first owner of the tenement at then Fröhnerstraße 14, was Mr Weiß, a master mason. In the 1980s, a stained glass shop (Polish: Witraze) was located at this place, who stayed there till the outbreak of World War I. The building underwent a full renovation in 2019–2020.

This large house is close by its concept to those realized by Fritz Weidner, such as Cieszkowski Street Nr.13/15, Gdańska Street 79 or Śniadecki Street 29. Facades are marked by glass panes, several architectural details break the symmetry of the ensemble (bay windows, many different gables or bartizan). At some places, timber framing is visible. The entrance still possesses a delicate wrought iron fence with floral motifs.

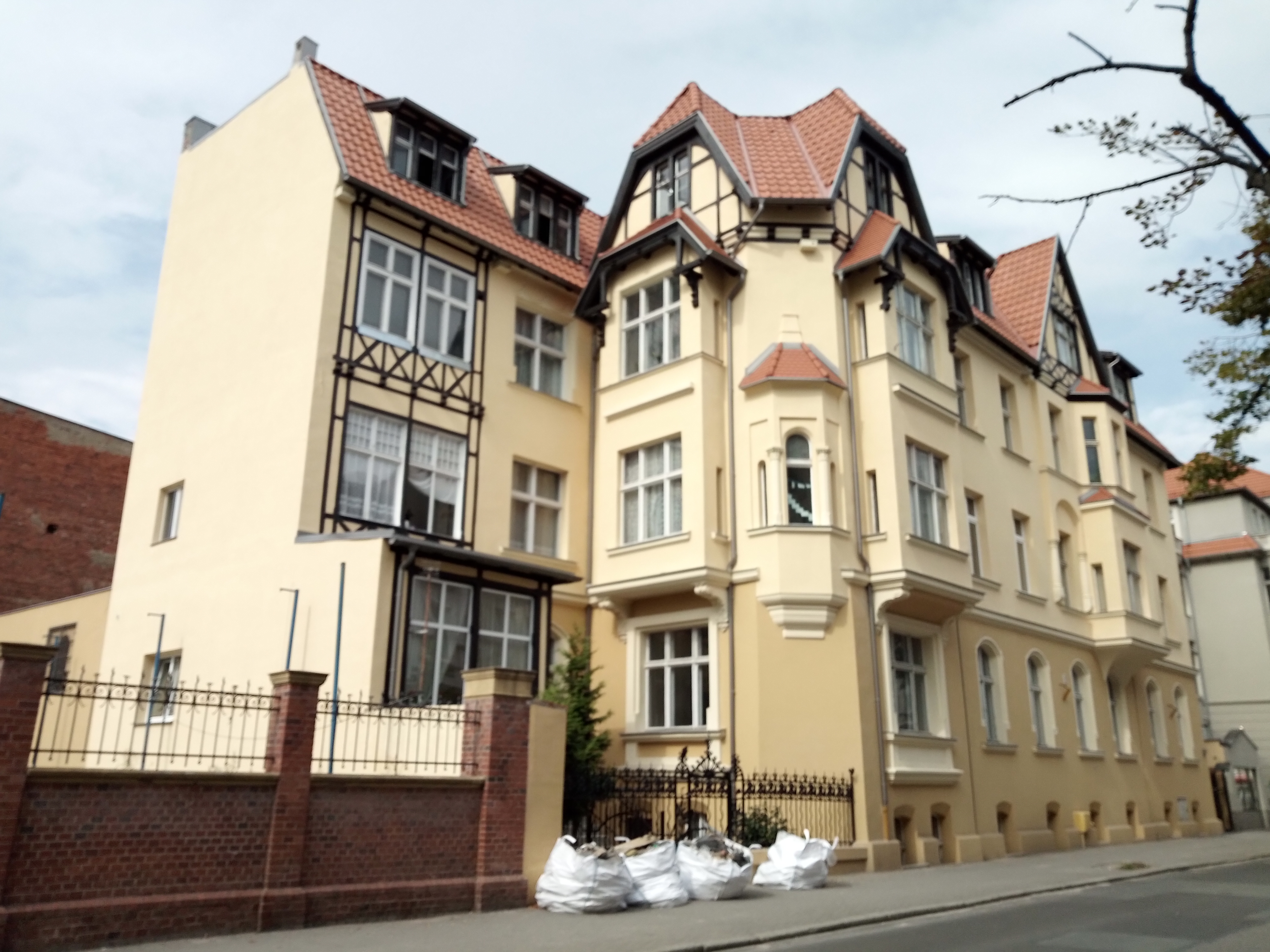
The tenement post-renovation

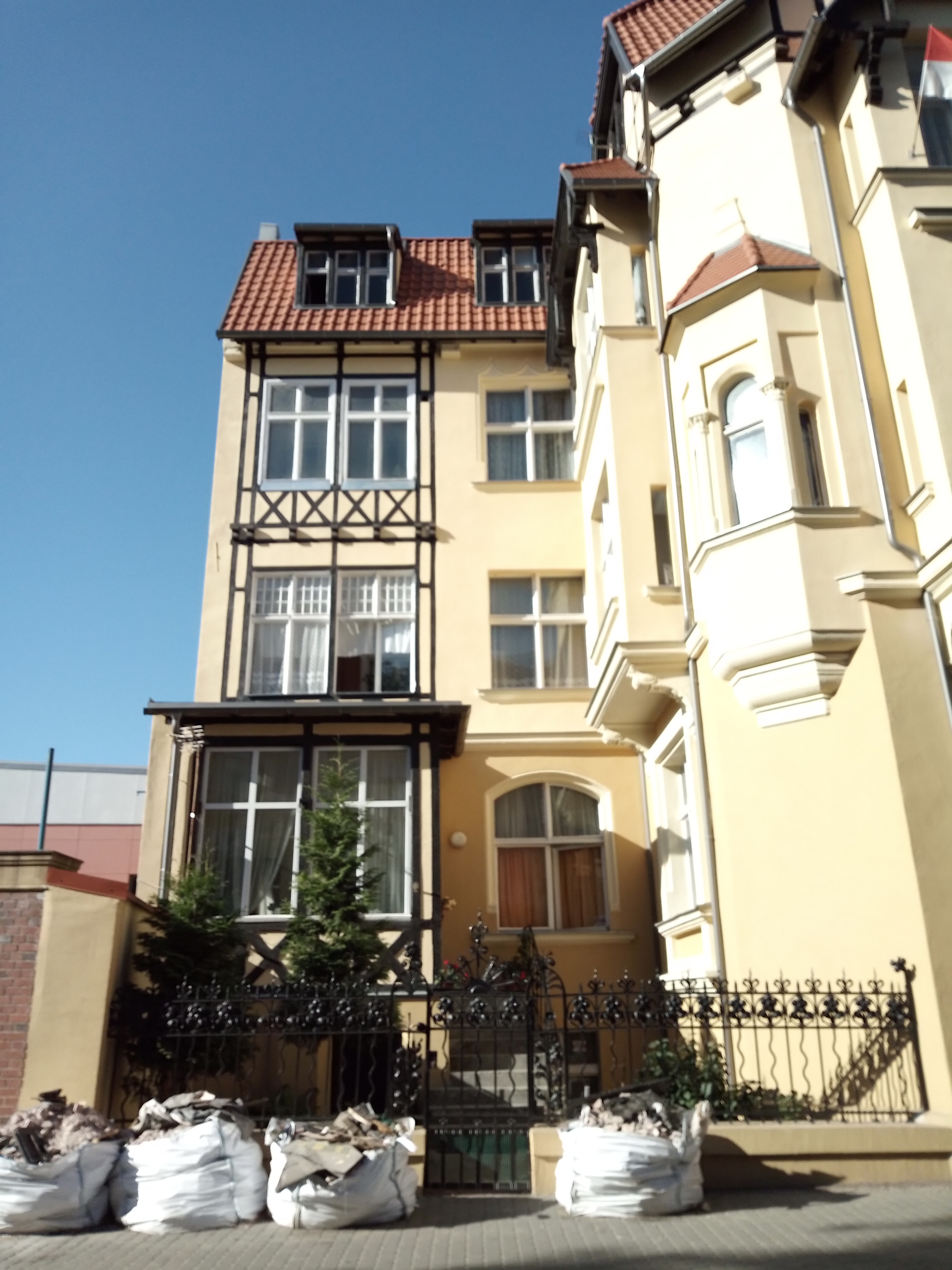
Renovated entrance yard

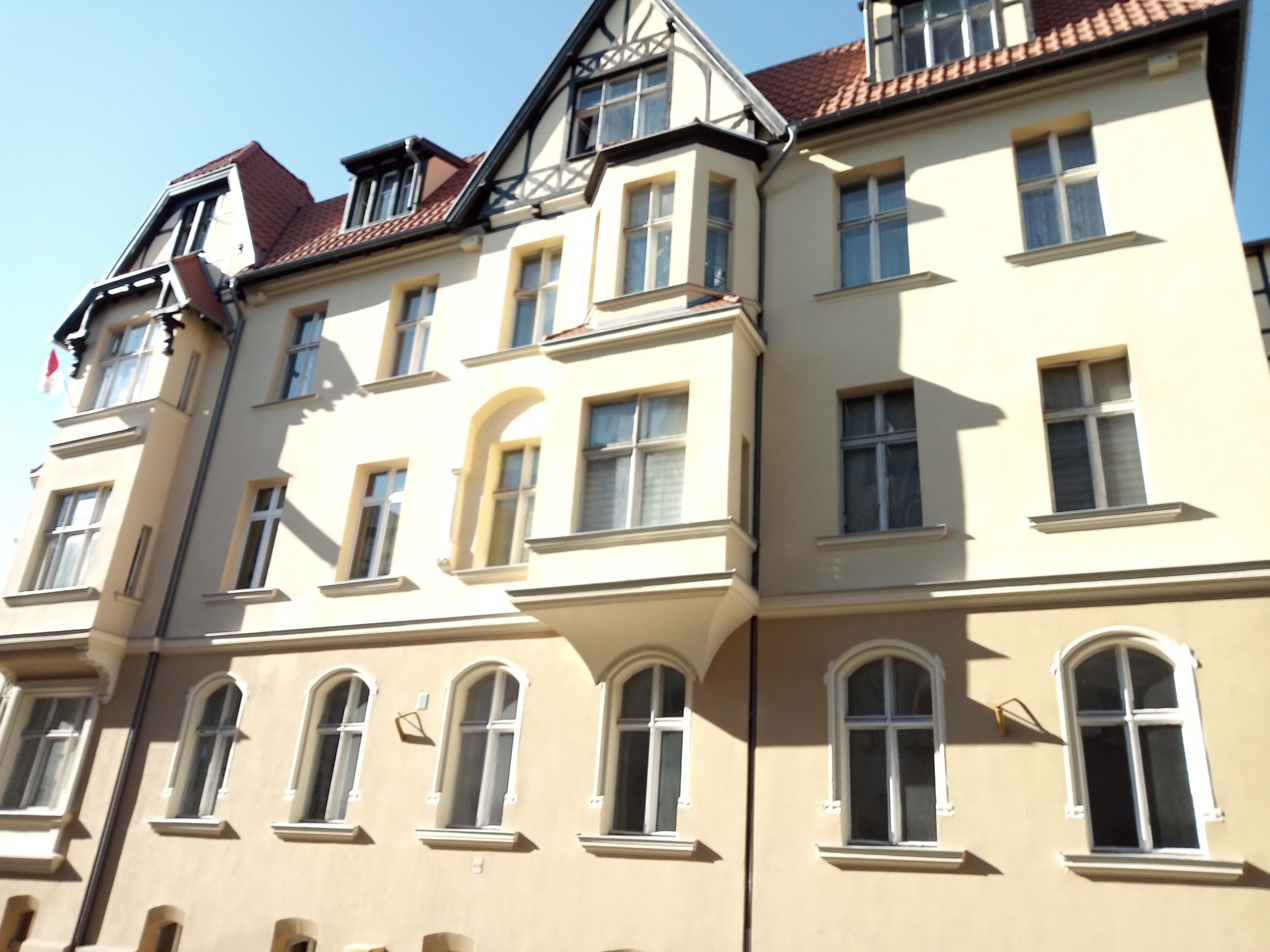
Renovated facade on the street

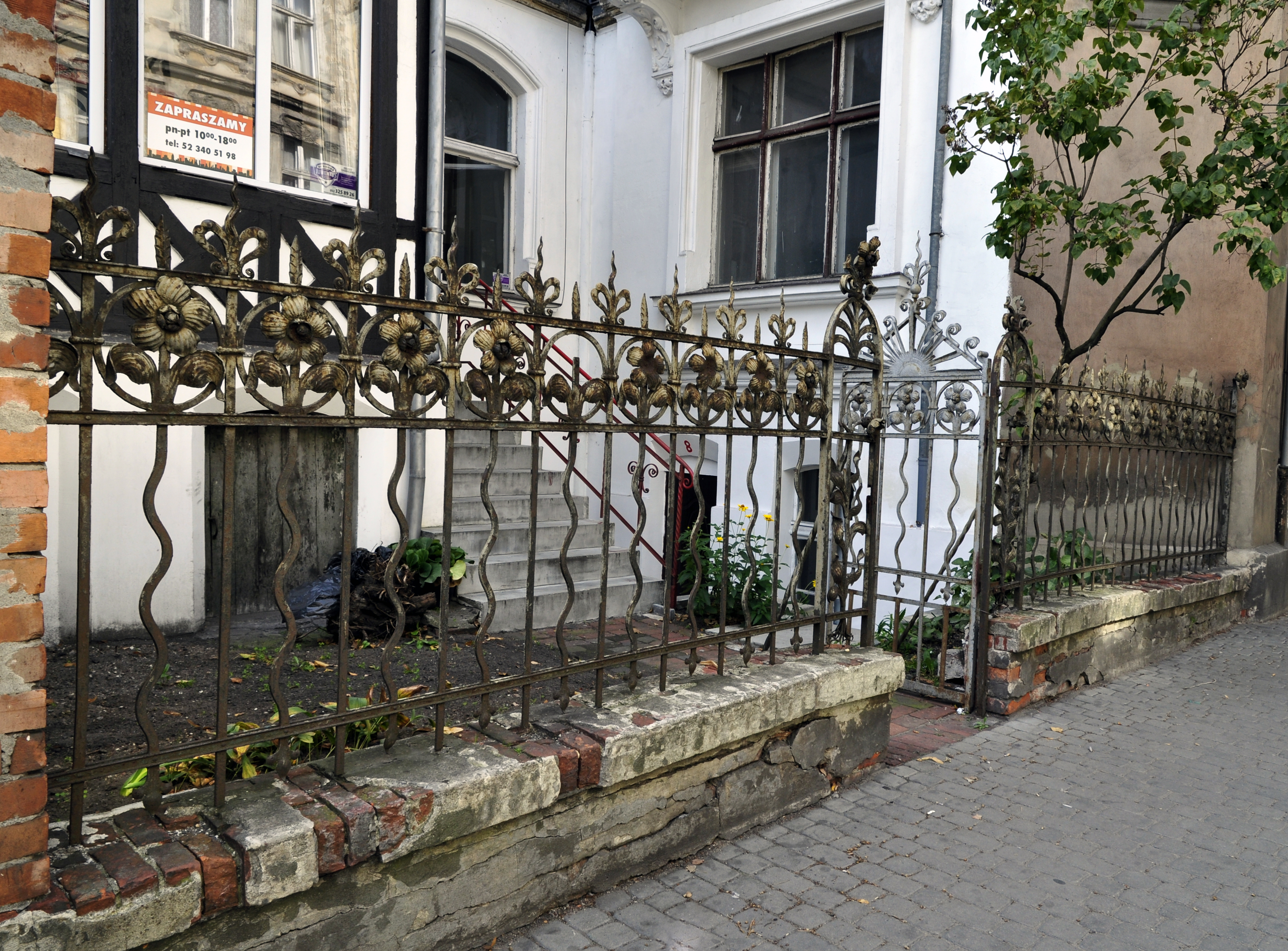
Wrought iron fence

=== Otto Bloch Tenement, at 5 ===
1899-1900

Eclecticism in architecture & Neo-Baroque, elements of Neo-classicism

The first owner of the tenement at then Fröhnerstraße 12, was Otto Bloch, a pharmacist, who lived there until the 1920s. Pediments above second floor windows bear caducei, as a reminder of Otto Bloch's activity.

The elevation features a large bay window and two grand Corinthian order columns balancing the other side of the facade. The frontage keeps many Neo-Baroque details: putti on corbels, balustrade on the first floor, delicate motifs on the main double door, numerous floral and vegetal motifs on pilasters, on window pediments and a row of corbels topping the ensemble.

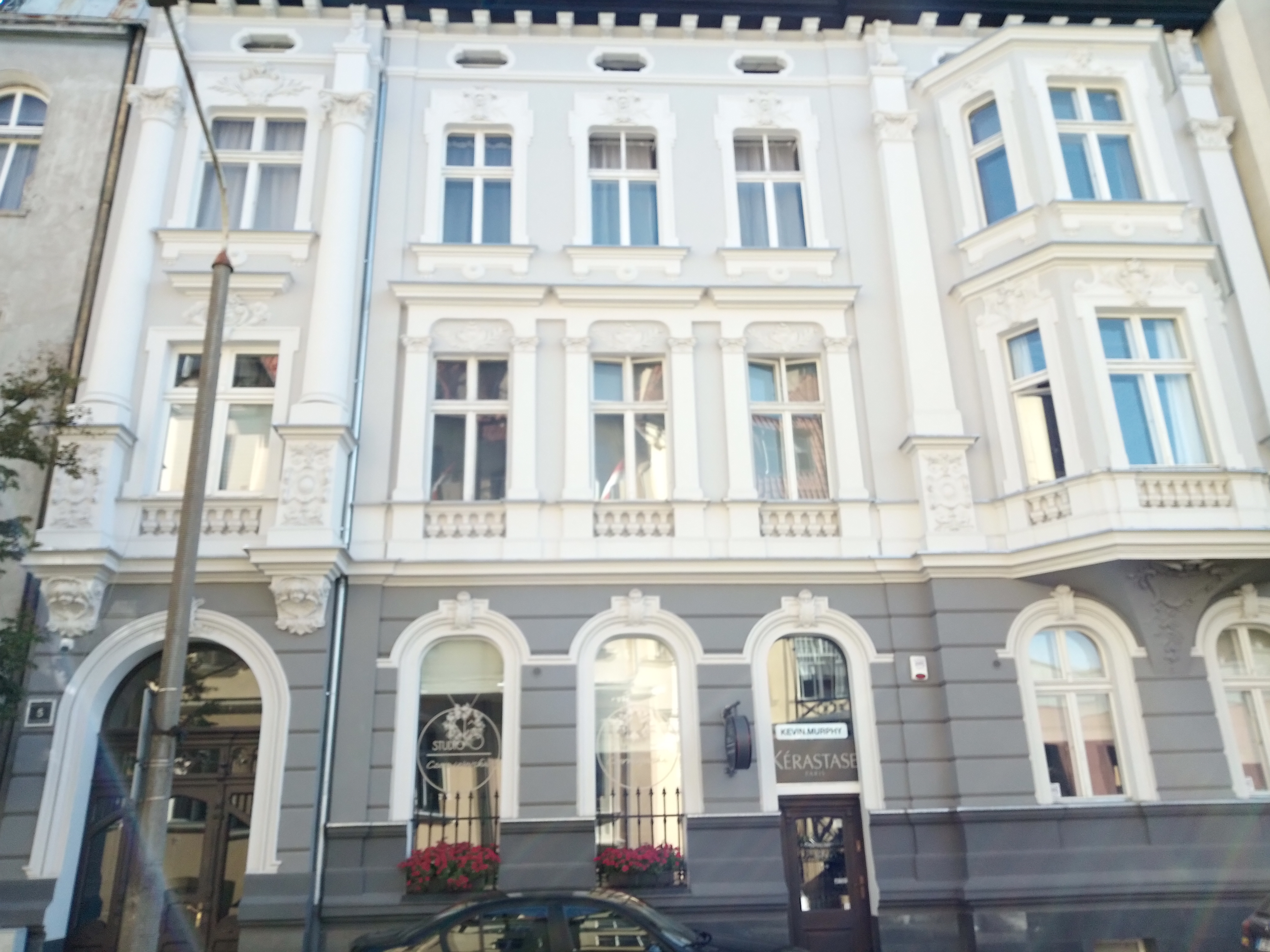
Renovated main elevation

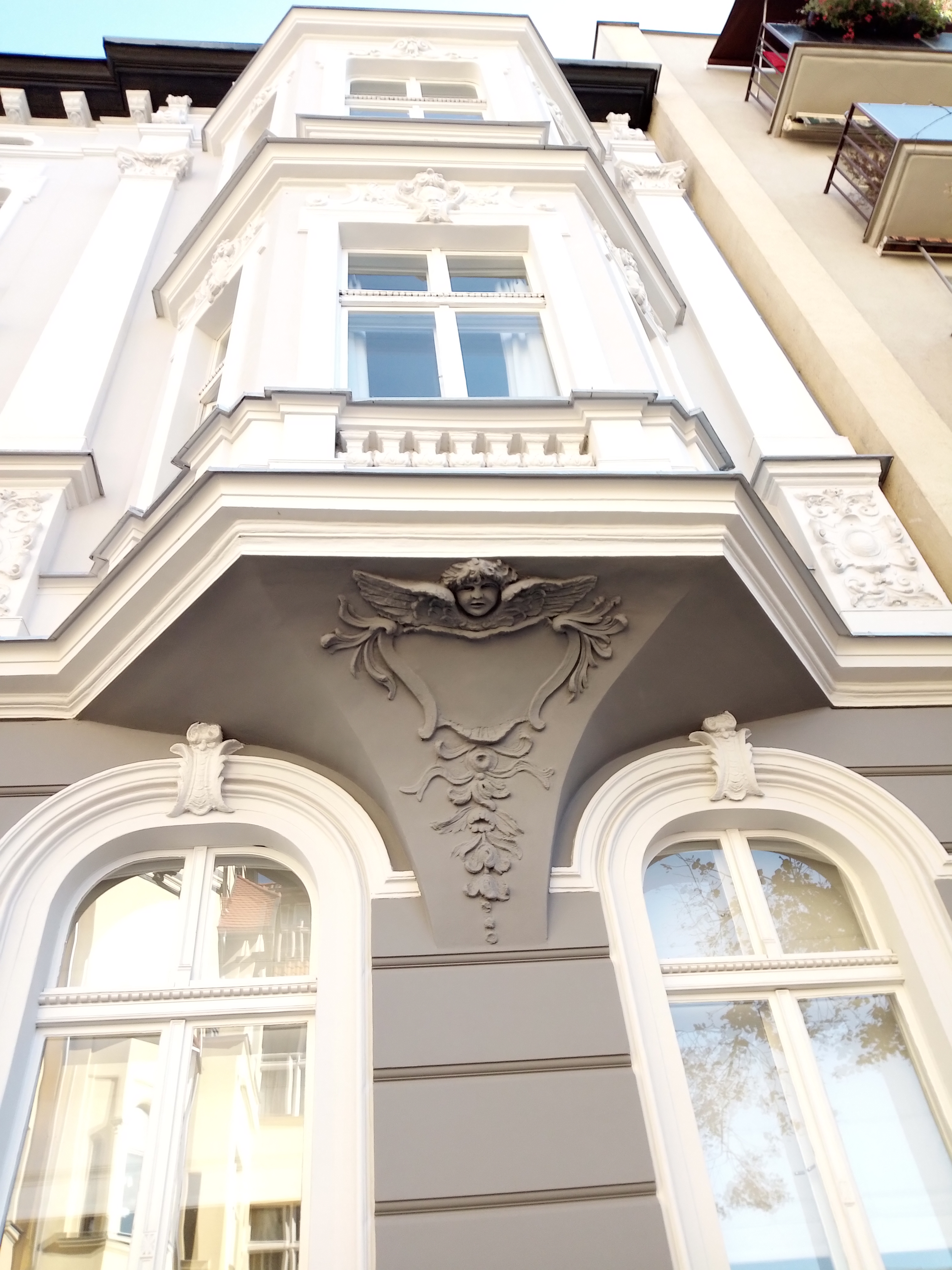
Stuccoed motifs details

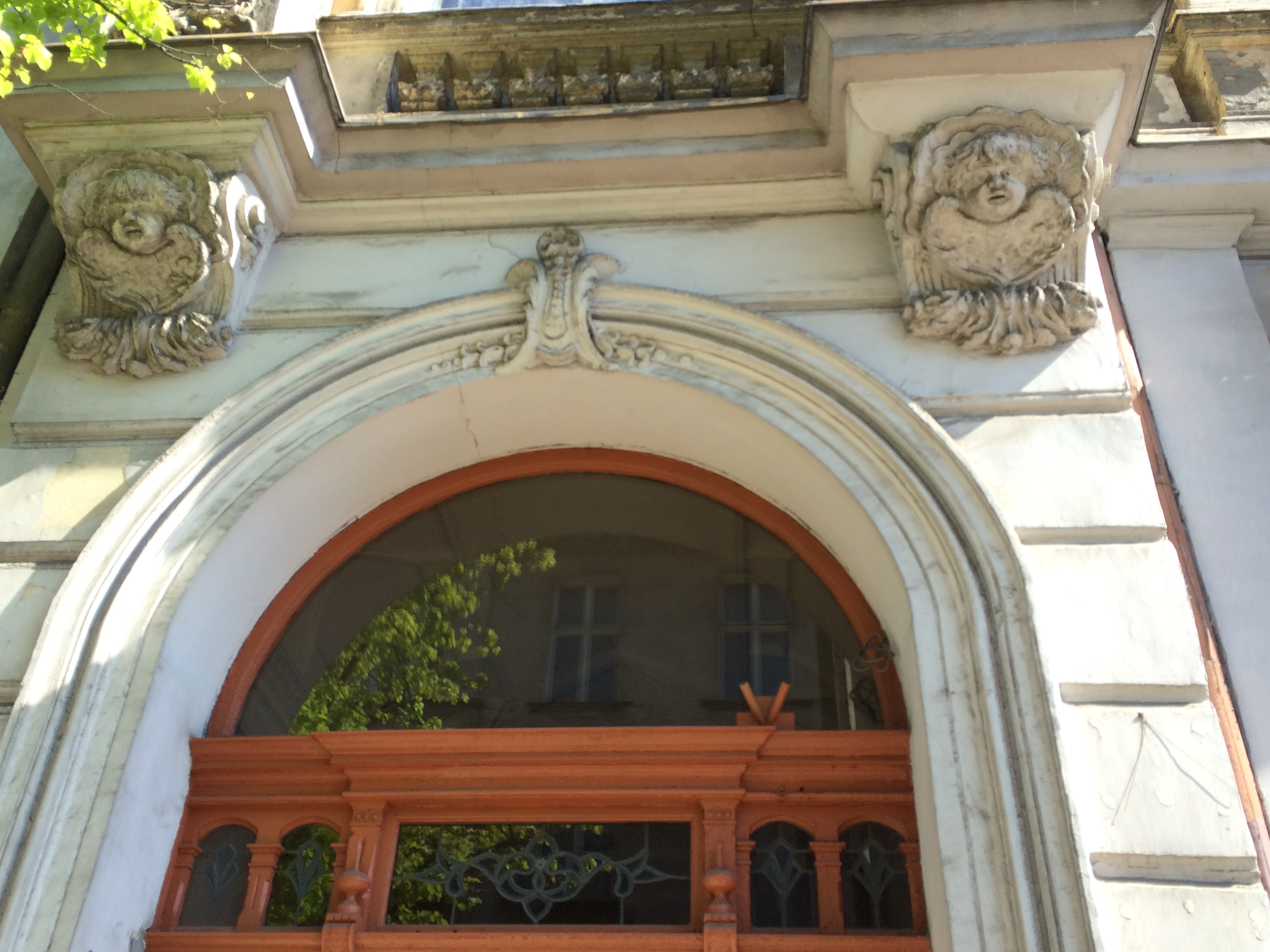
Putti as corbels above the gate

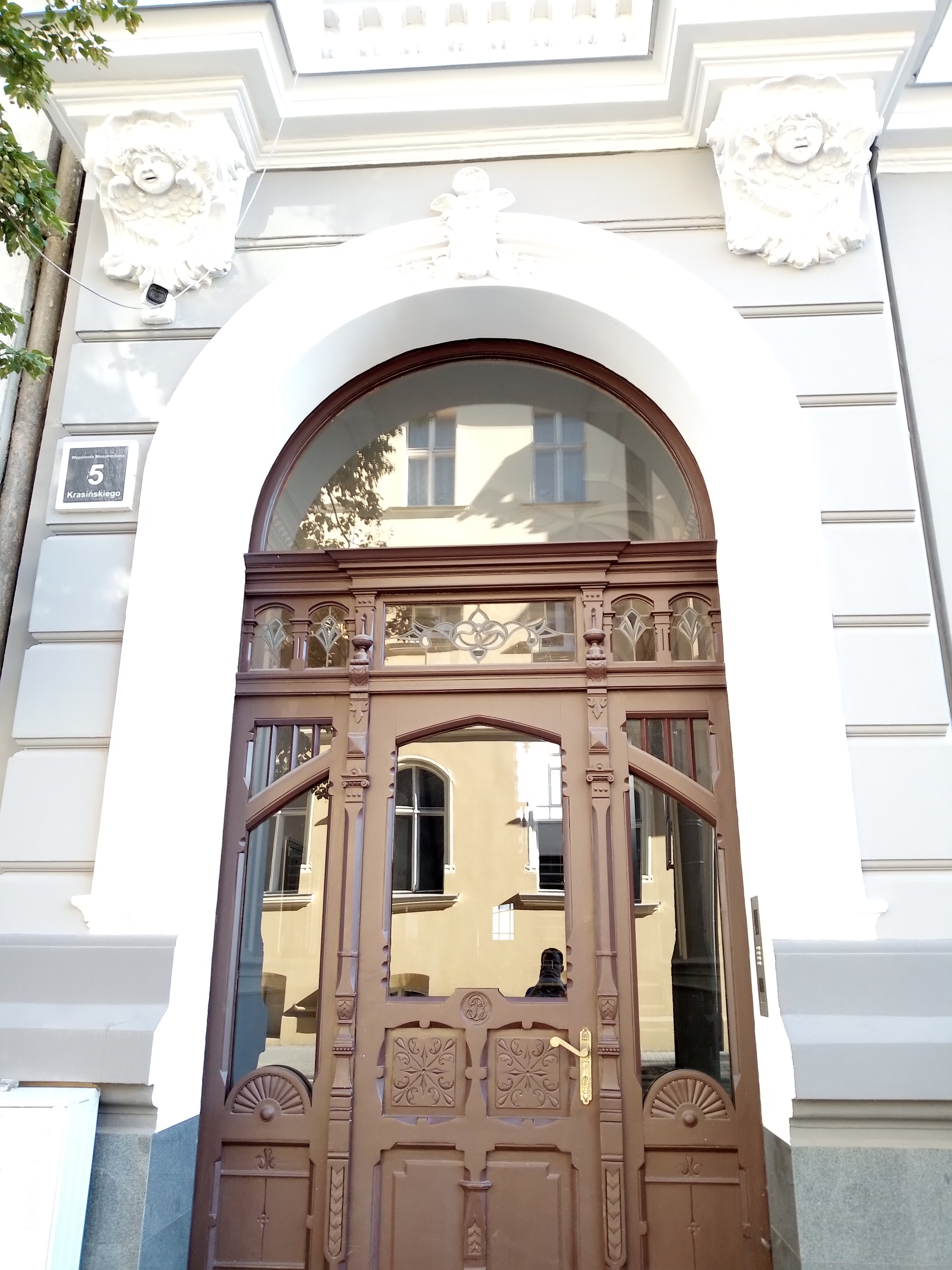
Renovated entrance gate

=== Building at 6 ===
The plot at Nr.6 is the location of the sporting area of Bydgoszcz's Gymnasium Nr.1. The edifice was originally created as a sport building for the L. Braille special educational centre for blind children.

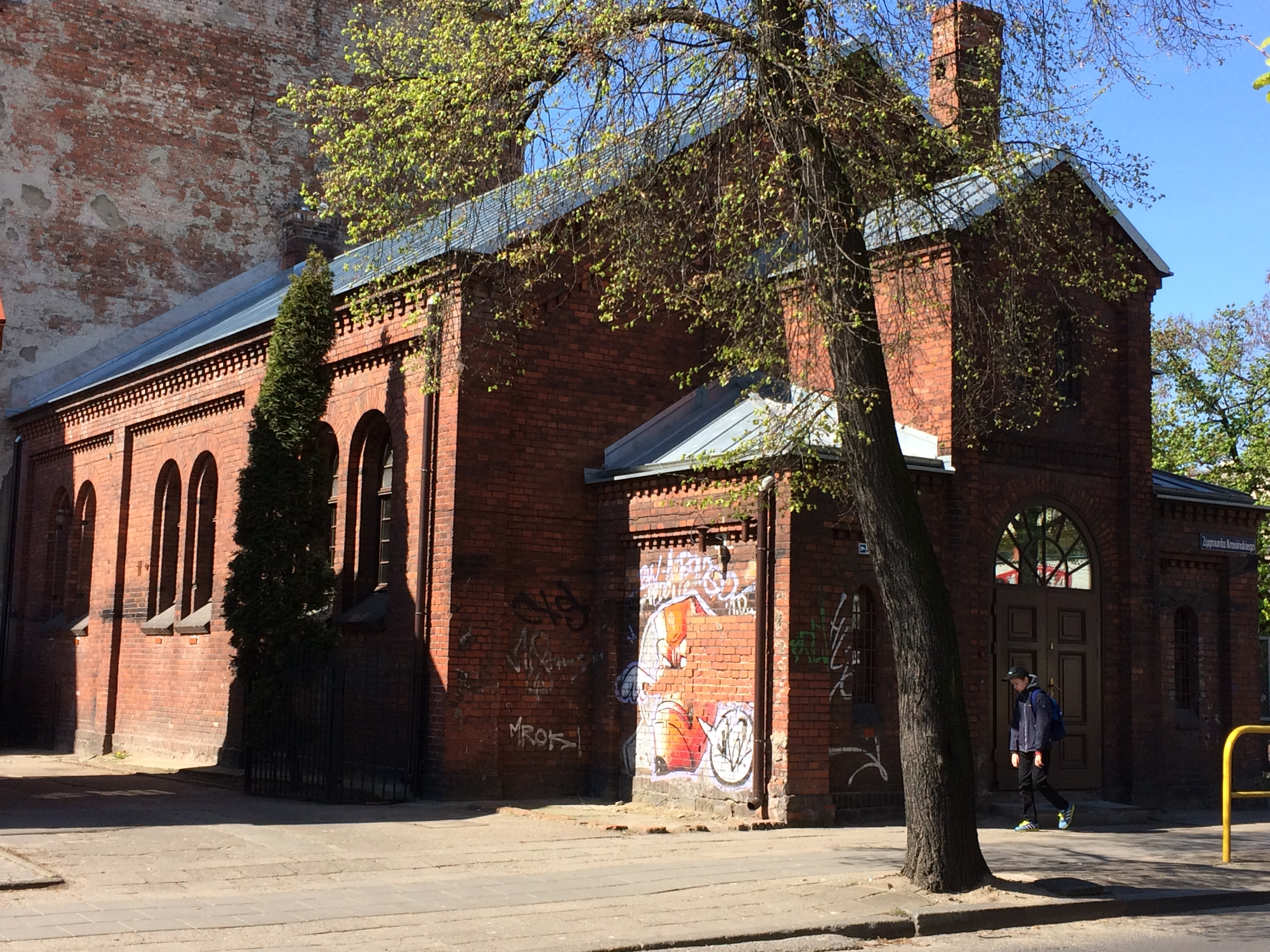
Building viewed from the street

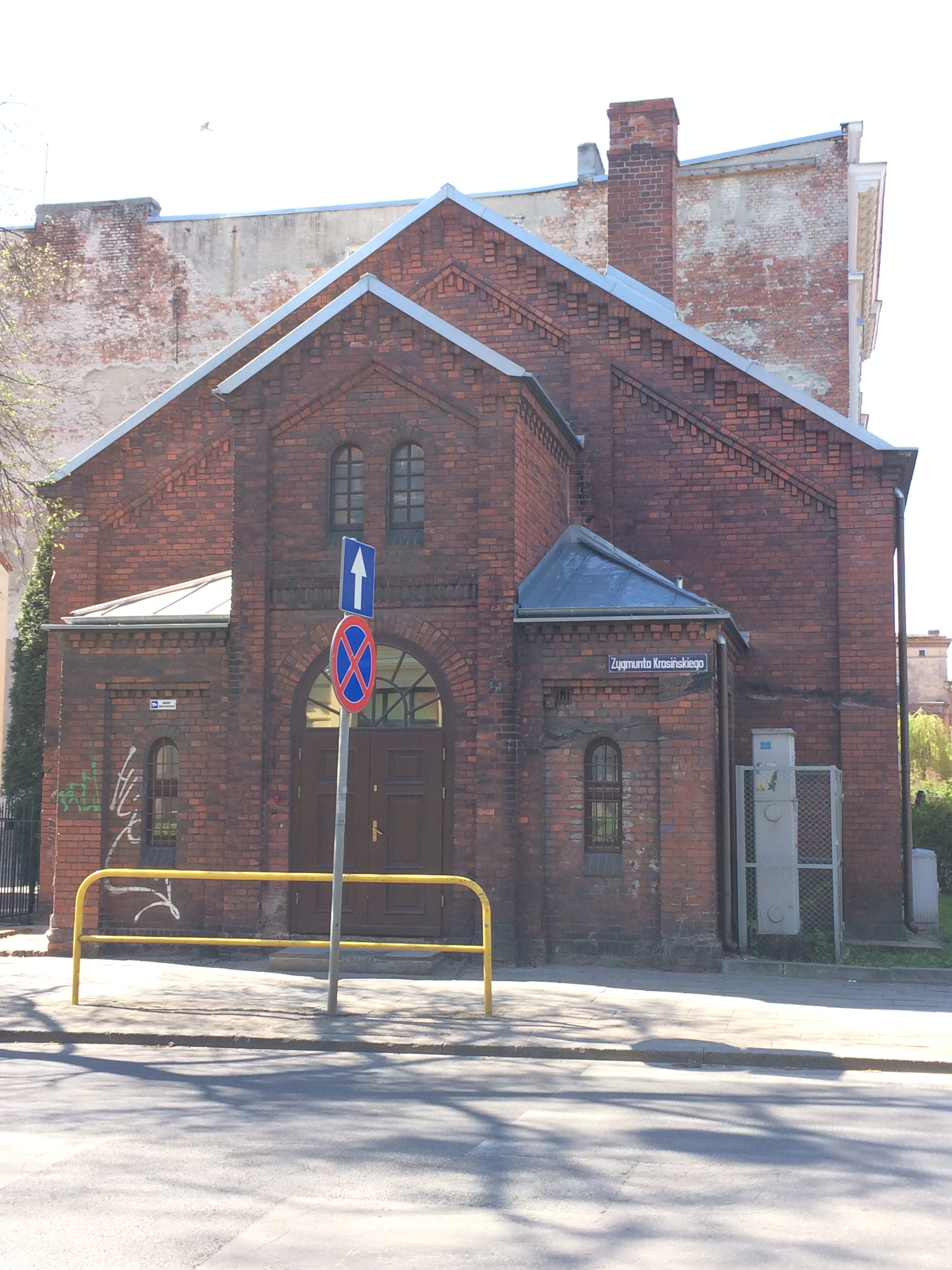
Main entry

=== Tenement at 9, corner with Libelta street ===
1896, by Karl Bergner

Eclecticism, Historicism

The first landlord at then Fröhnerstraße 10 was Anton Czarnecki, a rentier and merchant, who moved there in 1898 and stayed till the early 1920s. At the end of 2017, the building was added a Mansard roof.

The present one displays eclectic architectural details, a ground floor underlined by the arched entry gate flanked by pilasters, topped by a mask, the ensemble being overlooked by a bay window with bossages. The first floor is the most decorated, mainly with the effort put in the window framings. Each of them is ornamented with accuracy by pilasters, columns, balustrade on the bottom and pediments on the top. The variety of shapes, forms and motifs could even be labelled as Neo-Baroque influence. The upper level is crowned by a corbel table shaped in animal figures.

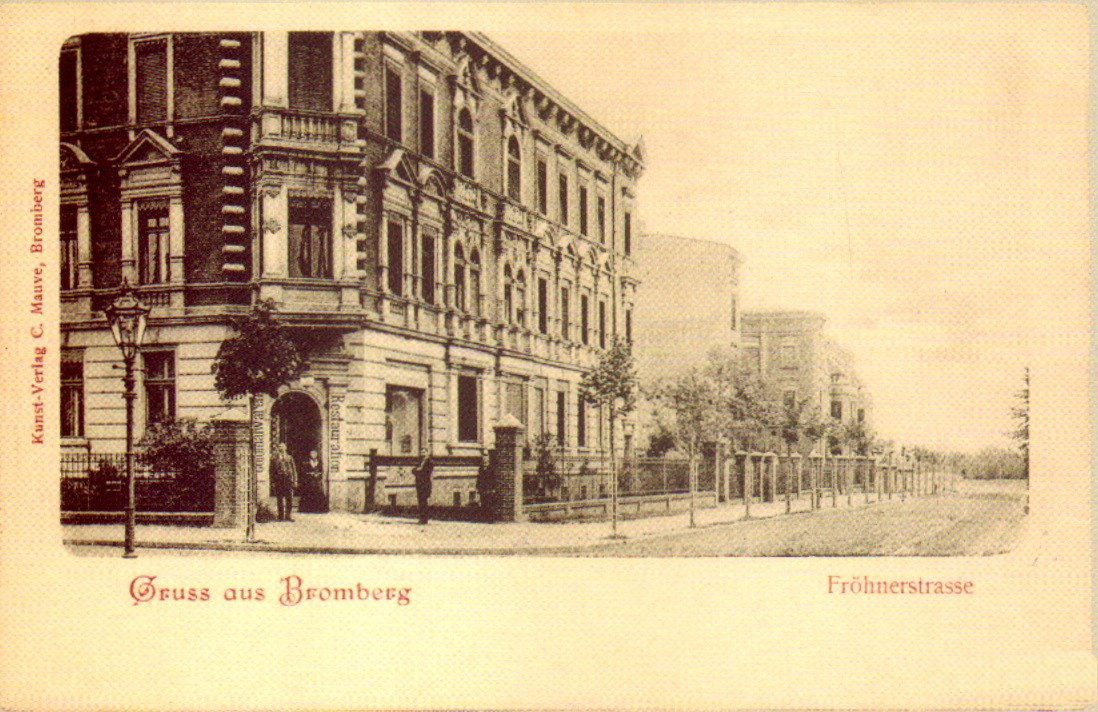
The tenement on a 1908 postcard

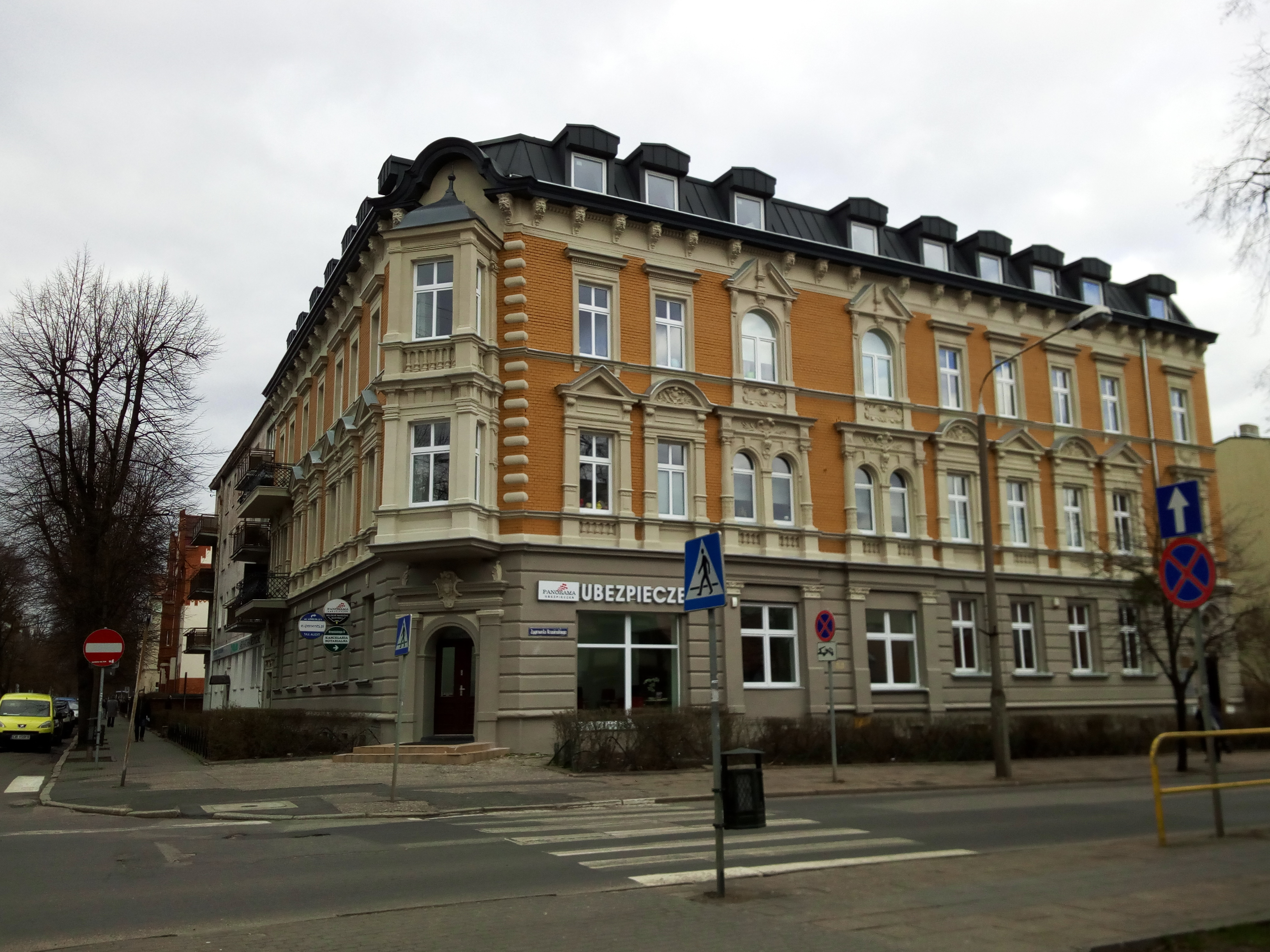
View from Krasiński Street

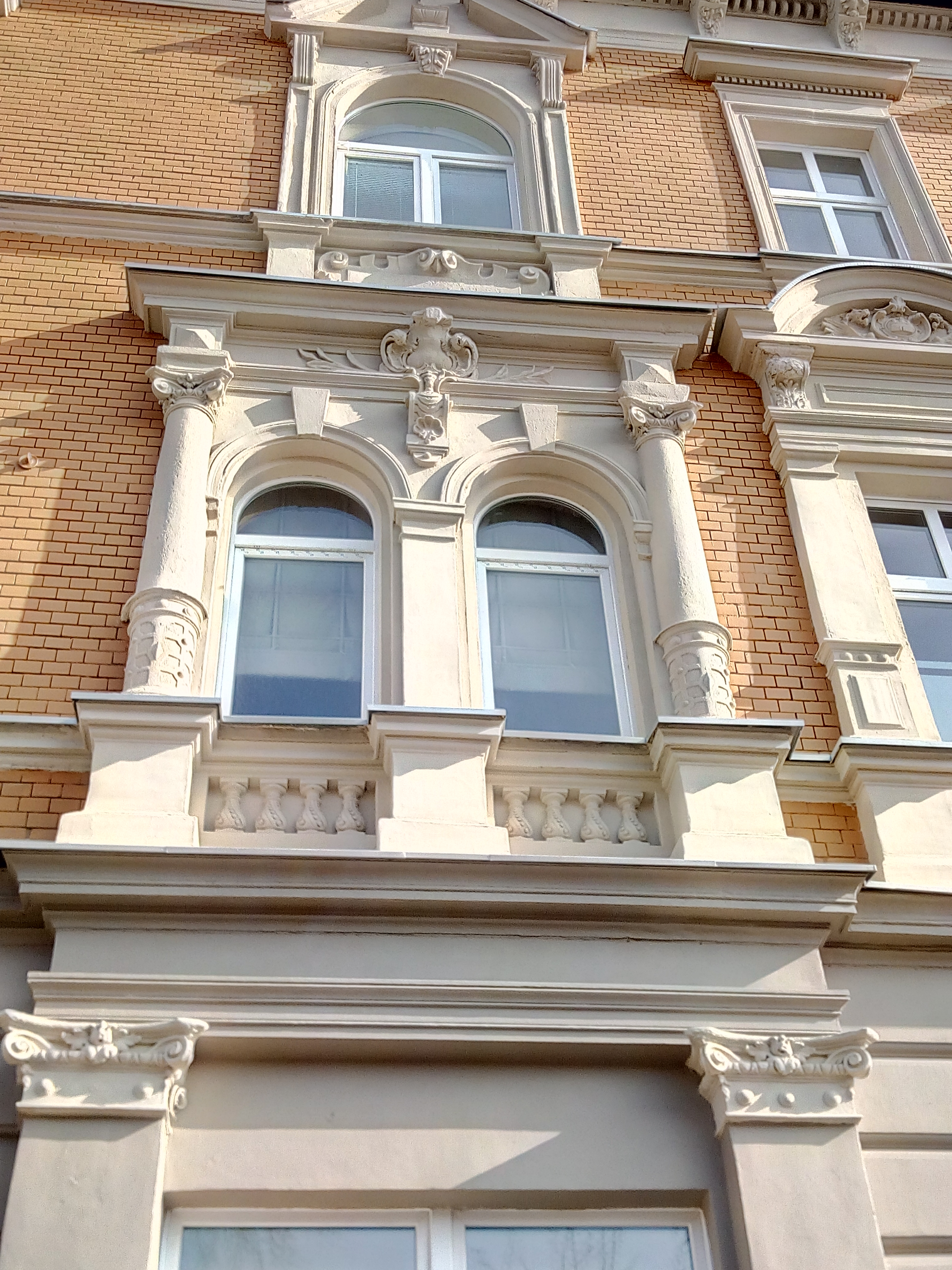
Stucco details

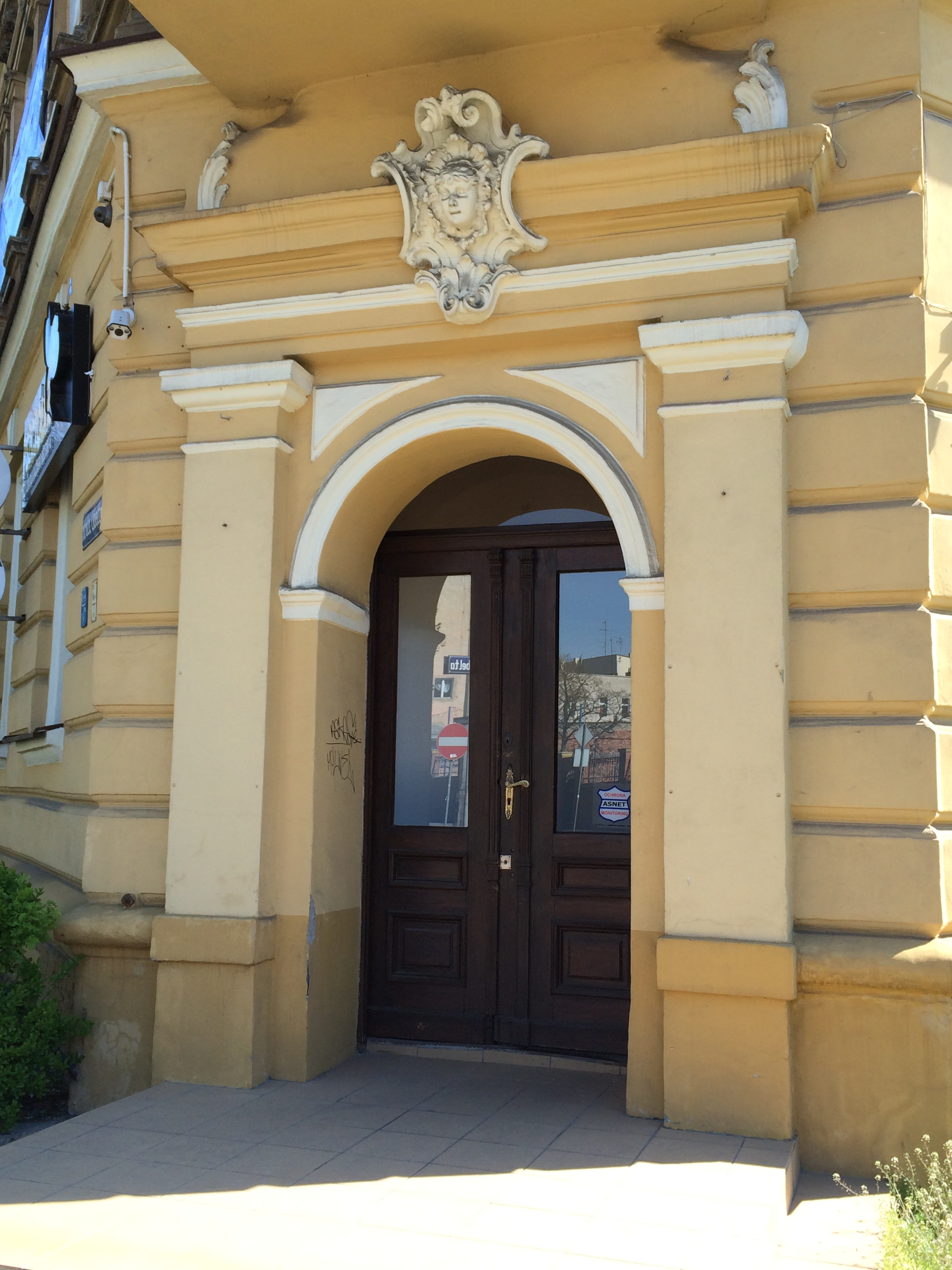
Main gate

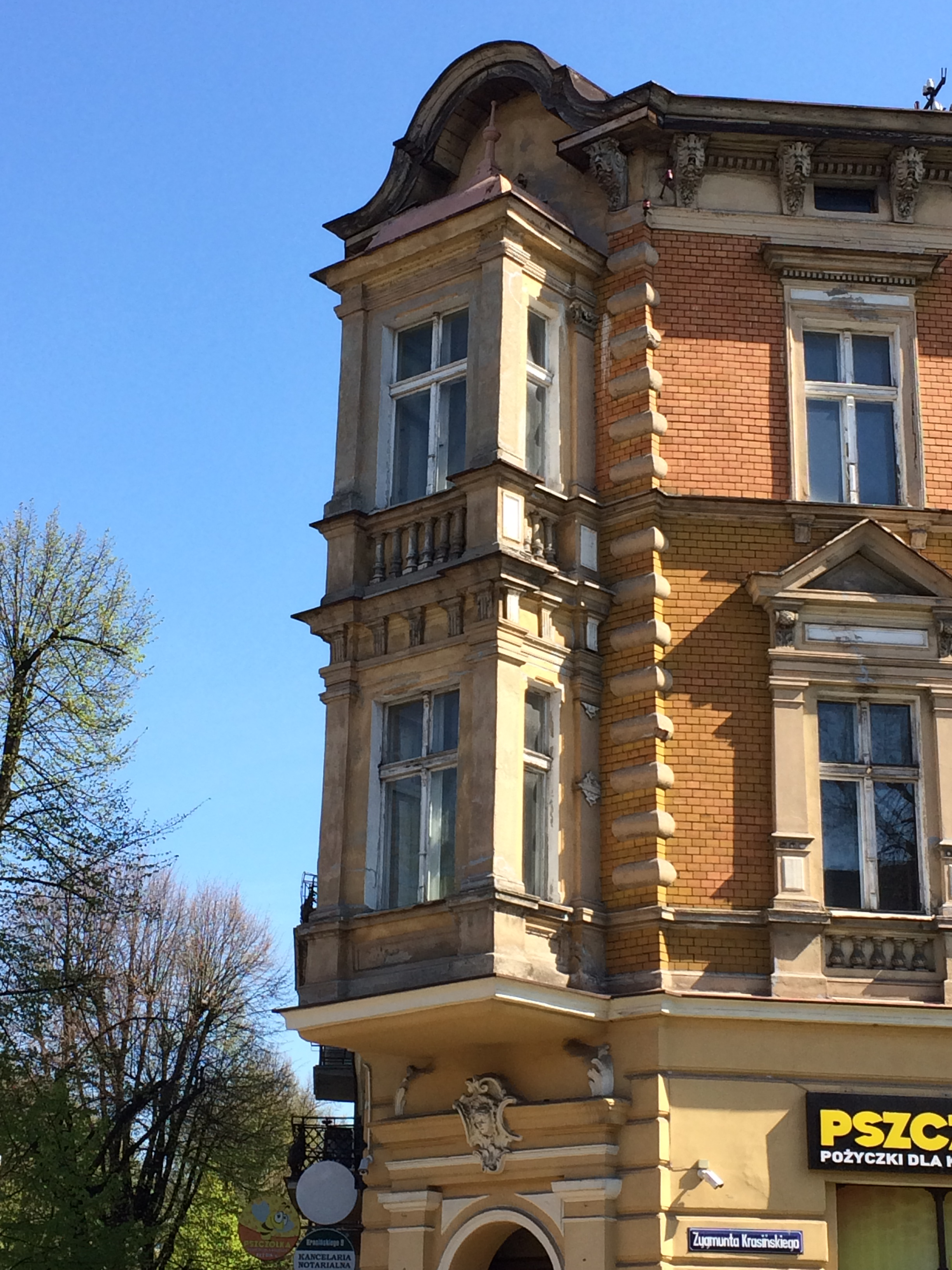
Bay window

=== L. Braille special educational centre for blind children, at 10, corner with 3 Maja street ===
1872, Fritz Müller

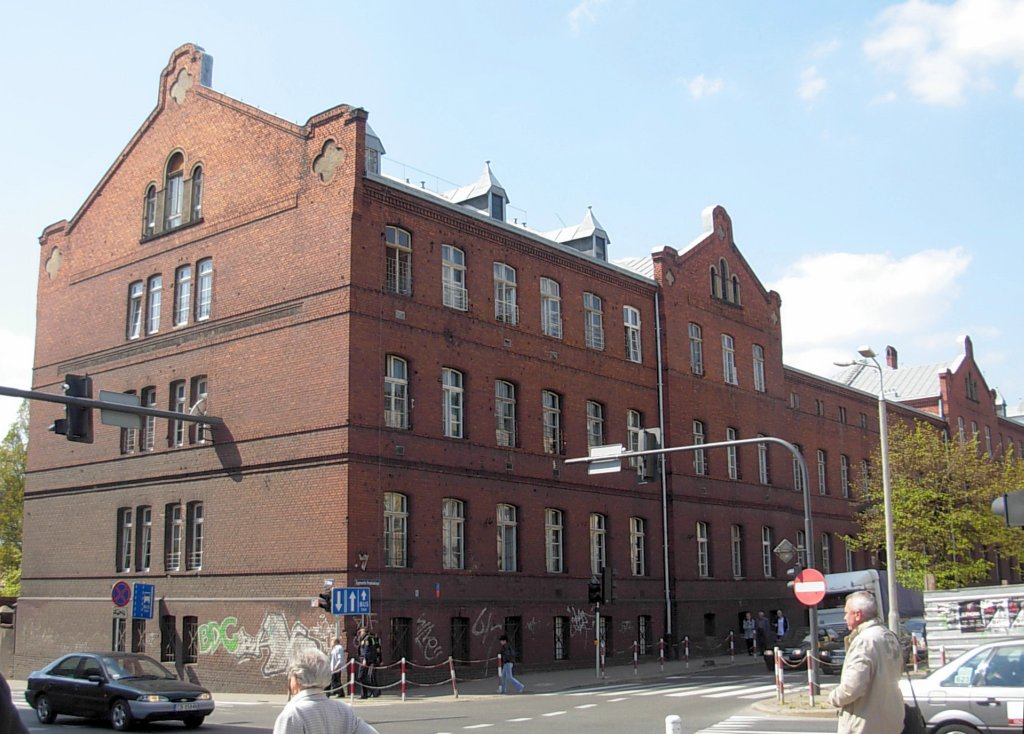
View from the street

=== Tenements at Nr.13/15/17 ===
1894

Eclecticism & Neo-classicism

These tenements at then Fröhnerstraße Nr.6/7/8 were owned by the municipality. Around twenty tenants were living in these Bromberg city apartments (German: wohnungsverein gehörig).

The U-shape of the building recalls classical architecture patterns, creating an inside courtyard off the street. Renovated in 2012 with brio, one can underline the perfect symmetry of the ensemble, from the location of the doors (the main gate at Nr.15 is mirrored by an arched stone frame without door), to the pediment design above the windows, to the successive avant-corps and topping large triangular pediment emphasizing the axis of symmetry of the edifice.

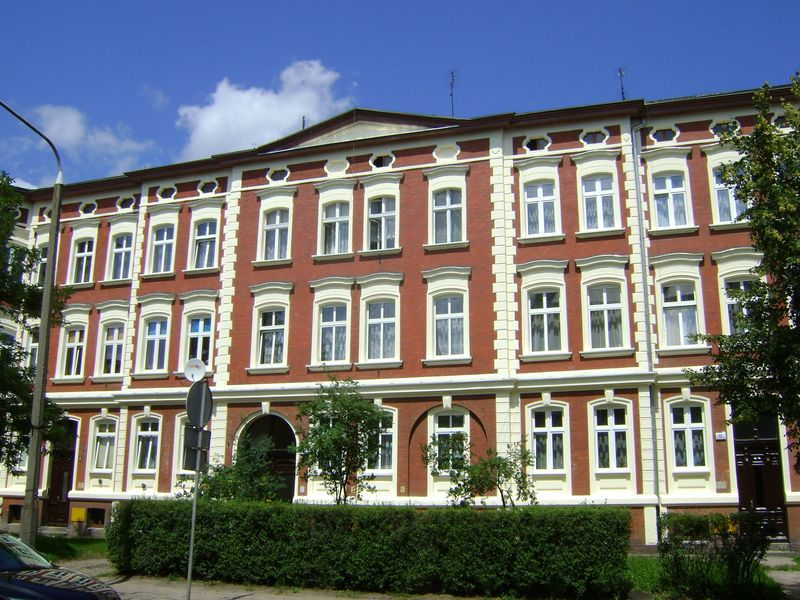
View from the street

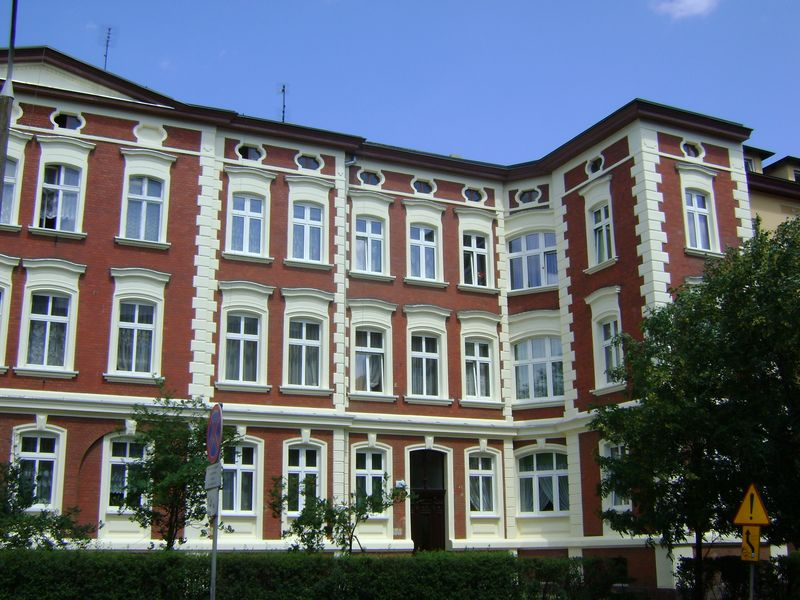
One the wings

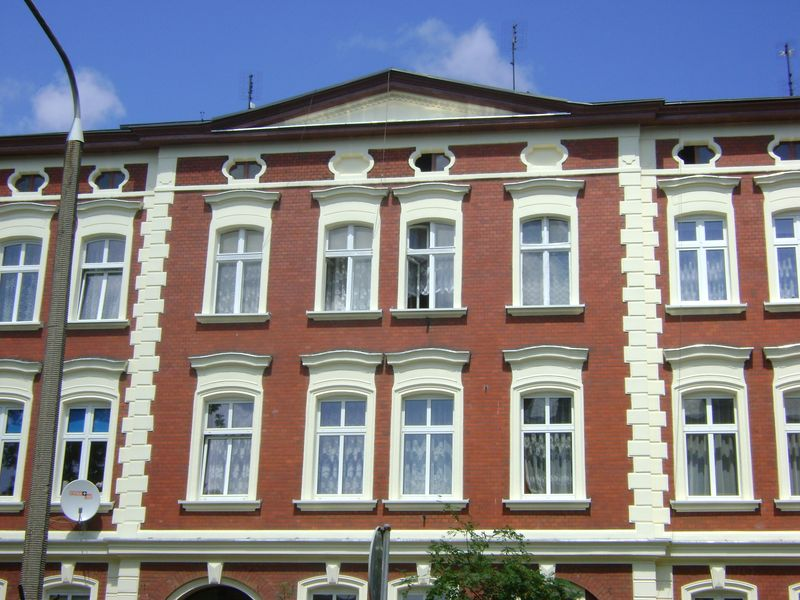
Avant-corps and pediment

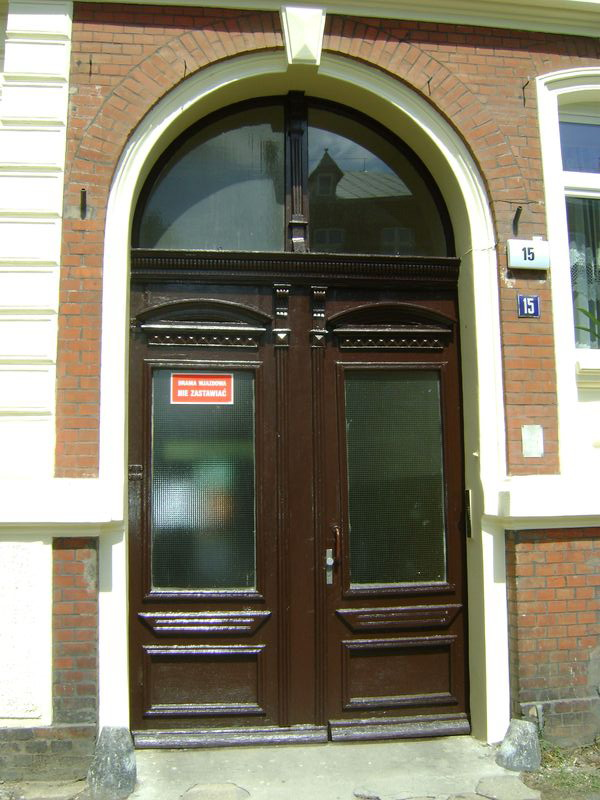
Gate at Nr.15

=== Tenement at 19 ===
1895-1896

Eclecticism & Neo-classicism

The first landlord at Fröhnerstraße 5 was Heinrich ßietsch, a tailor. Among his tenants was a teacher for blind children, August Fleig, working at the Specialized school on the other side of the street.

Recently refurbished, the facade displays perfect Neo-classic symmetry. Worth noticing are the two avant-corps arranged with loggias and the numerous shed dormers on the roof.

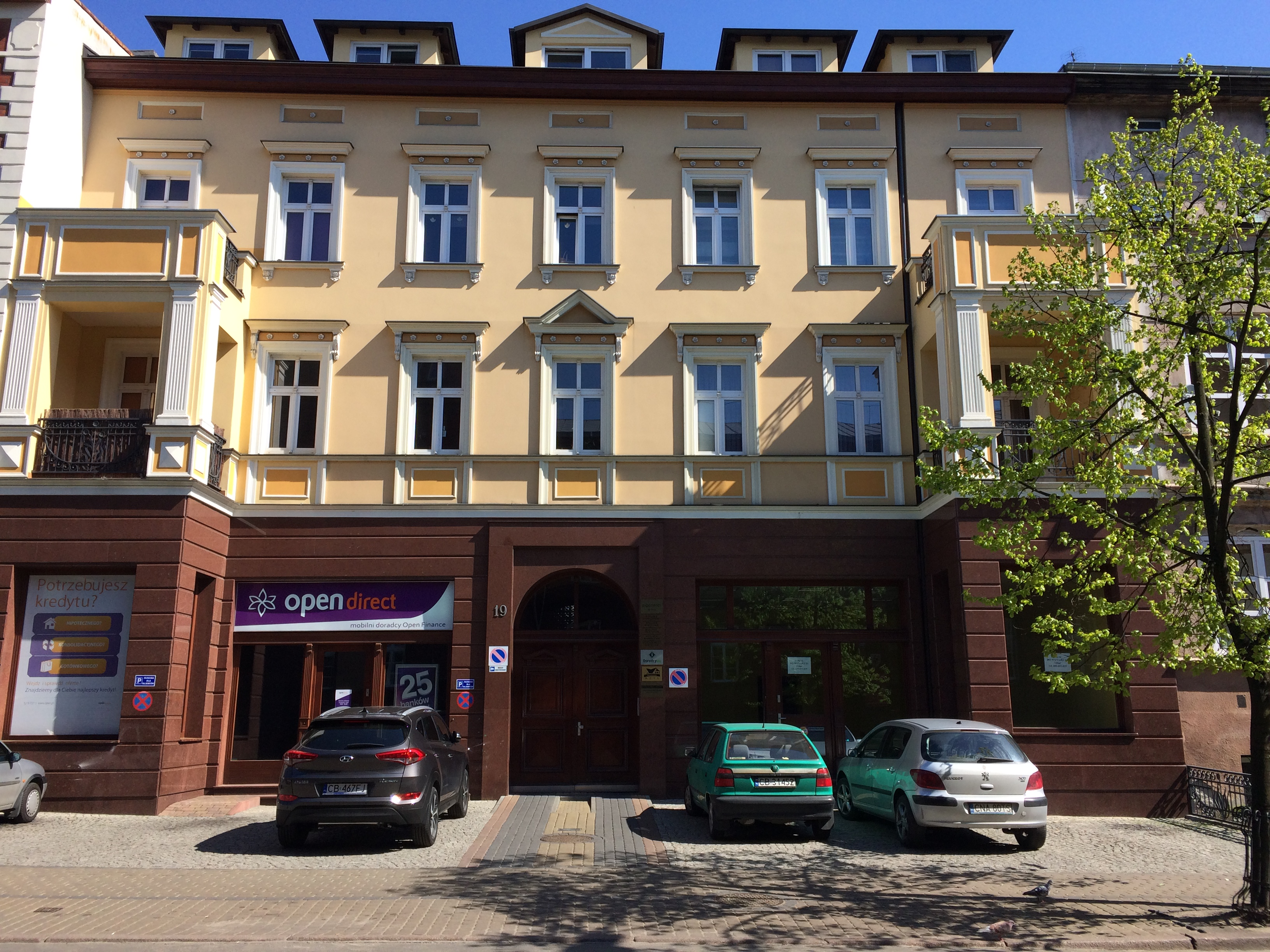
Main elevation

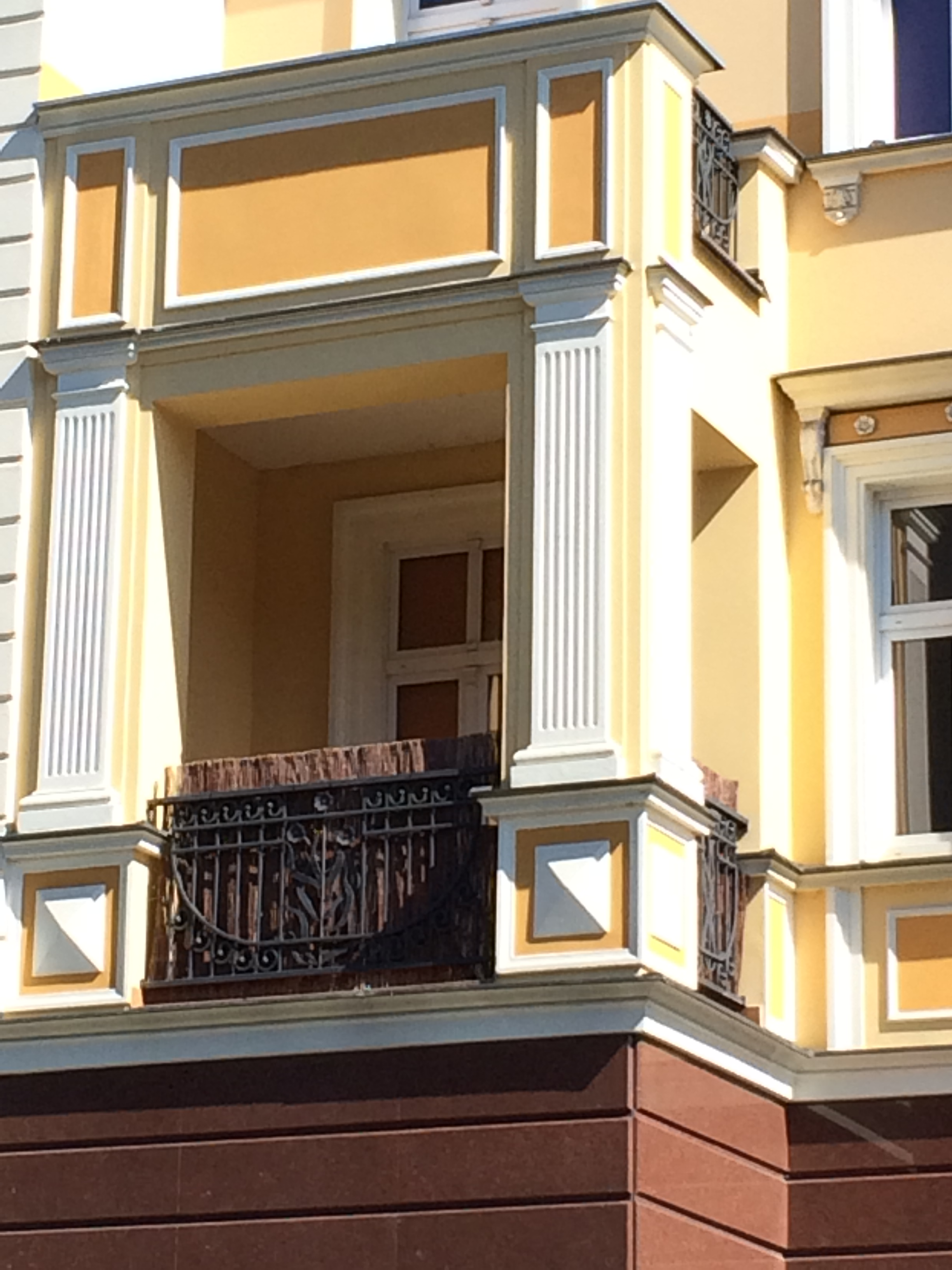
Loggia

=== Tenement at 21 ===
1895-1896

Eclecticism & Neo-classicism

The first landlord at Fröhnerstraße 4 was Robert Böhme, a gardener, who rented the place but did not live there.

The building is one of the first to have been built in the street after the construction of the Specialized school for children in 1872. The facade, although less adorned, echoes the neighbouring one at Nr.19, with Neo-classic features such as the two avant-corps.

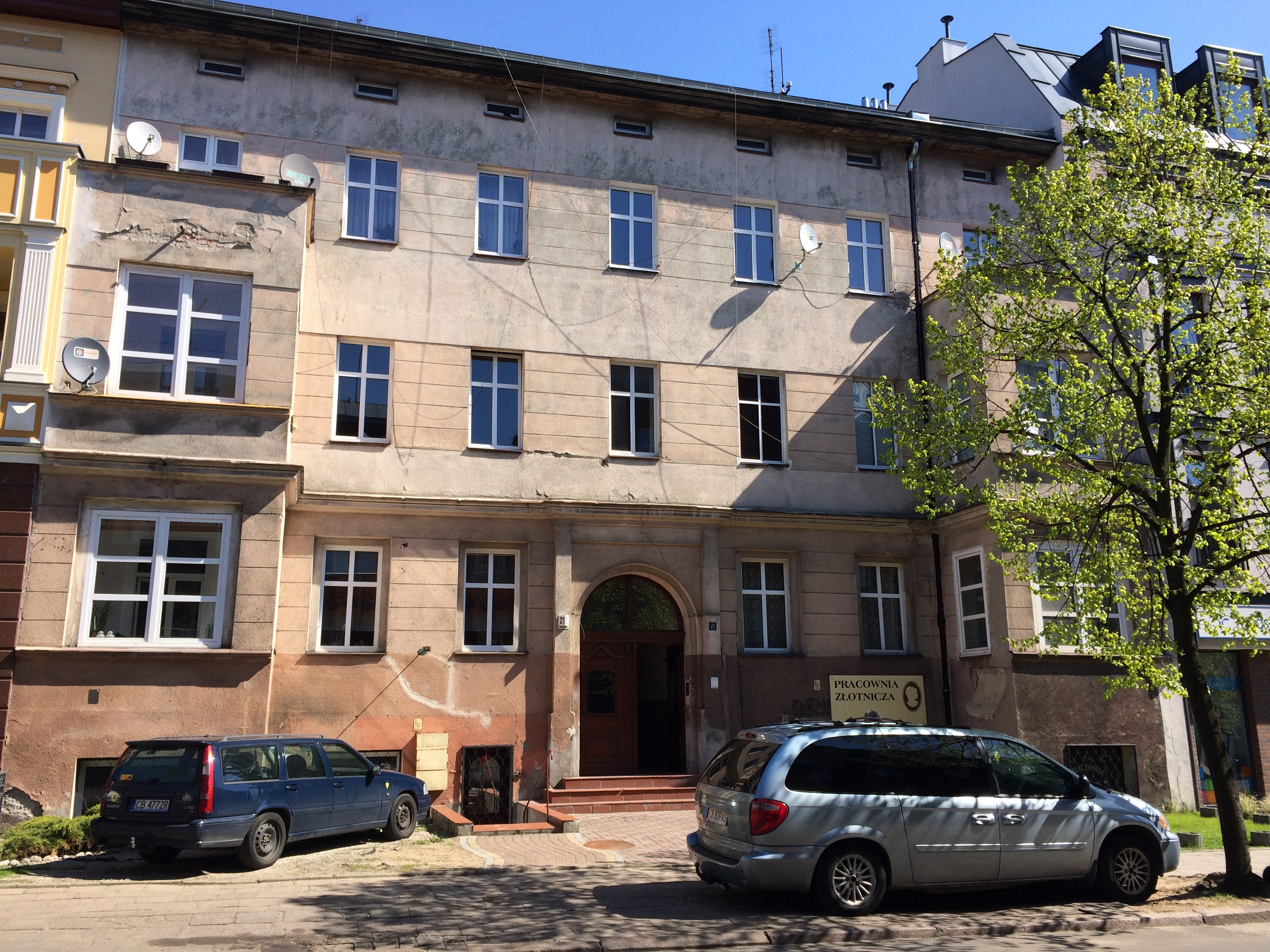
Main elevation

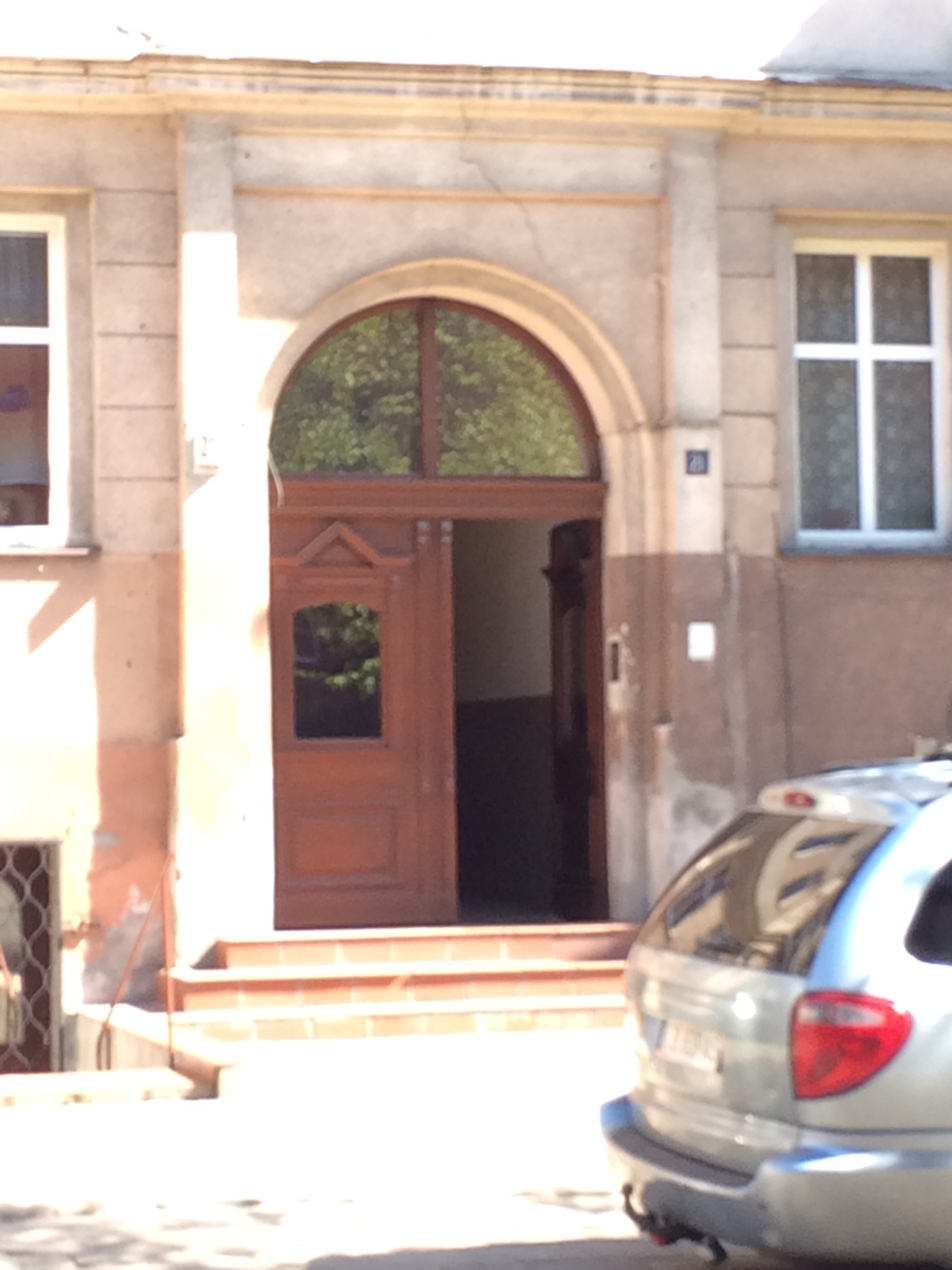
Main gate

=== Tenement at 23 ===
2010, by Budlex

Modern architecture

The plot at then Fröhnerstraße 3 was first owned by Robert Böhme, also landlord of tenement at Nr.21. At the end of World War I, the area has been left abandoned until a first theatre, Paw, was built. It opened on Sunday 8 November 1929 with an 800-seat capacity. It became cinema Appolo in 1931. During World War II, Nazi authorities changed its name to Bidegast. The theatre was renamed Polonia in 1945: it welcomed movies till March 31, 2003.

Since the building's destruction, the plot houses a brand new habitation complex, Rubinowy Dom (Ruby House), since 2010.

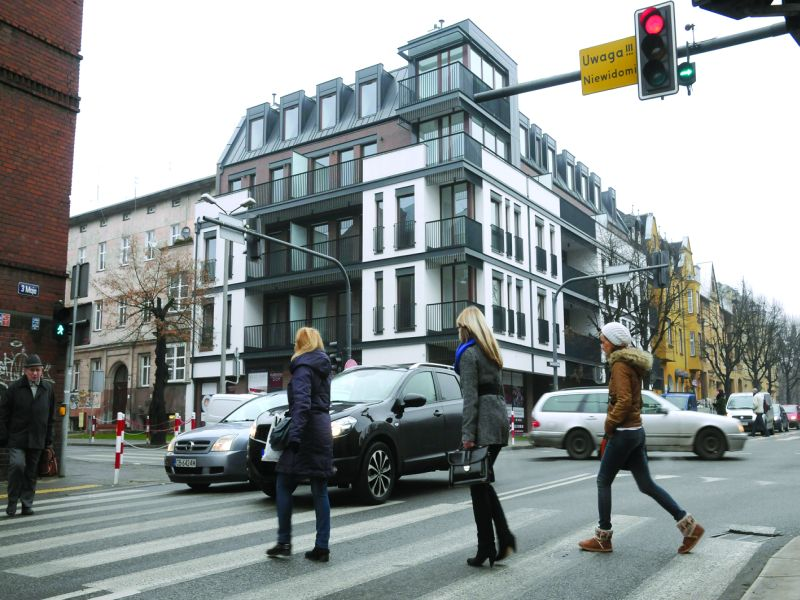
Corner view

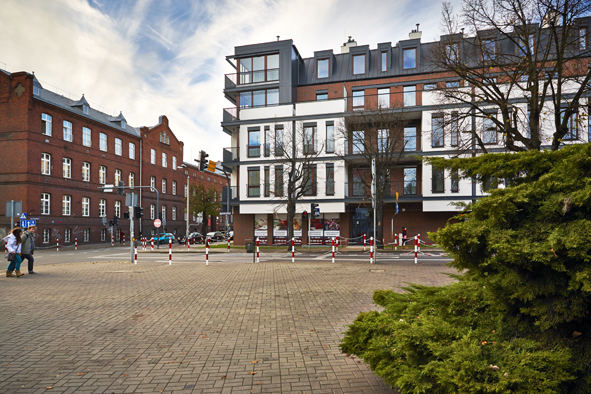
View from the square

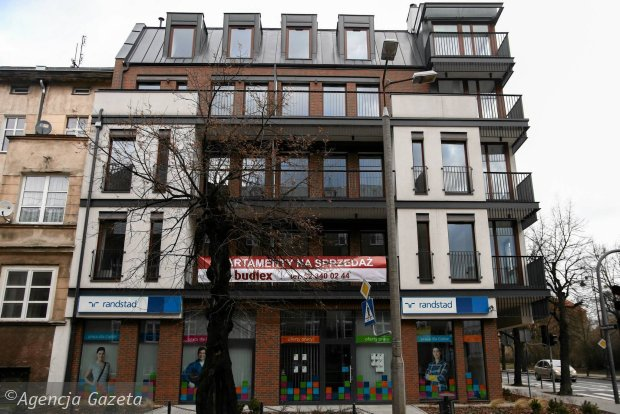
Facade on Krasińskiego street

== See also ==
- Bydgoszcz
- Józef Święcicki
- Bydgoszcz Architects (1850-1970s)

== Bibliography ==
- (in Polish) Bartowski, Krzysztof (1984). Historia szkoły Braillem pisana. Kalendarz Bydgoski. Bydgoszcz: Towarzystwo Miłośników Miasta Bydgoszczy. pp. 33–38.
- (in Polish) Dorota Okońska, Natasza Karpińska (2009). Szkoła brajlem pisana. Kalendarz Bydgoski. Bydgoszcz: Towarzystwo Miłośników Miasta Bydgoszczy.
- (in Polish) Kulpiński, Henryk (1975). Sto lat w służbie niewidomych. Kalendarz Bydgoski. Bydgoszcz: Towarzystwo Miłośników Miasta Bydgoszczy. pp. 192–196.
- (in Polish) Grzybowska, Ewa (1975). Ich drugi dom - Kronika Bydgoska VI. Bydgoszcz: Towarzystwo Miłosnikow Miasta Bydgoszczy - Bydgoskie Towarzystwo Naukowe. pp. 112–119.
