= Pomeranian Philharmonic =

Orchestra in Bydgoszcz, Poland

Ignacy Jan Paderewski Pomeranian Philharmonic
- Polish: Filharmonia Pomorska im. Ignacego Jana Paderewskiego
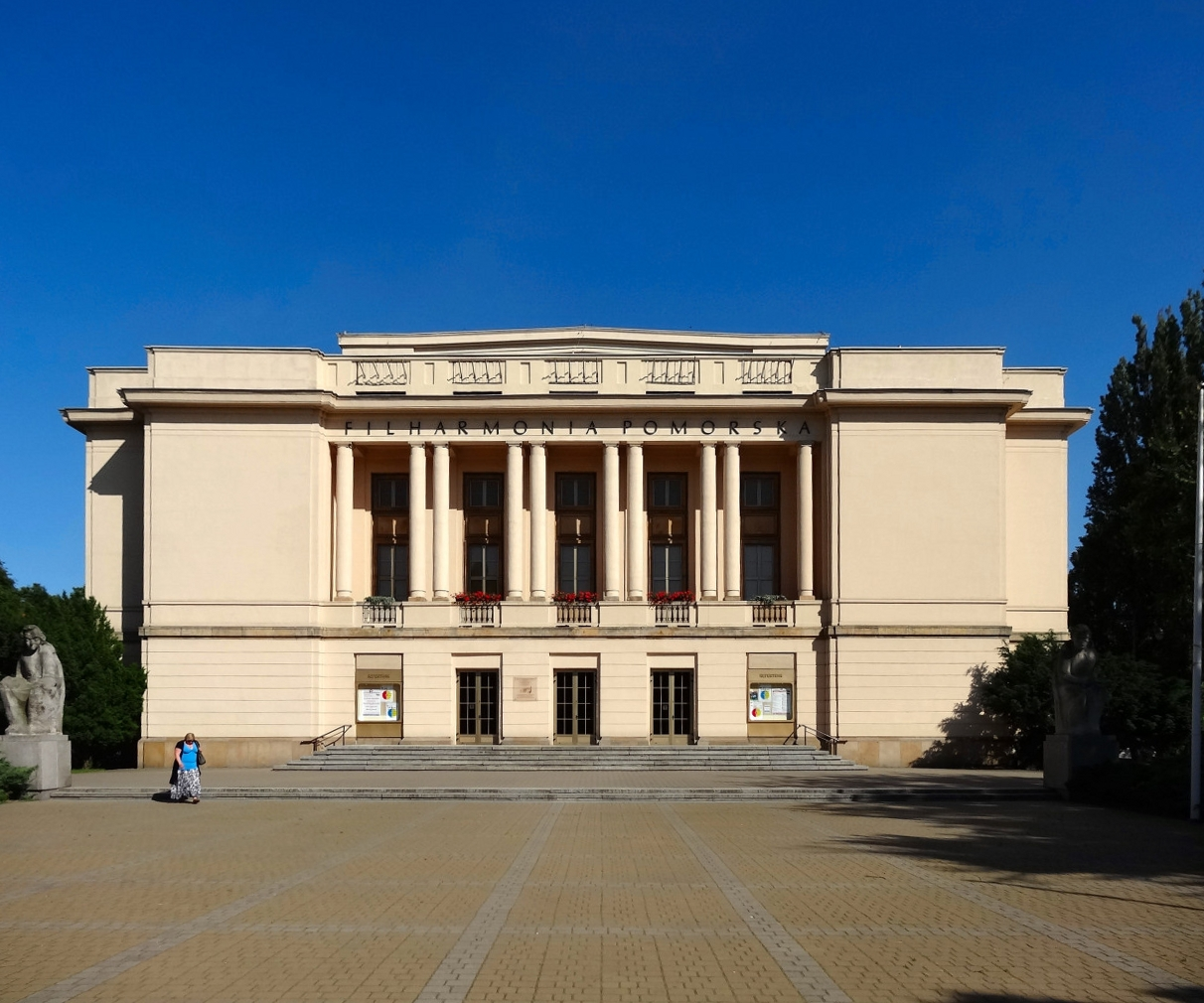
- Pomeranian Philharmonic in Bydgoszcz

General information
- Architectural style: Neoclassicism
- Classification: Nr.601376, Reg.A/269 (January 27, 1978 and December 18, 1981)
- Location: Andrzej Szwalbe Street 6, Bydgoszcz, Poland
- Coordinates: 53°7′44″N 18°00′39″E
- Construction started: 1954
- Completed: 1958
- Client: Pomeranian Philharmonic Symphony Orchestra

Technical details
- Floor count: 2

Design and construction
- Architect: Stefan Klajbor

Website
- filharmonia.bydgoszcz.pl

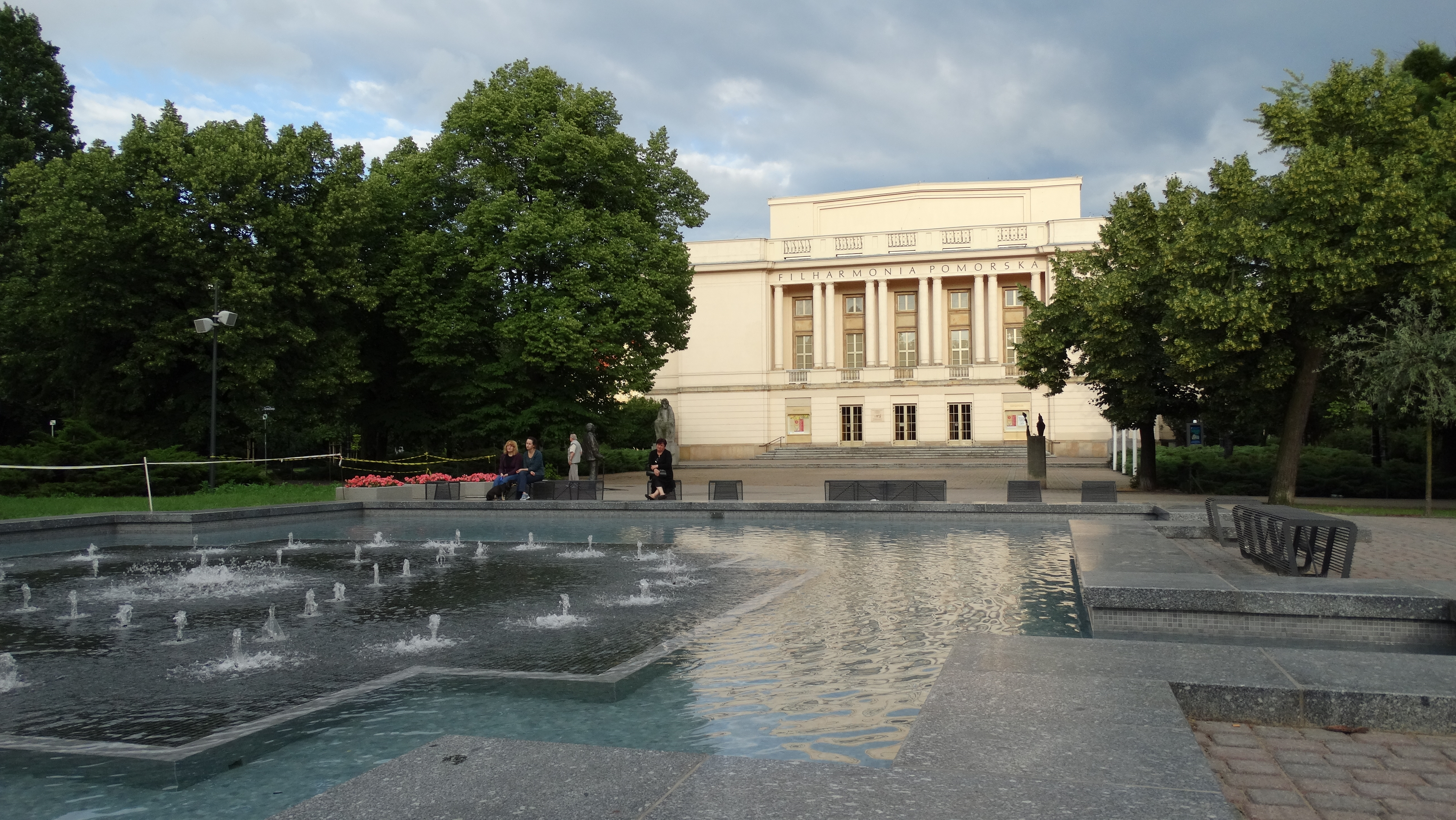
View from fountain square

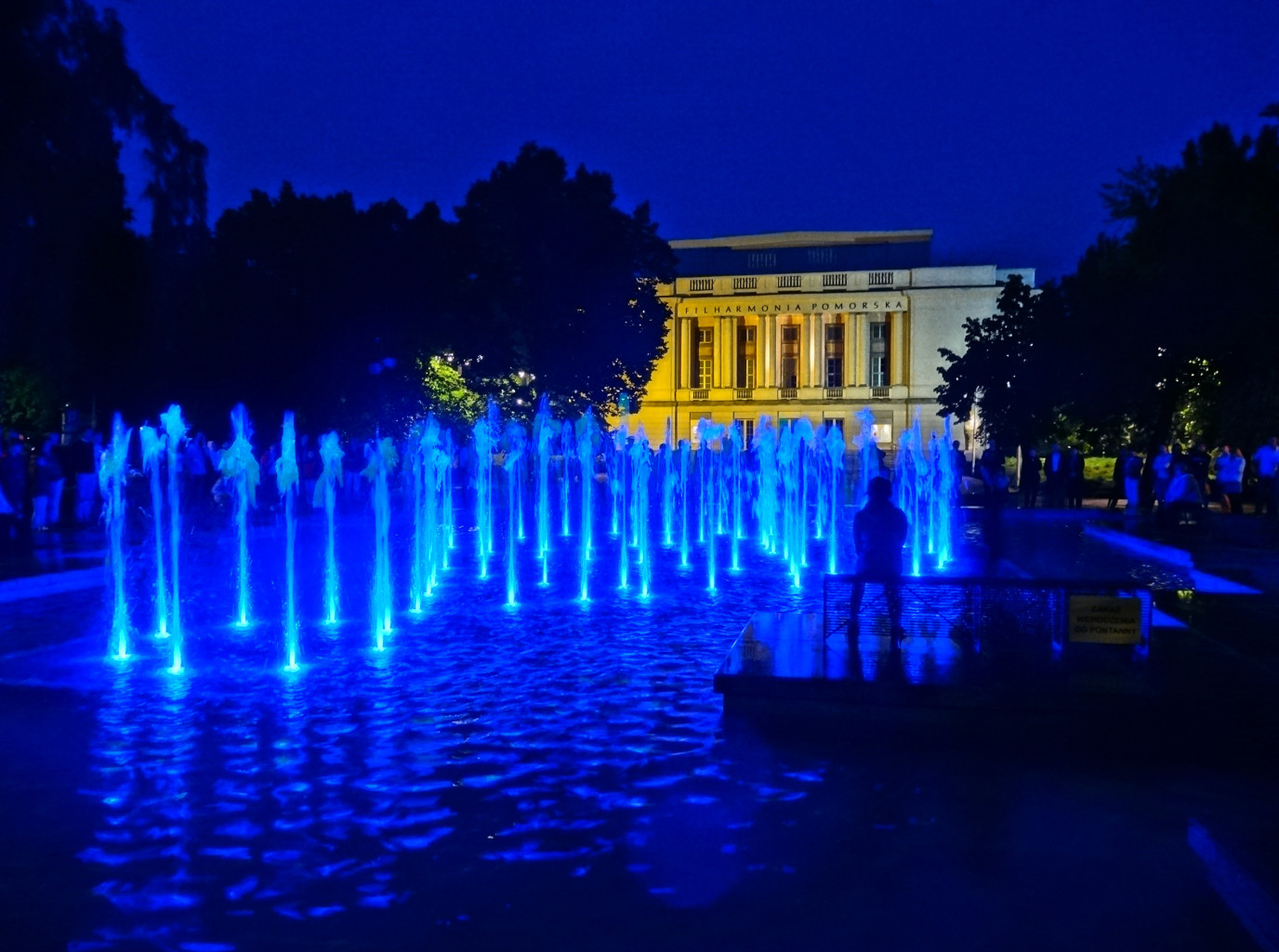
Night view with water-and-light show

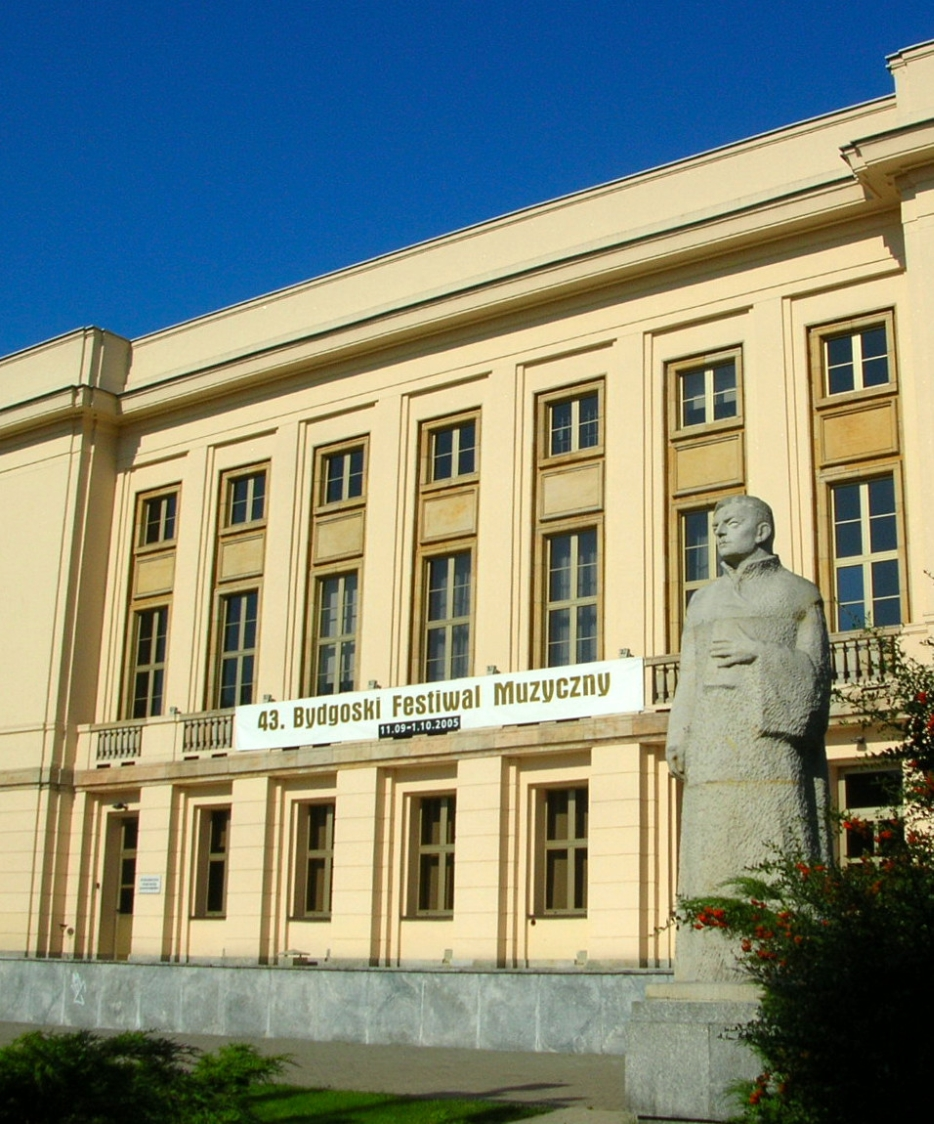
Main façade with statue of Karol Szymanowski

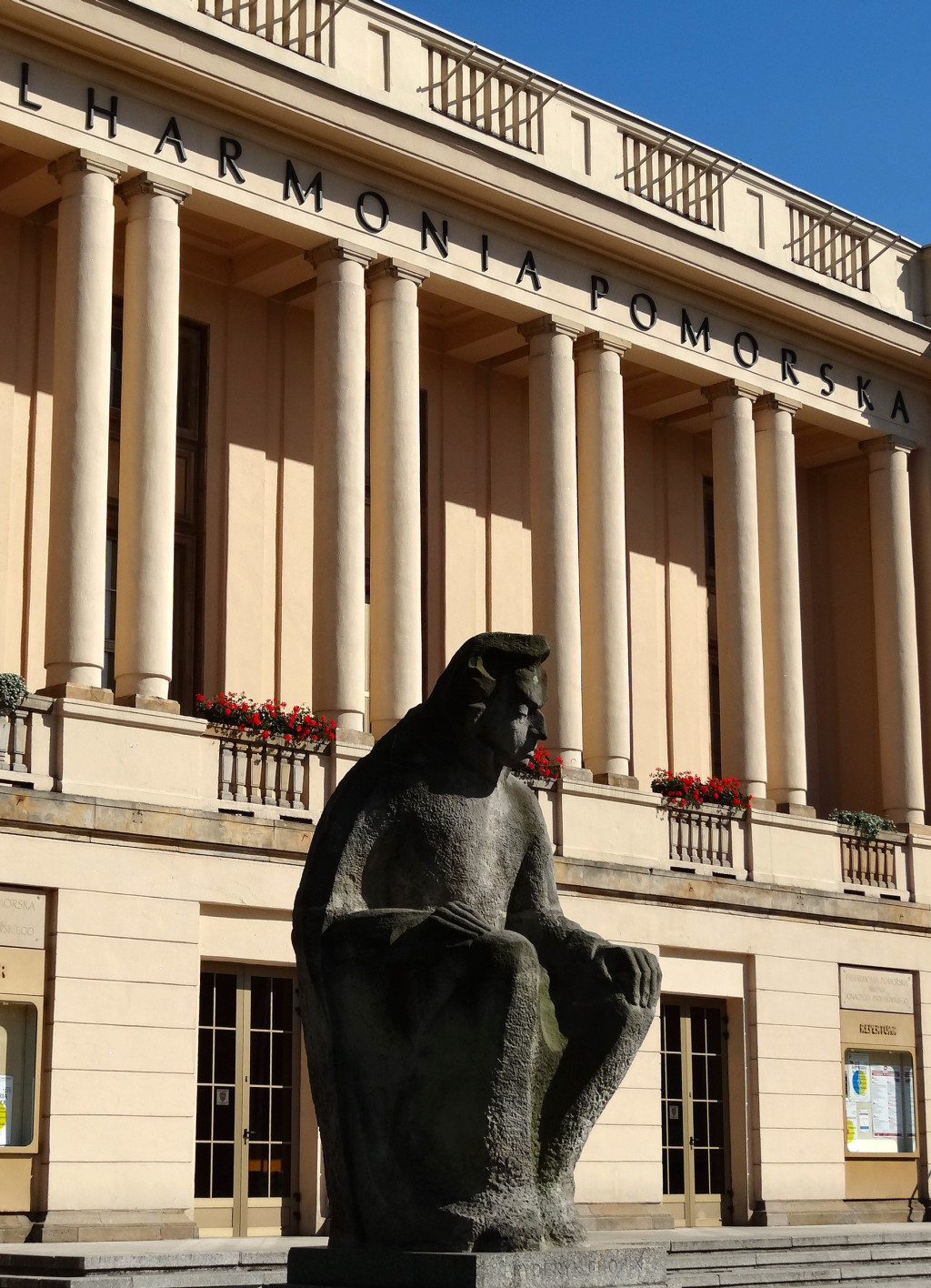
Façade with Chopin statue

The Ignacy Jan Paderewski Pomeranian Philharmonic (Polish: Państwowa Filharmonia Pomorska imienia Ignacego Jana Paderewskiego) is an orchestra in Bydgoszcz, Poland. It has been at its present site since 16 November 1953. It bears the name of Polish pianist and composer Ignacy Jan Paderewski. The Pomeranian Philharmonic is the musical center of Kuyavian-Pomeranian Voivodeship and also features an outdoor art gallery. It is registered on the Kuyavian-Pomeranian Voivodeship Heritage List.

== Location ==
The seat of the Pomeranian Philharmonic is located in downtown Bydgoszcz, in the center of the "Music District". It is surrounded by Jan Kochanowski Park, music schools, and an outdoor gallery of sculptures of composers and virtuoso musicians.

== Characteristics ==
The Pomeranian Philharmonic is a cultural institution which bodies are under the authority of leading Polish Ministry of Culture and National Heritage and Kuyavian-Pomeranian Voivodeship. Performances include symphonic concerts, chamber music, and recitals by virtuosos from all over the world. On stage Philharmonic concerts are accompanied by Polish or foreign groups, to play at the occasion of jubilees, commemorations and congresses organized by universities and private companies. The repertoire includes music of all periods, from medieval to contemporary works.

The acoustics of the concert hall of the Pomeranian Philharmonic is famous for its quality: concert recordings of classical and contemporary music are often performed there.

In 2010, the Pomeranian Philharmonic has carried out in their hall 360 concerts, gathering an audience of 79200 people.

The first director of the Pomeranian Philharmonic was, from 1953 to 1991, Andrzej Szwalbe, who made the orchestra of Bydgoszcz a recognized scene in Europe. Since 1991, director is Eleonora Harendarska.

== History ==
=== Municipal Symphony Orchestra ===
The first initiative related to set up a Pomeranian Philharmonic was the creation of a local Symphony Orchestra able to perform at a high artistic level: in 1922, one section of Bydgoszcz's Music Society had an orchestra section under the direction of Zygmunt Urbanyi. However, despite strenuous efforts, no symphony ensemble was created in the 1920s. In 1924, the Pomeranian Philharmonic Society was an entity consisting of bands from Bydgoszcz, Grudziądz and Toruń. In 1925, an initiative to establish an Orchestra of the Pomeranian Philharmonic Society, composed of professional musicians, failed for public foundings reasons. In this situation, the Bydgoszcz Music Society, until 1930, was the only body organizing regular performances:

- outstanding Polish and foreign artists,
- local military bands,
- Bydgoszcz Conservatoire of Music, conducted by Wilhelm von Winterfeld,
- bands from other cities, such as the orchestra of the Grand Theatre of Poznań.

In January 1936, on the initiative of voluntary musicians, the Bydgoszcz symphony orchestra has been created, soon directed by Wilhelm von Winterfeld. The inaugural concert of the Municipal Symphony Orchestra was held on May 8, 1936 in "Strzelnicy Hall" on Toruńska street. The following year, the orchestra was led by Alfons Rezler, a professor of the Municipal Conservatoire of Music, providing the basis for its organization. In 1938, the Bydgoszcz's Music Society took over the patronage of the orchestra, and the Municipality provided a considerable assistance to the team. World War II and the years of occupation disrupted the orchestra: Alfons Rezler died during the invasion of Poland, many musicians were killed or fled abroad.

=== Pomeranian Symphony Orchestra ===
In 1946, to celebrate the 600th anniversary of the foundation of Bydgoszcz, a new formation, close to the pre-war Symphony Orchestra of the Music Society of Bydgoszcz was created by Arnold Rezler, Jerzy Jasieński, Felicja Krysiewicz and chaired by Witold Miller. It gave its first concert on May 12, 1946, in the hall of the Pomorski House of Arts in Gdańska Street. From 1946 to 1949, the Music society of Bydgoszcz set up the foundations of the organisation and the material, with few interference of the city. During this period the orchestra was called Pomeranian Symphony Orchestra' of the Bydgoszcz Music Society.

Public concerts were held four times a month, with additional ones in schools of Bydgoszcz and of the Voivodeship. Already at that time, initiatives to invite eminent conductors (Witold Rowicki and Bohdan Wodiczko and soloists started (Stanisław Szpinalski, Zbigniew Drzewiecki, Regina Smendzianka, Kazimierz Wiłkomirski, Wanda Wiłkomirska).

In 1949, Mieczyslaw Tomaszewski was nominated as new director: he organized three series of concerts related to Frédéric Chopin (for the centenary of the composer's death), and presented a series of concerts "Music for All" in 26 cities of the Voivodeship. The orchestra was nationalized in November 1950. On September 1, 1951, Andrzej Szwalbe became director of the Pomeranian Philharmonic Orchestra. He soon championed the project of the construction of a specific building for the Philharmonic, to move out of the Pomorski House of Arts in Gdańska Street. Main conductors at this time were, among others, Edward Bury, Tadeusz Wilczak or Robert Satanowski. The inaugural concert of the new symphony orchestra of the State Pomeranian Philharmonic took place on January 9, 1953, in the hall of the Polish Theatre.

In September 1955, the orchestra of the National Pomeranian Philharmonic, numbering 65 musicians, was augmented by disbanded musicians from the Bydgoszcz Polish Radio Orchestra. In the same year the name of the institution was changed to Ignacy Jan Paderewski Pomeranian Philharmonic, earning the esteem of more and more talented graduates of music schools. In 1971, the philharmonic counted more than 100 people. Many of the orchestra musicians began working in music schools of Bydgoszcz and Toruń.

On November 15, 1958, the orchestra performed its first concert in the brand new building of the Pomeranian Philharmonic in Bydgoszcz.

=== Pomeranian Philharmonic ===
In September 1951, Andrzej Szwalbe was appointed director of the Pomeranian Philharmonic Orchestra, which was nationalized in December 1952. On January 1, 1953, the orchestra was renamed National Pomeranian Philharmonic. By February 1953, there were attempts to have a new philharmonic concert hall constructed. Thanks to the efforts of the Social Committee for the Philharmonic Building, the cornerstone laying ceremony of the edifice at 16 Libelta street took place on June 26, 1954. The concert hall's construction was completed in the autumn of 1958. The new building was spacious, conveniently located, and, most importantly, acoustically sound. On November 16, 1958 a gala concert marking the opening of the new building was held, led by Zbigniew Chwedczuk.

Thanks to Andrzej Szwalbe's work, 1961 witnessed the first musical event on a national scale, the "Ignacy Jan Paderewski International Piano Competition" (Polish: Międzynarodowy Konkurs Pianistyczny im. Ignacego Jana Paderewskiego). Each year since then, a "Bydgoszcz Music Festival" has been organized.

The acoustics of the concert hall have drawn artists from around the world to Bydgoszcz, including Witold Małcużyński (1959), Arthur Rubinstein (1960), David Oistrakh (1961), Benjamin Britten (1961), Sviatoslav Richter (1963), Arthur Moreira Lima (1965), Bernard Ringeissen (1965), Ruggiero Ricci (1969), Garrick Ohlsson (1973), Grigori Zhislin (1977), Eugen Indjic, Vadim Brodsky, Stanislav Bunin (1986), Luciano Pavarotti (1964), Halina Czerny-Stefańska, Maurizio Pollini, Wanda Wiłkomirska, Teresa Żylis-Gara, Krystian Zimerman, Konstanty Andrzej Kulka, George Byrd, Shlomo Mintz, Mischa Maisky, Kevin Kenner, Kurt Masur, Kazimierz Kord, Jerzy Maksymiuk, Antoni Wit. Among the conductors, we one can mention: Leopold Stokowski (1960), Aram Khachaturian (1962), Carlo Zecchi (1967), Emil Gilels (1967), Arvīds Jansons. The Symphonic Orchestra toured well-known orchestra halls worldwide, in places like New York City, Beijing, Paris, Berlin and Moscow.

The music ensemble Capella Bydgostiensis was founded at the Philharmonic in 1962. The chamber orchestra is best known for its recordings of Polish classical music. In 1966, Andrej Szwalbe organized, in cooperation with the Bydgoszcz Scientific Society and the Department of Musicology of the University of Warsaw, the first festival of ancient music "Musica Antiqua Europae Orientalis". Recurring every three years, it is now a well-known event in the international musical scene. From 1963 to 1967, the Pomeranian Philharmonic hosted the Festival of Polish Music, later revamped into "Bydgoszcz Music Festival".

As a homage to his major contributions to the development of the Philharmonic and his outstanding cultural role, Andrej Szwalbe was nominated "Honorary Citizen of Bydgoszcz". One of his major contributions is the inception of the "music district", surrounding the building of the Philharmonic Music and comprising the Feliks Nowowiejski Music Academy and the sculpture gallery of composers and virtuosos. In the 1970s, an organ-shaped fountain was constructed in the front square of the Philharmonic.

== Philharmonic building ==
=== History ===
Pomeranian Philharmonic building has been built in the Polish vogue style in the 1940s and 1950s, which is a mix of functionalism, Neoclassical architecture, Renaissance architecture, Baroque architecture and Rococo. The external architecture reveals itself especially neoclassical, displaying seriousness and moderation to illustrate the social importance of the institutions housed there. The originator and effective executor of the building was director of the Philharmonic Andrzej Szwalbe. On March 24, 1953, the Presidium of the Provincial Council in consultation with the Central Board of Opera, Philharmonic Hall and Musical Institutions in Warsaw adopted a resolution allowing the construction of the building. Initial draft were prepared by a team led by the architect Jan Kossowki, who at the time already worked on several projects in Bydgoszcz (Freedom Monument, buildings in Jagiellońska street and Gdańska Street). Many locations were identified: People Park, Jan Kochanowski park, Copernicus square or Leszek the White square. The selected area was the location of former tennis courts at Słowackiego street. The jury, chaired by professor Piotr Biegański who co-led the reconstruction Old and New Town of Warsaw, elected the team headed by:

- architect Stefan Klajbor (who realized a building in Jagiellońska street),
- designer Bogdan Piestrzyński,
- acoustics designer Witold Straszewicz of Warsaw University of Technology.

Construction began in February 1954, under the supervision of Zbigniew Arciszewski from Gdansk University of Technology. The construction was financed by the "Social Reconstruction Fund of the Capital". The building site was twice inspected by a delegation of Soviet builders from Warsaw's Palace of Culture and Science in September 1954 and January 1955. The building was erected using Polish building materials, with the help of Polish engineering and manpower. The interior decor was designed by a team of artists from Toruń–Stefan Zarębski, Joseph Kozlowski and Jozef Kowalczyk–, wood panelling prepared by Bydgoszcs's Furniture Factory, railings by Blacksmith craftmen from Gdańsk and chandelier by Szklarska Poręba glassworks which provided chandeliers for Warsaw Palace of Culture and Science.

Particular attention was paid to the concert hall's acoustics. The main hall has an amphitheater slope. Over the stage, acoustic reflectors are placed on the back wall, and the whole interior is paneled in order to obtain balanced reverberation time through the entire frequency spectrum. Acoustic effects of this arena amazes even professionals. In a letter to the then Minister of Foreign Affairs Adam Rapacki, Andrzej Szwalbe stated:

"acoustics were able to reach excellence. There is nothing to be ashamed of with regards to the East or the West [...] "

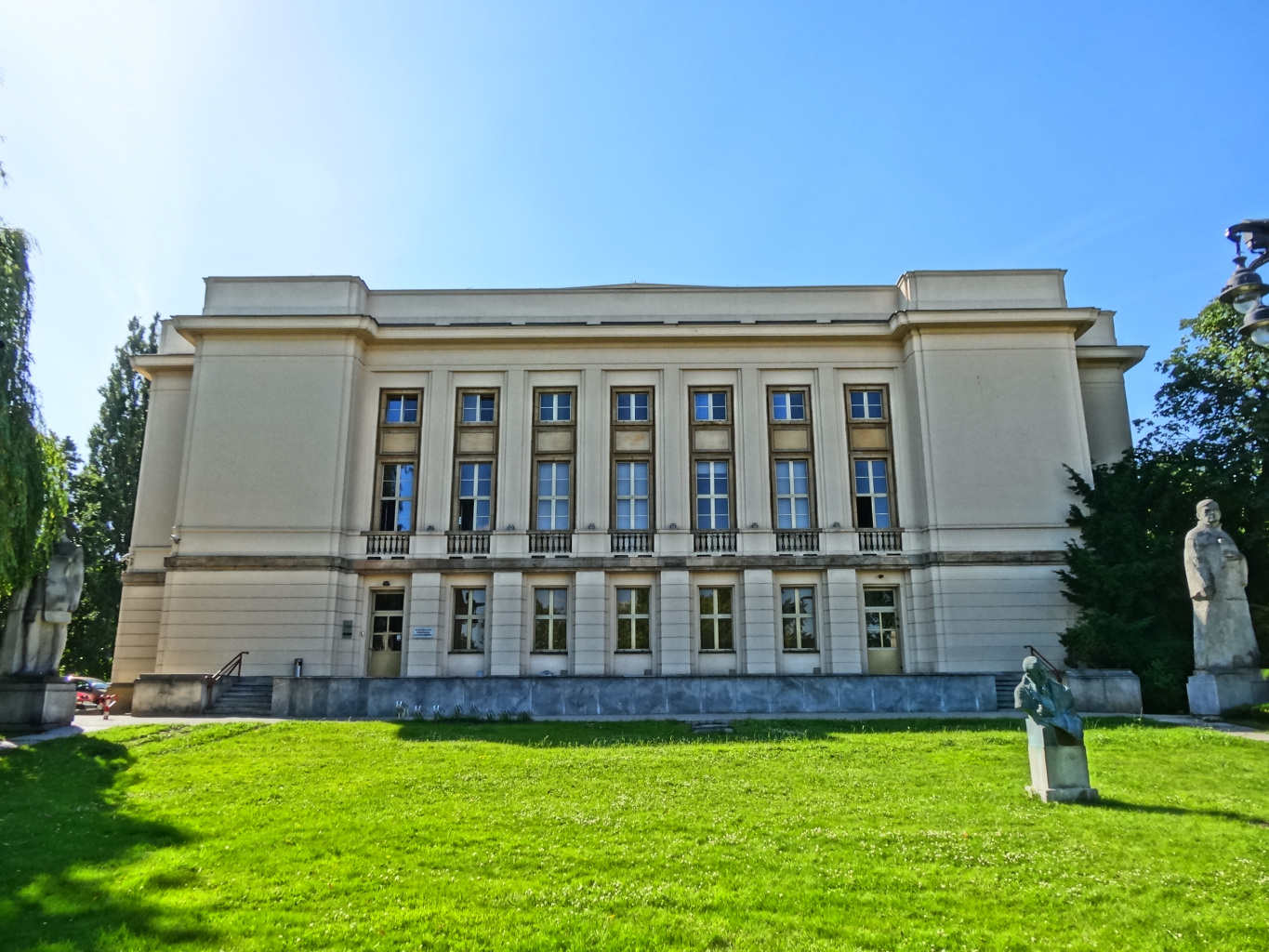
East façade

=== Architecture ===
The building is an 18m high regular structure with dimensions of 35m by 45m, reminding willingly the features of the Warsaw Philharmonic building rebuilt at the same period (1955). The main elevation is mounted on a pedestal. The central part of the frontage displays a two-storey high colonnade, joined at its bottom by baluster railings. Facades are topped with attic style cornices with wire mesh walls. Terraces are available between each façade colonnades.

Inside are two concert halls:

- the main one called "Arthur Rubinstein Hall" with an 880 seats capacity
- a smaller one called "Mikołaj Zieleński hall" with 195 seats.

Early in the 1950s, live broadcast occurred thanks to Kuyavian-Pomeranian Voivodeship radio resources, airing both intimate recordings, as well as great symphony orchestra concerts with a choir, with up to 300 people. Around the buildings are displayed sculptures, part of the outdoor monument gallery.

The Pomeranian Philharmonic building has been registered on the Kuyavian-Pomeranian Voivodeship Heritage List Nr.601376 Reg.A/269 on January 27, 1978 and December 18, 1981.

=== Acoustics ===
The main concert hall of the Pomeranian Philharmonic is classified as acoustically one of the best in Europe, as confirmed by well-known artists and music critics. In the background of the main concert hall is set up a mechanical organ produced by the firm Rieger–Kloss from Krnov, Czech Republic in 1977. The chamber hall is equipped with an organ made by the establishment of Stefan Truszczyński from Włocławek. There is also a large collection of concert keyboards, pianos and harpsichords.

The Pomeranian Philharmonic is renowned for its acoustics, attracting well-known artists and regularly hosting professional recording sessions for music publishers. Poland’s first 24-karat gold audio Compact Disc was produced here.

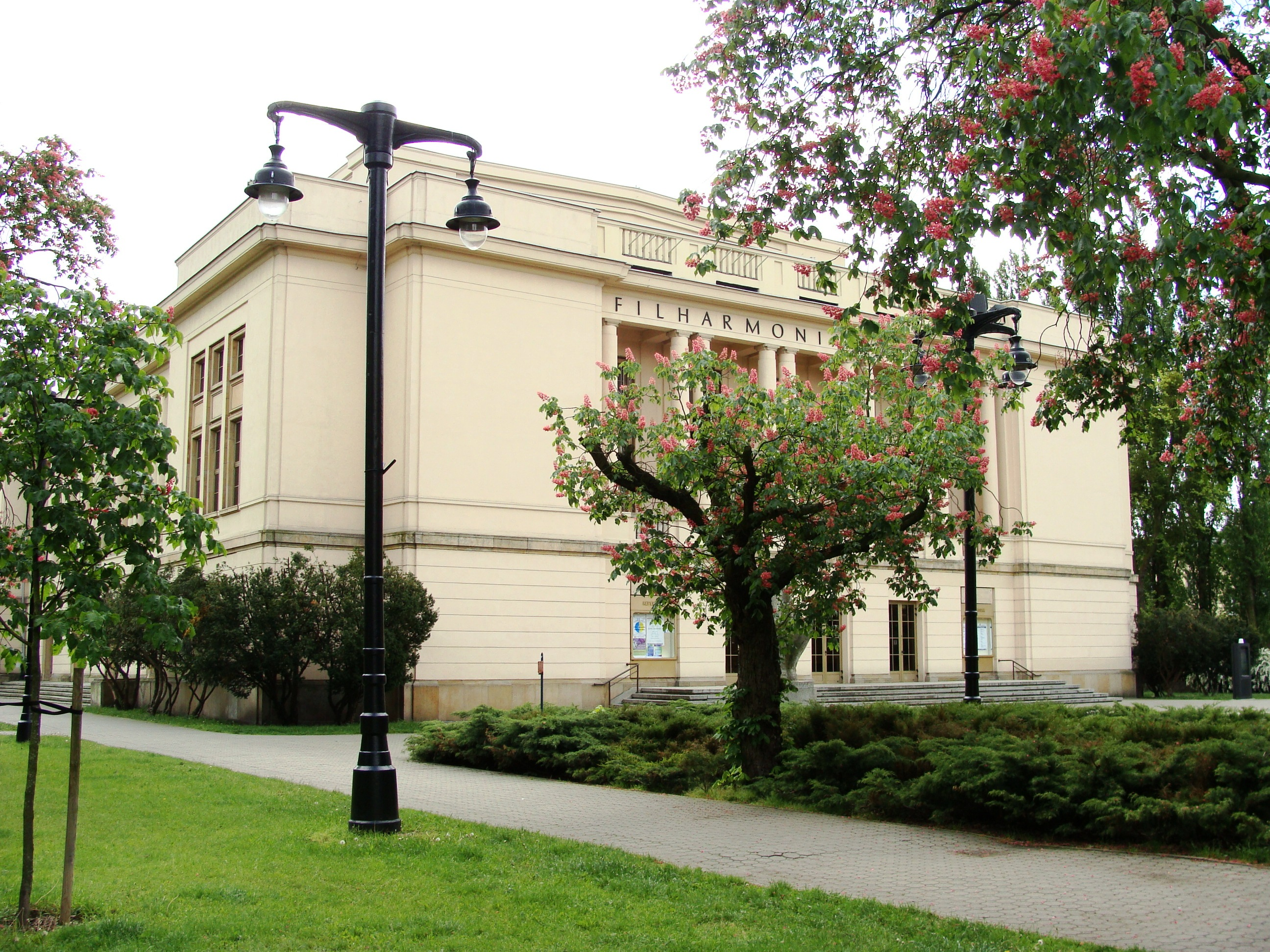
Southwest corner

=== Interior ===
The Pomeranian Philharmonic has a large collection of art works that are exhibited in the lobby and halls: sculptures, paintings and graphic/textile art works.

The Gallery of Composers Portraits provides an overview of contemporary sculptures. Works have been realized by authors such as: Adam Myjak, Kazimierz Gustaw Zemła, Barbara Zbrożyna, Marian Konieczny, Alfons Karny, Ryszard Wojciechowski or Michał Kubiak. Among the artists portrayed are Frédéric Chopin, Ignacy Jan Paderewski, Mieczysław Karłowicz, Karol Szymanowski, Ludomir Różycki, Józef Koffler, Artur Malawski, Bolesław Szabelski, Witold Małcużyński, Wojciech Kilar, Henryk Górecki, Arthur Rubinstein, Tadeusz Baird, Stefan Kisielewski, Krzysztof Penderecki, Witold Lutosławski.

In the first floor lobby are paintings and graphics of contemporary Polish authors: Jerzy Nowosielski, Zdzisław Beksiński, Jan Tarasin, Władysław Hasior and others.

The Gallery of tapestries includes about 30 tapestries woven from 1983 to 1992 by the traditional manufactories of Gdańsk and Zakopane. Their authors are painters like Mieczysław Olszewsk, Kiejstut Bereźnicki, Kazimierz Ostrowski, Jerzy Zabłocki, Tadeusz Brzozowski, Kazimierz Śramkiewicz. The collection consists of 5 thematic cycles:

- (I) Polish Concert (I, stands in the main lobby and presents historical aspects of Poland history),
- (II) Harmony of the Spheres and the Mare Nostrum,
- (III) Plants and Animals,
- (IV) Concert Zapustny,
- (V) Grotesque.

First tapestries measuring 4m by 2.5 m, designed by Gdańsk artists, have been hung on the walls of the lobby in 1983. Part of the collection adorned the Polish pavilion at the Seville Expo '92 World's fair.

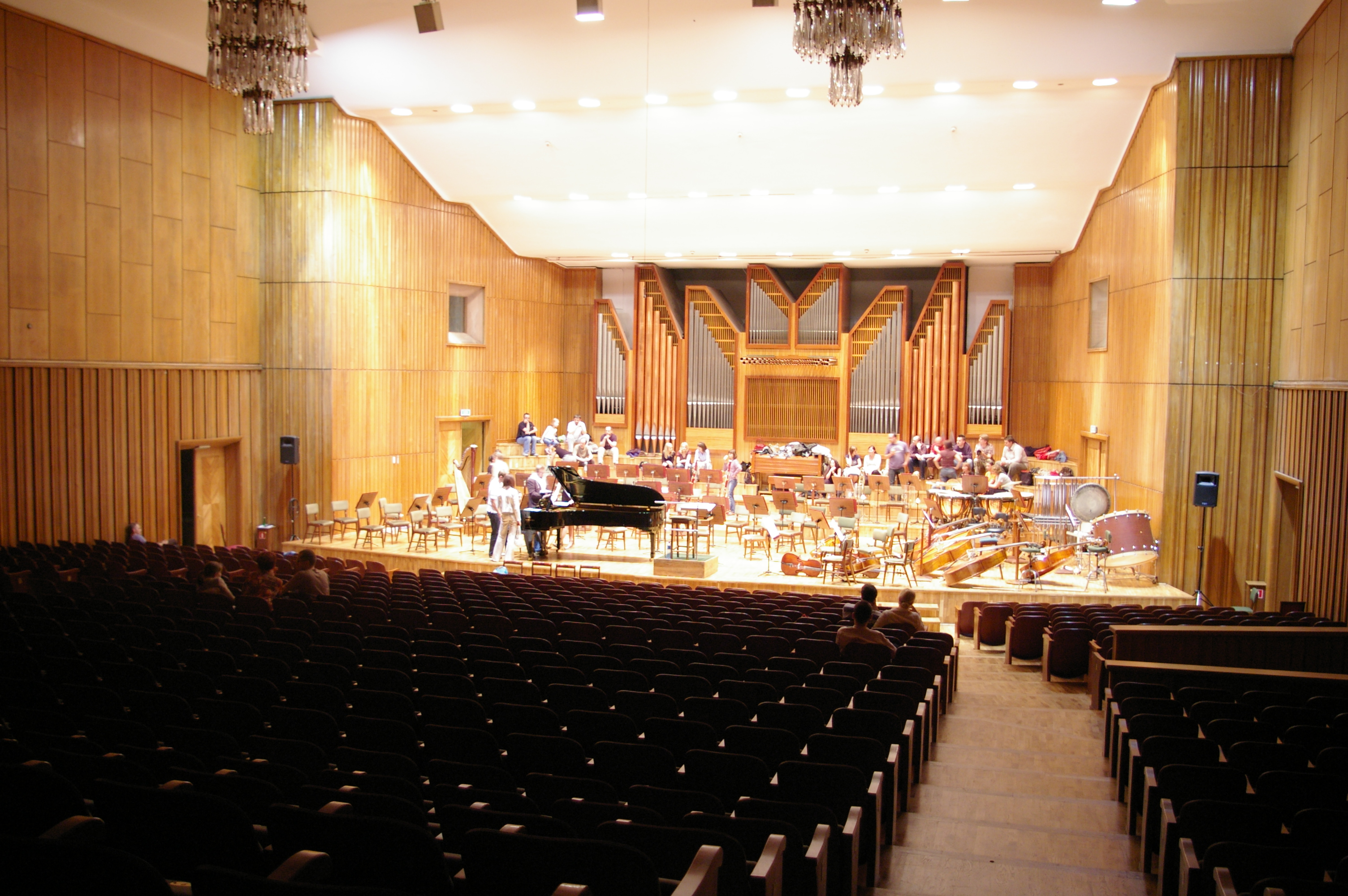
Main hall rehearsal

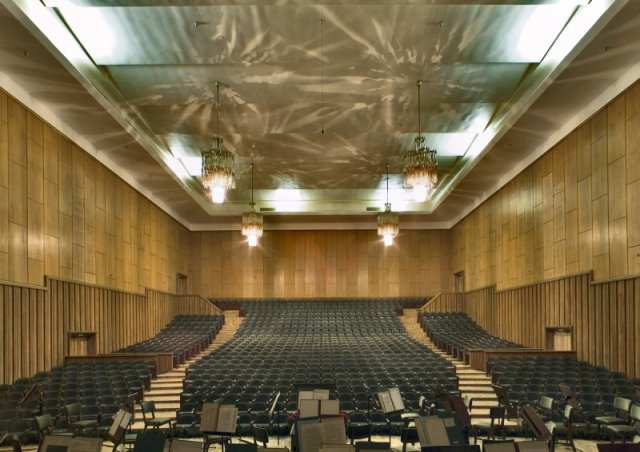
Main concert hall

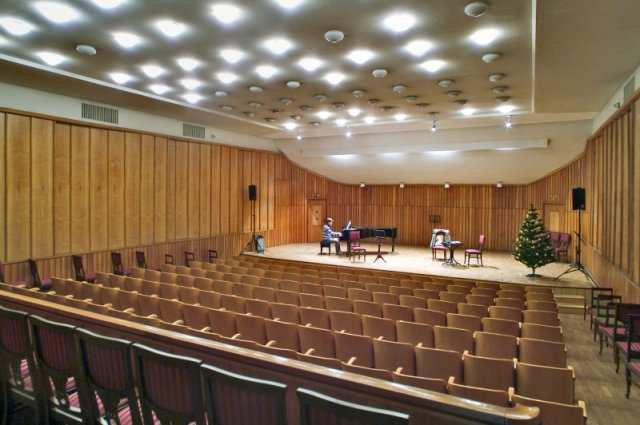
Chambre music hall

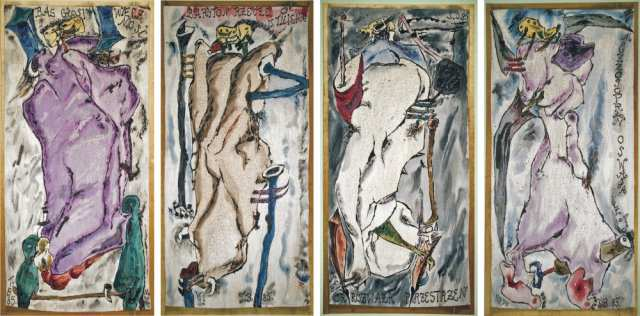
Tapissery Concert Zapustny by Tadeusz Brzozowski: (left to right) "Bass, eternity" "Baritone, existence" "Tenor, space" "Mezzo-soprano, time"

=== Collections ===
The Piano Collection of the Pomeranian Philharmonic comprises 54 instruments. These are historical instruments, mainly from the 19th century: pianos, clavichords, player pianos and harmonichords coming from Paris, Berlin, Leipzig, Saint Petersburg, London, Vienna, Cologne, Riga, Stuttgart, Warsaw, Kraków, Gdańsk, Wrocław, Kalisz and Bydgoszcz. Purchases of these instruments began in 1970, under the direction of Andrzej Szwalbe. The first instrument was a piano winger, from Kaliningrad firm "Gebauhr" (ca 1875). The oldest exhibit is a table piano for children, produced by Vienna company "Nurnberg Amberberga" (ca 1800). One of the instrument of 1890 has been donated by composer Zygmunt Noskowski. Other exhibits worth mentioning are: a Parisian harmonichord, an English player piano, table pianos playing a record of Janczarski (drums and bells), pianos from Bydgoszcz factory "Bruno Sommerfeld" located from 1905 to 1945 in Dworcowa Street. In 1985, pianos were moved to Ostromecko Palace, but due to renovation, they were stored in warehouses. In 1999 a concept exhibition have been realized in the musical instruments museum in Bydgoszcz.

The collection in Ostromecko Palace is now reopened as "The Andrzej Szwalbe Collection".

The Harpsichord Collection has been established in 1976, by director Andrzej Szwalbe who was inspired by the activity of the band "Capella Bydgostiensis" specialized in playing on Early music instruments. In the 1970s, four harpsichords, replicas of 16th-18th centuries French and Flemish historical instruments, were brought from the United States. In the 1980s harpsichordists from across Poland played on these instruments, documenting their recording with the Polskie Radio. Later on, Bydgoszcz collection ushered in a new era for the executive practice of harpsichord in Poland.

== Sculpture gallery ==
The Sculpture gallery of composers and virtuosos consists of busts and monuments located in the interiors and surroundings of the Pomeranian Philharmonic building.

=== History ===
This gallery has been created with the initiative of Andrzej Szwalbe, the longtime manager of the Pomeranian Philharmonic.

The ensemble comprises two parts:

- Interior gallery, inside the building;
- Outdoor gallery with portraits, busts and statues of world music greatest composers world music, placed in the Jan Kochanowski Park around the building of the Philharmonic.

The nature and objectives of the whole gallery were designed by Andrzej Szwalbe. In the course of several years he held the unveiling of monuments with participation of the living artists in the halls and corridors of the Pomeranian Philharmonic, generally associated with special concerts. Gallery is a review of Polish sculpture from the late 1950s to the 1990s: each work reveals specific characteristics of its sculptor and the original psychological approach of each character.

==== Indoor gallery ====
Inside the building of the Pomeranian Philharmonic are placed the following busts:

- Ignacy Jan Paderewski (granite) by Alfons Karny (1958);
- Mieczysław Karłowicz (gypsum) by Alfons Karny (1959);
- Karol Szymanowski (concrete) – by Alfons Karny (1959);
- Krzysztof Penderecki (bronze) – by Marian Konieczny (1979);
- Wojciech Kilar (bronze) – by Jan Kucz (1979);
- Henryk Mikołaj Górecki (bronze) – by Ryszard Wojciechowski (1979);
- Bolesław Szabelski – by Kazimierz Gustaw Zemła (1979-1980);
- Michał Spisak (bronze) – by Jan Kucz (1980);
- Henryk Mikołaj Górecki (bronze) – by Jan Kucz (1980);
- Witold Lutosławski (bronze) – by Barbara Zbrożyna (1980);
- Anna Maria Klechniowska – by Ludwika Nitschowa (1980);
- Tadeusz Baird – by Andrzej Kasten;
- Artur Malawski – by Adam Myjak;
- Emil Młynarski – by Wiktor Gajda;
- Artur Rubinstein – by Ryszard Wojciechowski;
- Stefan Kisielewski – by Michał Kubiak (1994);
- Andrzej Szwalbe – by Michał Kubiak (1996);
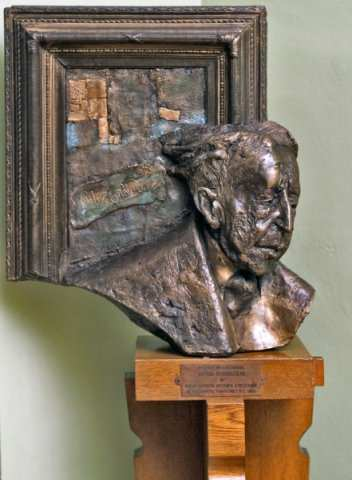
Bust of Arthur Rubinstein by Ryszard Wojciechowski

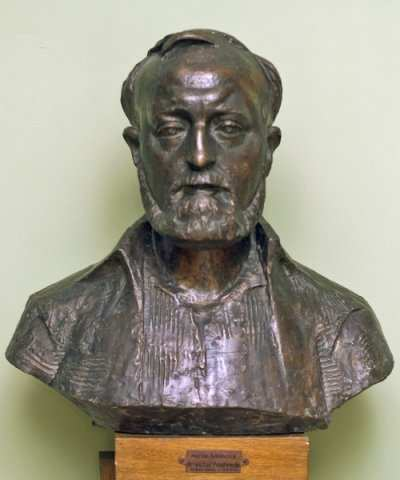
Bust of Krzysztof Penderecki by Marian Konieczny, 1979

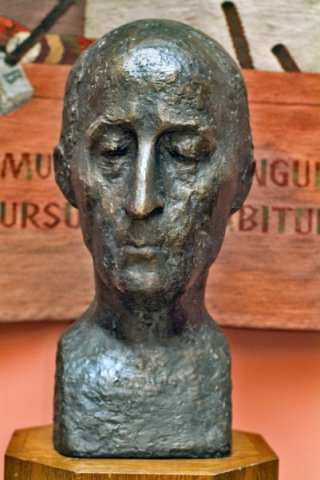
Bust of Witold Lutosławski by Barbara Zbrożyna, 1980

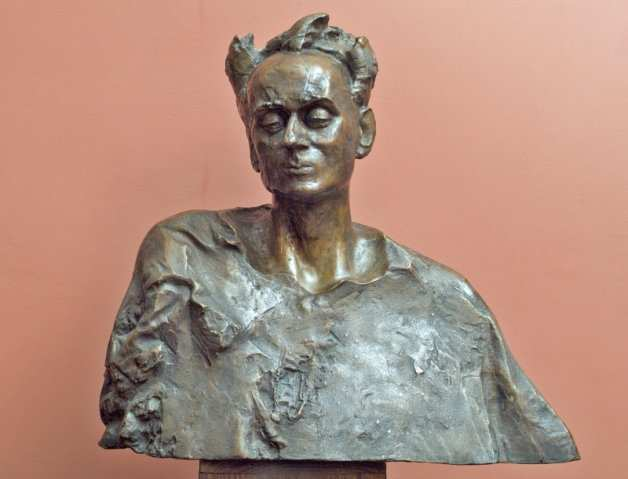
Bust of Wojciech Kilar by Jan Kucz, 1979

==== Outdoor gallery ====
The area around the Pomeranian Philharmonic building is called "the Music District". Jan Kochanowski Park features 15 monuments (10 statues and 5 busts) of composers and virtuoso musicians. The first monuments, to Chopin and Paderewski, were placed in 1973–75.

Monuments:

- Grażyna Bacewicz, statue in stone by Ewelina & Henryk Szczech-Siwicka;
- Johann Sebastian Bach, bust in bronze by Witold Marciniak;
- Ludwig van Beethoven, statue in bronze by Witold Marciniak;
- Frédéric Chopin, statue in stone by Józef Makowski;
- Claude Debussy, bust in bronze by Andrzej Kasten;
- Antonín Dvořák, bust in bronze by Witold Marciniak;
- Mieczysław Karłowicz, statue in stone by Henryk Rasmus;
- Karol Kurpiński, statue in bronze by Ewelina & Henryk Szczech-Siwicka;
- Stanisław Moniuszko, statue in stone by Witold Marciniak;
- Ignacy Jan Paderewski, statue in stone by Józef Makowski;
- Sviatoslav Richter, bust in bronze;
- Ludomir Różycki, bust in bronze by Mieczysław Welter;
- Igor Stravinsky, bust in bronze by Barbara Zbrożyna;
- Andrzej Szwalbe, statue in bronze by Michał Kubiak;
- Karol Szymanowski, statue in stone by Ewelina & Henryk Szczech-Siwicka;
- Pyotr Ilyich Tchaikovsky, statue in bronze by Ewelina & Henryk Szczech-Siwicka;
- Henryk Wieniawski, statue in stone by Ewelina & Henryk Szczech-Siwicka.
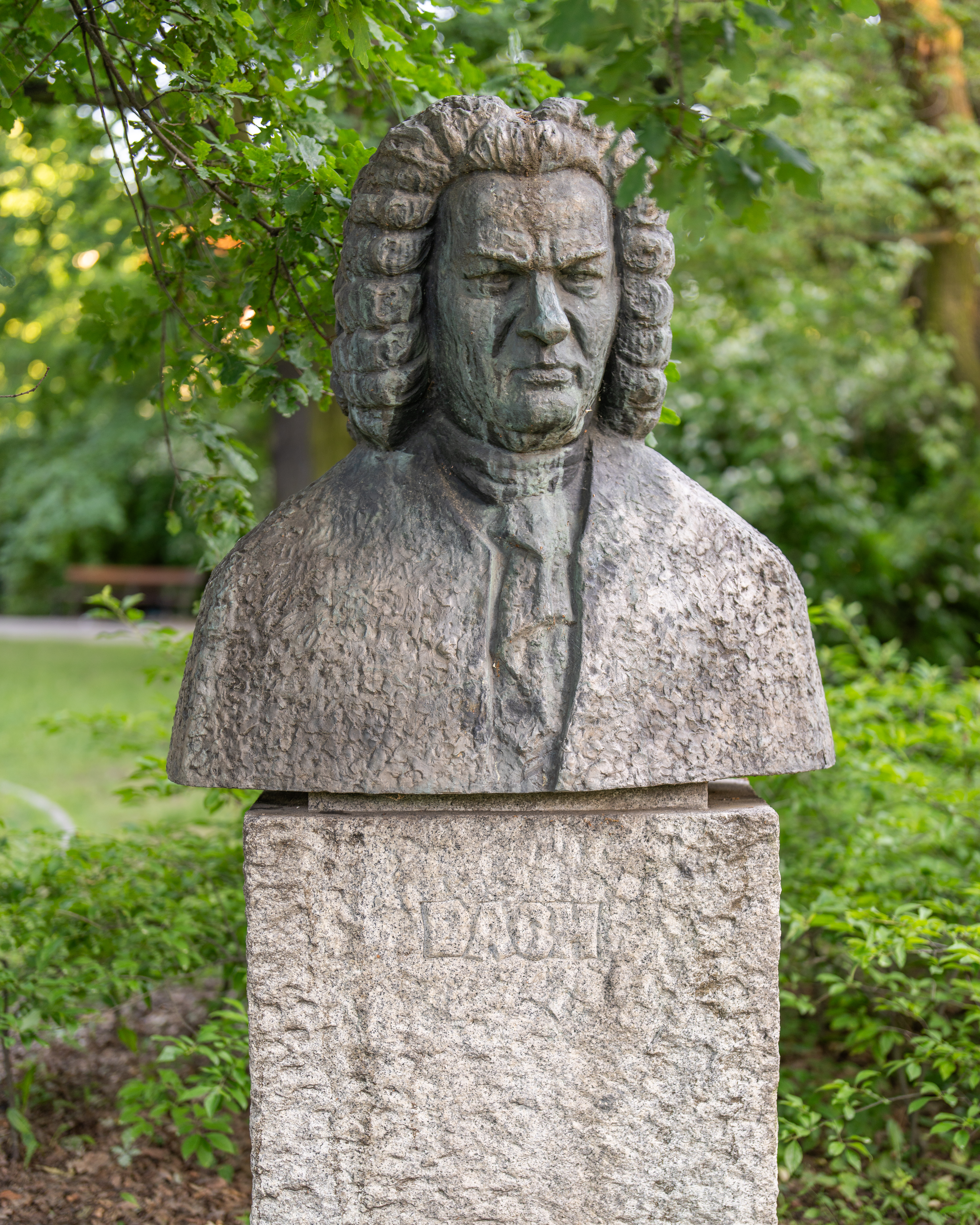
Johann Sebastian Bach, by Witold Marciniak

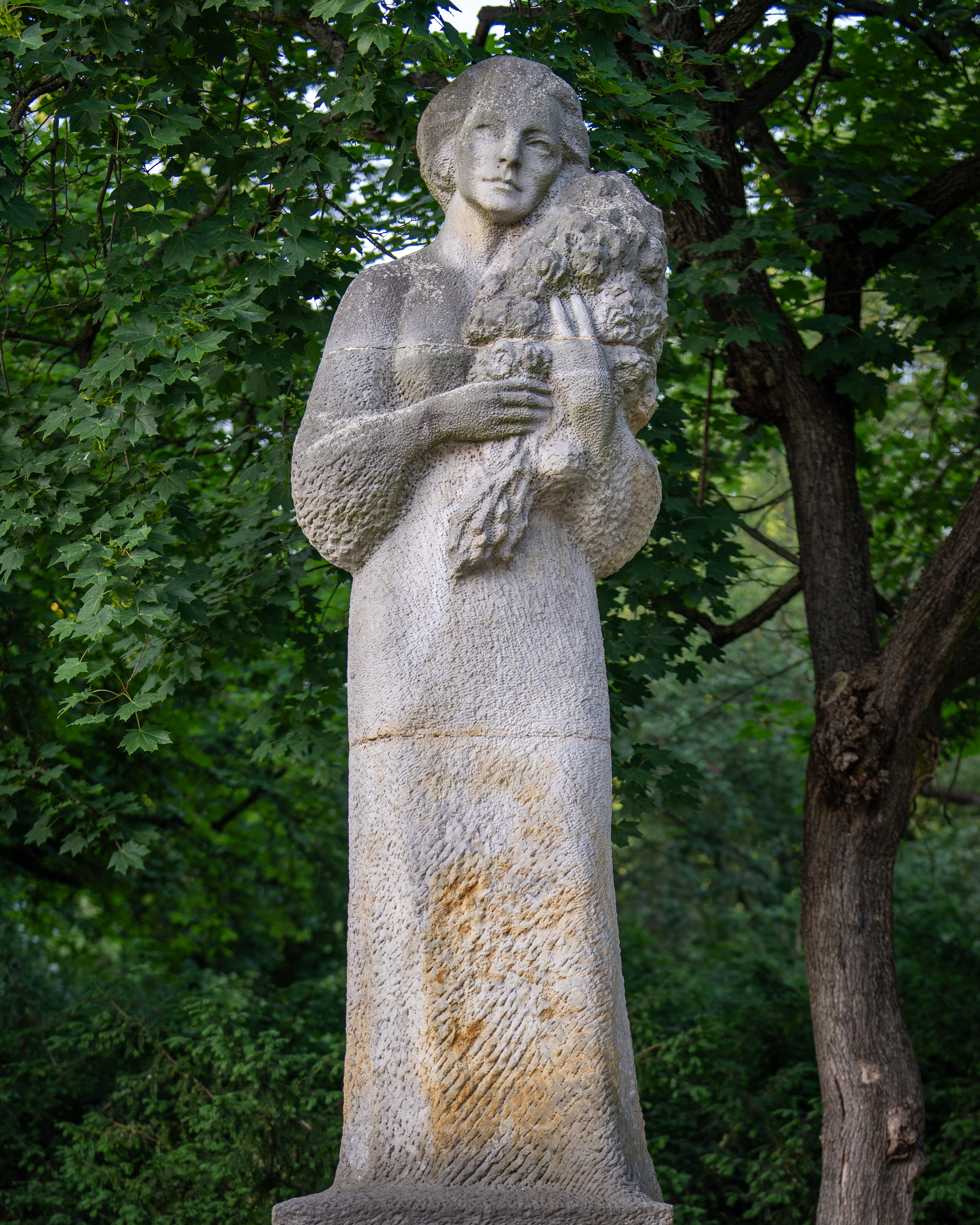
Bacewicz, by Ewelina & Henryk Szczech-Siwicka

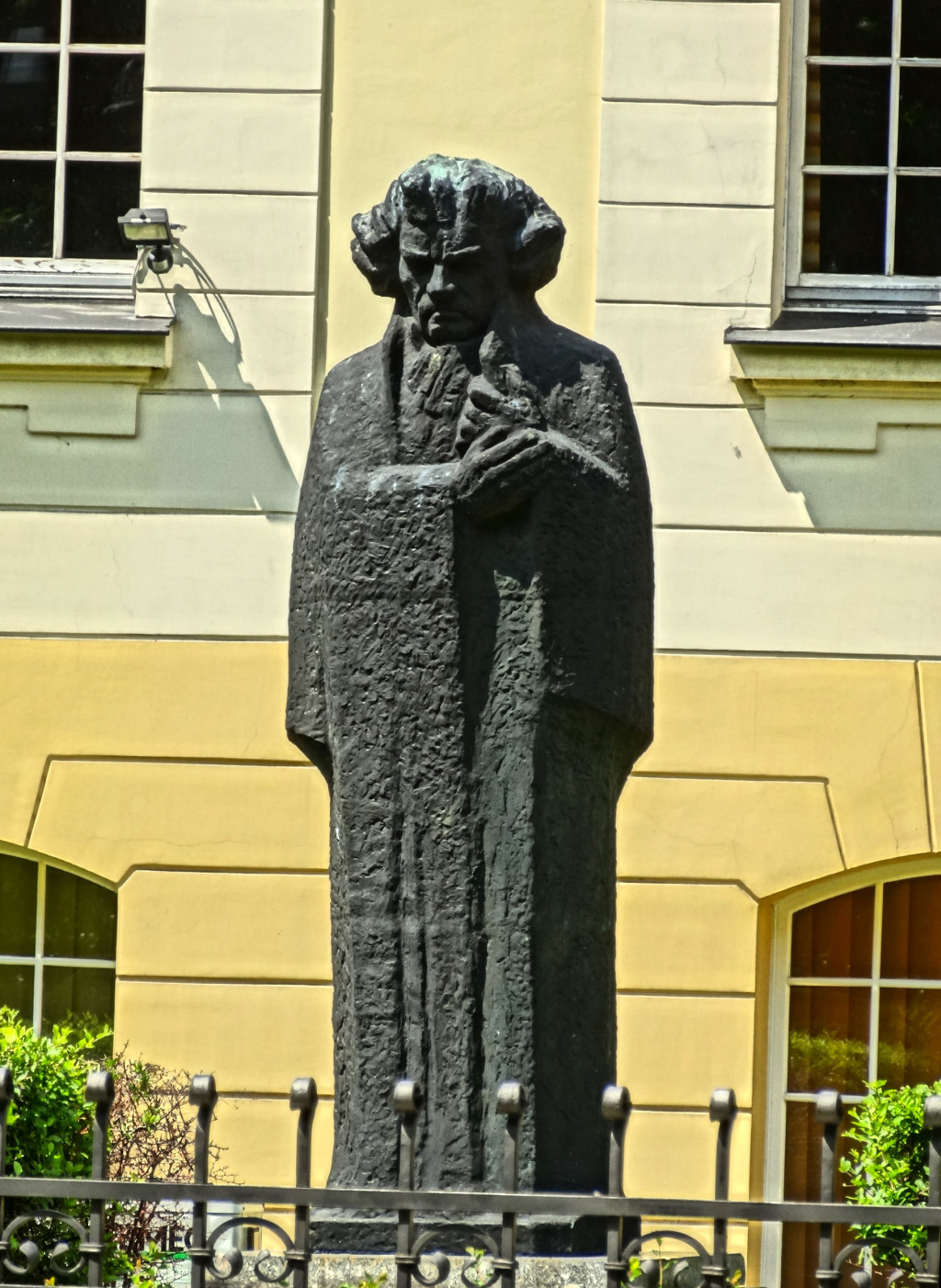
Beethoven, by Witold Marciniak

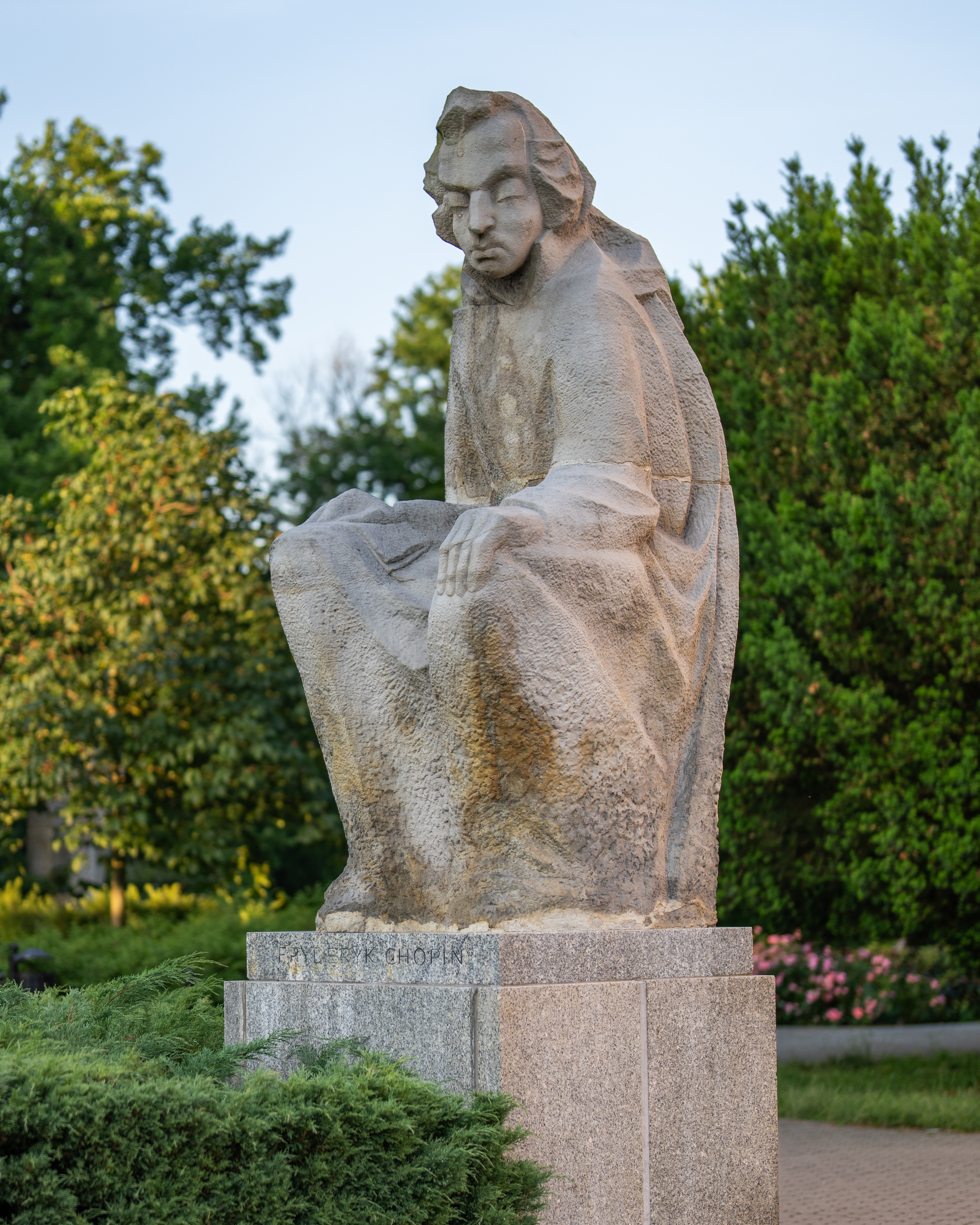
Chopin, by Józef Makowski

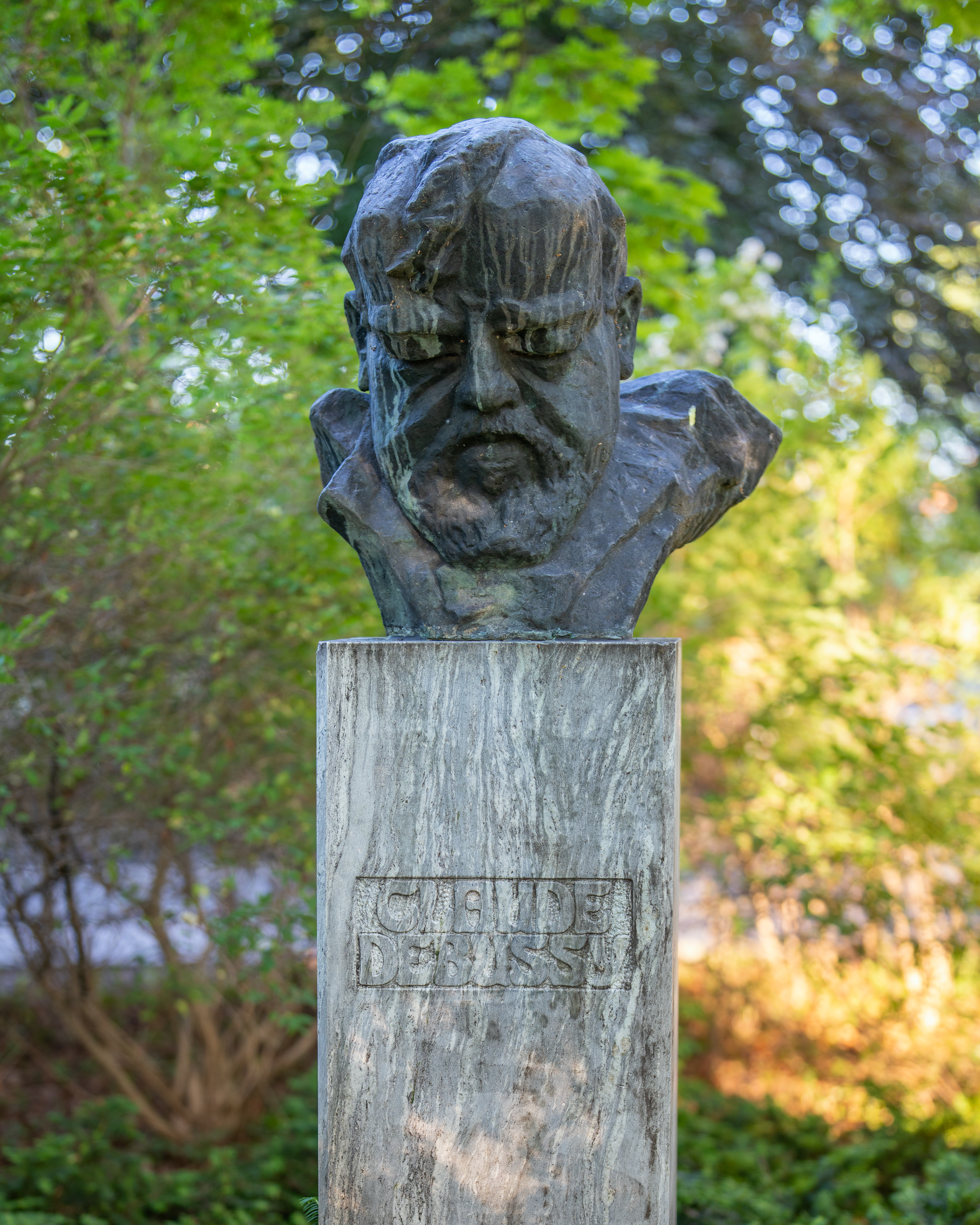
Debussy, by Andrzej Kasten

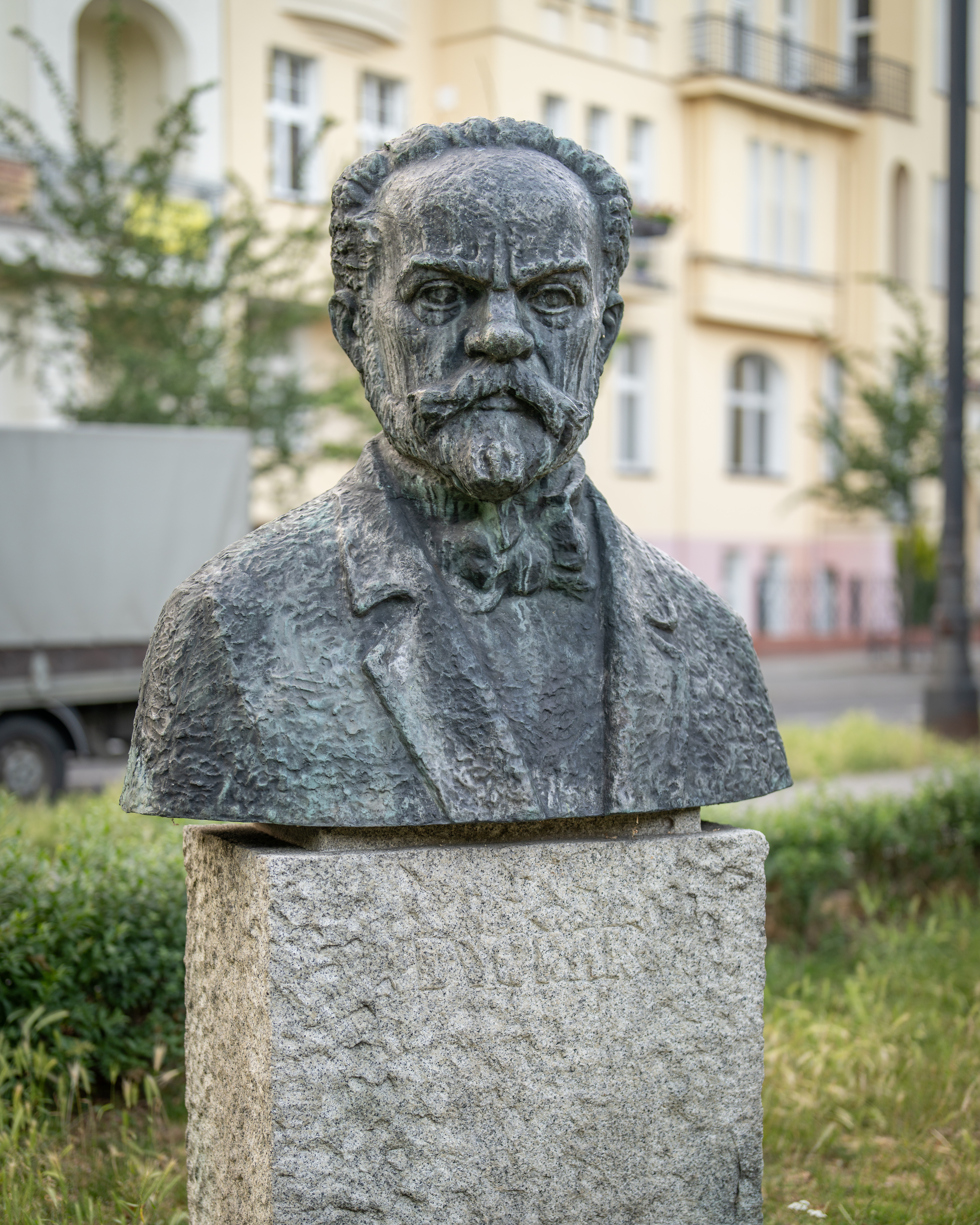
Dvořák, by Witold Marciniak

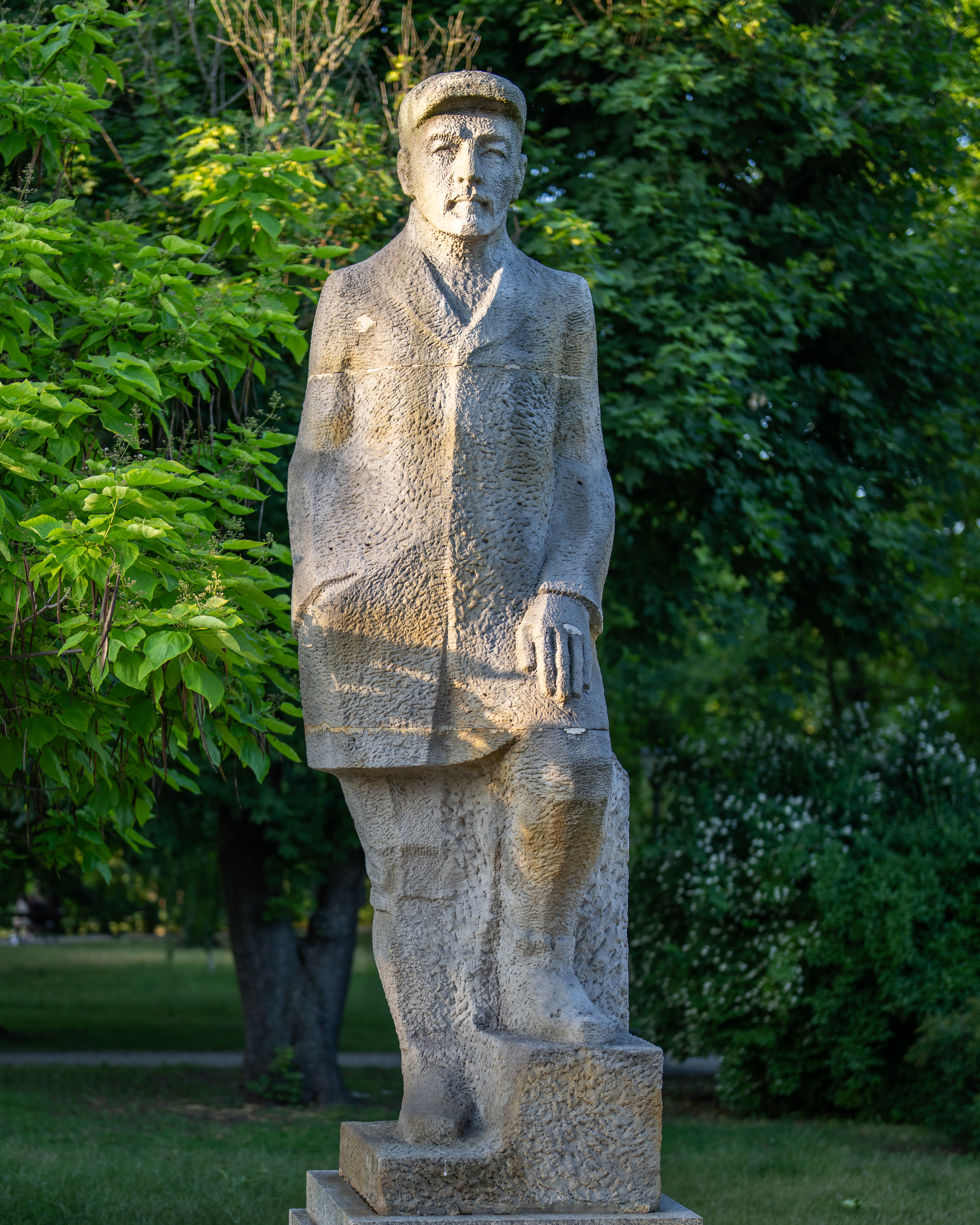
Karłowicz, by Henryk Rasmus

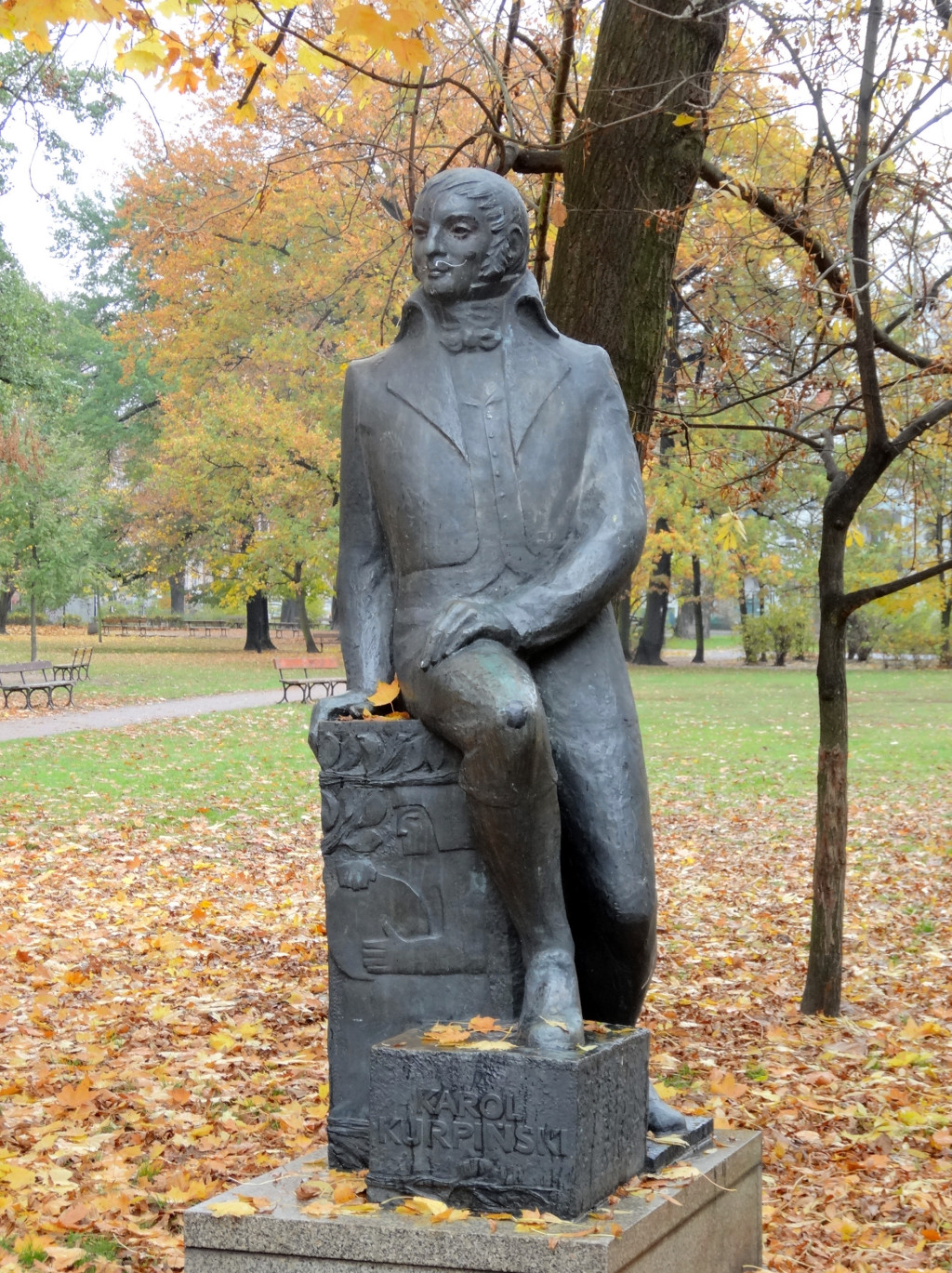
Kurpiński, by Ewelina & Henryk Szczech-Siwicka

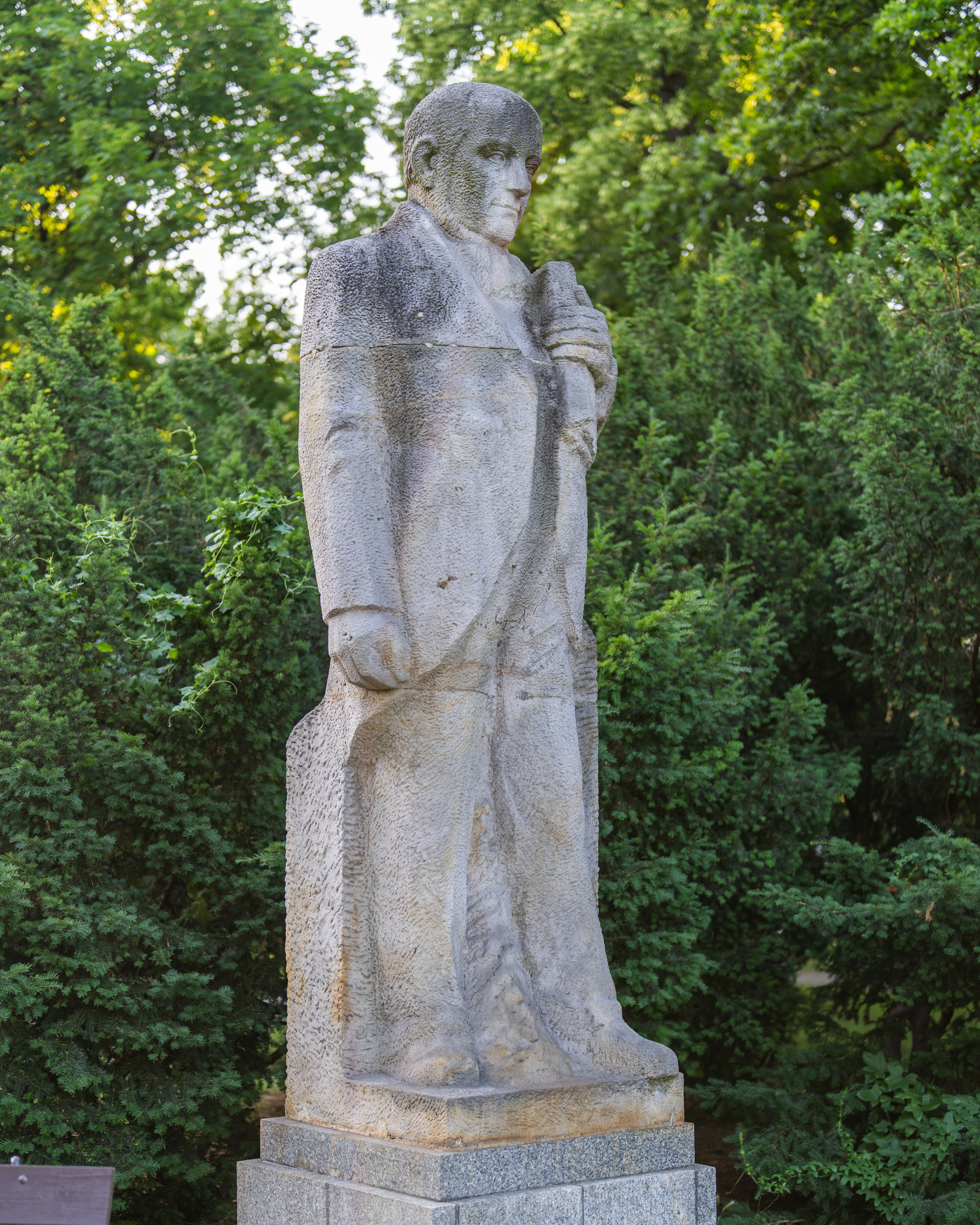
Moniuszko, by Witold Marciniak

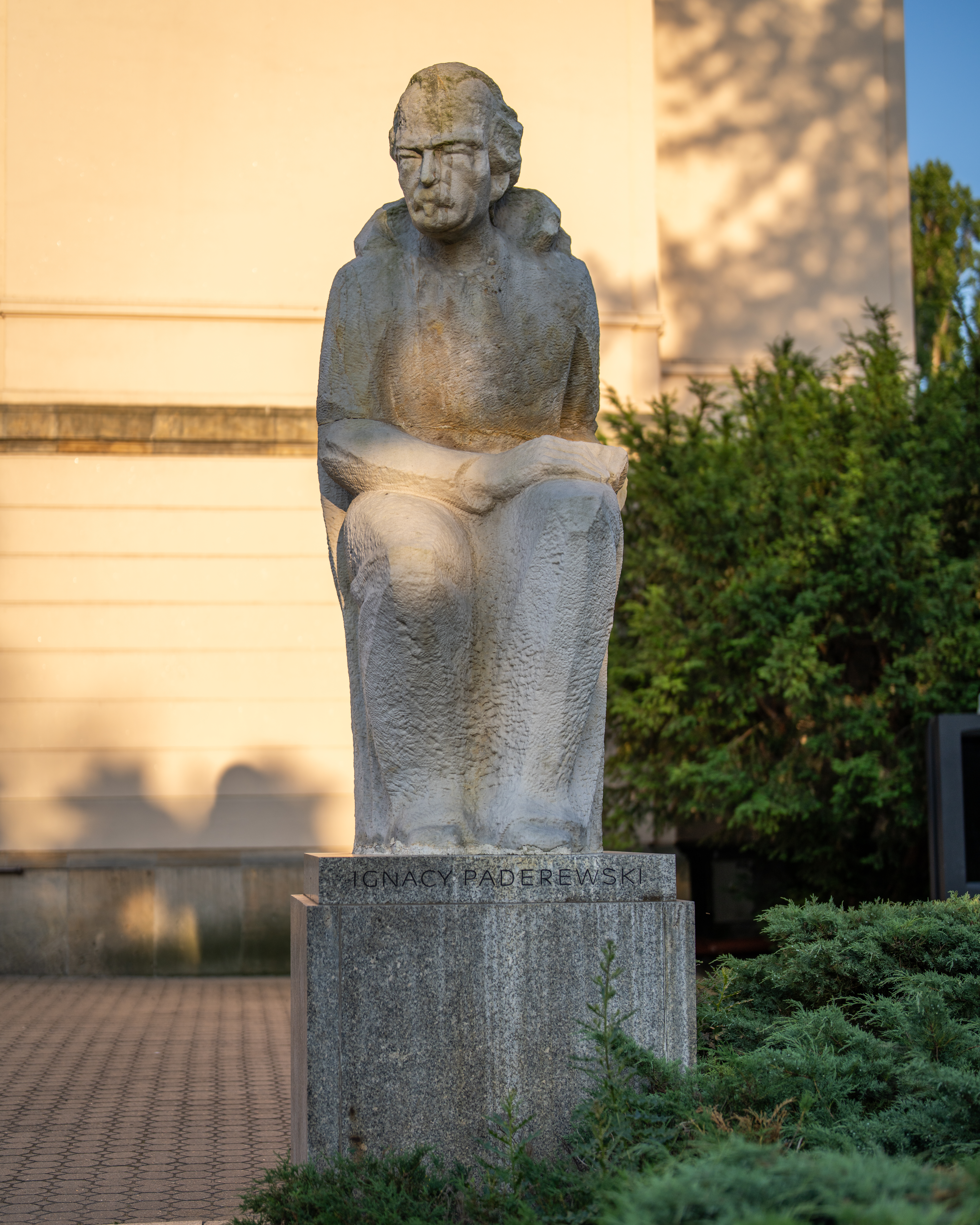
Paderewski, by Józef Makowski

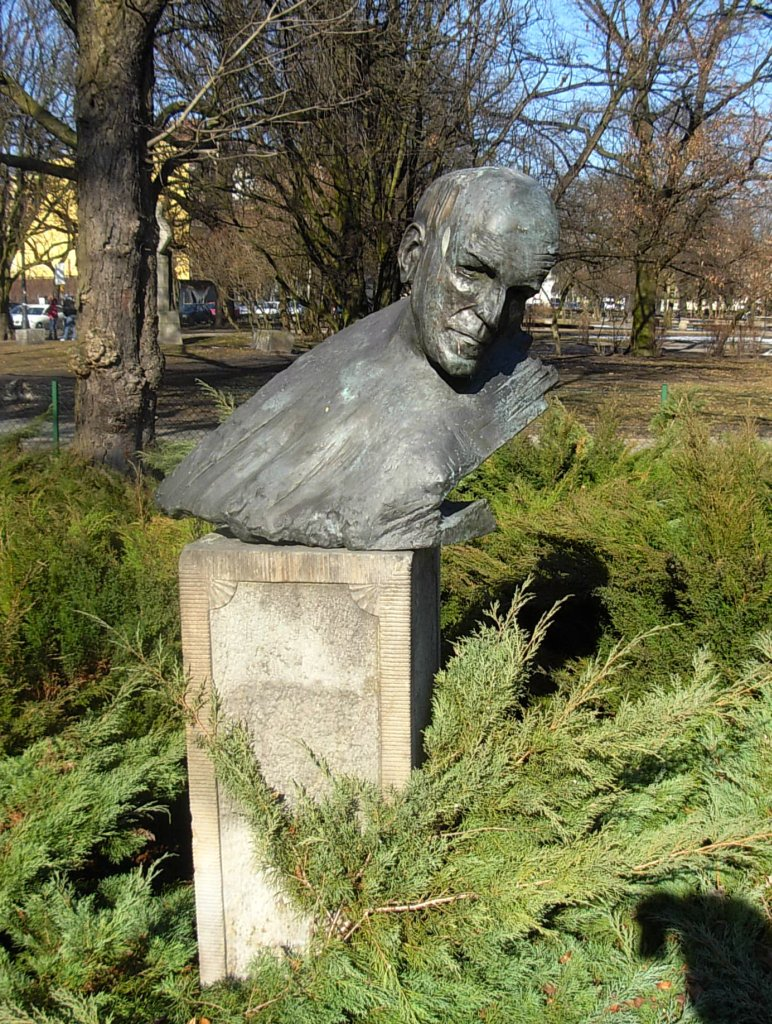
Sviatoslav Richter

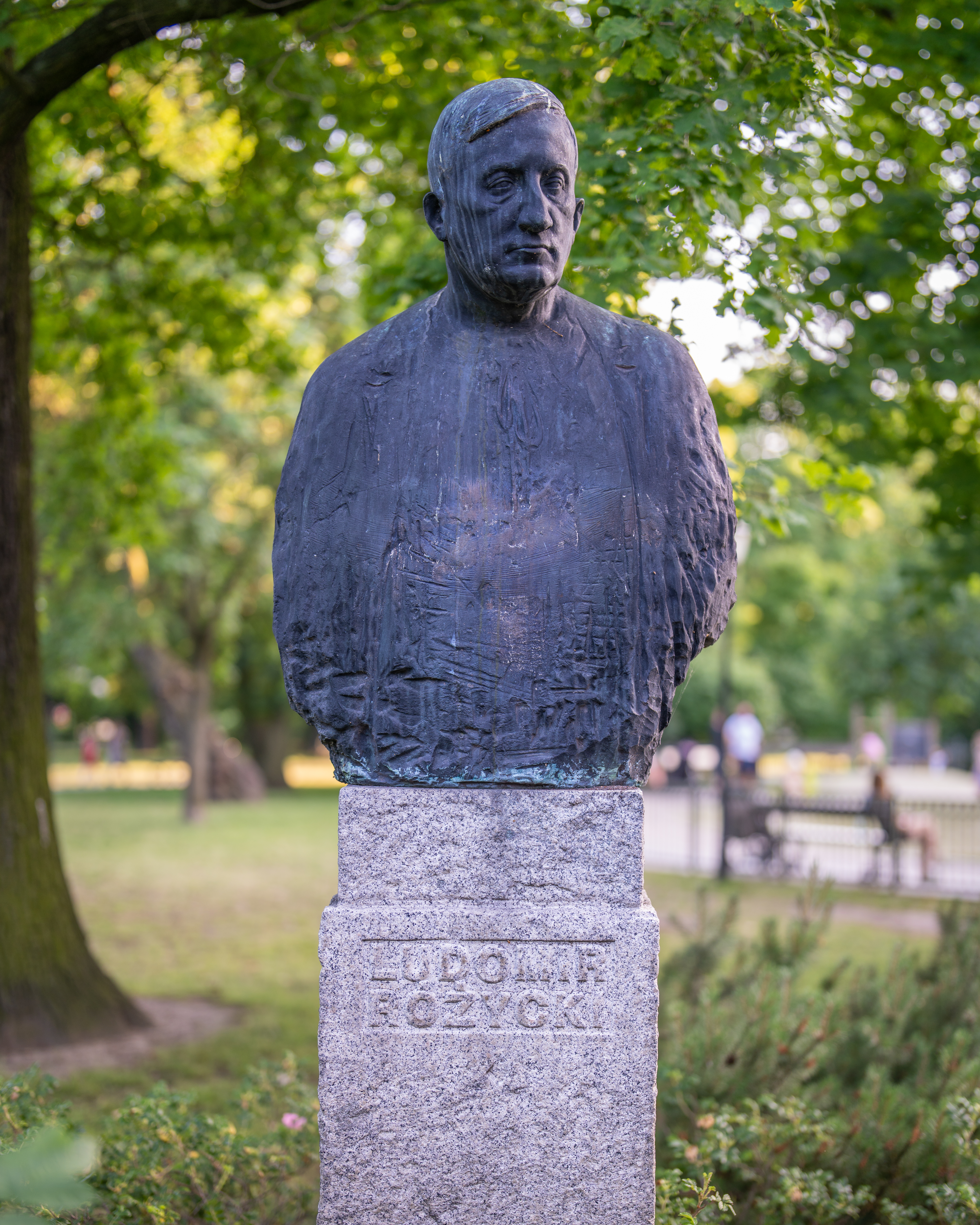
Różycki, by Mieczysław Welter

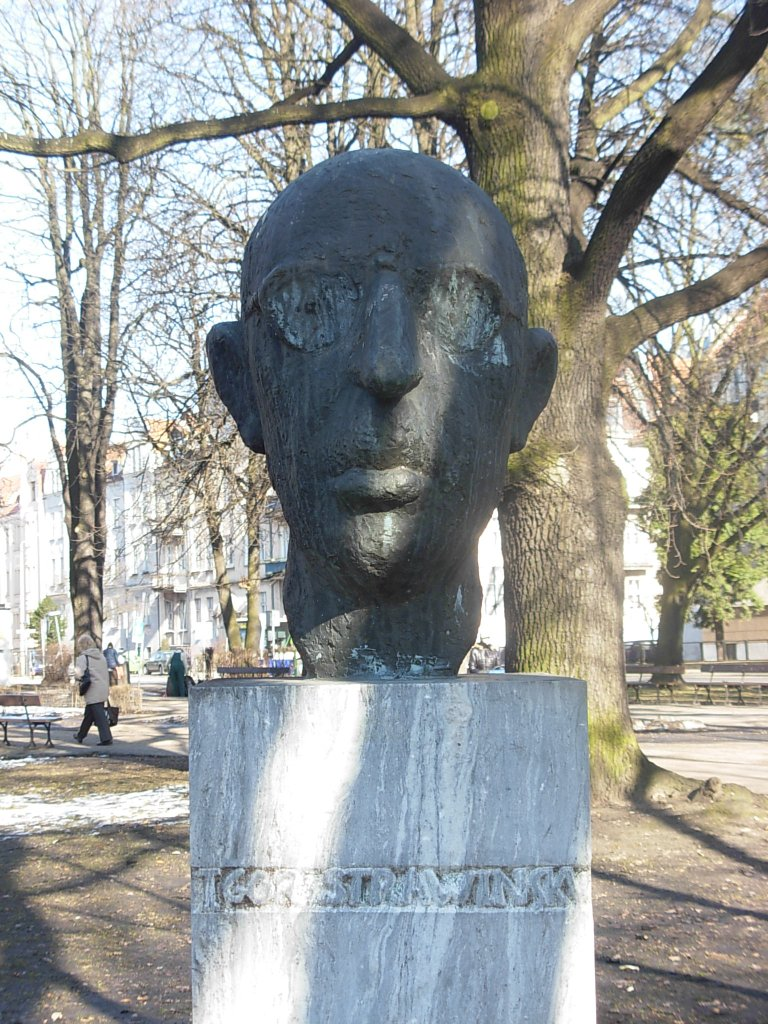
Stravinsky, by Barbara Zbrożyna

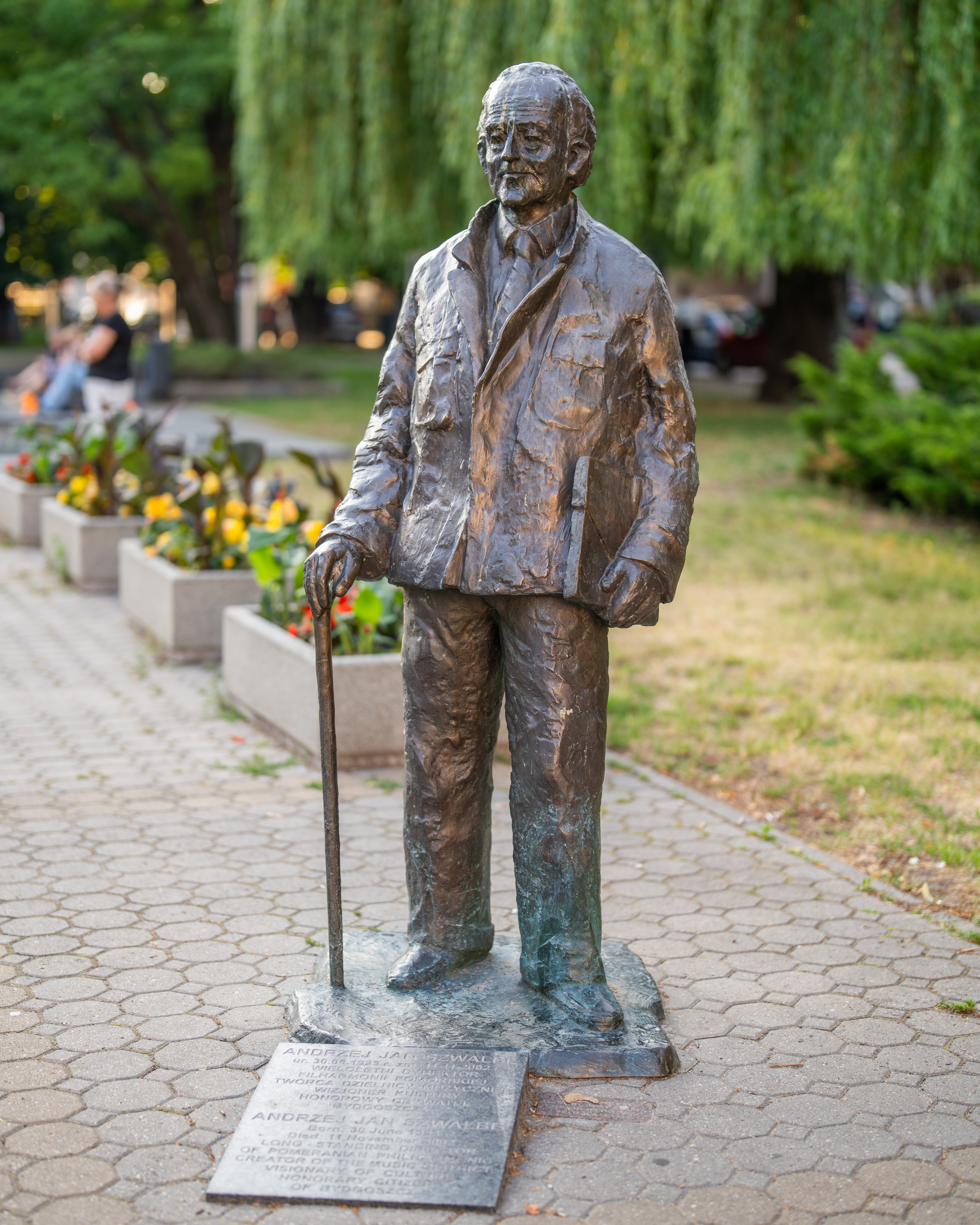
Andrzej Szwalbe, by Michał Kubiak

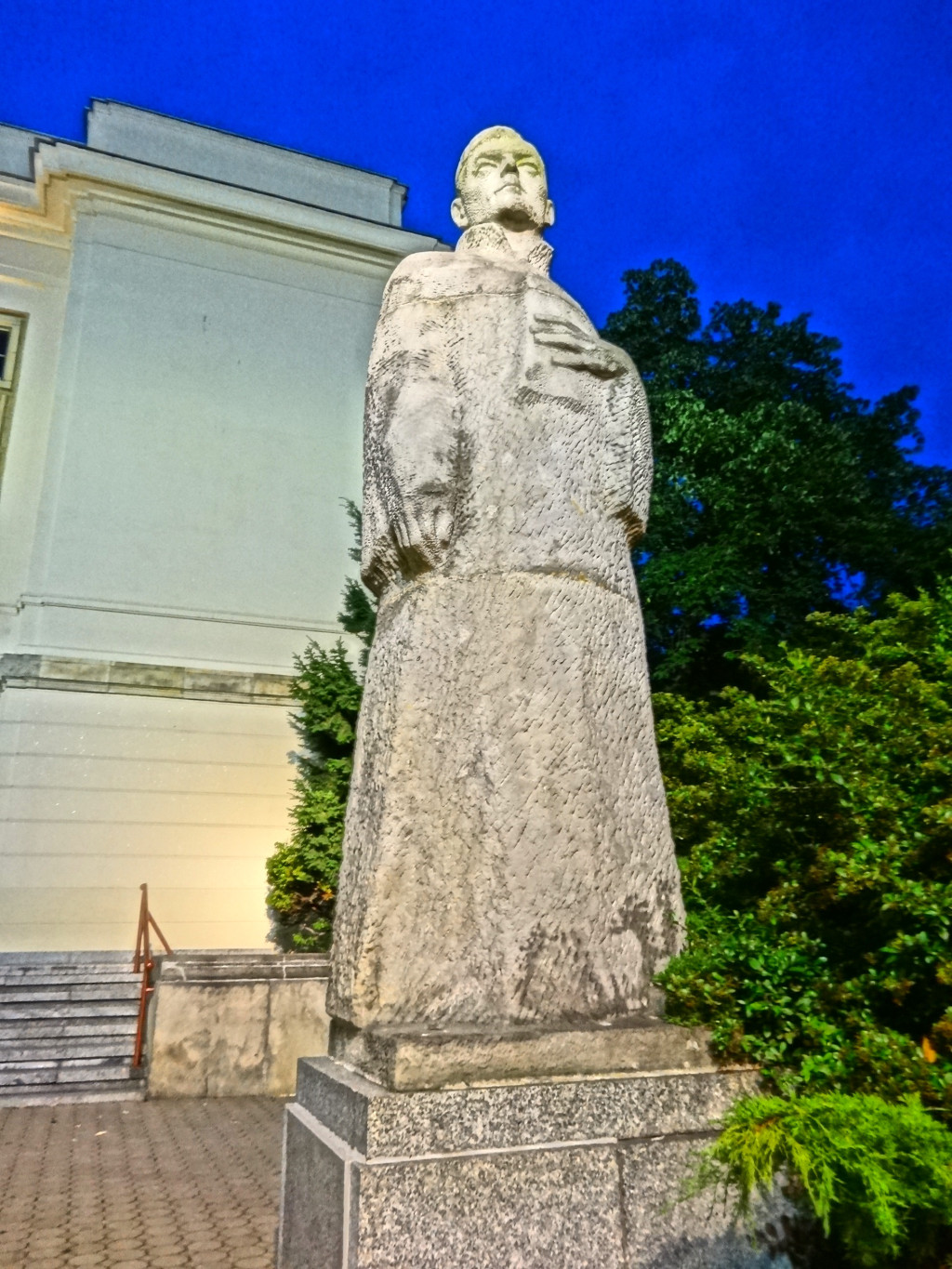
Szymanowski, by Ewelina & Henryk Szczech-Siwicka

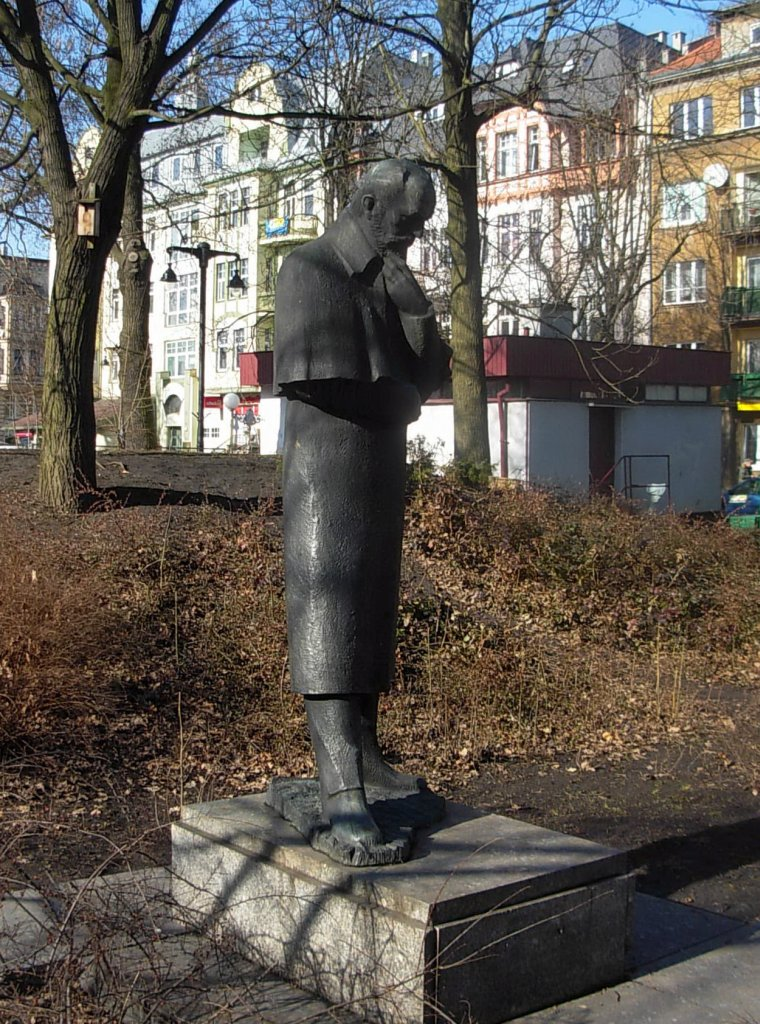
Tchaikovsky, by Ewelina & Henryk Szczech-Siwicka

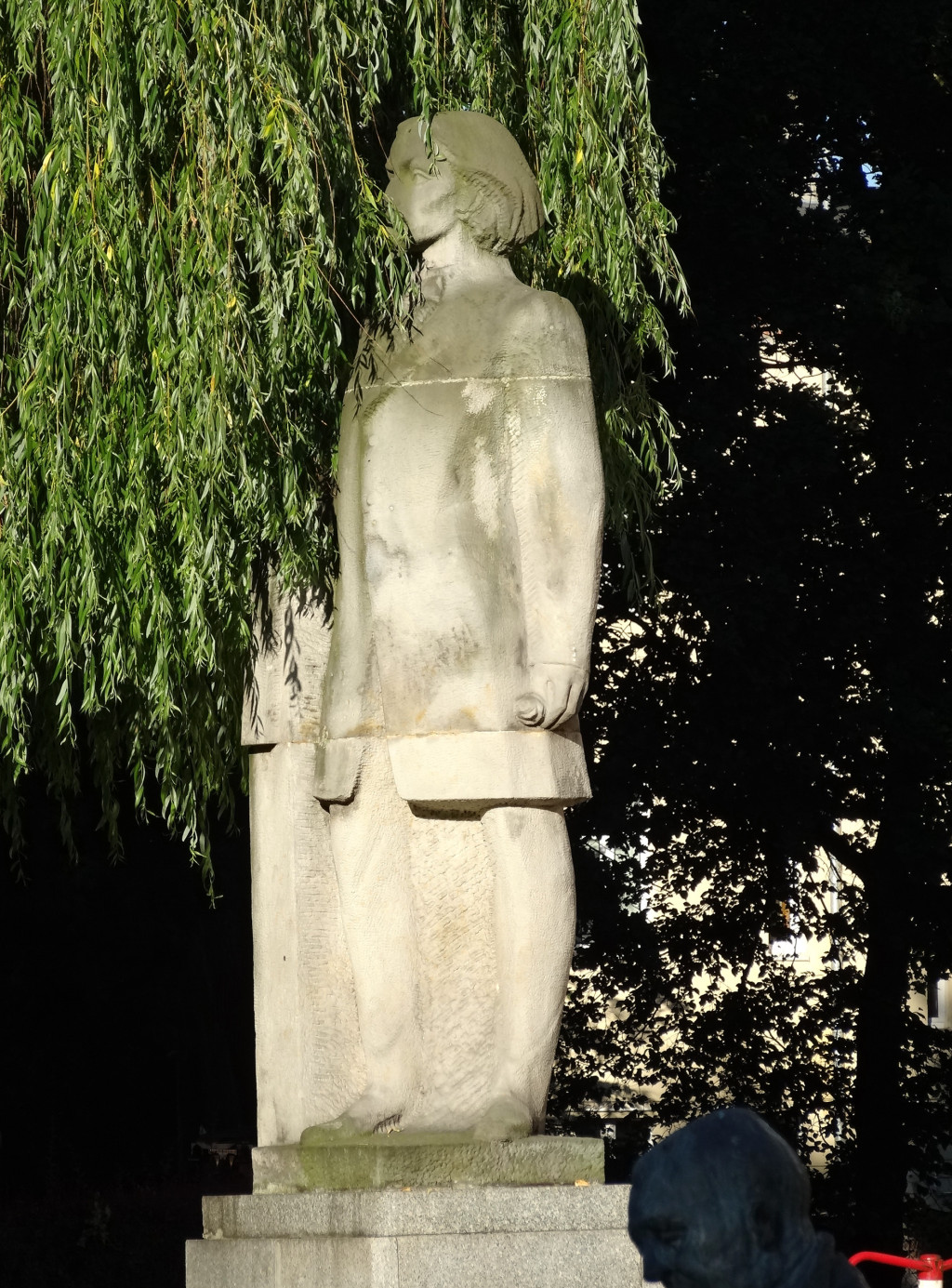
Wieniawski, by Ewelina & Henryk Szczech-Siwicka
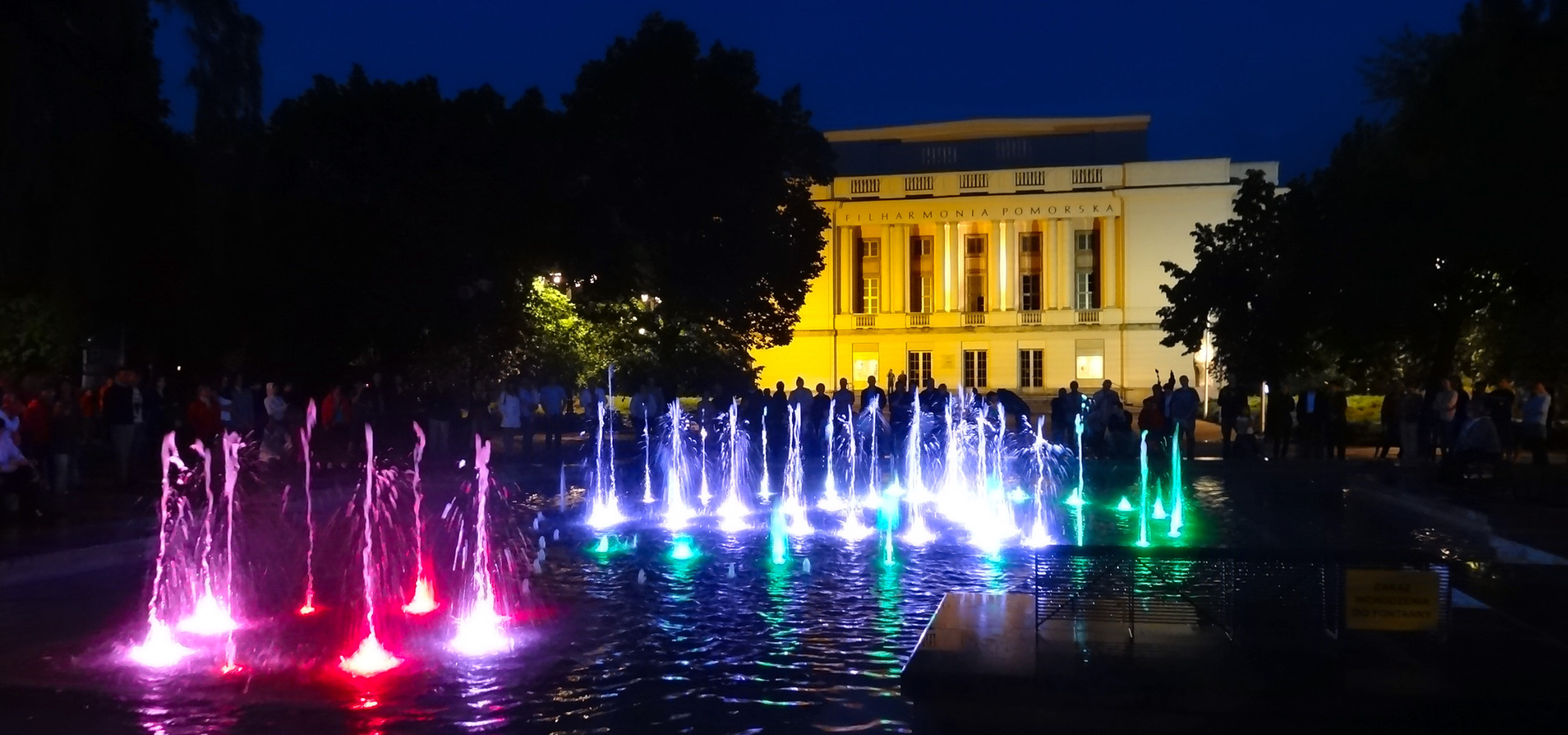
Night performance at the musical fountain

== See also ==
- Opera Nova Bydgoszcz
- Main building of Bydgoszcz Music Academy
