= Barbara Zbrożyna =

Polish sculptor

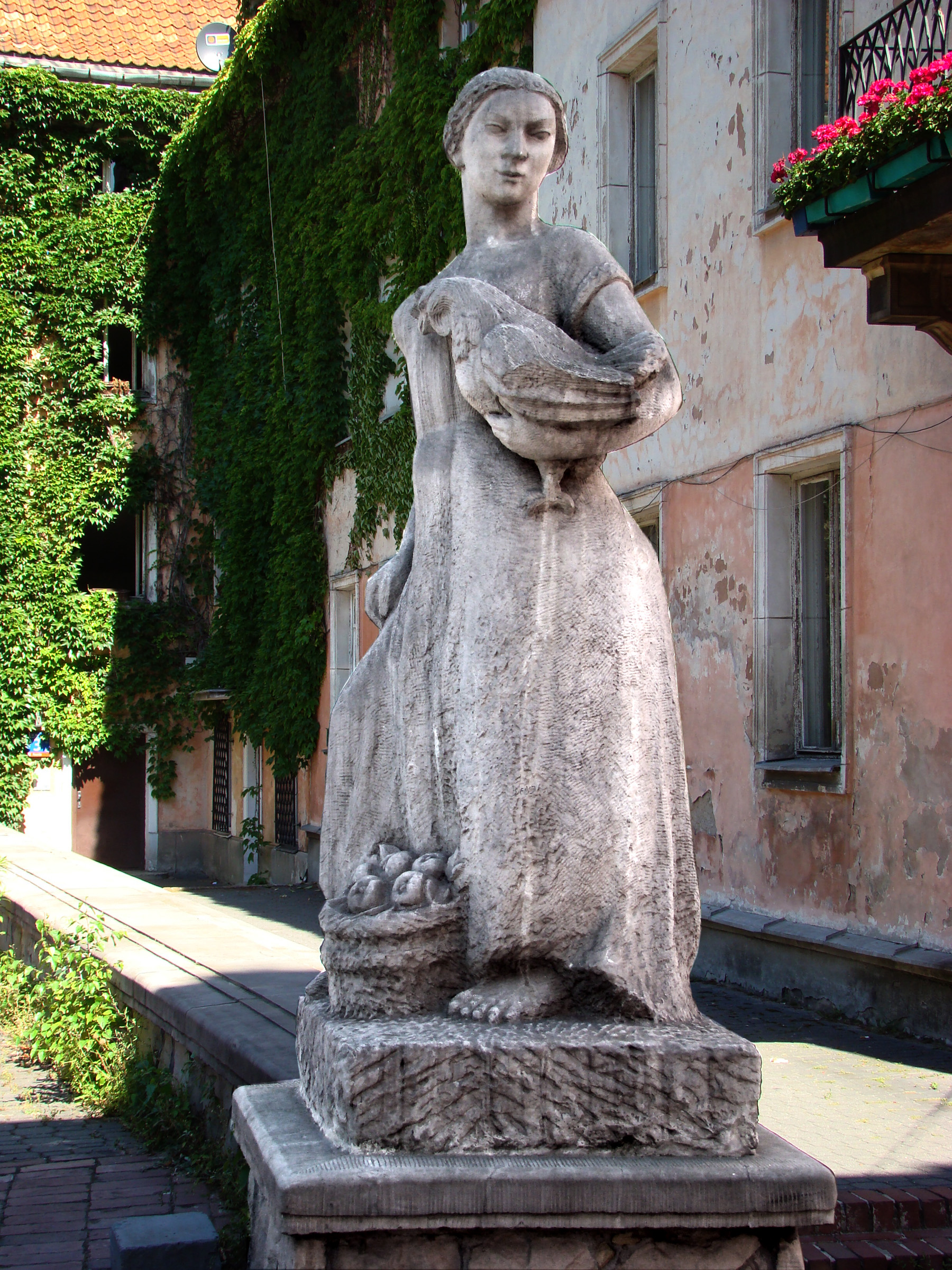
- Warsaw tradeswoman (1949). Barbara Zbrożyna
- Born: 1923; Lublin, Lublin Voivodeship, Second Polish Republic
- Died: 1995 (aged 71–72); Warsaw, Warsaw Voivodeship, Third Polish Republic
- Known for: sculpture
- Awards: Prize of Brat Albert Chmielowski (1986), Prize of Polcul Foundation (1991)

Barbara Zbrożyna (1923–1995) was a Polish sculptor, creator of figural sculptures, monuments, portraits, religious and sepulchral sculptures. Her style evolved from realism through the synthetic simplifications, expressive and metaphoric deformation, to abstraction. She was also a painter, drawer and poet. Awarded for achievements in arts by Solidarność (1984, 1989), awarded the Prize of Brat Albert Chmielowski (1986) and Prize of Polcul Foundation (1991).

== Biography ==
Barbara Zbrożyna was born on September 1, 1923, in Lublin. She studied at the Jan Matejko Academy of Fine Arts in Kraków at Xawery Dunikowski (1945–1947) and at the Academy of Fine Arts in Warsaw at Franciszek Strynkiewicz (1947–1952). In the years of 1951–1954, she participated in reconstruction of monumental sculptures in Warsaw. In 1976, she signed the Letter of 59, an open letter signed by 66 Polish intellectuals who protested against the changes of the Constitution of the People's Republic of Poland.

She died on December 15, 1995, in Warsaw.

== Works ==
She was a creator of sepulchral sculptures of Xawery Dunikowski (1966), Stanisław Herbst (1974), Artur Sandauer and Erna Rosenstein (1989), figural sculptures, monuments, portraits, and religious sculptures. Her most popular sculpture was the sandstone statue of a Warsaw tradeswoman on the Mariensztat marketplace in Warsaw (1949).
