= Jerzy Skarżyński =

Jerzy Skarżyński may refer to:

- Jerzy Skarżyński (athlete)
- Jerzy Skarżyński (artist)
