= Erna Rosenstein =

Polish artist (1913–2004)

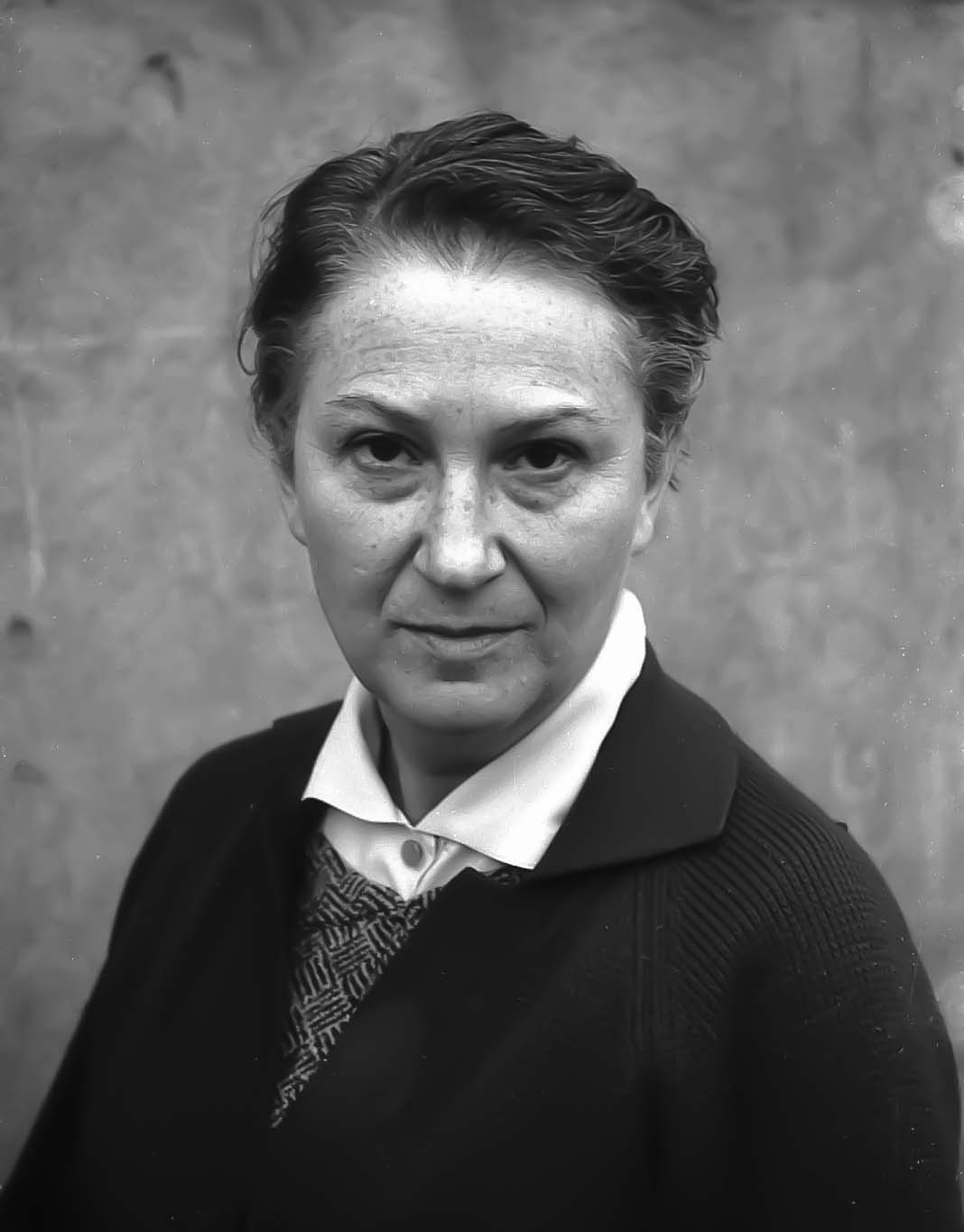
- Born: May 17, 1913; Lviv, Austria-Hungary
- Died: November 10, 2004 (aged 91); Warsaw, Poland
- Known for: painter, poet

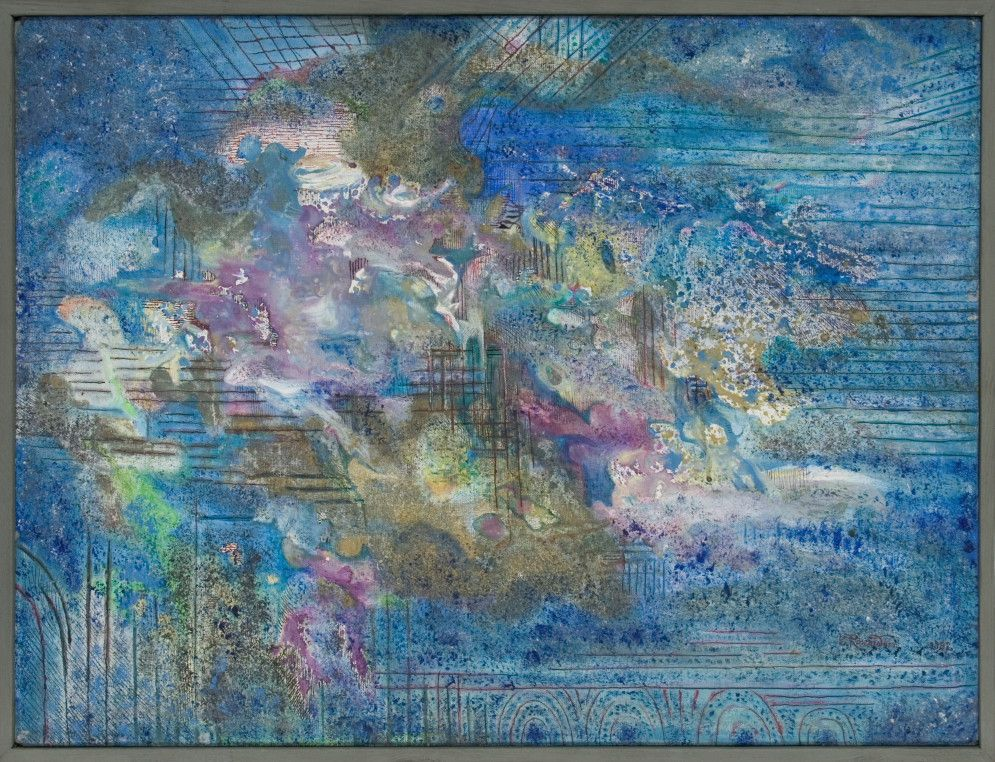
Erna Rosenstein, Eternity Gives Birth to the Moment

Erna Rosenstein (May 17, 1913 – November 10, 2004) was a Polish-Jewish painter and Holocaust survivor. She was part of the surrealist movement both as a visual artist and a writer.

She was associated with the pre-war Kraków Group and helped launch the Second Kraków Group after World War II.

== Early life and education ==
Rosenstein was born to Anna and Maksymillian Rosenstein on May 17, 1913 in Lviv, Austria-Hungary (now Ukraine). Her father was a lawyer and then a judge.

Rosenstein attended school in Kraków where she joined the communist organization, International Red Aid (MOPR).

She studied at the Women’s Academy in Vienna (1932-1934) and the Academy of Fine Arts in Kraków.

== The Holocaust ==
The Rosenstein family was forced into the Lviv Ghetto after the Nazi invasion of Poland. The family escaped the ghetto, but were caught. Rosenstein's parents were murdered in front of her in 1942. Rosenstein was badly injured in the attack. She survived World War II, hiding under various aliases.

== Post-war career ==
After the war, Rosenstein travel to Switzerland, Britain, and France. She met her husband, Polish-Jewish literary critic Artur Sandauer, when in Paris.

She co-founded the Second Kraków Group. In 1955 she was included in the exhibit Nine Artists along with fellow artist Tadeusz Brzozowski, Maria Jarema, Tadeusz Kantor, Jadwiga Maziarska, Kazimierz Mikulski, Jerzy Nowosielski, Jerzy Skarżyński, and Jonasz Stern. In 1967, a retrospective of her work was held at the Zachęta National Gallery of Art.

During the Polish government antisemitic campaign of in 1968, many Jews were forced from their schools, jobs, and ultimately, the country. This included many artists and friends of Rosenstein's. Her work at this time is noted to reflect this period of heightened antisemitism. In 1996 she received Jan Cybis Award.

Her work is in the collection of the Art Institute of Chicago In 2021 the Hauser & Wirth Gallery in New York held her first solo exhibition outside of Poland, entitled Once Upon a Time. In 2023 her work was included in the exhibition Action, Gesture, Paint: Women Artists and Global Abstraction 1940-1970 at the Whitechapel Gallery in London.

The Belvedere Museum in Vienna dedicated an exhibition to Rosenstein's work from July 3, 2026 to January 10, 2026 curated by Stephanie Auer.

== Death ==
Rosenstein died on November 10, 2004 in Warsaw, Poland.

== Family ==
Erna and her husband Artur Sandauer had one child, a son named Adam.

Rosenstein's brother, the Austrian professor Paul N. Rosenstein-Rodan went on to become a Boston University professor and economist. He coined the term "underdeveloped countries".
