= Harmonichord =

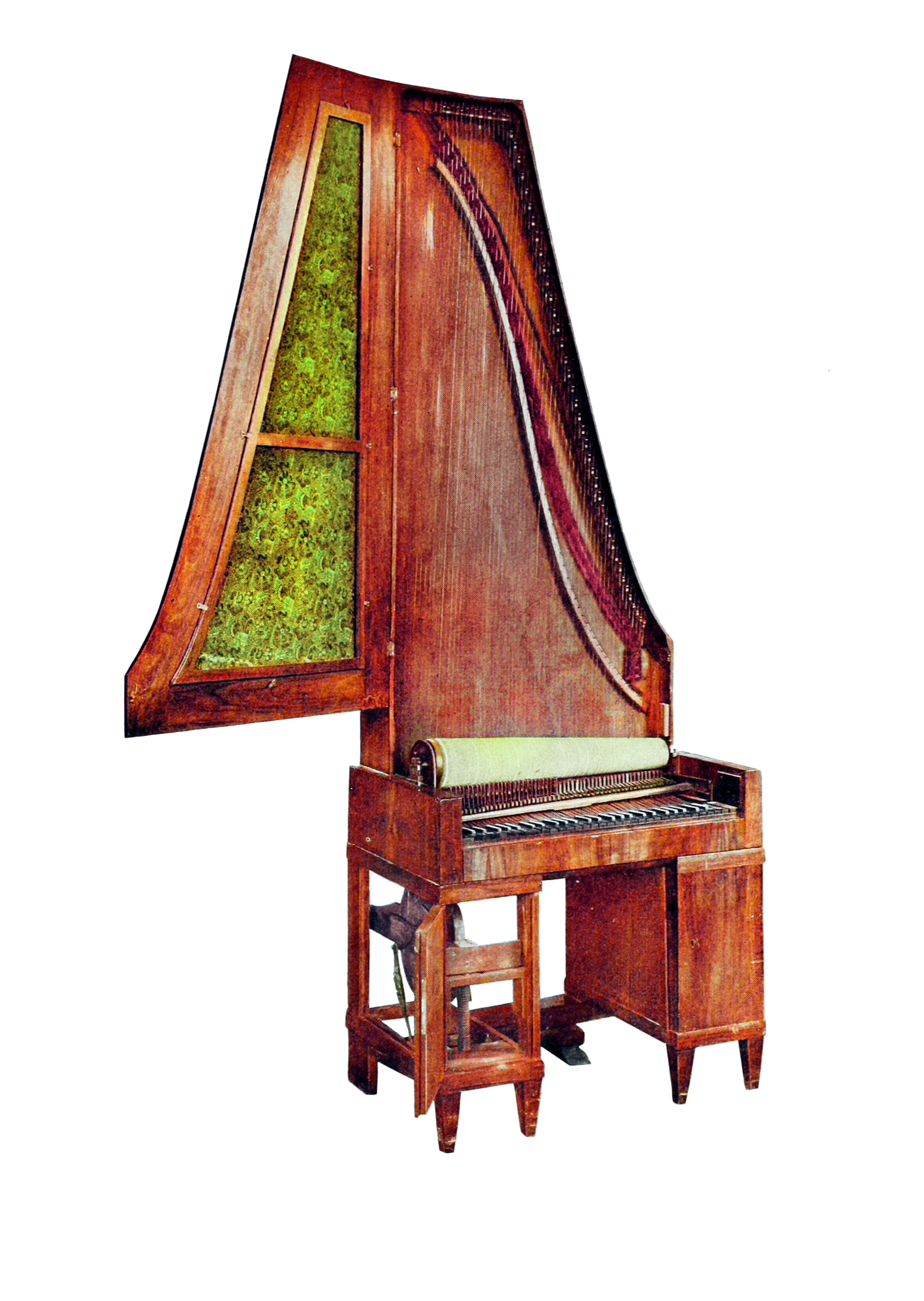
Harmonichord built in 1835, false colors.

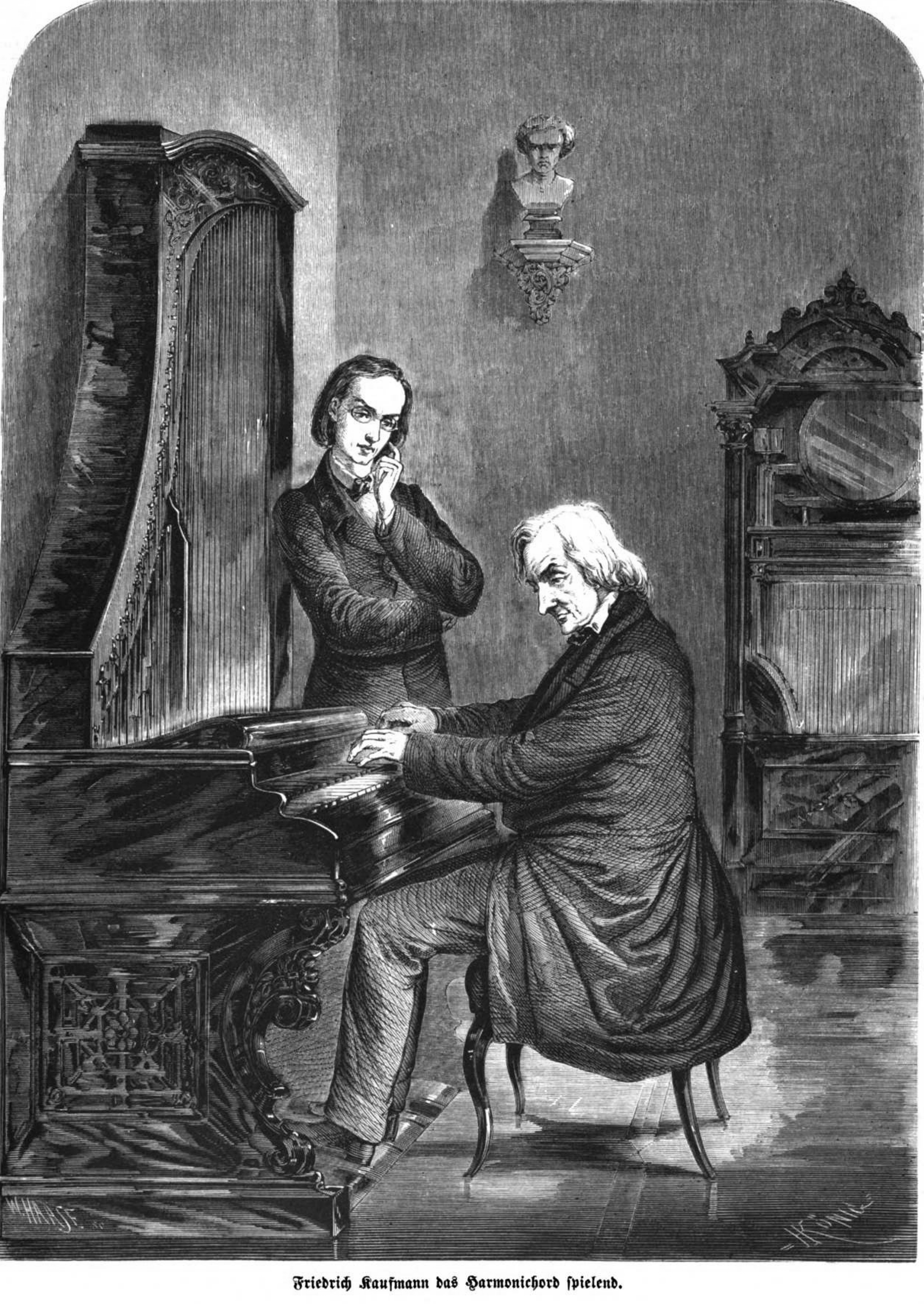
An illustration from 1860 showing Friedrich Kaufmann playing the harmonichord.

A harmonichord is a kind of upright piano in which the strings are set in vibration not by the blow of the hammer but by indirectly transmitted friction.

== Description ==
The harmonichord, one of the many attempts to fuse the piano and violin, was invented by Johann Gottfried Kaufmann and Johann Friedrich Kaufmann (father and son) in Saxony at the beginning of the 19th century, when the craze for new and ingenious musical instruments was at its height.

The case was of the variety known as giraffe. The space under the keyboard was enclosed, a knee-hold being left in which were two pedals used to set in rotation a large wooden cylinder fixed just behind the keyboard over the levers, and covered with a roll-top similar to those of modern office desks. The cylinder (in some specimens covered with chamois leather) tapered towards the treble-end. When a key was depressed, a little tongue of wood, one end of which stopped the string, was pressed against the revolving cylinder, and the vibrations produced by friction were transmitted to the string and reinforced as in the piano and violin by the soundboard. The adjustment of the parts and the velocity of the cylinder required delicacy and great nicety, for if the little wooden tongues rested too lightly upon the cylinder or the strings, harmonics were produced, and the note jumped to the octave or twelfth. Sometimes when chords were played the touch became so heavy that two performers were required, as in the early medieval organistrum, the prototype of the harmonichord. Carl Maria von Weber must have had some opinion of the possibilities of the harmonichord, which in tone resembled the glass harmonica, since he composed a concerto with orchestral accompaniment for the instrument.
