= Artur Sandauer =

Polish author and translator

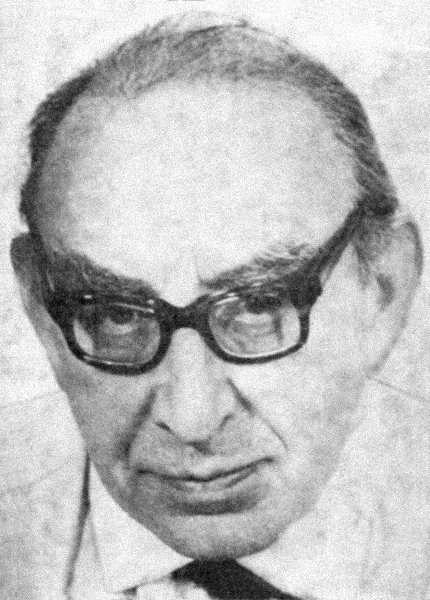
- Born: December 14, 1913; Sambor, Congress Poland
- Died: 15 July 1989 (aged 75); Warsaw, Polish People's Republic
- Resting place: Powązki Military Cemetery
- Citizenship: Poland
- Education: University of Lwow
- Occupations: Writer, essayist, literary critic
- Spouse: Erna Rosenstein
- Awards: Order of Polonia Restituta, Meritorious Activist of Culture, Order of the Banner of Labour

Artur Sandauer (14 December 1913 – 15 July 1989) was a Polish and Jewish literary critic, essayist, and professor at the University of Warsaw.

== Biography ==
He was born in Sambor. After completing his studies in classical philology at the Jan Kazimierz University in Lviv, he taught in Sambor in 1939–1941. There he was imprisoned in a ghetto, from which he escaped in 1943 with his mother and sister, and then went into hiding. In 1944–1945 he was a soldier of the Polish People's Army, a war correspondent for the Pancerni newspaper, demobilized with the rank of second lieutenant. In 1946–1948 he lived in Paris. In 1948–1949 he worked in the editorial office of the weekly Odrodzenie in Warsaw.

In the period 1947–1949 Artur Sandauer actively opposed socialist realism, as a result of which he received a ban on publishing, which was in force until the end of the Stalinist period. His series of publications from 1957 and then the book entitled Bez tarify leniowej were a turn of phrase that began the departure from the officially binding doctrine of socialist realism. Incidentally, the professional, railway term "bez tarify leniowej" was accepted in everyday language. Since censorship prevented the printing of the first articles of this series, they were initially published in Kultura Paryska. Sandauer was the first Polish writer living in the country who dared to publish in Kultura Paryska.

In 1964, he was one of the signatories of the so-called Letter of 34, a protest letter of 34 intellectuals addressed to the Prime Minister against the tightening of censorship. Retired since 1979.

On August 23, 1980, he joined the appeal of 64 scholars, writers and publicists to the communist authorities to start a dialogue with striking workers. Although he never belonged to the PZPR, after the introduction of martial law he accepted membership in the National Council of Culture, a state-led organization that supported General Wojciech Jaruzelski, and also became a member of the Polish Writers' Union reactivated by the authorities (since 1983).

He coined the term "allosemitism" in a book published in 1982. Sandauer was married to Polish-Jewish painter Erna Rosenstein. From 1949 he was married to the painter Erna Rosenstein (1913–2004), with whom he had a son, Adam (1950–2023), a physicist, political and social activist.
