= Jerzy Skarżyński (artist) =

Polish painter (1924–2004)

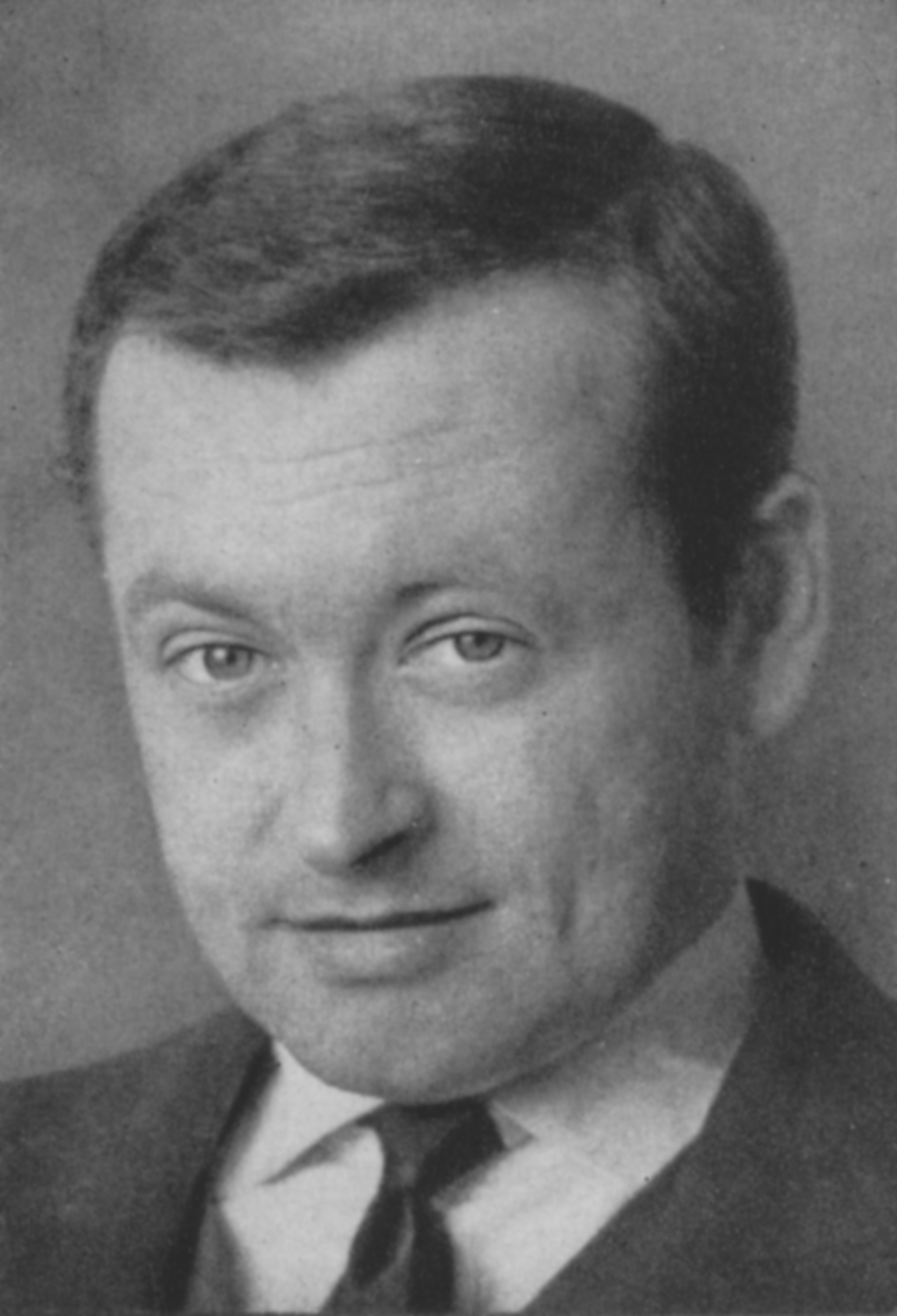
Jerzy Skarżyński (before 1965)

Jerzy Skarżyński (December 16, 1924, Kraków – January 7, 2004, Kraków) was a Polish painter, theater and film stage designer, book illustrator and educator.

== Awards and decorations ==
- 2000: Commander's Cross of the Order of Polonia Restituta
- During the Polish People's Republic times:
  - Distinguished Activist of Culture
  - Gold Cross of Merit
  - Knight's Cross of the Order of Polonia Restituta
