= Main building of Bydgoszcz Music Academy =

- Polish: Gmach główny Akademii Muzycznej w Bydgoszczy
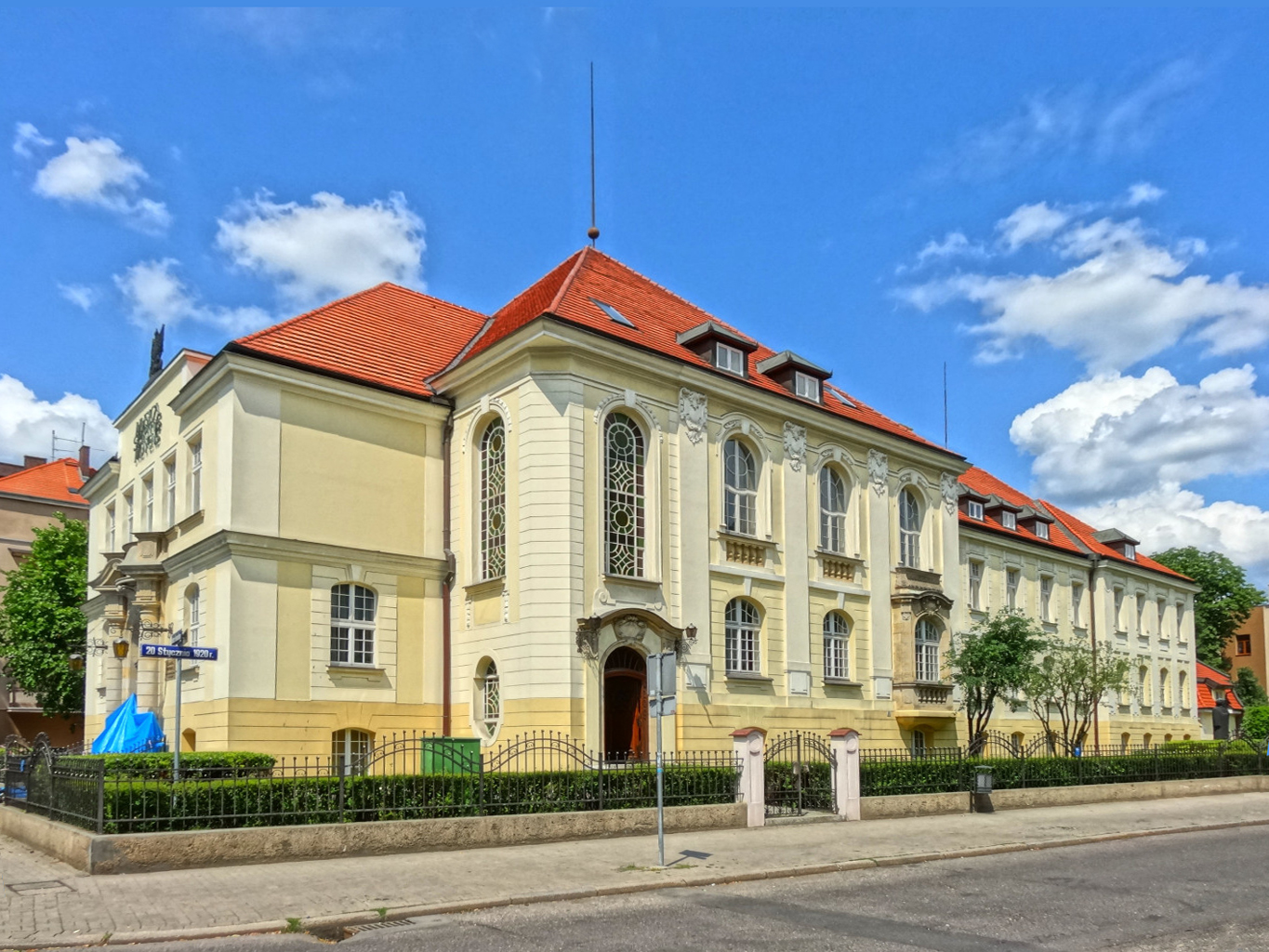
- View from Słowackiego street
- Interactive map of the Main building of Bydgoszcz Music Academy area

General information
- Type: Music school
- Architectural style: Neo-Baroque
- Classification: Nr.601404, Reg.A/782/1-3 (May 8, 1992)
- Location: 7 Słowackiego street, Bydgoszcz, Poland
- Coordinates: 53°7′47″N 18°00′35″E
- Groundbreaking: 1904
- Completed: 1906
- Client: Bydgoszcz Music Academy - "Feliks Nowowiejski"

Technical details
- Floor count: 3

Design and construction
- Architect: E. von Saltzwedel

The main building of Bydgoszcz Music Academy is a historical edifice in downtown Bydgoszcz, dating back to the early 20th century. It is registered on the Kuyavian-Pomeranian Voivodeship Heritage List.

== Location ==
The building is in downtown Bydgoszcz, on the corner of Słowackiego street and January 20, 1920 street. In the vicinity stand the Pomeranian Philharmonic, the Music School and the Jan Kochanowski Park in Bydgoszcz .

== History ==
At the Prussian Partition, Bydgoszcz was the capital of the administrative region of the Grand Duchy of Posen as a borough city. After the Prussian administrative reform of 1872, the head of the district was a governor, a civil servant appointed by the King of Prussia. The present Music Academy building was designed as the seat of the district authority.

The first two governors had been using their private houses for official duty, dedicating three rooms to office work. But with the growing importance of the administration, the need of a proper building was blatant. The Prussian government hence decided the construction of one building housing all district offices. A competition selecting the project of the building rewarded engineer E. von Saltzwedel from Potsdam. After approval of the blueprint by the municipal construction expert Carl Meyer, on May 24, 1904, a construction permit was issued and work began. Its execution was contracted to M. Czarnikow & Co from Berlin, on an underdeveloped plot located at then 3 Bismarckstrasse (now 7 Słowackiego street).

In the same year (1904), a county committee ordered the construction of a coach house and stables on an abutting lot: it is today the library of the Music Academy.

During the interwar period, the edifice has housed the headquarters of the Polish district office (Polish: Starostwo Powiatowe w Bydgoszczy), then from 1945 to 1975, the District National Council (Polish: Rada Narodowa).

In 1975, thanks to Andrzej Szwalbe, the building was dedicated to educational purposes and underwent several upgrades, so as to accommodate the first Academy of Music, initially as a branch of the Academy of Music in Łódź.

The overhaul works, which lasted two years, were followed by the first director of Bydgoszcz Academy, Mgr Tadeusz Zfieliński. A second step in the renovation of the edifice occurred in 1979. Those works aimed at adapting the interiors for its future pedagogical purposes (e.g. setting up sound-proof walls and doors), while preserving the integrity of the historic elements: they have been carried out by engineer R. Helak and architects H. Sobczyk and J. Szczygielski.

Soon the lack of dormitory space became apparent. Some students had to be accommodated in the first year at the school for chemical technics (Polish: Zespół Szkół Chemicznych im. Ignacego Łukasiewicza w Bydgoszczy), in Łukasiewicza street. Others were housed at the hotel PUBR for workers in Toruńska street and several girls in Bursa Nr.1, at Bartosza Głowackiego Street.

After 1976, the Student Symphony Orchestra performed at several occasions:

- a concert commemorating the 150th anniversary of Ludwig van Beethoven's death
- the season opening, as an outside concert in "Jan Kochanowski" Park
- a concert of Polish music celebrating the 60th anniversary of Poland's independence

The school also invited famous soloists, among whom were Halina Czerny-Stefańska, Maria and Kazimierz Wiłkomirski, Piotr Paleczny, Tadeusz Żmudziński, Jerzy Godziszewski, and guests from the Soviet Union, such as the pianist Rudolf Kehrer.

A resolution of Ministers Council on November 27, 1979, appointed Bydgoszcz branch of the Academy of Music in Łódź as Bydgoszcz Music Academy (the 8th in Poland at the time).

On December 1, 1981, the school received the patron name of "Feliks Nowowiejski".

Currently the Bydgoszcz Academy of Music comprises four branches:

- Faculty of Composition, Theory of Music and Sound Engineering, with Theory of Music and Composition Department of Sound Engineering Department
- Faculty of Instrumental Music
- Faculty of Vocal Music and Drama
- Faculty of Conducting, Jazz Music and Music Education

The current director is Jerzy Kaszuba.

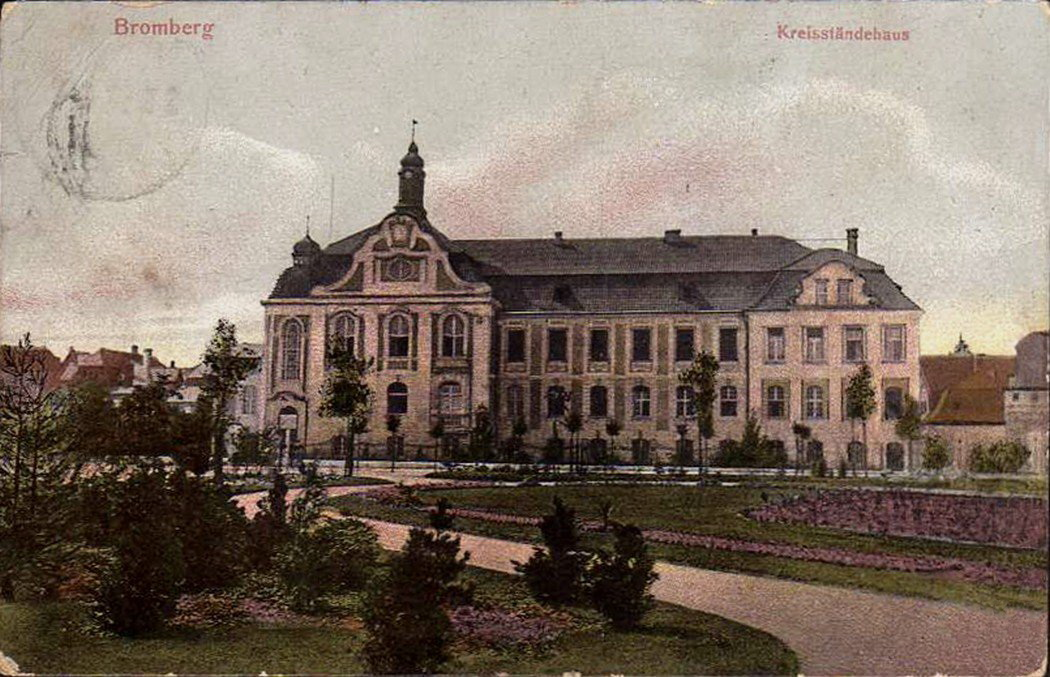
Building in 1906

== Architecture ==
The building presents an eclectic architecture, with a predominance of Neo-Baroque forms, which at the time was a characteristic public buildings. Such style has been also used in the construction of other public buildings, as well as palaces and houses.

The front elevation displays an avant-corps, with a richly decorated portal flanked by Doric order columns: it is topped by the motto of the academy, Musica Spiritus Movens, Latin for Music moves the soul. The avant-corps is crowned by the Polish Eagle. All façades are plastered so as to enhance the effect of decoration made of sandstone, such as the beautiful bay window incorporating many architectural details on the eastern side, or the numerous bossages, pilasters, pediments, arched windows or oeil-de-boeuf. The building is covered with a high mansard roof, with dormers bulging out.

The hotel originally served as for official purposes. On the ground were offices. West wing was housing the tax office of the county and in the eastern one were located a meeting hall of the District Committee, as well as District Mayor offices. His private apartment was standing in the northern part of the edifice, and in the attic were also four more rooms for ancillary service. The building possessed a low pressure water heating system, and electrical and gas installations.

Today, interiors preserved floorboards and parquet floors, oak staircase and railings, stone columns, as well as paintings and gildings, wood panellings, the rich stuccoed and vaulted ceiling.

The edifice was registered on the Kuyavian-Pomeranian Voivodeship Heritage List, Nr.601404 Reg.A/782/1-3, on May 8, 1992.

== Gallery ==
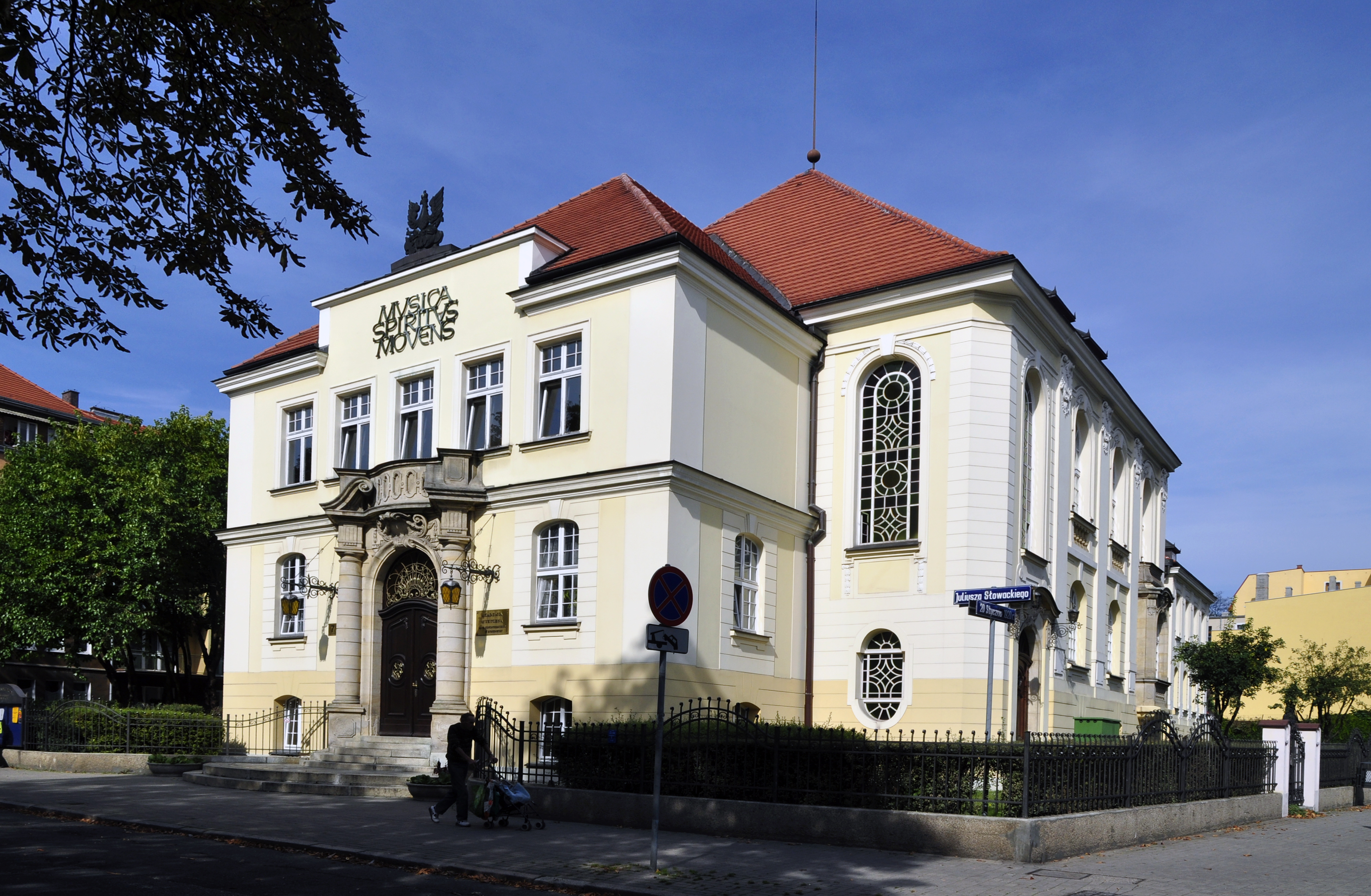
Main entry with its avant-corps

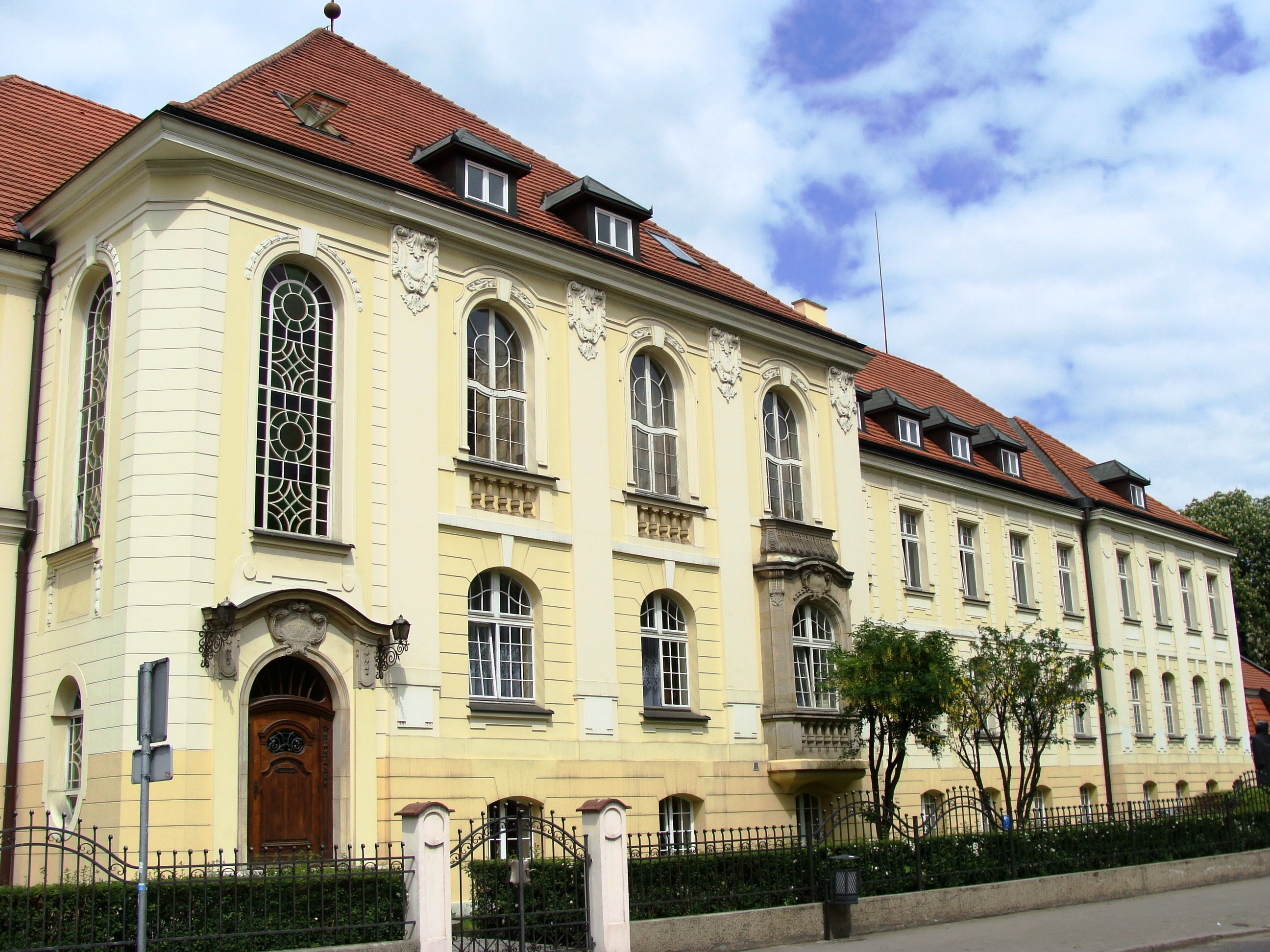
Eastern facade

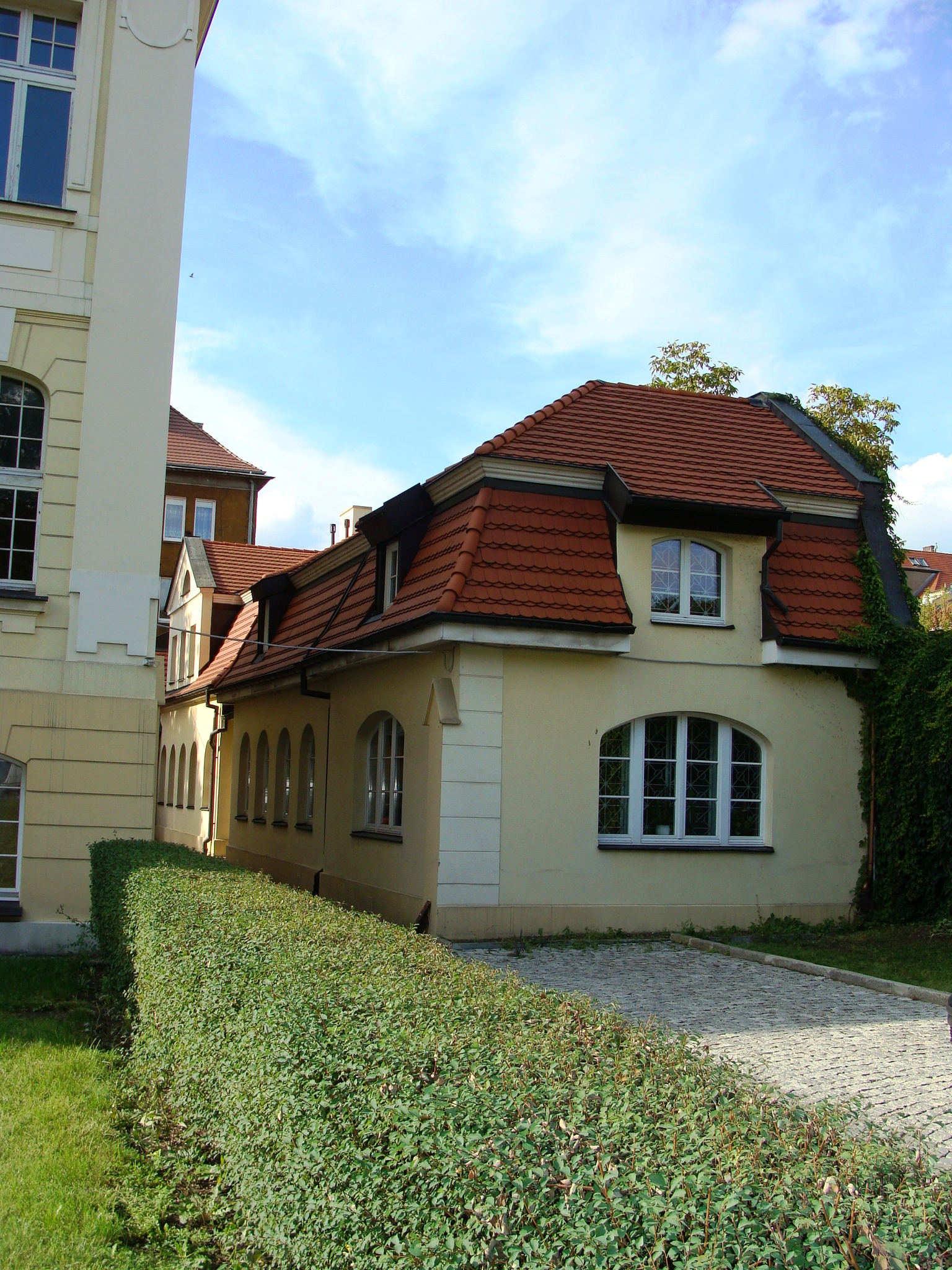
Northern annex building

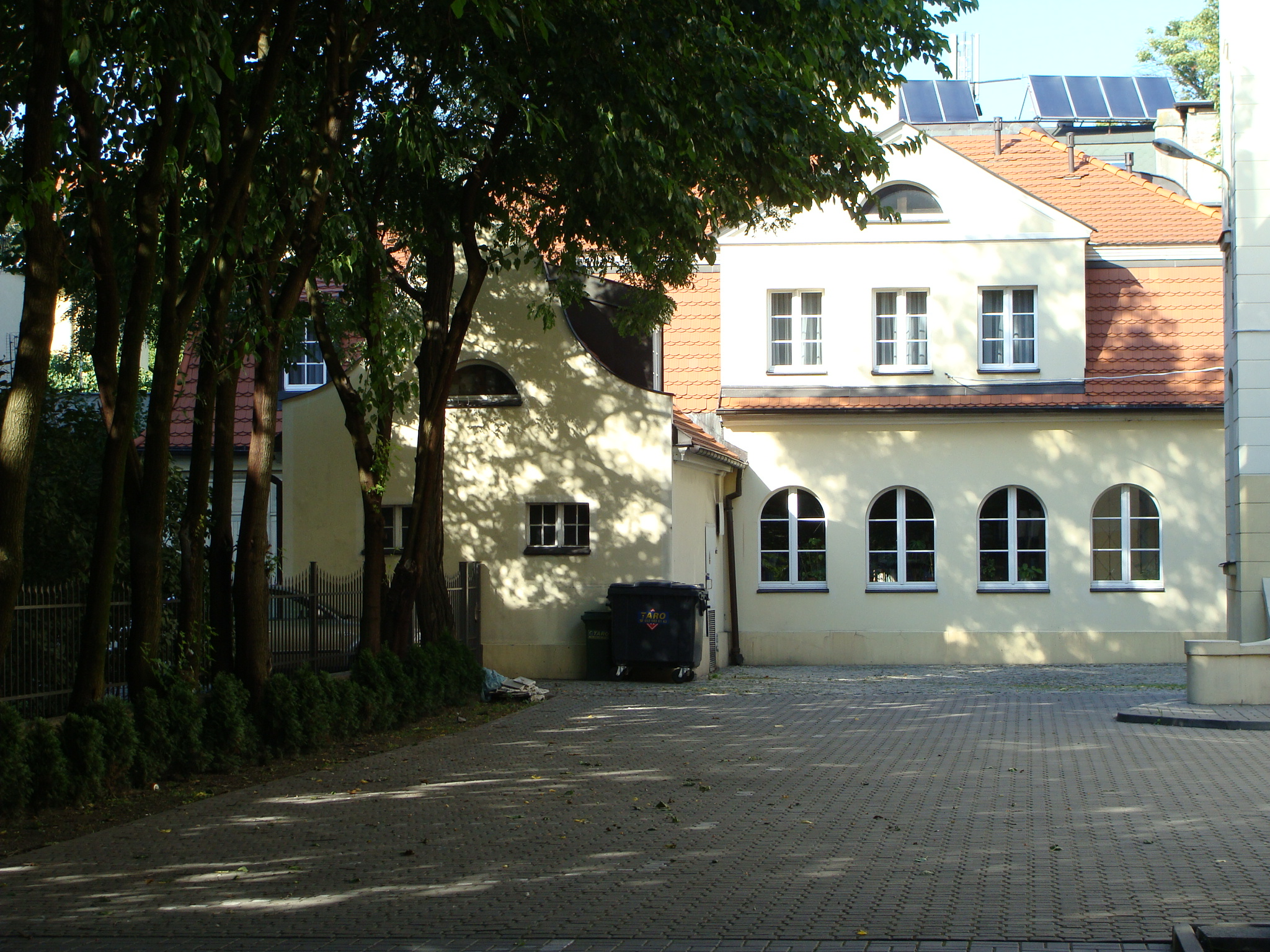
Northern annex building

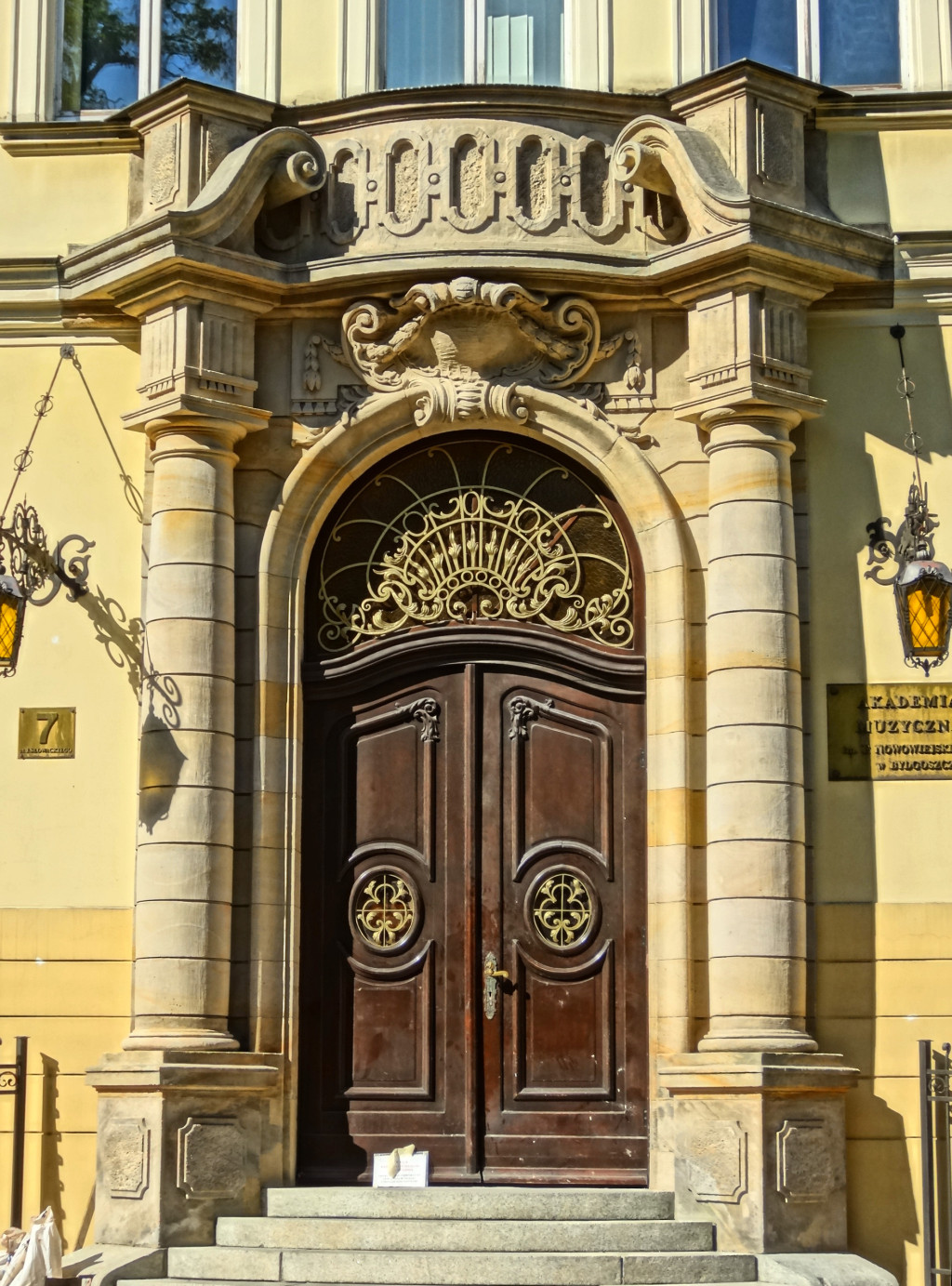
Detail of the portal

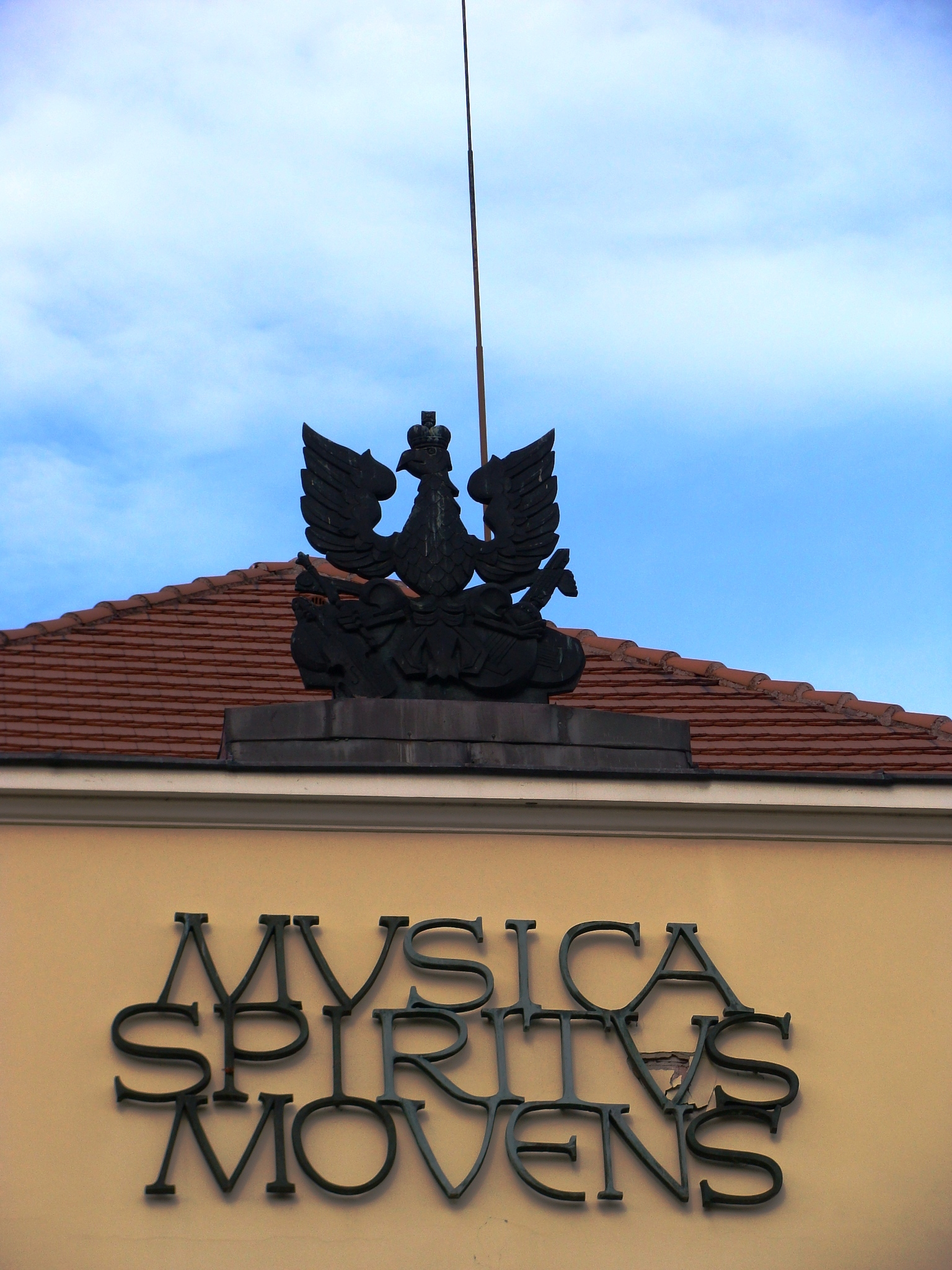
Motto and Polish Eagle

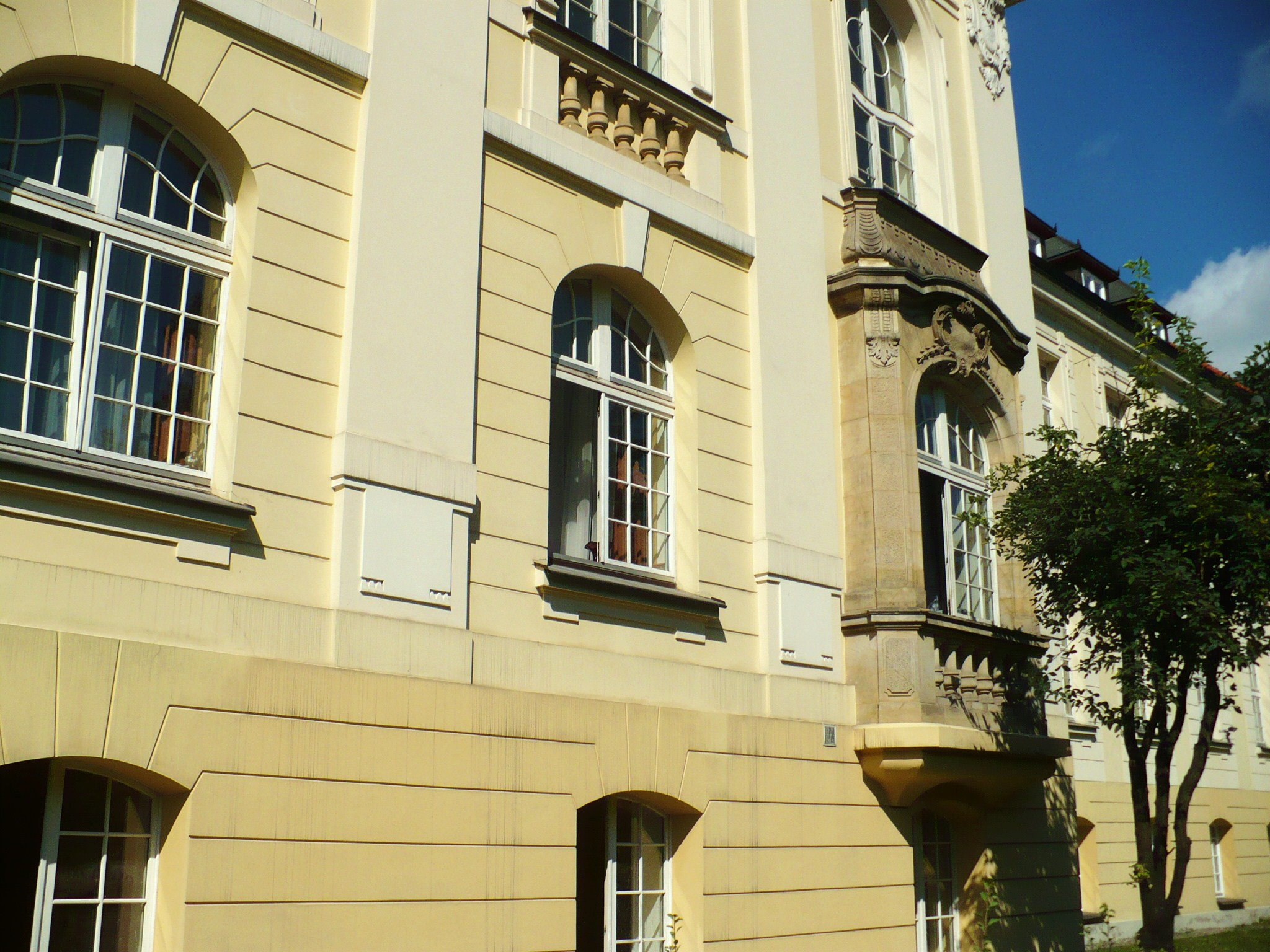
Bay window on the east side

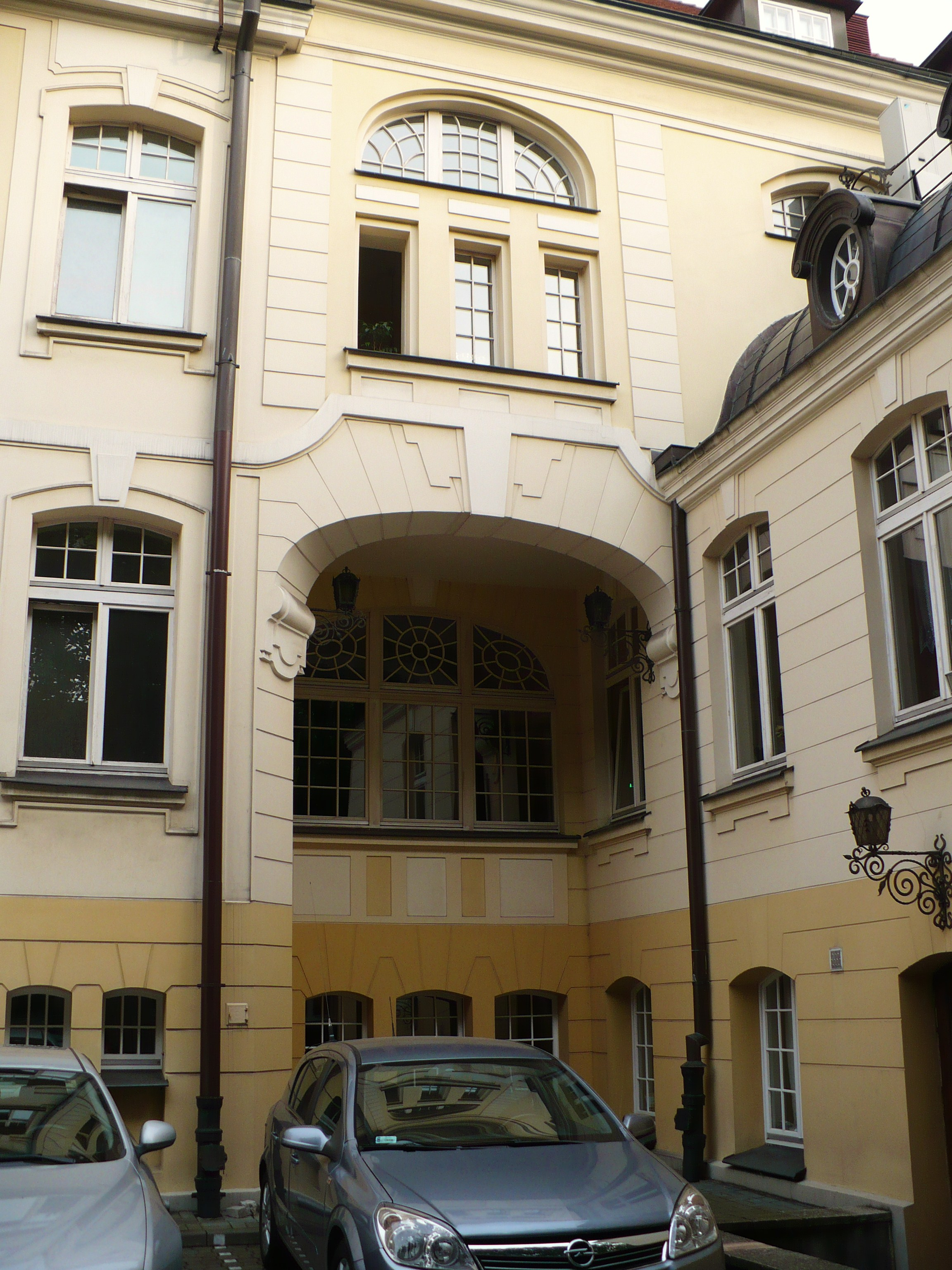
Courtyard, with an oeil-de-boeuf on the right roof

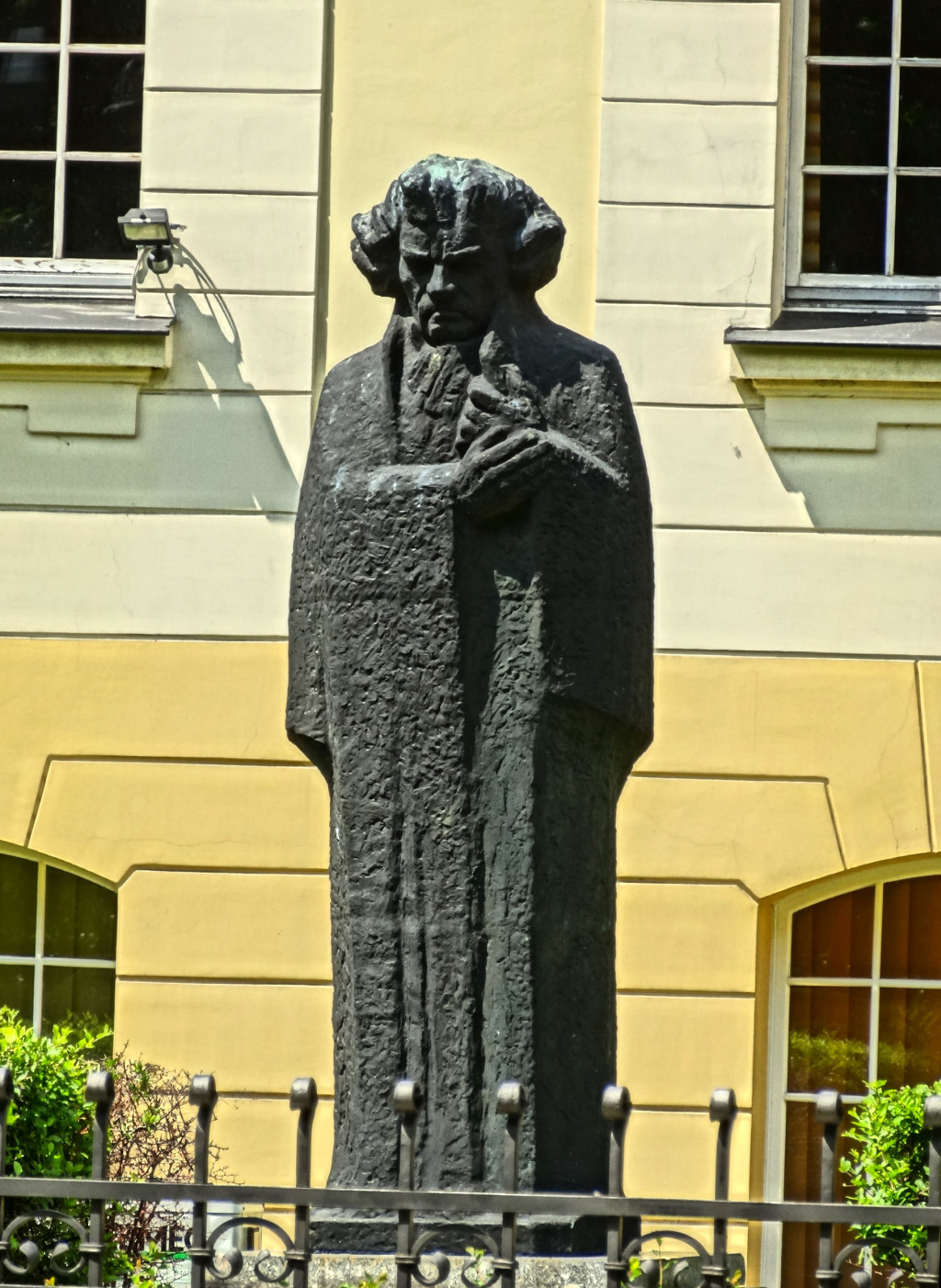
Statue of Ludwig van Beethoven on the eastern side

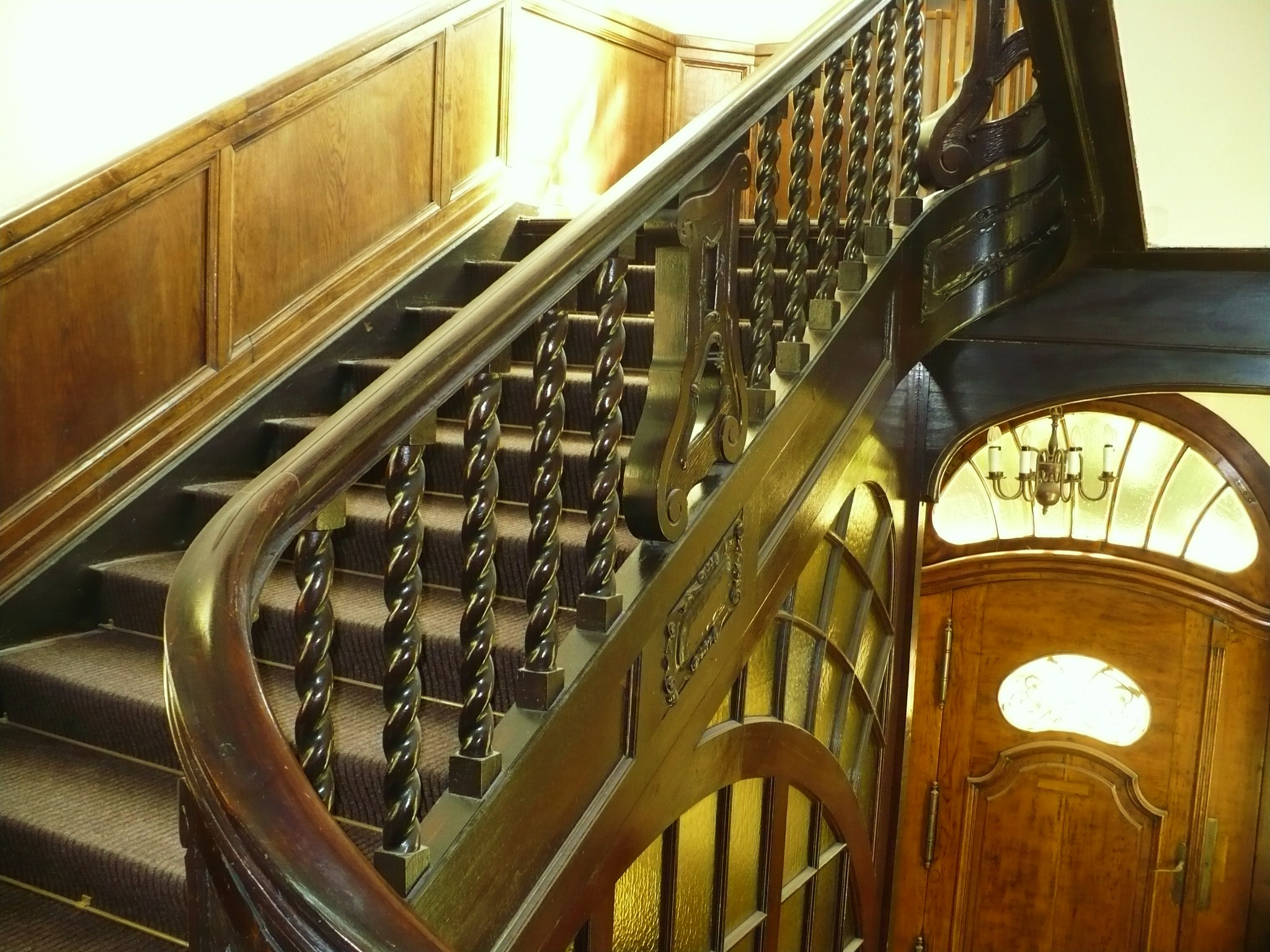
Oak staircase and railings

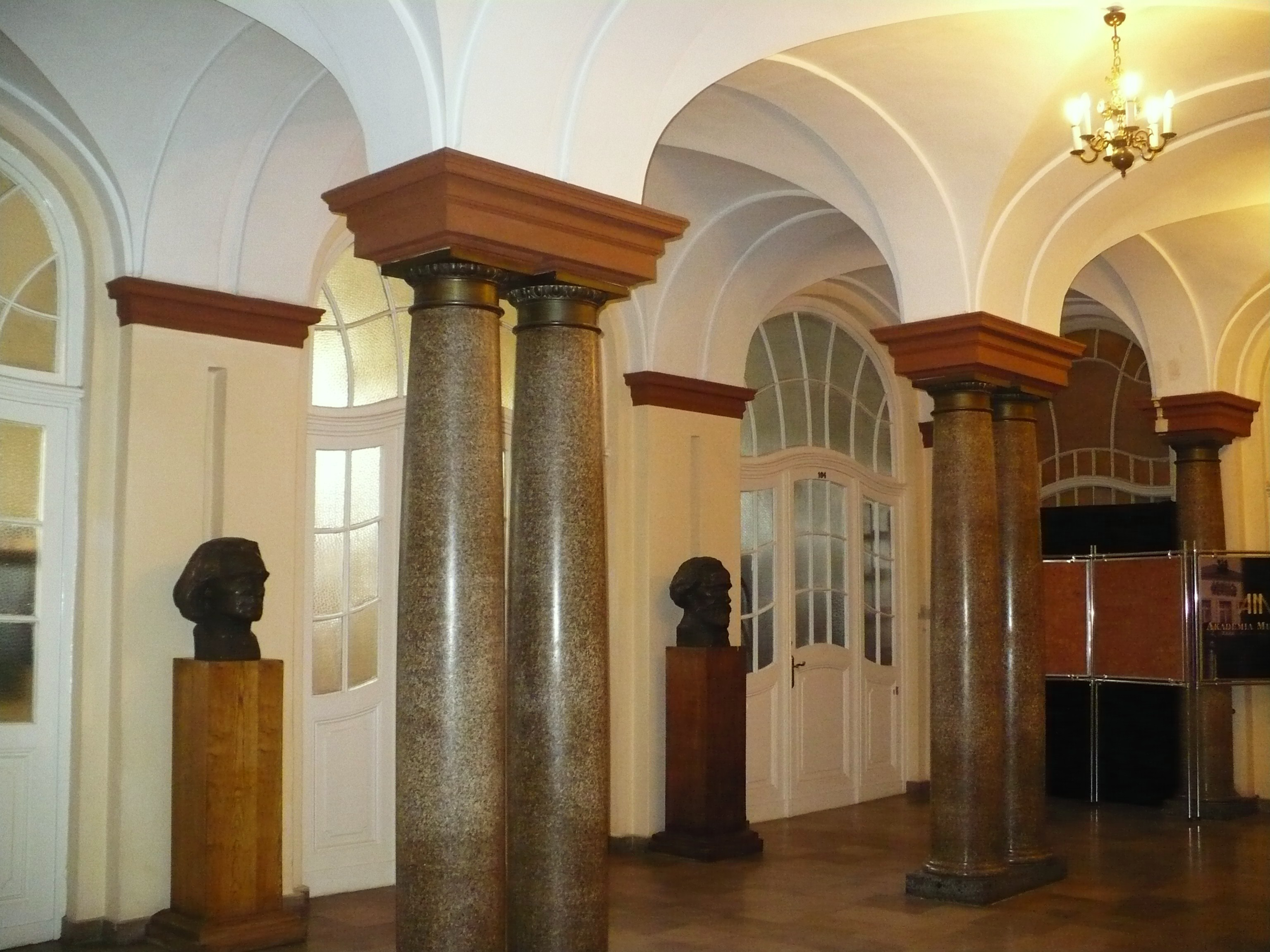
Vaulted ceiling corridor

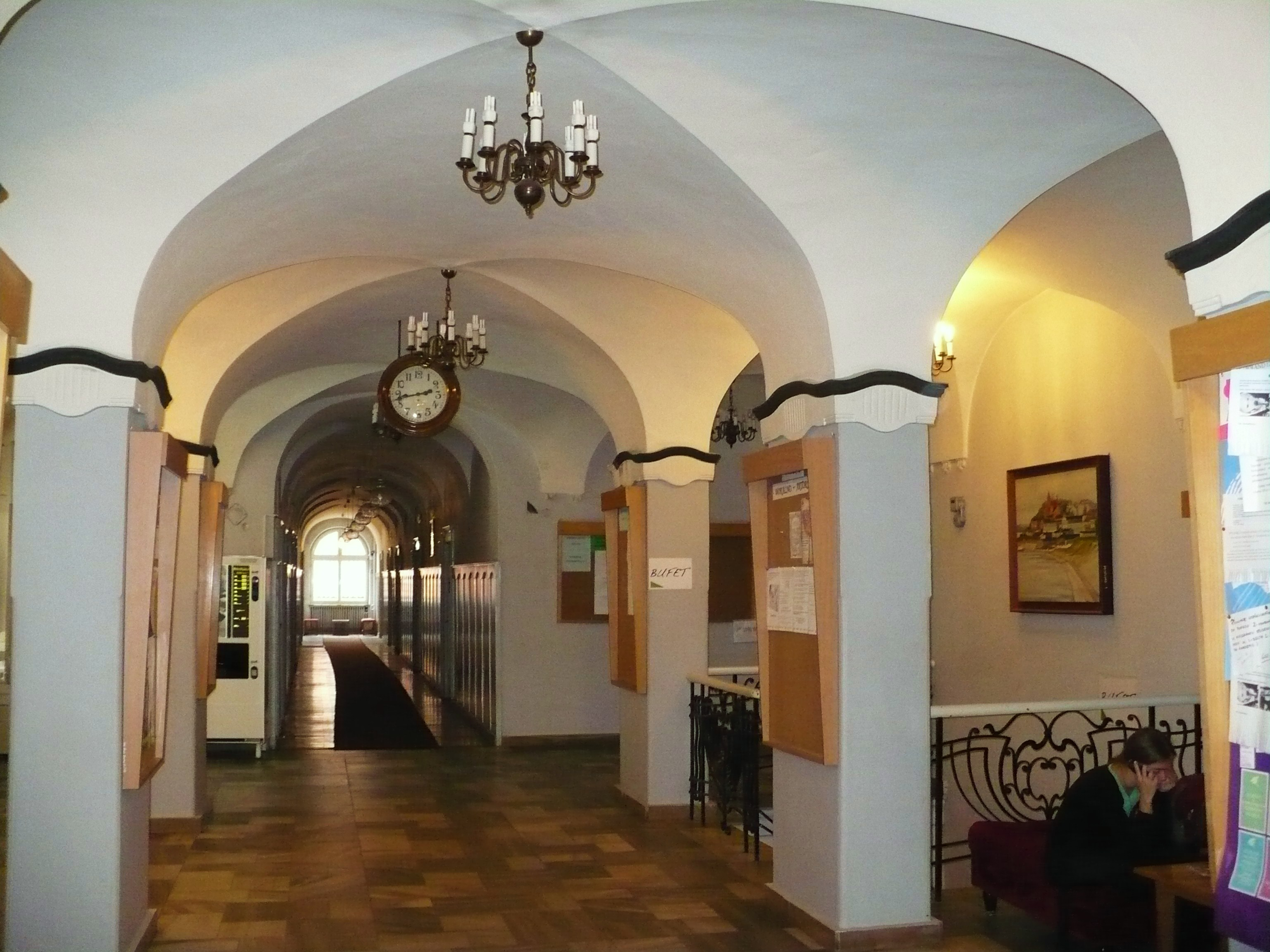
Interiors

== See also ==
- Bydgoszcz
- Bydgoszcz Music Academy - "Feliks Nowowiejski"
- Pomeranian Philharmonic
- Music Schools Group in Bydgoszcz
- Gdańska Street, Bydgoszcz
- Adam Mickiewicz Alley

== Bibliography ==
- (in Polish) Bręczewska-Kulesza, Daria (2002). Budynek starostwa powiatowego w Bydgoszczy. Kronika Bydgoska XXIV. Bydgoszcz: Towarzystwo Miłosnikow Miasta Bydgoszczy - Bydgoskie Towarzystwo Naukowe. pp. 311–314.
- (in Polish) Łukaszek, Ewa (1982). Państwowa Wyższa Szkoła Muzyczna im. Feliksa Nowowiejskiego. Kalendarz Bydgoski. Bydgoszcz: Towarzystwo Miłosnikow Miasta Bydgoszczy. pp. 22–26.
- (in Polish) Umiński, Janusz (1996). Bydgoszcz. Przewodnik. Bydgoszcz: Regionalny Oddział PTTK „Szlak Brdy”.
- (in Polish) Umiński, Janusz (1999). Ulica 20 Stycznia 1920 roku. Kalendarz Bydgoski. Bydgoszcz: Towarzystwo Miłośników Miasta Bydgoszczy. pp. 209–217.
- (in Polish) Parucka, Krystyna (2008). Zabytki Bydgoszczy – minikatalog. Bydgoszcz. ISBN 9788392719106.
