= Music Schools Group, Bydgoszcz =

Artur Rubinstein's Music Schools Group
- Polish: Zespół Szkół Muzycznych
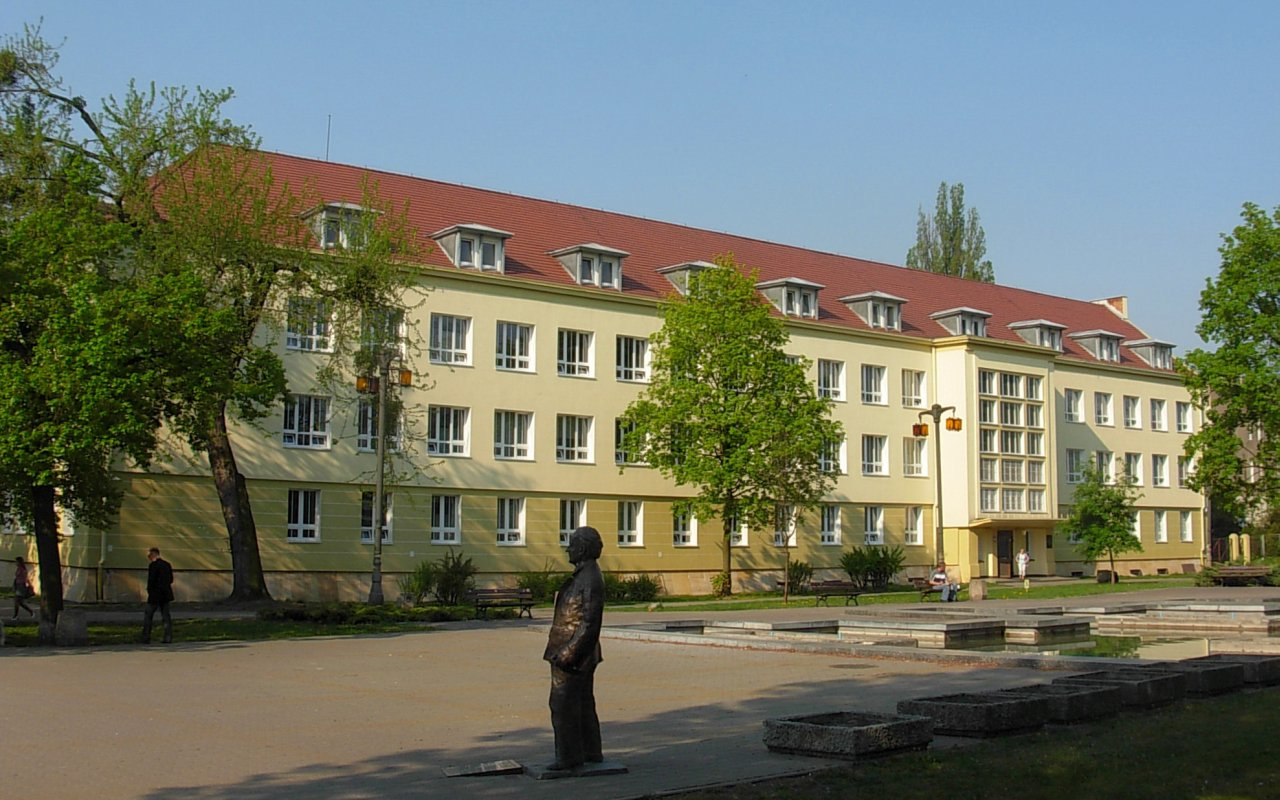

Location
- Szwalbego Street 1, Bydgoszcz; Poland; 53°7′45″N 18°00′31″E

Information
- Opened: 1925
- Principal: Joanna Derenda-Łukasik

The Arthur Rubinstein Music Schools Group is an association of music schools of primary and secondary education in Bydgoszcz, Poland. The seat is located in the building at Szwalbego Street 1.

== History ==
=== Interwar period ===
Polish music education began to develop in Bydgoszcz at the beginning of the 1920s, soon after the restoration of Second Polish Republic. Previously, since 1904, a German conservatoire located at 9 Adam Mickiewicz Alley had been educating more than 250 students and was continued under Baron Wilhelm von Winterfeld.

In 1921, the first Polish private music school has been created in Bydgoszcz, led by Leon Jaworski, a conductor educated in Regensburg. It was organized on the model of the German conservatoire, with three degrees of education: lower, upper and virtuoso. It received in 1936 a license from the Ministry of Religious Affairs and Public Enlightenment, but had to cease its operations with the outbreak of World War II.

Another Polish music school has been established, on the initiative of then mayor Bernard Śliwiński in 1925, under the name Municipal Institute of Music (Polish: Miejski Instytut Muzyczny or MIM), directed by Poznań-born pianist Zygmunt Lisicki. The seat of the school was in the Copernicanum, today's at Kopernika street 1, then moved to Paderewski street 32. Teaching staff were teachers from the Academy of Music in Poznań, teaching in three levels, lower, middle and higher.

In 1927, the MIM was reorganized under the lead of professor Zdzislaw Jahnke, and renamed the Municipal Conservatoire of Music, with public school rights; albeit a private school, it was partly subsidized by the City Council of Bydgoszcz. Teaching of the numerous pupils (160 in 1927) from 1927 to 1938 was carried out in a rented building at 14 Piotra Skargi Street, and then at 71 Gdańska Street. The Music School was organized in departments:

- Music theory,
- Conducting,
- Piano,
- Orchestral instruments,
- Singing,
- Liturgical music
- Pipe organ,
- Pedagogy seminar.

The Bydgoszcz academic music school diploma was treated in the 1930s and till World War II on equal footing with diplomas from other higher music academies in Poland. Educators came partly from Poznań, but most came from other universities abroad (Leipzig, Weimar, Berlin, Saint Petersburg, Geneva, Hamburg).

During the interwar period, the Municipal Conservatory of Music became an important part of the cultural life of the city thanks to its extensive performances: soloists, chamber orchestra, choir, symphony orchestra, oratorio. In 1932, the school established the Collegium Musicum, composed of teachers, to play like a symphony orchestra with choir. All those activities were a portent of the 1953 Pomeranian Philharmonic. In 1939, the Collegium Musicum realized 24 concerts in the Municipal Theatre.

=== German occupation ===
During World War II, the school building was confiscated by Nazis authorities: they opened in 1941 a Municipal School of Music (German: Musikschule der Stadt Bromberg), directed by German organist Georg Juedeke. The institution comprised schools for teenagers (German: Jugendmusikschule für Hitlerjugend, Bund Deutsche Mädel) and for adults (German: Musikschule des Deutschen Volksbildungsweikes). Lessons for young children were focused on singing, piano, bowed string instruments, wind instruments, orchestras and music theory, and for adults dedicated to instruments, singing and orchestra. The school was closed in December 1944.

=== Postwar period ===
Immediately after the cessation of hostilities in Bydgoszcz, in February 1945, the activities of the Municipal Conservatoire resumed in the pre-war building at 71 Gdańska Street and in the former German Conservatory of Music at 54 Gdańska Street. In 1946, with the monopoly of instruction given to state schools, private music institutions closed down. The Municipal Conservatory of Music was transformed into a cooperative of musicians under the name Pomeranian Medium and Lower Musical School in Bydgoszcz, with an organization not so much changed from the pre-war structure. In 1946–1947 the school trained 60 students, and among the teachers were musicians-virtuosos like composer Florian Dabrowski, Jerzy Jasieński, Felicja Krysiewicz, Edmund Rezler, Marta Suchecka, Maria Wasiak, Halina Wojciechowska, Zdzisława Wojciechowska and others.

In 1947, the institution was divided into two distinct schools: the lower Music School (director Maria Tołłoczko) and the Secondary School of Music (director Irena Jahnke). The former took the name of State Primary School of Music in 1952, the latter was renamed State Secondary School of Music. Despite the efforts of Bydgoszcz teachers to restore the higher Music school (third course), this level of teaching was established in 1947 in Gdańsk. In the 1950s, schools were reorganized. In the primary school two specialties (piano and violin) were kept, with the possibility of learning another instrument in the higher grades, while high school created three departments: instruments, singing and pedagogy. At the same time in both institutions general education was combined with music teaching, and it is still the case today. During the 23 years of existence of Bydgoszcz Music School, 400 students have been graduated, among whom Janusz Stanecki, Krzysztof Herdzin, Eleonora Harendarska and Alicja Weber. The teaching staff of Music Schools group were also members of orchestras such as Polish Radio Symphony Orchestra in Bydgoszcz, Pomeranian Symphony Orchestra, Capella Bydgostiensis, as well as teachers in other music universities like Poznań and Gdańsk

In 1960, a music school Emil Młynarski for advanced training of musicians and teachers has been established. It was converted in the 1970s to a Second degree high School of Music. Lessons took place at the Department of instruments and vocals. In 1974, a higher musical curriculum was eventually created in Bydgoszcz, the Bydgoszcz Music Academy - "Feliks Nowowiejski".

Main seat for both schools was the tenement at Gdańska Street 71. In 1954 the primary school, moved from Gdańska Street 54 to the current building at Szwalbego Street 1, a throw stone from the Pomeranian Philharmonic building. In 1975, all the music schools in Bydgoszcz have been combined into the Group of Bydgoszcz Music Schools . It encompassed the Primary Music School, the High School of Music, and the Second degree high school of music.

Directors of the Music Schools group have been Zdzisław Starniewski (1975–1984), Wacław Kłaput (1984–1990) and Ewa Stąporek-Pospiech since 1990.

On November 4, 1991, the School group received the namesake of pianist Artur Rubinstein. To celebrate this patron, an International Competition for Young Pianists "Arthur Rubinstein in memoriam" has been organized since 1993 every other year. The internal activity in schools is regularly enriched by the emergence of new bands of high school students (brass band, choir, chamber orchestra, percussion bands).

== Locations ==
Bydgoszcz music schools are housed in two separate buildings at:

- Szwalbego Street 1, in the immediate vicinity of the Pomeranian Philharmonic building, the Main building of Bydgoszcz Music Academy and the Polish Radio of Kuyavy Pomerania. It comprises classrooms for individual and group activities, rhythm and music theory lessons. The building also hosts classes of general education primary and secondary school, together with a gym hall and administration offices.
- Gdańsk Street 71, which includes classrooms for -among others- piano, singing, harp and percussion activities. It also houses a concert hall for instrumental auditions (piano, drums, bass, guitar, harp, and organ).

== Organization ==
The school comprises:

- School of Music – first degree (six-year course);
- School of Music – second degree (six-year course);
- State School of Music- first degree (six-year course);
- State School of Music- second degree (six-year course). In the vocal department, prepares for the profession of singer musician;
- Talent class, founded in 2009. For advanced gifted students, this class proposes individual course and specific education by Academy teachers.

The school has curriculum on the following instruments:

- Keyboard – piano, pipe organ, accordion, harpsichord;
- Wind – flute, oboe, clarinet, saxophone, bassoon, trumpet, French horn trombone, tuba;
- Percussion – bass drum, tambourine, triangle;
- String – violin, viola, cello, double bass;
- Guitar and harp.

== Ensembles ==
=== School Symphony Orchestra ===
The school symphony orchestra was founded in the 1930s. A school Orchestra appeared in April 1939 at the Municipal Conservatory of Music, led before World War II by Zdzislaw Jahnke and Alfons Rezler, and after 1945 by Wacław Splewiński and Feliks Rybicki. Since 1996, the orchestra is directed by Henryk Wierzchoń.

The orchestra takes an active part in the musical life of the region and the country, including tours (Germany, Finland). The repertoire covers about 50 pieces of classical music. The School Symphony Orchestra of Bydoszcz performed twice at the National Philharmonic in Warsaw (1998, 2001). It performs regularly on the stage of the Pomeranian Philharmonic, in particular for school ceremonies, and charity concerts in coordination with cultural institutions of the city. It also takes part in many competitions and festivals in Bydgoszcz, the region and the country.

=== Choir – Coro Rubinstein ===
In addition to the orchestra, a very important place in the school is given to choir. Since 1997, the choir is conducted by Aleksandra Grucza-Rogalska.

At its creation, the choir consisted of female voices, but from 2013 it is a mixed choir. It performs in many occasions, at school ceremonies and for city cultural events. The band won awards in various competitions. Its recent successes are two gold diplomas awarded during the 17th competition Cantio Lodziensis in Łódź and 7th National Competition in Bydgoszcz Pieśni Pasyjnej.

=== Other ===
High school students participate in performances of instrumental ensembles (string quartets, brass, vocal), vocal and vocal-acting, marching bands, choirs, percussion bands, piano duos etc.

== Competitions ==
The school organizes the following competitions and festivals:

- The International Competition for Young Pianists Arthur Rubinstein in memoriam (every 2 years, in April);
- The National Vocal Competition Felicja Krysiewicz (every year, in May);
- The National Cello Confrontations Zdzisława Wojciechowska (every year, in May).

== Gallery ==
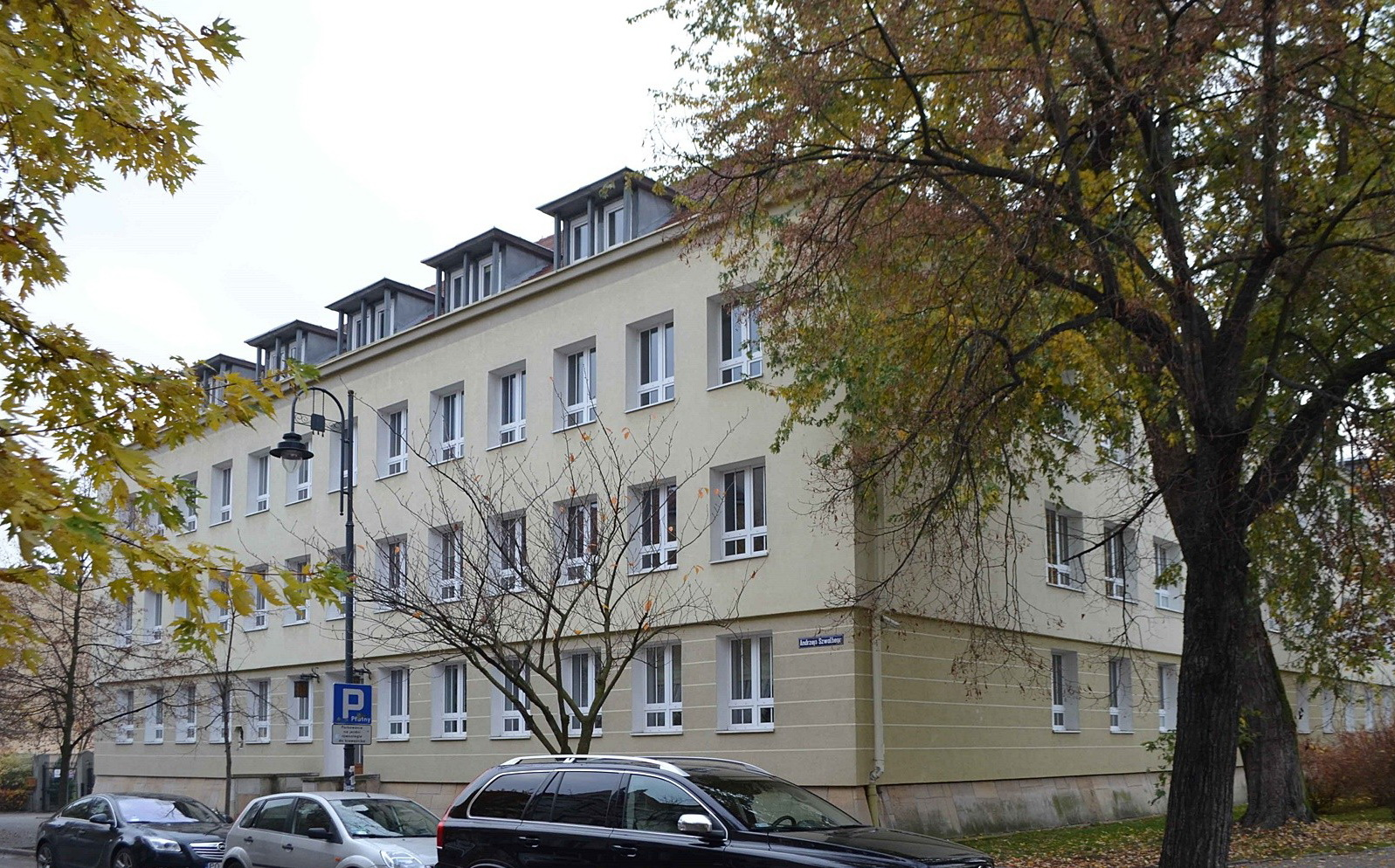
View from Szwalbego street

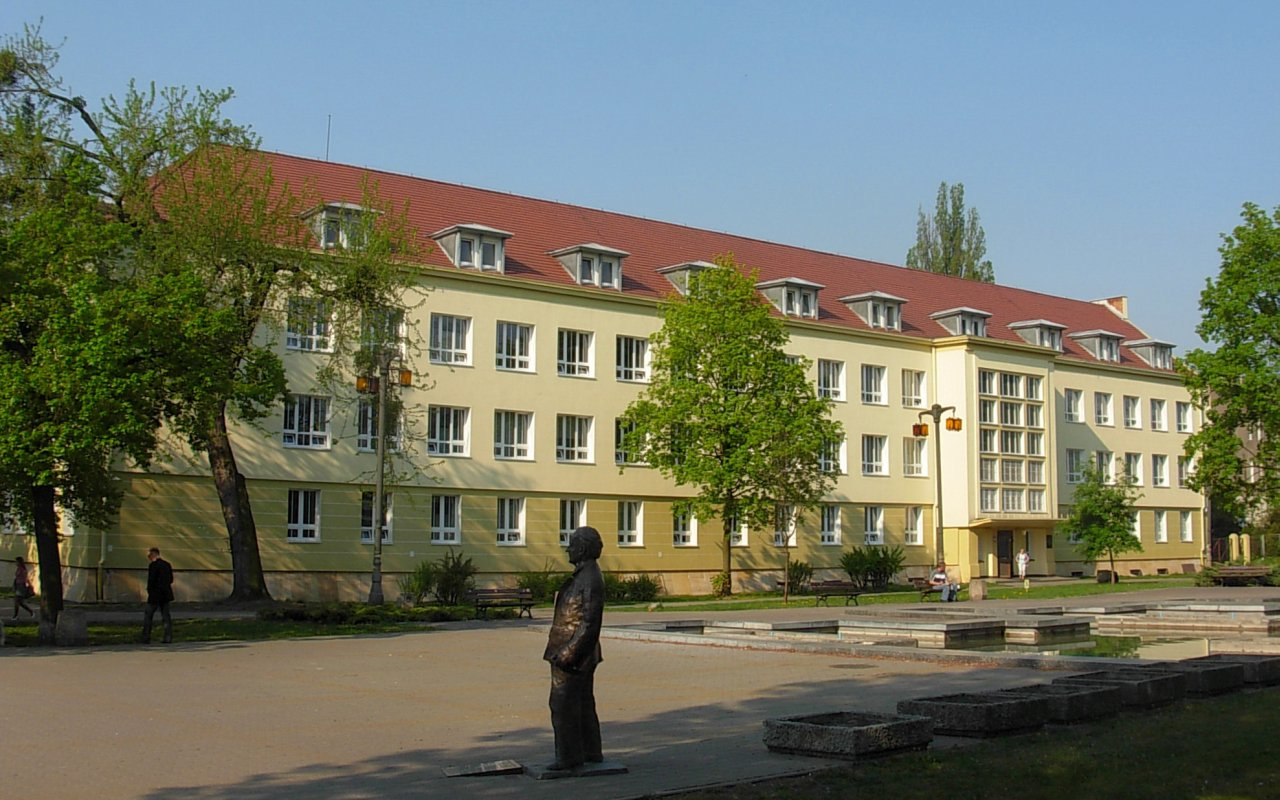
View from the square. Statue of Andrzej Szwalbe on the foreground

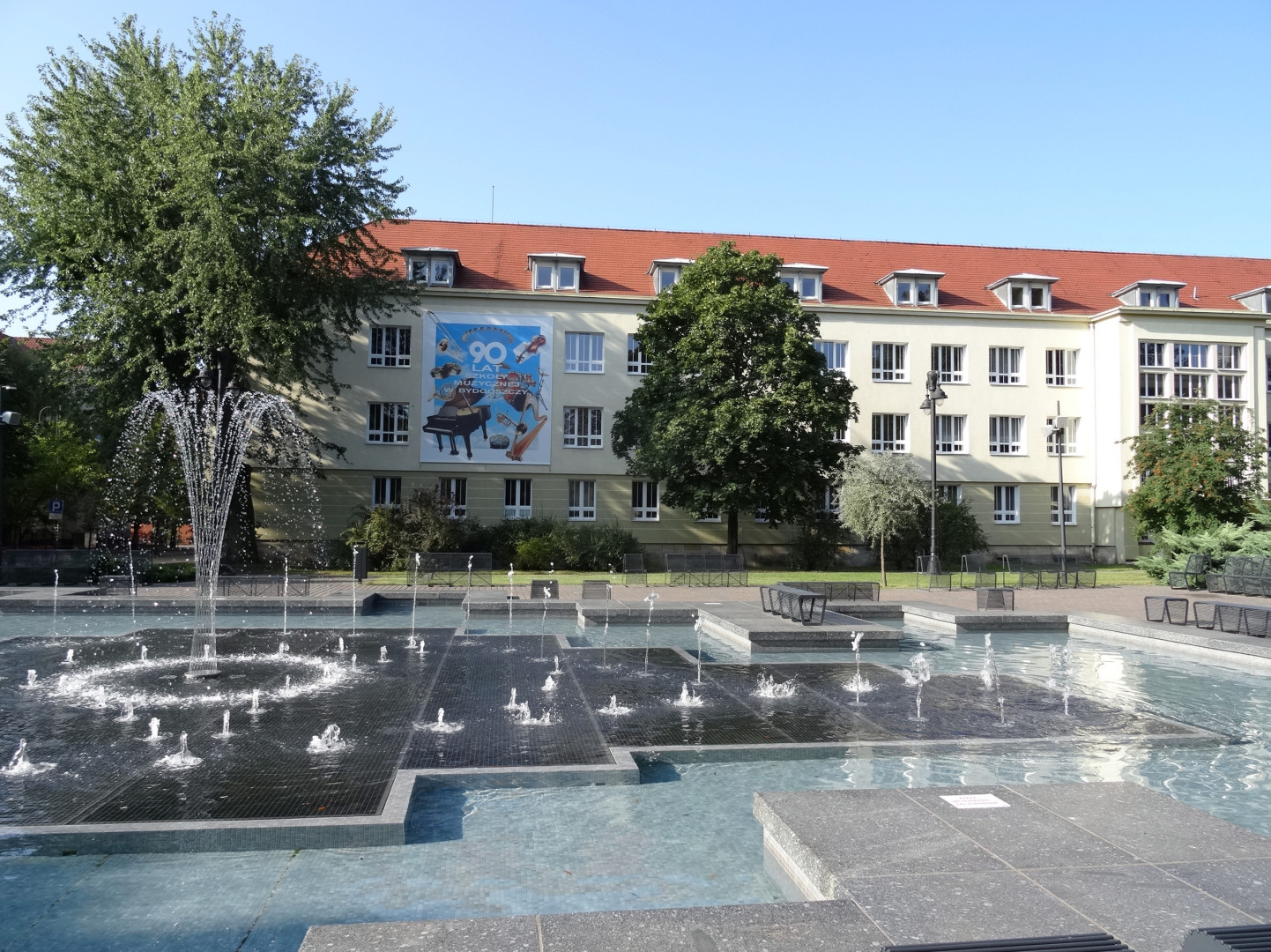
View with the multimedia fountain

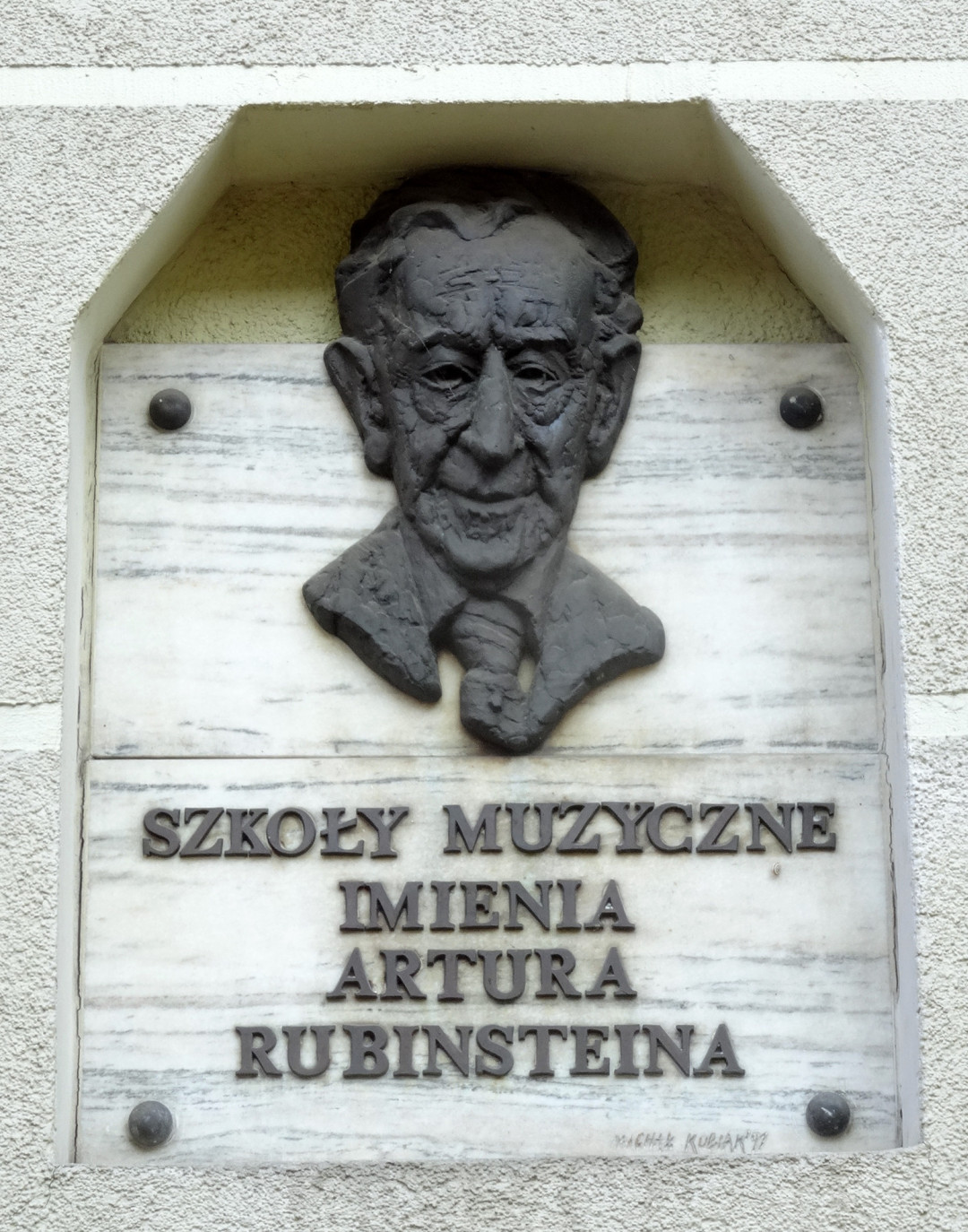
Sculpture commemorating Artur Rubinstein school patroning

== See also ==
- Bydgoszcz
- Bydgoszcz Music Academy - "Feliks Nowowiejski"
- Pomeranian Philharmonic
- Music Schools Group in Bydgoszcz

== Bibliography ==
- Bloch, Maria (1996). Mali muzycy bydgoscy i dzieje ich szkoły. Kalendarz Bydgoski (in Polish). Bydgoszcz: Towarzystwo Miłosnikow Miasta Bydgoszczy. pp. 266–279.
- Maniszewska, Małgorzata (2002). Miasto muzyki. Kalendarz Bydgoski (in Polish). Bydgoszcz: Towarzystwo Miłosnikow Miasta Bydgoszczy.
- Nowak, Anna-Maria (2002). Szkolnictwo muzyczne w XX wieku. Kalendarz Bydgoski (in Polish). Bydgoszcz: Towarzystwo Miłosnikow Miasta Bydgoszczy.
- Pruss Zdzisław, Weber Alicja, Kuczma Rajmund (2004). Bydgoski leksykon muzyczny (in Polish). Bydgoszcz: Kujawsko-Pomorskie Towarzystwo Kulturalne.
