= Feliks Nowowiejski Music Academy =

Coordinates: 53.1297°N 18.0097°E

Feliks Nowowiejski Academy of Music in Bydgoszcz
- Polish: Akademia Muzyczna im. Feliksa Nowowiejskiego w Bydgoszczy
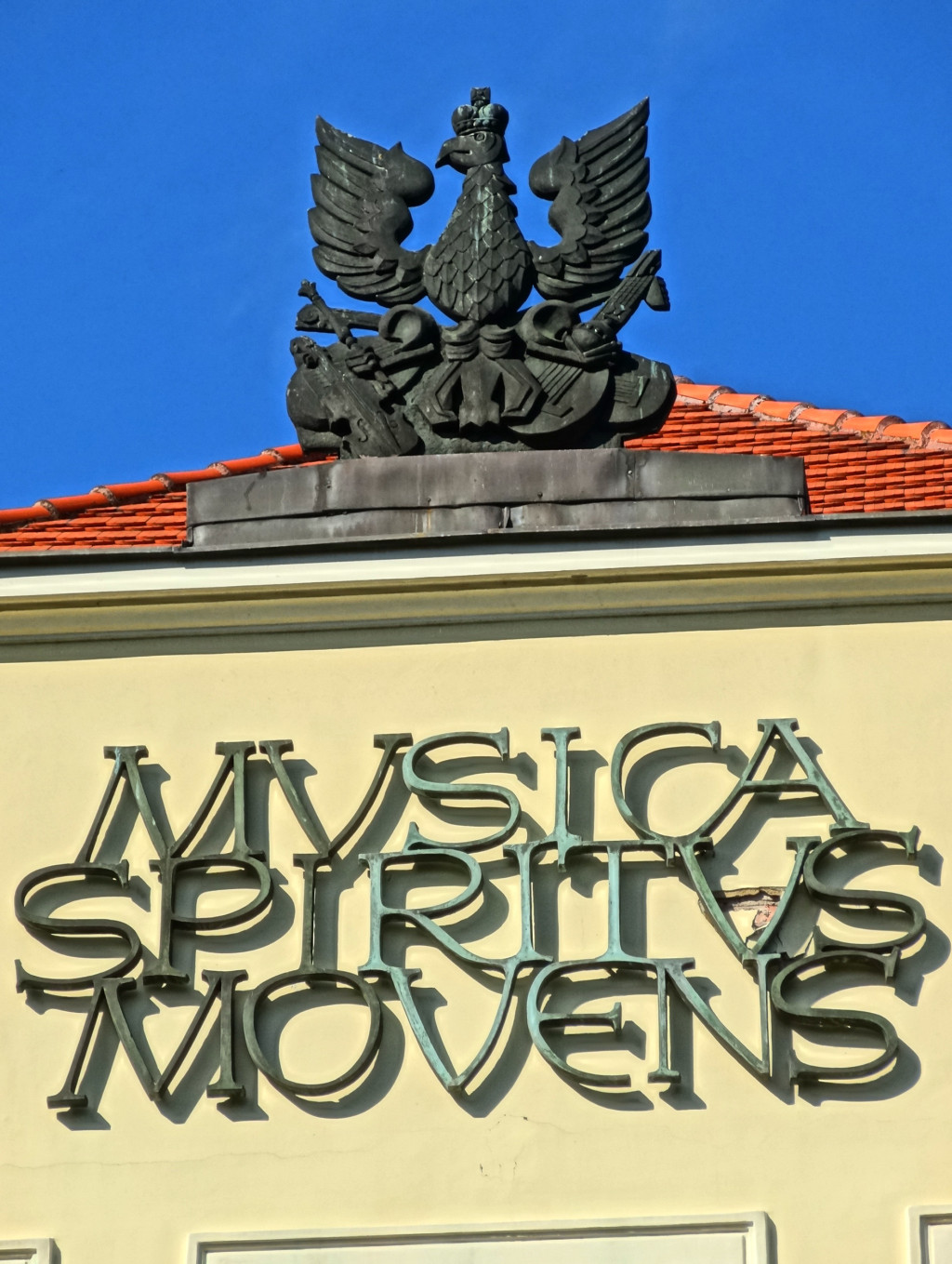
- Motto of the Academy at the main building entrance
- Motto: Musica Spiritus Movens
- Motto in English: Music moves the soul
- Type: Music Academy
- Established: 1 October 1974
- Parent institution: Academy of Music in Łódź
- President: Jerzy Kaszuba
- Vice-president: Maria Murawska, Hanna Michalak
- Academic staff: 147 (2016)
- Students: 552 (2015)
- Location: Slowackiego street 7, Bydgoszcz, Kuyavian-Pomeranian Voivodeship, 85-008, Poland
- Language: Polish / English
- Website: amuz.bydgoszcz.pl

The Feliks Nowowiejski Academy of Music (Polish: Akademia Muzyczna im. Feliksa Nowowiejskiego w Bydgoszczy; AMFN) is a Polish state music university located in downtown Bydgoszcz. Its origins date back to 1974, as branch of the Music College in Łódź (Polish: Filia Wyższej Szkoły Muzycznej w Łodzi) until 1979. At that point it was established as independent Bydgoszcz State College of Music (Polish: Państwowa Wyższa Szkoła Muzyczna), consisting of four departments. The current name was adopted in 1981.

== Patron ==
Since 1 December 1981, the patron of the music university is Feliks Nowowiejski (1877–1946), a Polish composer, conductor, teacher, organist and virtuoso.

Living in Poznań since 1919, Feliks Nowowiejski repeatedly visited Bydgoszcz in the interwar period as a conductor and composer. On 3 April 1921, he conducted in Bydgoszcz the local choir "Halka" in a room on Torunska street, and on 18 November 1923, he led a concert in the Seminar Building on the occasion of the 5th anniversary of Polish independence. One of the large-scale event he attended was the unveiling of the Monument to Henryk Sienkiewicz in Bydgoszcz, the first at the time in Poland, on 31 July 1927. During the ceremony, in the presence of President of Poland Ignacy Mościcki, Feliks Nowowiejski conducted a solemn concert performed by the orchestra of the 68th Infantry Regiment and combined choirs of Bydgoszcz and Poznań.

== History ==
=== Pre-war traditions ===
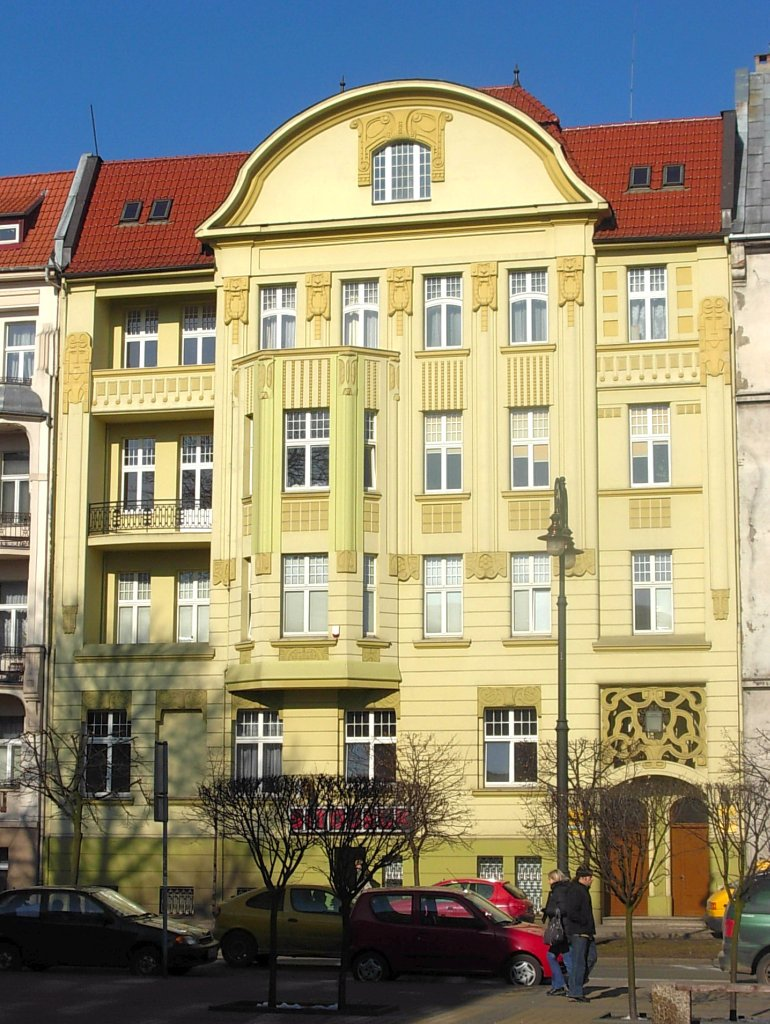
Building at Mickiewicz Alley 9, location of the Bromberger Conservatory für Musik

Institutionalized teaching traditions for future artists and musicians started in the city here at the beginning of the 20th century. Prior to this time, music teaching habits developed already, in the building of the parochial school as well as schools of the Carmelite Monastery (now defunct, at the location of the Theatre square) and the Jesuit College (now the city hall).

In 1904, Arnold Schattschneider (a conductor) and Wilhelm von Winterfeld (a violinist, conductor and composer) founded the Bromberg Conservatory of Music (German: Bromberger Conservatory für Musik), at Adam Mickiewicz Alley 9, which performed its activities until 1945.

After the restoration of the Second Polish Republic, Bydgoszcz started to develop music education. Main elements of this movement in the years 1925–1927, were the Municipal Institute of Music (Polish: Miejski Instytut Muzyczny) and the Municipal Conservatory of Music, founded in 1927 by Zdzislaw Jahnke, a professor in Poznań Conservatory. The Jahnke conservatory, like the German Conservatory of von Winterfefd, led teaching music at three levels (lower, middle and higher-academic), and the structure of the school consisted of 8 departments (singing, piano, orchestral instruments, liturgical music, pipe organ, group music, pedagogical seminar, music theory and other additional subjects).

During interwar period, the Municipal Conservatory of Music raised as the leading music school in the city, thanks to the quality of the pedagogical team: among them was Józef Paderewski (1871–1958), brother of Ignacy Jan Paderewski. Bydgoszcz conservatories trained many respected musicians and music educators, including Alfons Rezler (conductor, founder of the Municipal Symphony Orchestra in 1938) and Marta Suchecka (violinist, educator).

During the Nazi occupation, the Municipal Conservatory of Music has been converted into a German school. Von Winterfeld Conservatory of Music ceased its activities in 1944, after the death of its director.

=== Post-war attempts (1945–1974) ===
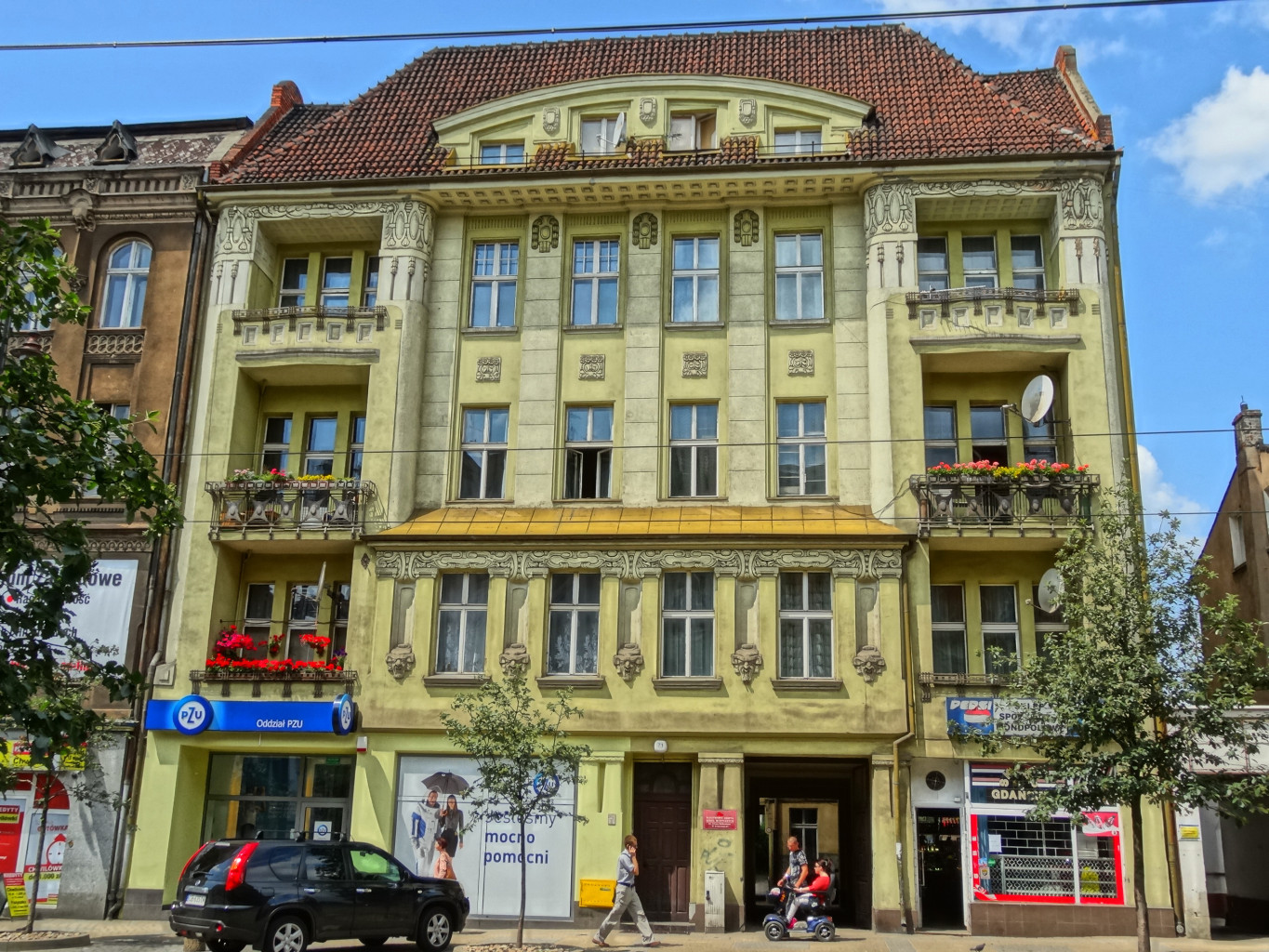
Tenement at Gdańska street 71, seat of the Municipal Conservatoire since 1939

After the end of World War II, the process of rebuilding a music education system in the city started over. The Municipal Conservatory of Music resumed its activities, in its own building at Gdańsk Street 71. The school kept its instruments and an almost its complete teaching staff. However, within the new socio-political education system, the Conservatory was soon nationalized. As a result, and several years later, emerged the Primary Music School and the State Secondary School of Music.

Although since 1946, Bydgoszcz put efforts to have a Music University created, ministerial decisions only established an Academy of Music in Gdańsk. In parallel, in the 1950s, several musical institutions were established in Bydgoszcz:

- Pomeranian Philharmonic;
- Opera Studio;
- First and Second degree Music schools.

This movement intensified the needs of a local environment regarding higher musical education, as regularly advocated in the 1960s by Andrzej Szwalbe, director of the Pomeranian Philharmonic and Konrad Palubicki, professor of the national State Academy of Music in Gdańsk.

=== Branch of the Music College in Łódź (1974–1979) ===
The efforts to set up a Music Academy in Bydgoszcz found the support of the central government in July 1974. This approval allowed the rector of the College of Music in Łódź, Zenon Ploszaj, to establish a branch of the school on 1 October 1974, in Bydgoszcz.

On 1 October 1975, first classes began with 25 students of the Instrumental Faculty, led by Deputy Dean and manager of the academy, Miroslaw Pietkiewicz. Initially, the classes were conducted in the halls of the Pomeranian Philharmonic and the Music School, and lectures performed by professors coming from Łódź. Part of the staff consisted of musicians from the Pomeranian Symphony Orchestra and Capella Bydgostiensis, the Chamber music ensemble.

In 1976, a Musical Education department was created and the academy moved into its main building, provided by the voivodeship at Slowackiego street 7, which still remains its headquarters today.

In April 1979, student dormitories were established at Libelta street 14, thanks to the help provided by Andrzej Szwalbe, the then-director of the Pomeranian Philharmonic. Between 1977 and 1979, a major took place at Slowackiego street 7 so as to adapt interiors to the needs of musical teaching. In September 1979, the building housed a national congress of art schools rectors.

=== Bydgoszcz State College of Music (1979–1981) ===
On 27 November 1979, Polish Council of Ministers created a State College of Music, independent from the Academy of Music in Łódź. Its first rector was Roman Suchecki.

Soon in 1980, the university reached its full working structure, similar to other music schools in the country, with the creation of two new departments: the Faculty of Music Theory and Composition, and the Faculty of Vocal Performance and Acting. In the same year an Instrumental Pedagogy School (Faculty of Instrumental Music) and a recording studio were established.

The academic year 1979/1980 welcomed 120 students, crowned by a tour of the Academic Symphony Orchestra, composed of university pupils.

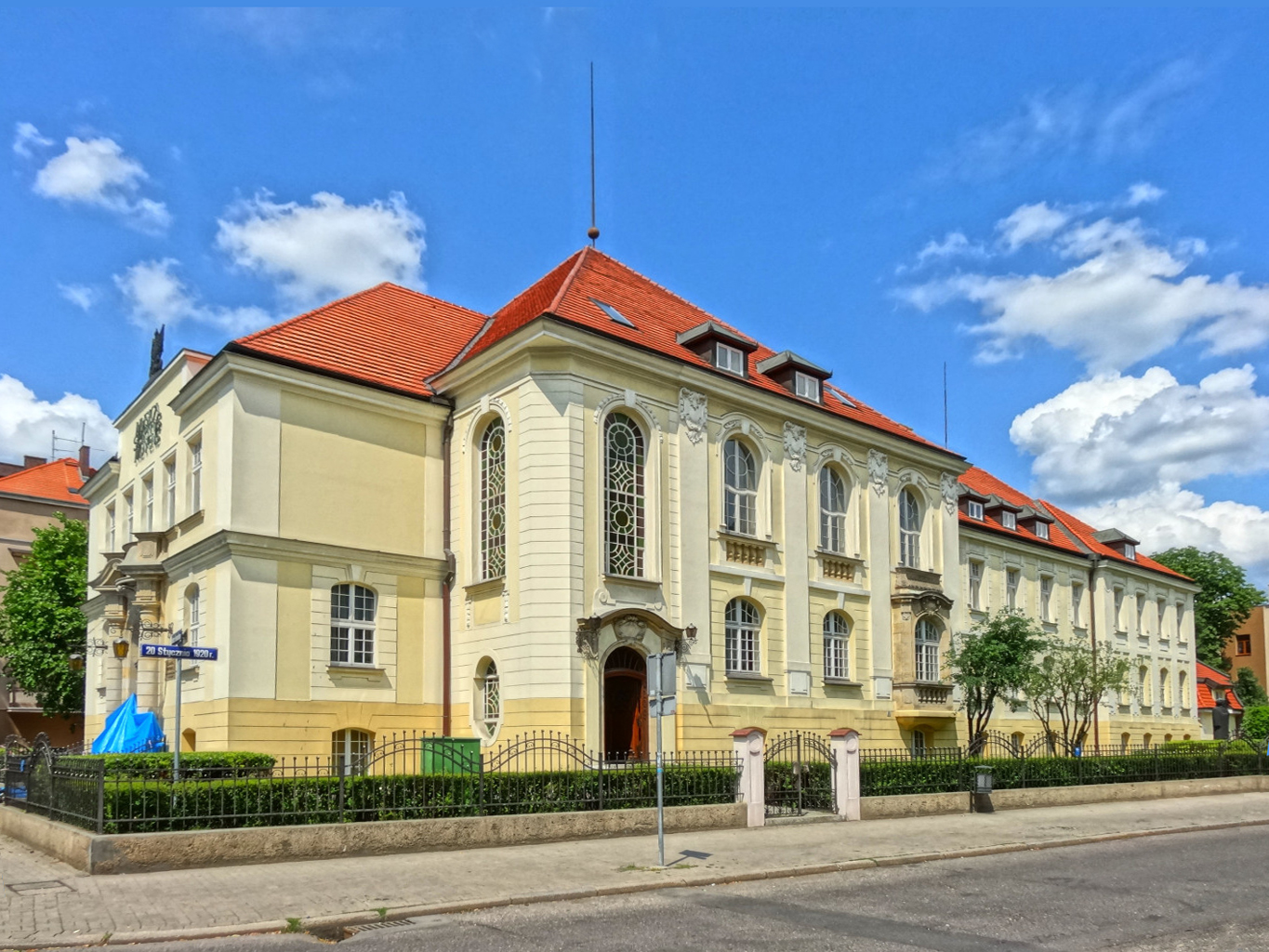
Main building of the academy

=== Bydgoszcz Academy of Music (since 1981) ===
On 1 December 1981, the university was renamed to Feliks Nowowiejski Academy of Music, completing its integration among the other Polish music academies. The latin motto of the university Musica spiritus movens (Music moves spirit) has been then placed at the front of the building beside a crowned eagle.

In the 1980s, effort was put into training teachers and launching research units, in order replace the original pedagogic staff, mostly consisting of teachers commuting from Łódź, Poznań, Gdańsk, Warsaw and Kraków. The local teaching team was established in the 1990s. Gradually new departments and positions were introduced:

- Piano, String Instruments, Chamber Music Ensembles and Conducting (1982);
- Choirmaster Postgraduate (1984);
- Departments of Music Theory, Composition and Foreign Languages Study (1987);
- Postgraduate School of Vocals(1989);
- Laboratory of Musical Culture of Pomerania and Kujawy (1990);
- Chair of Wind Instruments (1991);
- University publishing house (1992);
- Pedagogical Studies (1994);
- Instrumental Studies Postgraduate (1999);
- Laboratory of Church Music (2003);
- Vocal Studies Postgraduate (2004);
- Interdisciplinary Department of Jazz and Popular Music (2008).

In 1983, a building dedicated to educational purposes and student accommodation has been acquired, located at Staszica street 7, near Kołłątaja street. In 1989, upon the launch of the new concert hall, university authorities renewed a majority of the musical equipment: Steinway & Sons grand pianos, chordophones, pipe organs, wind instruments, percussion instruments. In 1996, the school obtained full autonomy, including the acquisition of the rights to carry out doctoral curricula in the field of Arts.

From 1974 to 1999, a total of 1127 students have graduated from the academy. Between 2002 and 2009, the number of university teachers increased from 120 to 150, including 55 professors, and the number of students increased to 552 from 2002 to 2015.

In 2007, the academy received the historic building of the Pomeranian Arts House, originally built in 1887 and previously run by the Opera Nova Bydgoszcz. After a series of revitalization works, including a 2009 European investment projects fund, the modernization of the facility has been carried out to fit the premises to teaching purposes, consisting of the restoration of the concert hall and the 19th century facade.

The strategic objective set by the board of the Academy of Music is to increase the number of professors, as well as the capacity to deliver doctoral degrees, so as to give a more important dimension to the university.

In 2019, city authorities launched a project to erect a new building Music Academy, at Chodkiewicza street 9–11.

== Curricula ==
Bydgoszcz Academy of Music consists of four faculties, teaching the following musical fields:

- Animators for musical activities;
- Symphony orchestra and choir conducting;
- Training music teachers and sound directors.

The curriculum consists of First degree programmes leading to a Licentiate diploma and second cycle studies, awarding the Master's degree of Arts.

In 2008, a PhD programme has been created in the Faculty of Instruments, in addition to postgraduate in one of the four faculties. Since 2010, the academy can award the degree of Doctor and Doctor habilitatus in musical instrument and conducting.

Under bilateral agreements, the Academy regularly works with foreign schools, such as:

- France (University of Toulouse-Jean Jaurès);
- Italy (Rovigo Conservatory, Reggio Emilia Conservatory, Conservatorio Luigi Cherubini);
- Latvia (Jazeps Vitols Latvian Academy of Music);
- Slovakia (Banská Bystrica Academy of Arts, Academy of Performing Arts in Bratislava);
- Belgium (Lemmensinstituut);
- Austria (Anton Bruckner Private University for Music, Drama, and Dance);
- Netherlands (Zuyd University of Applied Sciences);
- Ireland (Royal Irish Academy of Music);
- Lithuania (Lithuanian Academy of Music and Theatre);
- Germany (Rostock University of Music and Theatre, Hochschule für Musik und Theater Hamburg, Hochschule für Musik Detmold);
- Scotland (Royal Conservatoire of Scotland).

Feliks Nowowiejski Academy of Music is also a regular beneficiary of the Erasmus Programme.

== Departments and structure ==
The school is divided into four faculties:

- Faculty of Instrumental Music;
- Faculty of Composition, Theory of Music and Sound Engineering;
- Faculty of Vocal Music and Drama;
- Faculty of Conducting, Jazz Music and Music Education.

It also developed cross-departments programmes in:

- Pedagogy;
- Foreign Languages;
- Early Music;
- Contemporary Music;
- Jazz and Popular Music;
- Piano Chamber Music
- Recording Studio and Music library.

== Academy facilities ==
All buildings are located in Bydgoszcz downtown, within the so-called Music District of Bydgoszcz (Polish: Dzielnica muzyczna w Bydgoszczy).

=== Main building ===
The Academy moved into its main headquarters in 1975, located at Slowackiego street 7. Together with Pomeranian Philharmonic and the building of the Music Schools Group, they form a network surrounding the Jan Kochanowski Park where a gallery of sculptures related to composers and virtuosos is displayed.

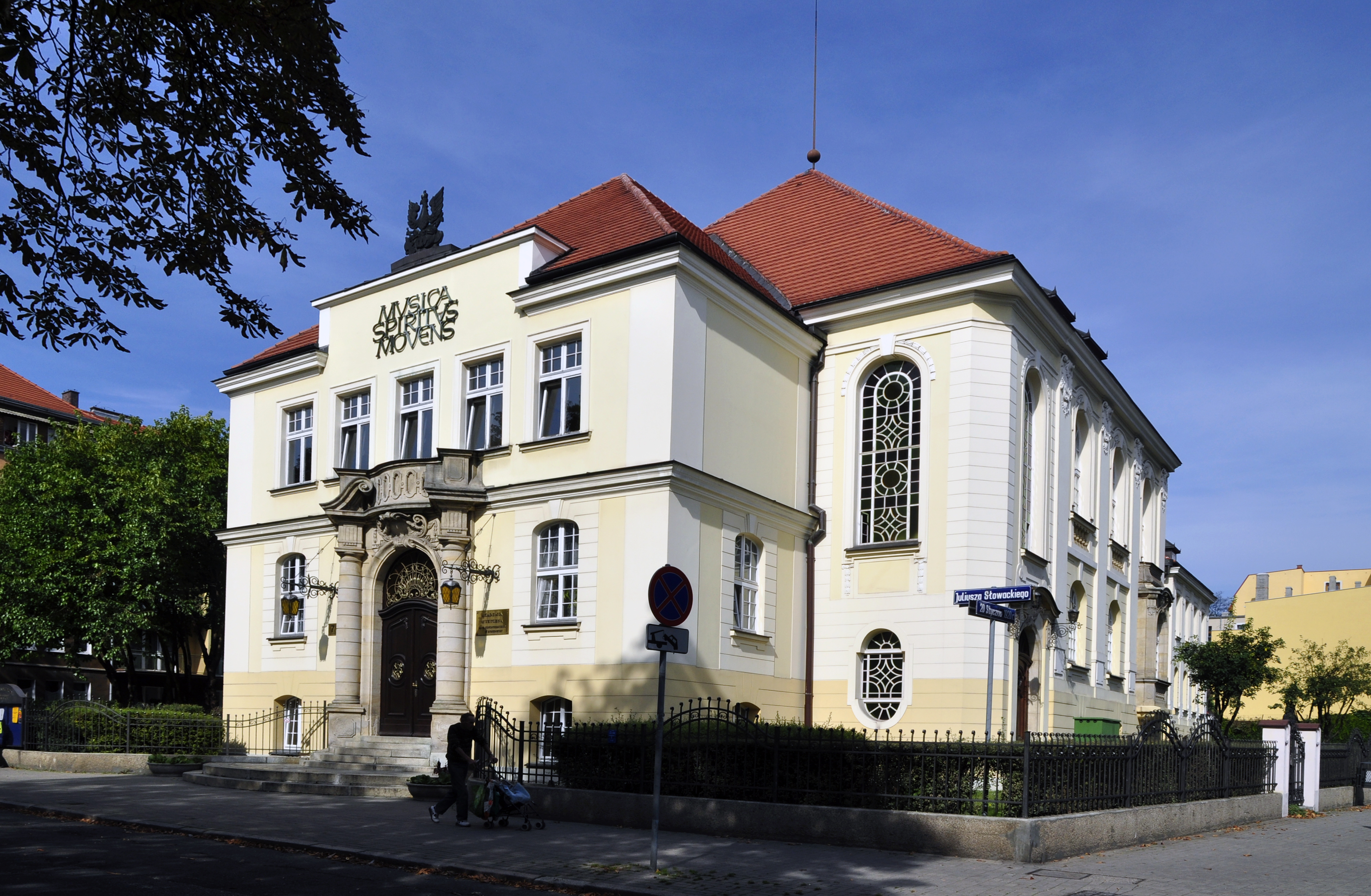
Main entry with its avant-corps

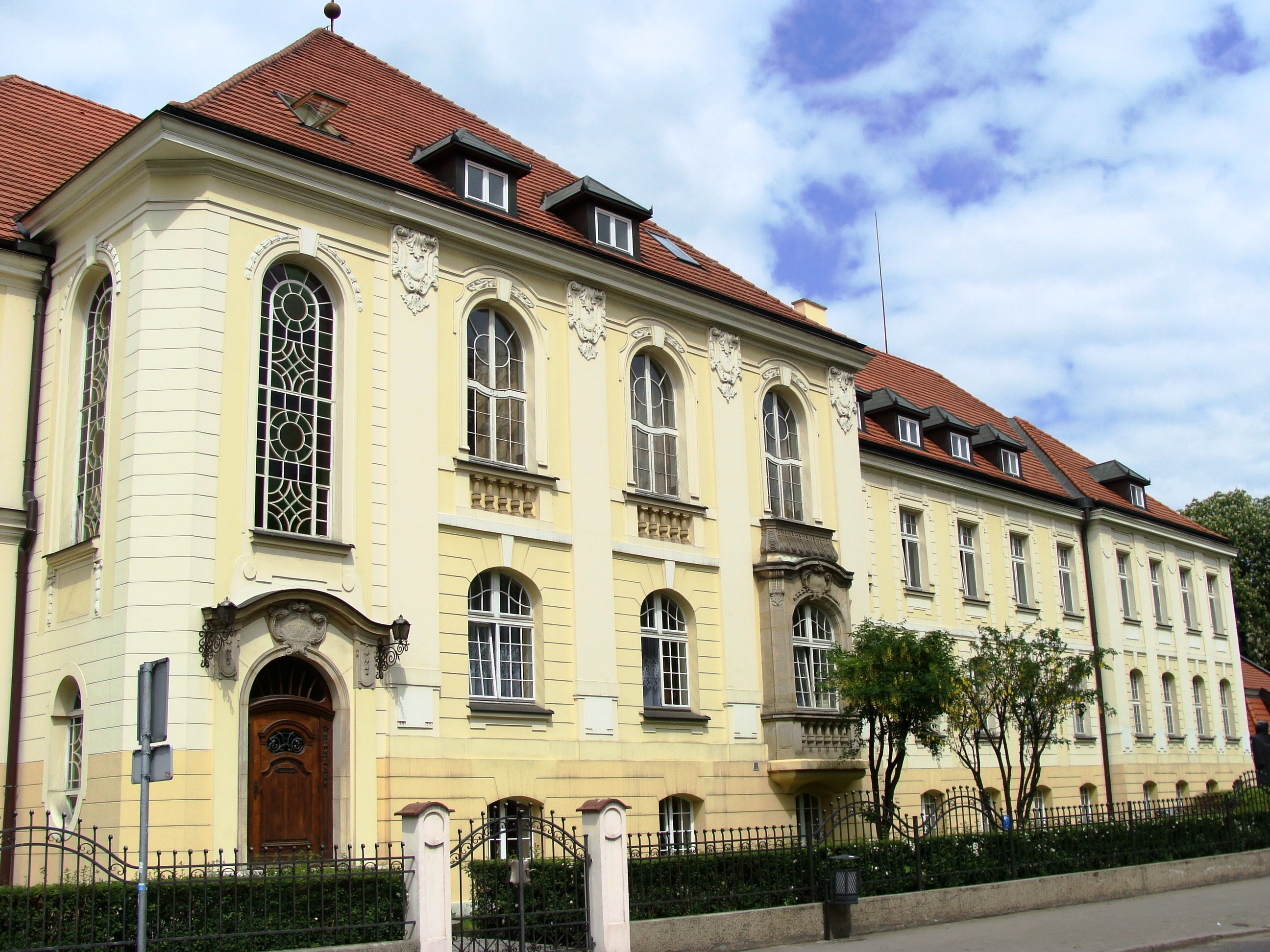
Eastern facade

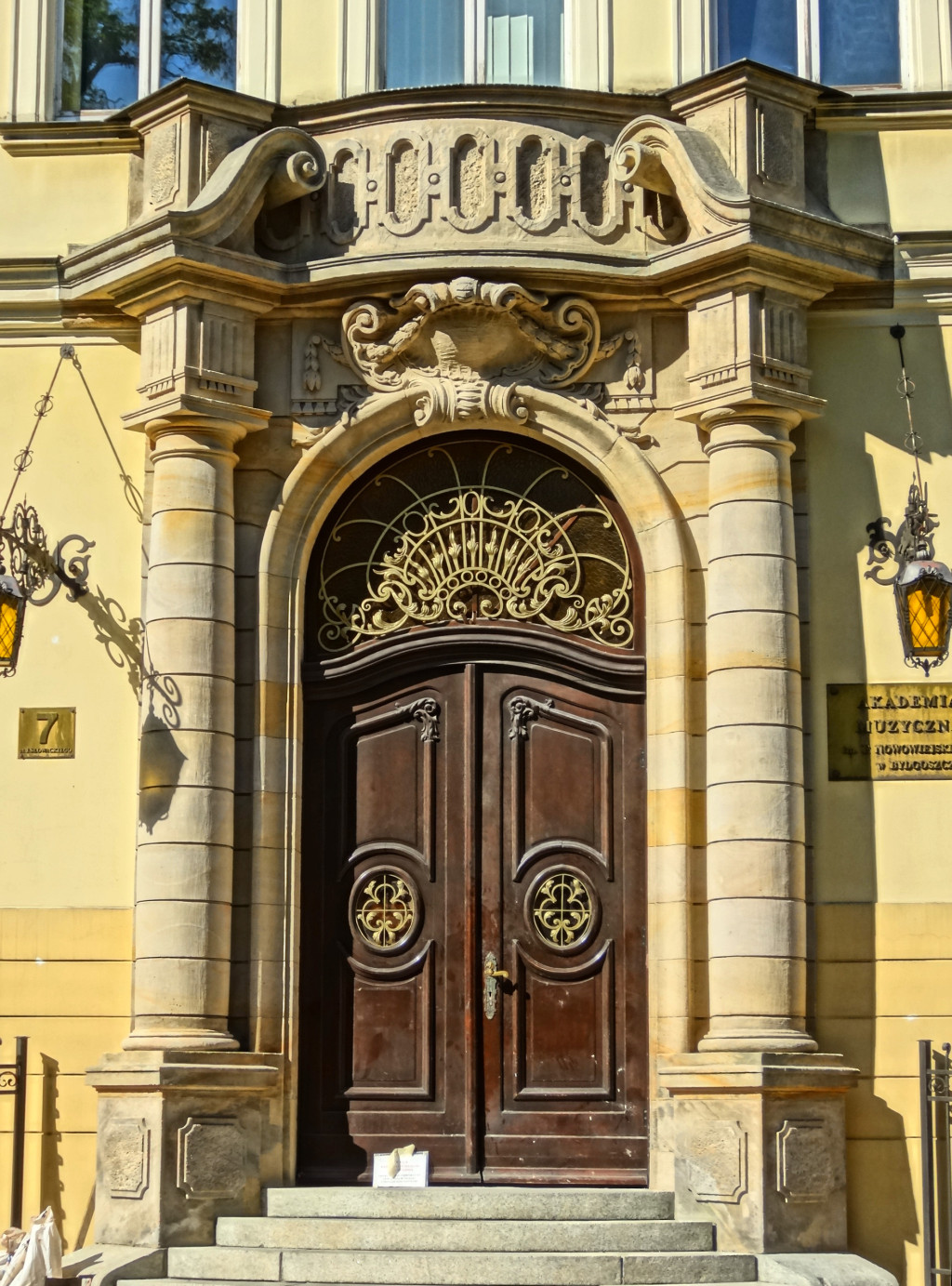
Detail of the portal

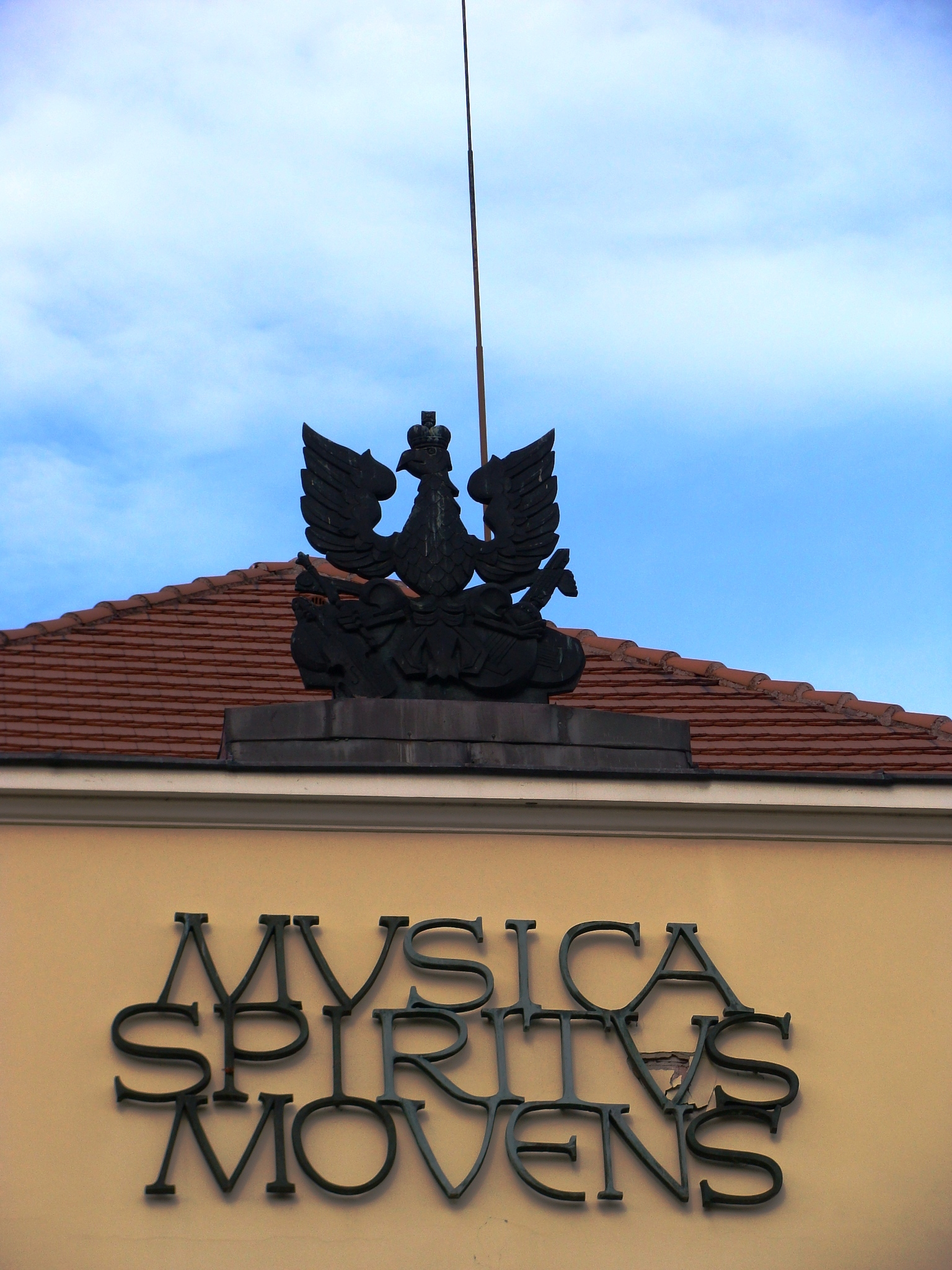
Motto and Polish Eagle

=== Other places ===
A total of 90 dormitory spots are offered to students, divided between several buildings. One is located at Staszica street 3 and Staszica street 7 (at the corner with Kołłątaja street). The other tenement stands nearby the Pomeranian Philharmonic building at Szwalbego Street 4.

Other teaching facilities include a tenement at Warminskiego Street 13 and the Pomeranian Arts House at Gdańska Street 20.

Altogether, these buildings offer a total capacity of:

- 14 rooms for collective lectures;
- 42 rooms for individual lessons;
- a pipe organ practice hall;
- a music library;
- an auditorium with 100 seats (at Staszica street 3);
- a concert hall for 140 seats in the main building of the academy.

A project for the construction of a new Music Academy building complex is currently on the way, purpose of which is to gather all scattered facilities in one area. An architectural tender is to pick out the best project to be erected by 2020 on an abandoned green areas between Kamienna, Chodkiewicza and Gdańska.

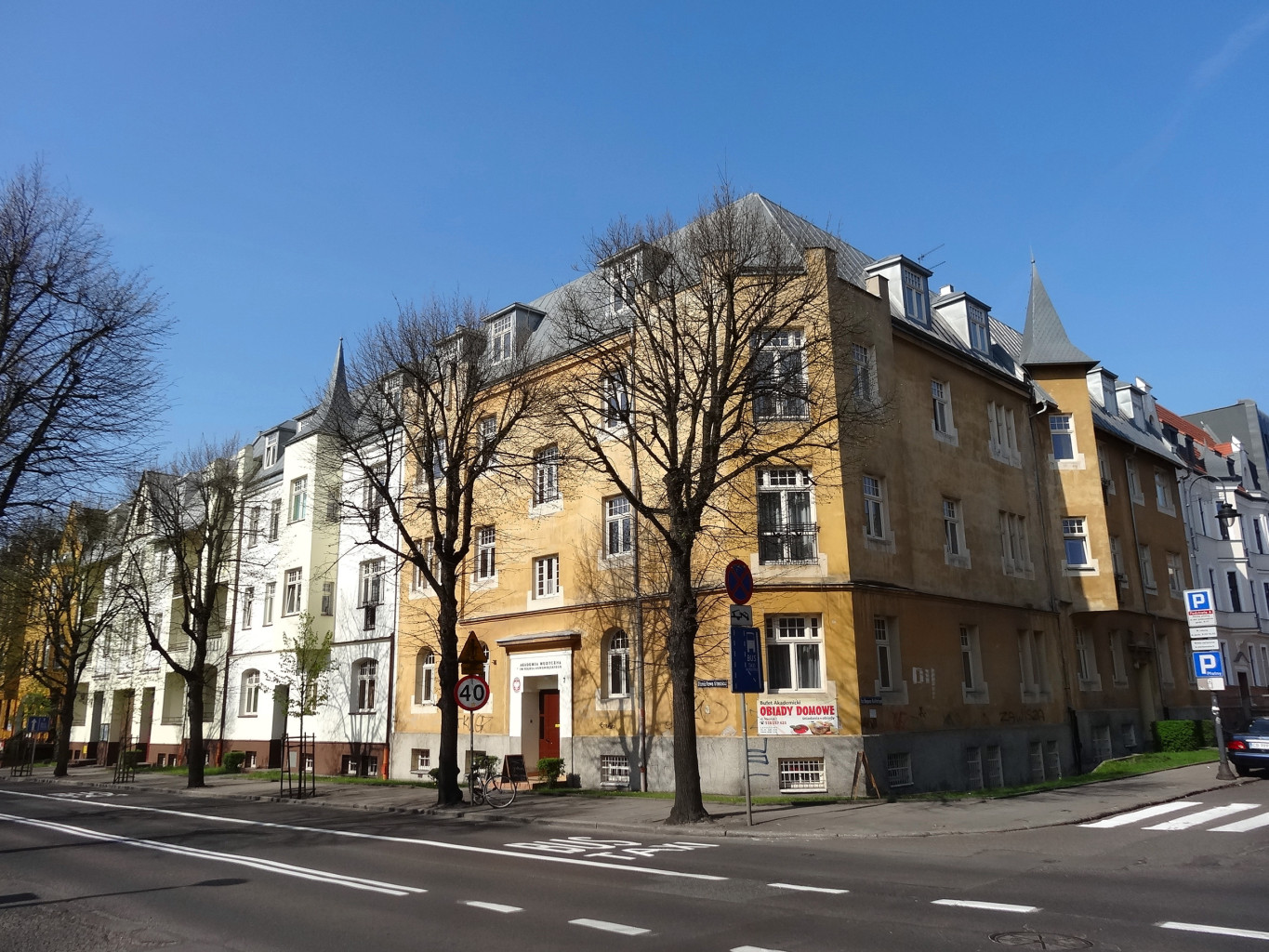
Building at Staszica street 7

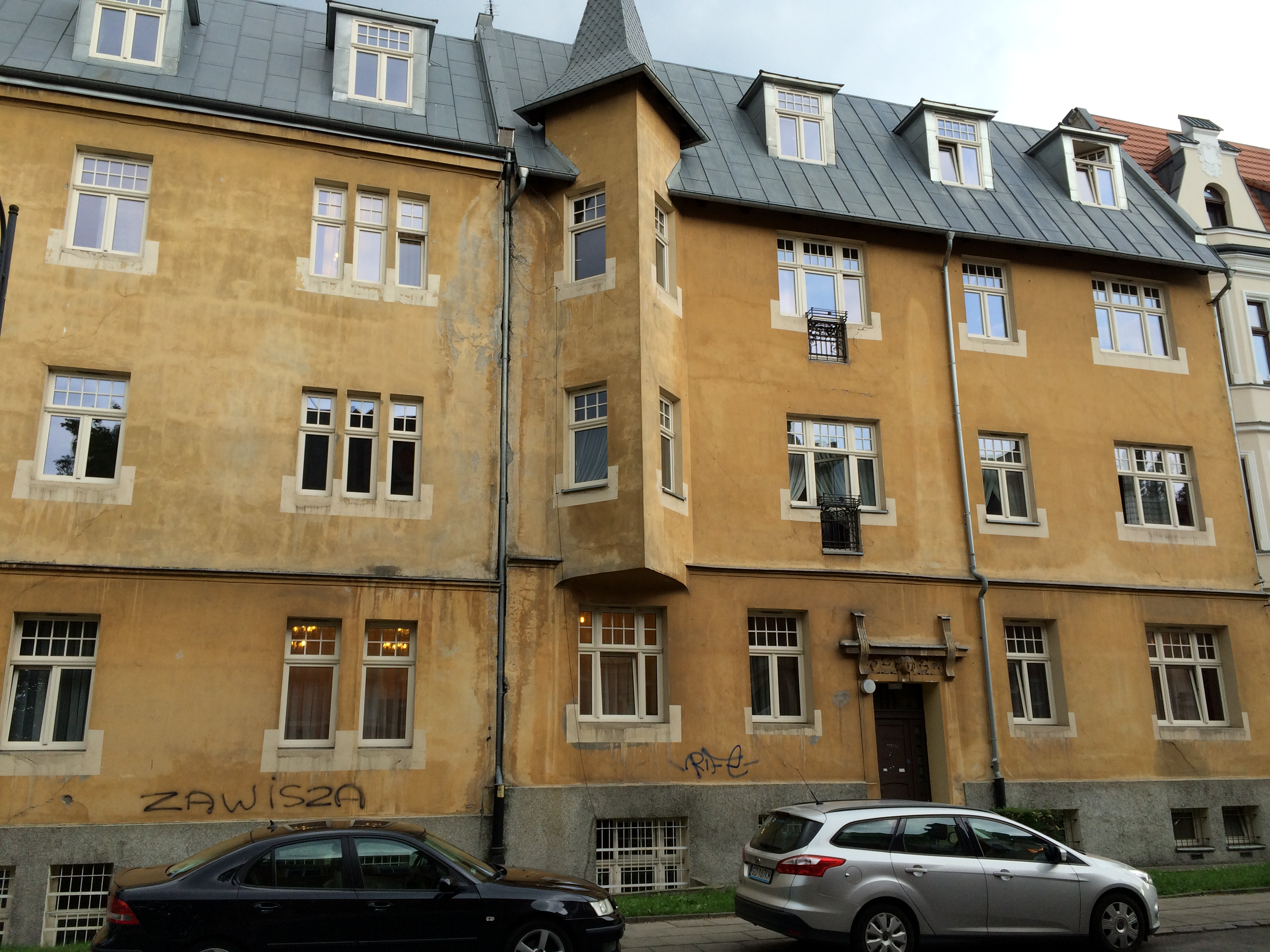
Building at Staszica street 7

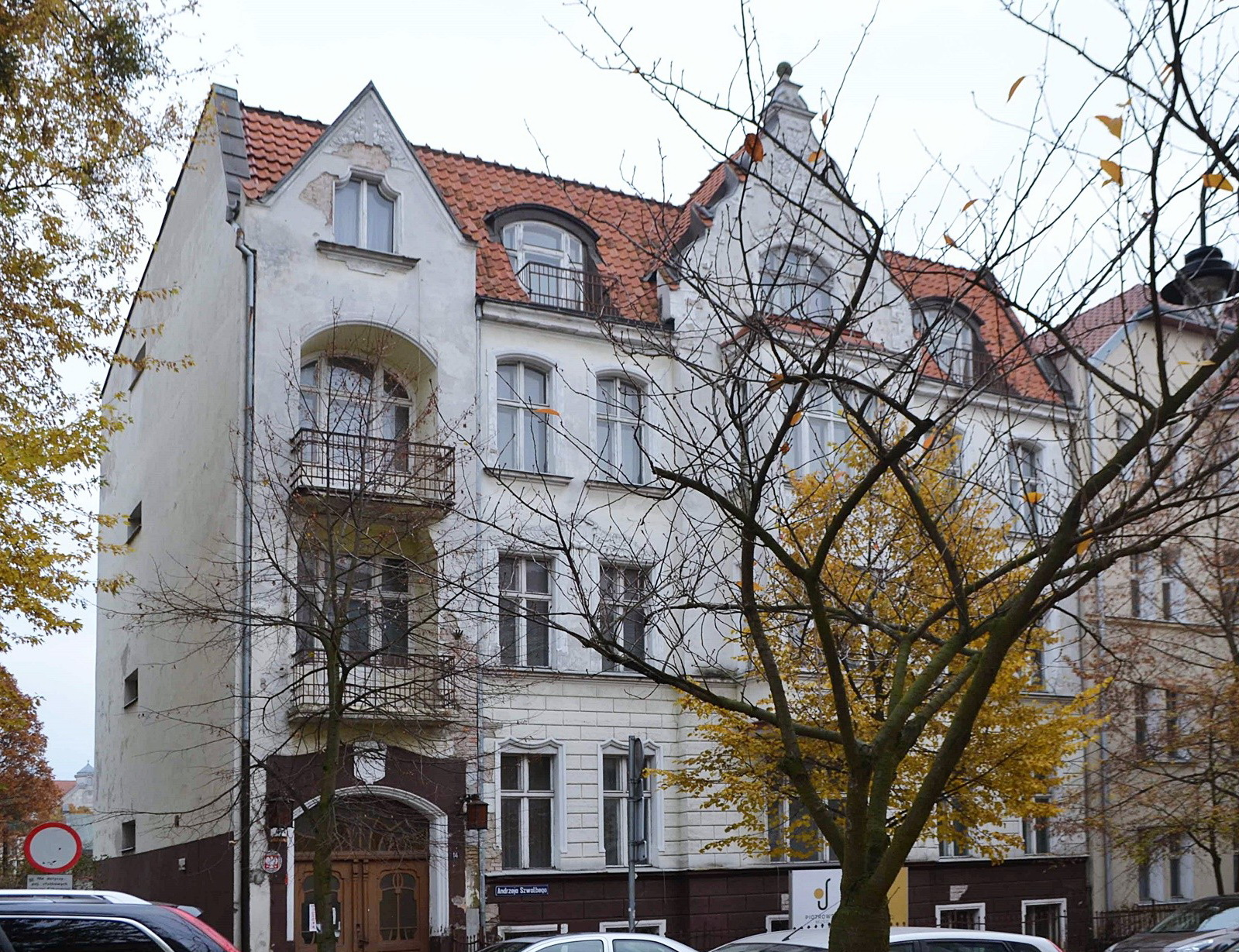
Building at Szwalbego street 4

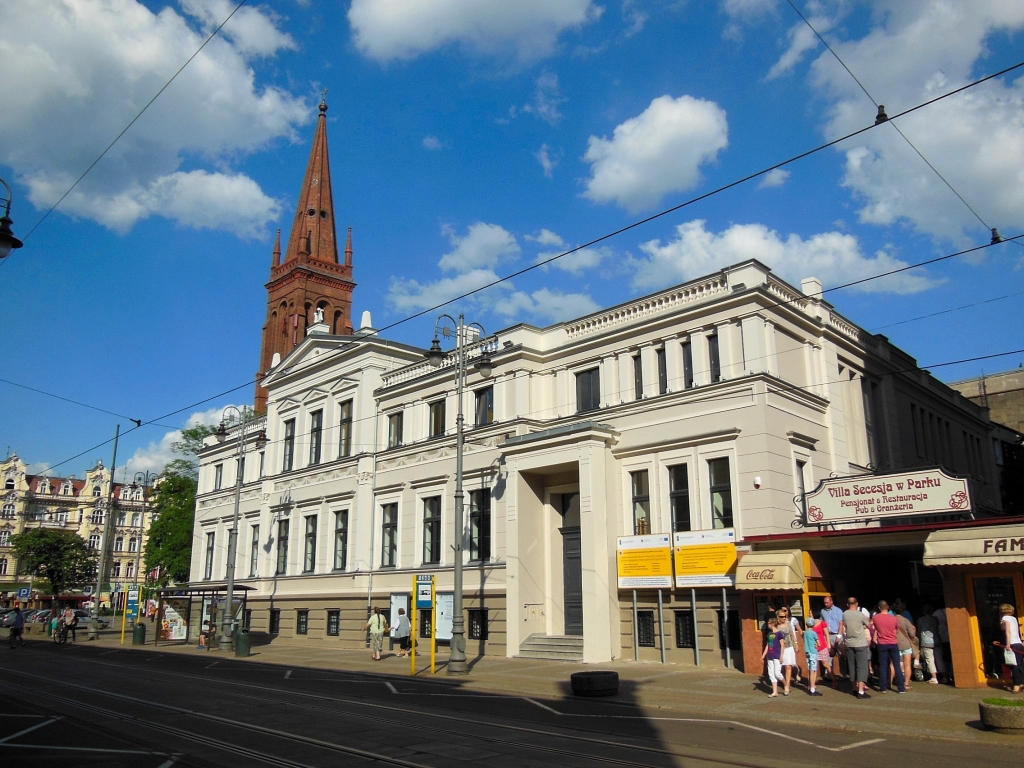
Pomeranian Arts House at Gdańska Street 20

== Artistic activities ==
In addition to teaching and research activities, the Music Academy conducts a large-scale artistic activity, famous through the whole Kujawy-Pomerania.

The university houses:

- two choirs (one Academic, one chamber music choir);
- an academic Symphonic Orchestra (est. 1976);
- an ensemble of ancient music;
- numerous ensemble for chamber music and for soloists.

Regularly, concerts are organized or co-organized by the academy where ensembles attend recurrent regional events.

Concerts and opera performances of university students, teachers and guests are regularly held at both university stages. Some of them are regular events listed in Bydgoszcz calendar of cultural events, such as:

- Bydgoskie Tuesdays Music – (Polish: Bydgoskie Wtorki Muzyczne, since 1981). Held once a month in the Concert Hall of the university;
- Pipe organ Thursdays – (Polish: Czwartki Organowe, since 1992). Held every other month in the Concert Hall of the academy;
- Musical Mornings – (Polish: Poranki Muzyczne, since 1994). A monthly cycle for children;
- Palace Concerts, organized every month in Lubostron Palace;
- Academic Concerts (since 2002). Held every other month in Ostromecko Palace and co-organized by Bydgoszcz Municipal Cultural Centre;
- Student Workshop Opera;
- Great Cycles – (Polish: Wielkie Cykle);
- The Music Academy in City Monuments.

Student ensemble or soloists attend festivals and music competitions, at regional, national and international levels, such as:

- Ignacy Paderewski International Piano Competition;
- Festival of Music Competition Laureates (since 1994);
- International Choral Meetings "Arti et Amicitiae" (1994–1998);
- Forte Piano, student festival (1994–1999);
- Jerzy Popieluszko Festival of Young Organists and Vocalists held since 1996 at the Church of the Holy Trinity in Bydgoszcz;
- Paderewski Singing Competition (since 1999);
- Organ Evenings, held since 2001 at the Saint Andrew Bobola's Church in Bydgoszcz.

The cultural activity of the academy ranks third in the musical institution production of the city, after Opera Nova and the Pomeranian Philharmonic.

== Research ==
Primary field of research is science of music, including theory, history of music, history of performances and practice, and local music culture.

Scientific research is mostly carried out during regularly organized sessions and academic conferences, but also through individual studies and team projects. Between 1980 and 2004 the Academy of Music has organized 31 conferences with topics related mainly to classical music and traditional music of Kujawy and Pomerania.

The results of the research are published in monographs issued by the academy and publications of other academic centers from Poland and abroad. In particular, one can notice the work concerning musical life of Kujawy and Pomerania, as well as a series of musical scores called "Composers scores of Bydgoszcz".

=== Pomerania and Kujawy Workshop of Musical Culture ===
Since 1990, the Laboratory Research of the university focuses on regional themes. It involves collecting and documenting data regarding musical culture in Kujawy and Pomerania and setting-up of scientific sessions devoted to this subject.

Their product is reflected in an annual scientific journal, representing an overview of musical life in different periods, from the Old Polish days to contemporary times.

== Notable persona ==
=== List of rectors ===
- 1975–1979, Dr. Miroslaw Pietkiewicz, director of Academy of Music in Łódź, vice-rector of Bydgoszcz Branch from October 1977;
- 1979–1980, professor Zenon Ploszaj, violinist;
- 1980–1987, Dr. Roman Suchecki, cellist;
- 1987–1993, professor Franciszek Wozniak, composer and pianist;
- 1993–1999, professor Dr. Antoni Poszowski, music theorist;
- 1999–2005, professor Jerzy Kaszuba, accordionist;
- 2005–2012, professor Maria Murawska, pianist;
- 2012–2020, professor Jerzy Kaszuba, accordionist;
- Since 200, professor Elżbieta Wtorkowska, music director.

=== Honoris Causa ===
- professor Jerzy Godziszewski, pianist, on 27 November 2007;
- Đặng Thái Sơn, pianist, on 27 April 2010;
- professor Mieczysław Tomaszewski, musicologist, on 28 May 2010.

=== Notable alumni ===
Notable students and alumni of the Academy include:

- Rafał Blechacz, winner of the 15th International Chopin Piano Competition (2005);
- Paweł Wakarecy, finalist of the 16th International Chopin Piano Competition (2006), also the only Pole at this stage;
- Dawid Jung, opera singer (tenor), director of the Museum of Polish Electronic Organs;
- Krzysztof Herdzin, pianist, composer, arranger, conductor, record producer, multi-instrumentalist (piano, double bass, violin), winner of several national and international music competitions.

== Bibliography ==
- Bednarski, Henryk (1988). Szkolnictwo wyzsze i srodowisko naukowe. Bydgoszcz wczoraj i dzis 1945–1980 (in Polish). Warszawa-Poznań: Bydgoskie Towarzystwo Naukowe. Panstwowe Wydawnictwo Naukowe.
- Gogol-Drozniakiewicz, Barbara (2005). Muzyczny patron. Kalendarz Bydgoski (in Polish). Bydgoszcz: Towarzystwo Miłosnikow Miasta Bydgoszczy.
- Weber, Alicja (2010). Magnificencja professor Maria. Kalendarz Bydgoski (in Polish). Bydgoszcz: Towarzystwo Miłosnikow Miasta Bydgoszczy.
- Weber, Alicja (1996). Szkola muzyków. Kalendarz Bydgoski (in Polish). Bydgoszcz: Towarzystwo Miłosnikow Miasta Bydgoszczy. pp. 270–272.
- Romeyko-Baciarelli, Krystyna (2004). Miasto studentów. Kalendarz Bydgoski (in Polish). Bydgoszcz: Towarzystwo Miłosnikow Miasta Bydgoszczy.
- Lukaszek, Ewa (1982). Panstwowa Wyzsza Szkola Muzyczna im. Feliksa Nowowiejskiego. Kalendarz Bydgoski (in Polish). Bydgoszcz: Towarzystwo Miłosnikow Miasta Bydgoszczy. pp. 22–26.
- Janiszewska-Micer, Barbara (1983). Od szkólki parafialnej do Akademii Muzycznej. Kalendarz Bydgoski (in Polish). Bydgoszcz: Towarzystwo Miłosnikow Miasta Bydgoszczy. pp. 101–104.
- Mackiewicz, Zygmunt (2004). Historia szkolnictwa wyzszego w Bydgoszczy (in Polish). Bydgoszcz: Bydgoskie Towarzystwo Naukowe. ISBN 8391732274.
- Kwasniewska Krystyna, Rak Mieczyslaw (1997). Naukowcy Bydgoszczy – slownik biograficzny 1997 (in Polish). Bydgoszcz: Instytut Wydawniczy „Swiadectwo". ISBN 8385860487.
- Nowak, Anna (2000). Akademia Muzyczna im. Feliksa Nowowiejskiego. Kalendarz Bydgoski (in Polish). Bydgoszcz: Towarzystwo Miłosnikow Miasta Bydgoszczy. pp. 151–156.
- Pruss Zdzislaw, Weber Alicja, Kuczma Rajmund (2004). Bydgoski leksykon muzyczny (in Polish). Bydgoszcz: Kujawsko-Pomorskie Towarzystwo Kulturalne.
