= Neithard Resa =

German violist (born 1950)

Neithard Resa (born 1 September 1950) is a German violist and former member of the Berlin Philharmonic.

== Life ==
Resa was born in Berlin as the son of a merchant and started playing the violin at the age of seven. He studied violin at the Musikhochschule Berlin in 1969, first with Michel Schwalbé, from 1971 privately with Marie-Luise von Kleist König and in 1972 with Max Rostal. In 1975, he changed to viola. In the 1970s, he worked together with the Sinfonieorchester Aachen via the Deutscher Musikrat and became a member of the Boerries Quartet. In 1976, he passed his final artistic examination and in 1977, his concert examination at the Hochschule für Musik und Tanz Köln. In 1977, he went to the USA on a scholarship from the German Academic Exchange Service, where he was taught in Philadelphia by the violist Michael Tree of the Guarneri String Quartet.

As successor to Giusto Cappone, Resa became principal viola with the Berliner Philharmoniker from 24 August 1978 to 2010, where he remained until his retirement. In addition to orchestral playing, he is particularly committed to chamber music. From 1980 to 1987, he played octet in the Philharmonic, since 1985 he has been a founding member and violist together with his orchestra colleagues Daniel Stabrawa (first violin), Christian Stadelmann (second violin) and Jan Diesselhorst (cello) in the Philharmonia Quartet Berlin. From 1985 to 1997, Resa taught in the Karajan Academy. He performed as a soloist under conductors such as Bernard Haitink, Daniel Barenboim and Zubin Mehta.

On 24 June 2017, he was retired by Simon Rattle, the chief conductor of the Berlin Philharmonic.
