= Jan Diesselhorst =

German cellist (1954–2009)

Jan Diesselhorst (18 March 1954 – 5 February 2009) was a German cellist.

== Life ==
Born in Marburg, Diesselhorst, a grandson of the Protestant theologian Rudolf Bultmann and son of Gesine Bultmann and her husband, the Göttingen legal philosopher Malte Diesselhorst, grew up in Göttingen in a music-loving family. He studied cello playing first with Alexander Molzahn in Frankfurt and then with Wolfgang Boettcher in Berlin. After receiving several awards, he passed the audition for the Berlin Philharmonic in 1977, in which he had previously worked on a temporary basis. In 1985, he and his three orchestra colleagues Daniel Stabrawa, Daniel Stabrawa (first violin), Christian Stadelmann (second violin) and Neithard Resa (viola) founded the Philharmonia Quartet Berlin. The ensemble received the Preis der deutschen Schallplattenkritik for its Britten and Regerrecordings ". Furthermore, since his recording with the Berlin Philharmonic he has also belonged to the ensemble The 12 Cellists of the Berlin Philharmonic and has taught at the Karajan-Akademie since 1990. With the Berlin Philharmonic Orchestra, one of whose "prominent figures in the front row" was Diesselhorst, he also served on the Council of Five since 2003 and on the orchestra's board of directors since 2005, as well as being deputy chairman of the foundation.

Diesselhorst was married to the pianist Gesine Tiefuhr-Diesselhorst. He died of cardiac arrest at the age of 54 after a six-hour heart valve operation. On the occasion of the first anniversary of his death, the Philharmonia Quartet Berlin, the 12 Cellists of the Berlin Philharmonic Orchestra and the Orchestra Academy of the Berlin Philharmonic Orchestra organised a memorial concert in his honour on Sunday, 7 February 2010 in the Chamber Music Hall of the Berlin Philharmonic.

Brett Dean dedicated the third movement of his "Epitaph for string quintet (viola quintet) (2010)" in memory of Jan Diesselhorst.
