= Anna Gebert =

Polish-born Finnish musician (born 1979)

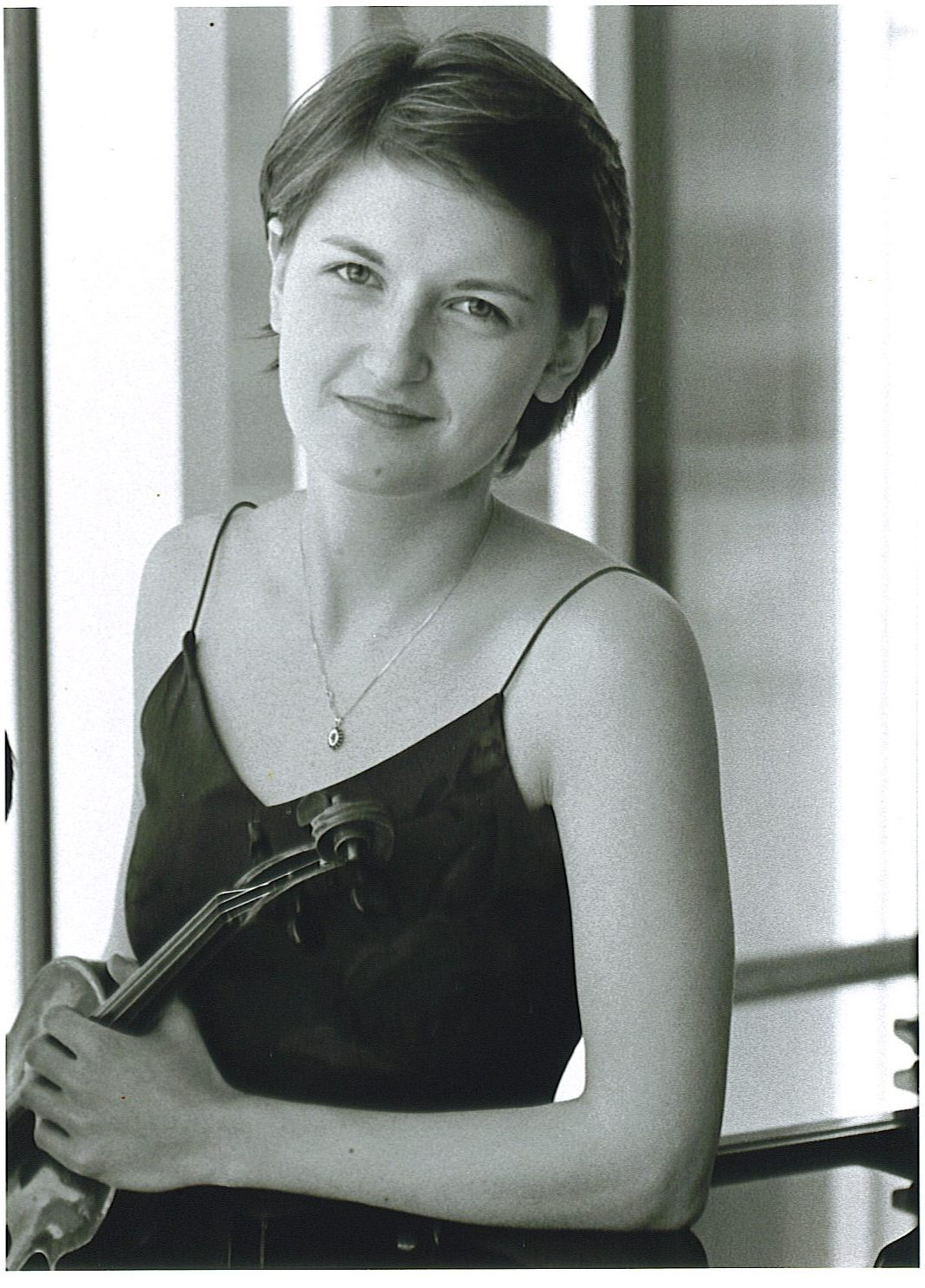
- Anna Gebert
- Born: 1979; Warsaw, Poland
- Occupation: violinist

Anna Gebert (born 1979 in Warsaw, Poland) is a Polish-born Finnish violinist. She is currently professor of violin at the University of Arts in Zürich ZHdK and professor of chamber music at the Music Academy in Basel, Switzerland.

From August 2007, she was Assistant Concertmaster of the Cologne Philharmonic Gürzenich Orchestra, and 2011-2018 the First Concertmaster of the Trondheim Symphony Orchestra.

Gebert was an artist faculty at the Kuhmo Chamber Music Festival since 2000, and was 2011-2020 faculty at the NTNU Norwegian University of Science and Technology in Trondheim. From Autumn 2020 she has been appointed professor of Violin at the Zürich Hochschule der Künste and from autumn 2021 professor of Chamber Music at Musik Akademie Basel. Festival performances include Ravinia Festival Steans Institute, Prussia Cove, Sarasota, Holland Music Sessions, Staunton Music Festival, Trondheim Kamfest and Barokkfest among others. Her chamber music partners have included Yefim Bronfman, Gilbert Kalish, Ik-Wan Bae, Miriam Fried, Ana Chumachenco, Guy Braunstein, David Cohen, Paul Biss, Thomas Riebl, and Svetlin Roussev.

She was a member of the Gustav Mahler Youth Orchestra and the European Union Youth Orchestra 1994–1997 and Mahler Chamber Orchestra 1997–2000. She performed substitute work on several occasions including:

- Assistant concertmaster NDR Radiophilharmonie in Hannover, Museumsorchester Frankfurt, Dortmunder Philharmoniker, Staatsphilharmonie Rheinland-Pfalz, MusikFabrik, Stockholm Royal Philharmonic Orchestra, Stavanger Symphony Orchestra, HR-Sinfonieorchester Frankfurt, Stockholm Philharmonic Orchestra
- First concertmaster WDR Rundfunkorchester, Helsinki Philharmonic Orchestra, Stockholm Opera, Odense Symphony Orchestra,
- 3rd chair 1st violin of the London Symphony Orchestra
- Leader of 2nd violins in Symphonieorchester des Bayerischen Rundfunks, Mahler Chamber Orchestra and Bayerisches Staatsorchester.
- Baroque ensembles: Berliner Barocksolisten, Trondheim Barokk, Norwegian Baroque Orchestra, Barokkanerne, La Scintilla, Helsinki Baroque Orchestra

She studied with Igor Bezrodny at Helsinki Sibelius-Academy, Magdalena Rezler in Freiburg, and Ana Chumachenco in Munich. She was a Fulbright scholar (Artist Diploma) at Indiana University in Bloomington with Miriam Fried and Paul Biss, including baroque violin studies with Stanley Ritchie. Gebert was a member of the Karajan Academy under the tutelage of Guy Braunstein and Christian Stadelmann, and a full-time substitute of the Berlin Philharmonic Orchestra 2005–2007. She plays a Joseph Gagliano violin from 1796 on loan from a private collection.
