= Richard Klemm =

Richard Klemm (born 1902 in Dresden; died 1988 in Berlin) was a German cellist, composer and teacher.

== Biography ==
His father (Oskar Richard Klemm) was a versatile musician, who besides his main instrument (the double bass) played various other instruments which gained him a musical reputation through his engagements at private celebrations and events such as weddings.

As a child Richard Klemm received from his father a musical education in several instruments (the cello, piano, violin and trumpet), and he also sang in the boys' choir Dresdner Kreuzchor. In 1919 Klemm left Dresden and took up the position of cellist with the Königsberg Kurorchester. During the years 1923-1926 he studied the cello with Hugo Becker in Berlin, composition with Paul Juon, and the piano. He graduated in both musical disciplines, the cello and the piano. For his final graduation examination pieces he played the solo cello sonata by Zoltán Kodály and Beethoven's Piano Concerto No. 3.

After completing his studies Richard Klemm became a cellist with the Staatskapelle Berlin (the orchestra of the Berlin State Opera. At the same time he also played in the chamber music ensembles of the Staatskapelle Berlin as well as with the Kniestädt Quartet. In 1950 he taught himself to play the viola da gamba. In 1958 Richard Klemm was appointed professor at the West Berlin Academy of Music. Several of his pupils became cellists with the Berlin Philharmonic Orchestra (Wolfgang Boettcher, Christoph Kapler, Jörg Baumann, Alexander Wedow). Klemm's compositional work for four cellos contributed to the founding of The 12 Cellists of the Berlin Philharmonic. He also composed pieces for the viola da gamba and passed on the playing technique of this instrument to his pupils. Later, his colleague Siegfried Borris wrote for him a concerto for viola da gamba and orchestra. For many years Klemm was a member of the Richard Wagner Festival Orchestra in Bayreuth.

His best-remembered compositions are the pieces he wrote for four cellos ("Bolero", "Habanera", "España" and "Concert Waltz"). He wrote arrangements of Johann Sebastian Bach's Art of Fugue for string quartet, as well as arrangements for four cellos of the cello concertos of Joseph Haydn, Robert Schumann and Camille Saint-Saëns. In recognition of his service to music Richard Klemm was awarded a medal: the Bundesverdienstkreuz (German Service Cross with ribbon).

He was married to Ilse Ebermann and had three sons.
