= Karl Leister =

German clarinetist (born 1937)

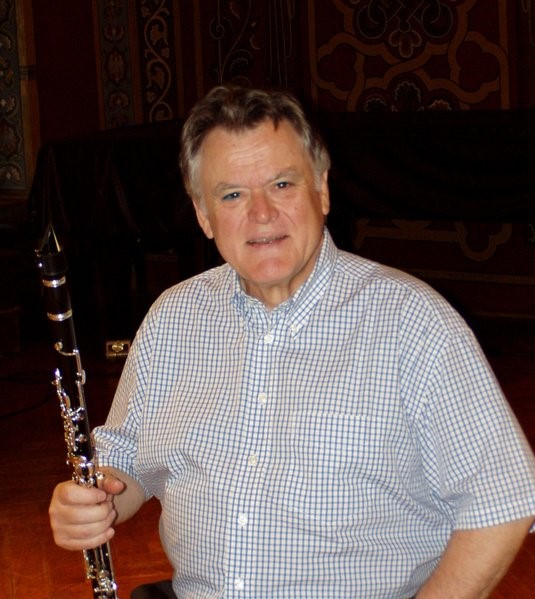

Background information
- Born: 15 June 1937 (age 89); Wilhelmshaven, Germany
- Genres: Classical
- Occupations: Musician, soloist
- Instrument: Clarinet

Karl Leister (born 15 June 1937) is a German classical clarinetist.

== Biography ==
At a very young age, he learned to play the clarinet from his father, also a clarinetist, and later studied at the Hochschule für Musik in Berlin. As a teenager, he was accepted into the Komische Oper Berlin under Václav Neumann and Walter Felsenstein as clarinet soloist.

In 1959, Leister joined the Berlin Philharmonic Orchestra under the baton of Herbert von Karajan; this musical association was to last for thirty years. During this time, he became internationally recognized as a soloist and chamber musician. He was also one of the founding members of the Bläser der Berliner Philharmoniker ("Berlin Soloists"), which made a number of recordings – including Brahms's "Clarinet Quintet in B Minor, Opus 115". Additionally, he co-founded the Ensemble Wien-Berlin.

The creation of the Herbert von Karajan Academy of the Berlin Philharmonic Orchestra has permitted Leister to teach music to a whole new generation of musicians. From 1993 to 2002, Leister held the position of Professor at the Hochschule für Musik "Hanns Eisler" in Berlin.

== Related links ==
- Karl Leister on YouTube
