= Wolfgang Boettcher =

German editor, musician, and music educator (1935–2021)

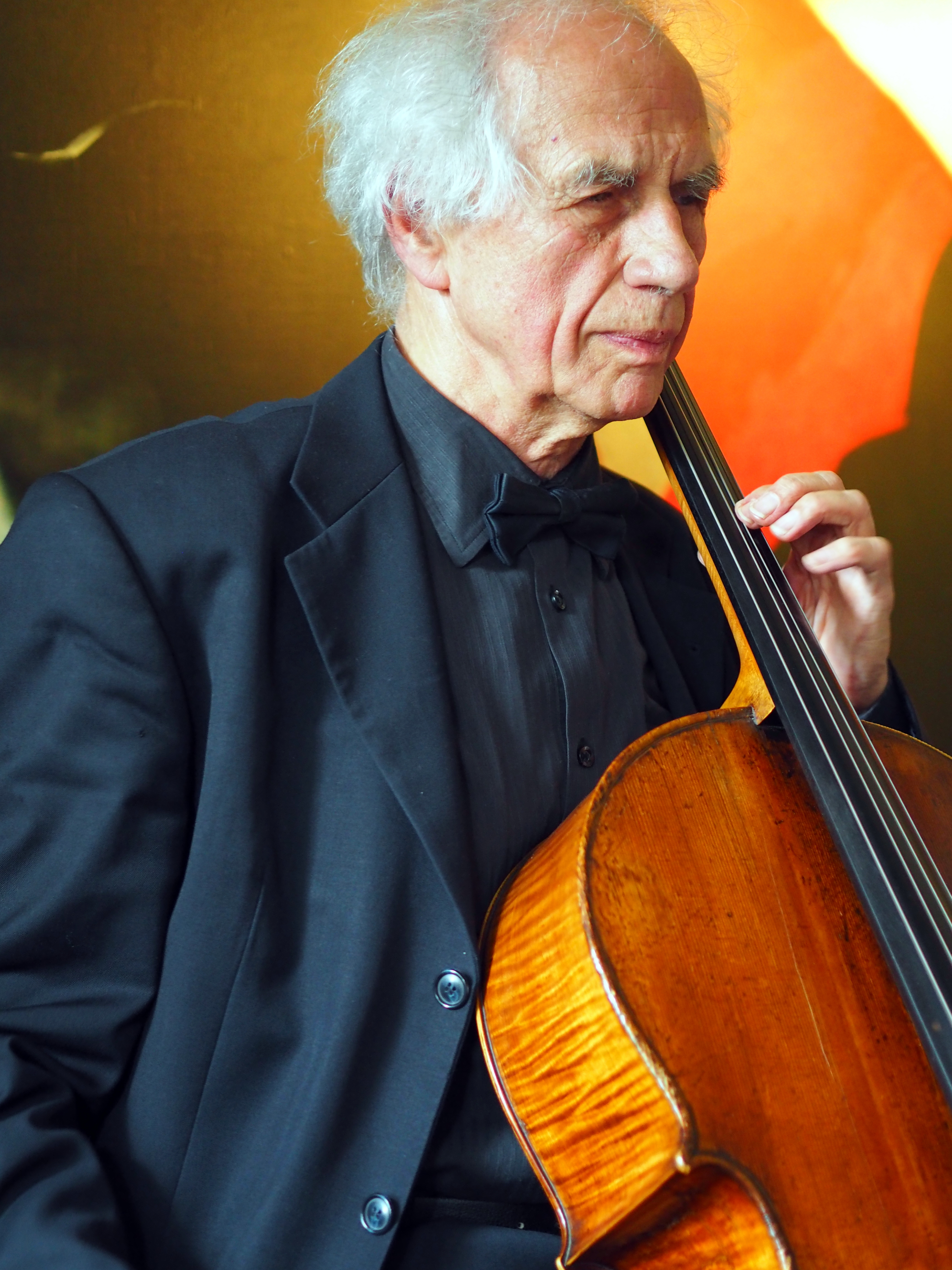
- Wolfgang Boettcher, June 2015
- Born: 30 January 1935; Berlin, Brandenburg, Prussia, Germany
- Died: 24 February 2021 (aged 86); Berlin, Berlin, Germany
- Occupations: Classical cellist; Academic teacher
- Organizations: Berlin Philharmonic; The 12 Cellists of the Berlin Philharmonic; Hochschule für Musik Berlin; Sommerliche Musiktage Hitzacker

Wolfgang Boettcher (30 January 1935 – 24 February 2021) was a German classical cellist and academic teacher. He was principal cellist of the Berlin Philharmonic, and a founding member of The 12 Cellists of the Berlin Philharmonic. From 1976, he was professor at the Hochschule für Musik Berlin. From 1986 to 1992 he was artistic director of the Sommerliche Musiktage Hitzacker chamber music festival.

== Life and career ==
Born in Berlin in 1935, Boettcher was given a cello by his mother, who had bought the instrument from the black market. He studied cello at the Hochschule für Musik Berlin with Richard Klemm. In 1958 he won second prize at the ARD International Music Competition in Munich together with his elder sister, the Mannheim pianist Ursula Trede-Boettcher. He was cellist of the Berlin Philharmonic from 1958 to 1976, becoming principal cellist in 1963. He played with conductors such as Sergiu Celibidache and Herbert von Karajan, violinist Yehudi Menuhin, and baritone Dietrich Fischer-Dieskau, performing at festivals including the Salzburg Festival and the Lockenhaus Chamber Music Festival and on concert tours to various European countries, Israel, Japan, and South America. Boettcher was a founding member of the ensemble The 12 Cellists of the Berlin Philharmonic and the Brandis Quartet.

From 1986 to 1992, Boettcher was artistic director of the Sommerliche Musiktage Hitzacker. He programmed a wide repertoire of chamber music from Medieval music to contemporary music, with a focus on composers who had been banned during the Nazi regime. In 1990, he was the soloist in the world premiere of Giselher Klebe's Cello Concerto which was composed for him, with the Philharmonic conducted by Daniel Barenboim. Composers Aribert Reimann, Hans Vogt, and others also wrote music for him. Composers such as Henri Dutilleux, György Ligeti, and Witold Lutoslawski appreciated his interpretation of their works.

In 1976, Boettcher was appointed professor at the Hochschule der Künste Berlin, now the Berlin University of the Arts, where he taught generations of cellists, including Jan Diesselhorst, who was also a member of the Philharmonic and The 12 Cellists, Wen-Sinn Yang and Dietmar Schwalke. He also taught at the Carl Flesch Akademie Baden-Baden for 22 years. He became a member of the Bayerische Akademie der Schönen Künste in 1988, and was chairman of the jury of the Grand Prix Emanuel Feuermann cello competition.

Together with his two sisters, pianist Ursula and violinist Marianne, Boettcher formed a piano trio that continued to give concerts even in his old age. He was married to Regina Vollmar, the niece of his godfather Eberhard Preußner. The couple had a son and four daughters, including the actress Anna Böttcher.

Boettcher died in Berlin on 24 February 2021 at age 86.

== Publications ==
- with Winfried Pape: Das Violoncello – Geschichte, Bau, Technik, Repertoire. Schott, Mainz 1996. 2nd revised edition 2005, ISBN 3-7957-0283-6.
