= Olaf Maninger =

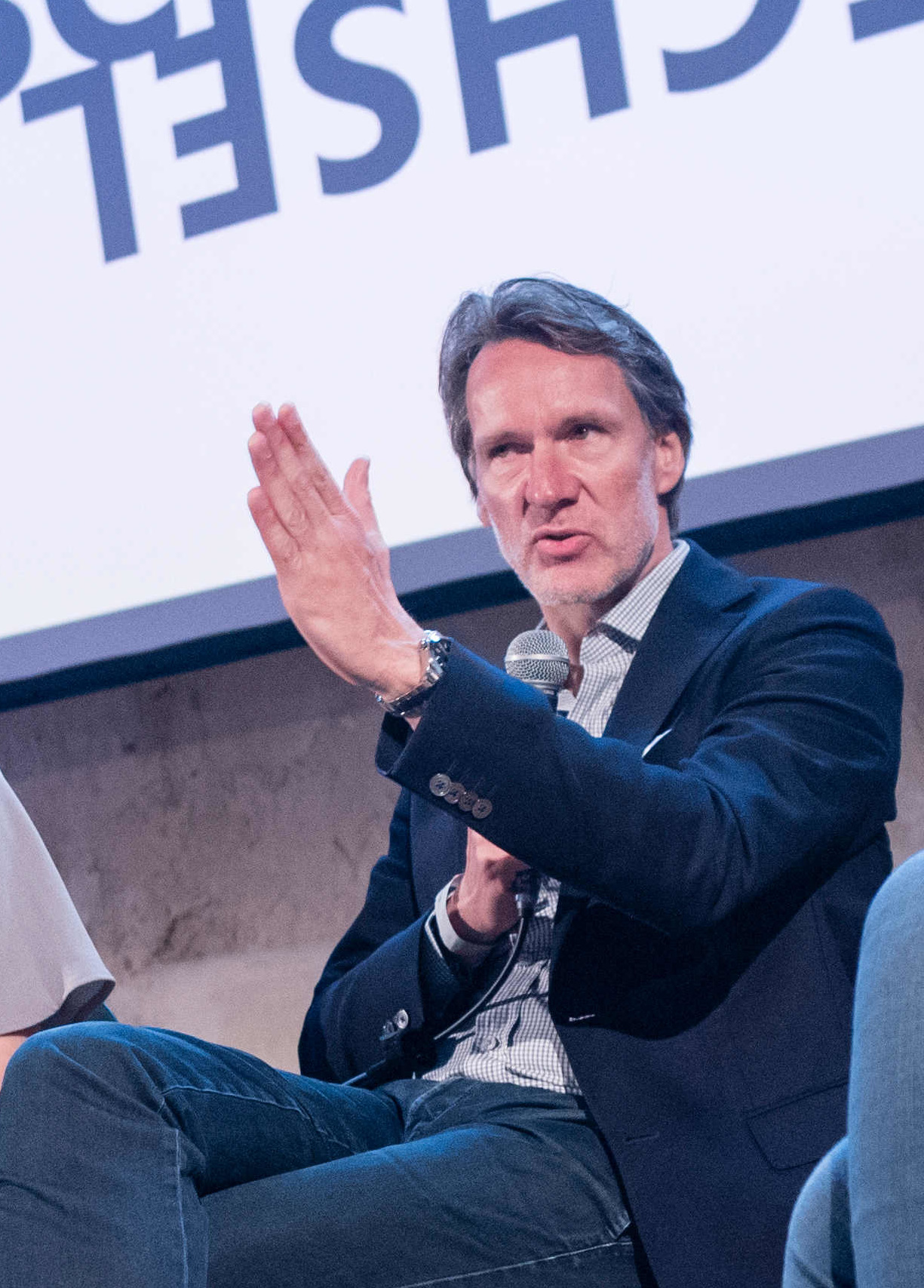

Background information
- Born: October 16, 1964 (age 60); Recklinghausen, Germany
- Genres: Classical
- Occupation(s): Classical cellist, principal cellist and managing director of the Berliner Philharmonic
- Instrument: Cello

Olaf Maninger (born 16 October 1964 in Recklinghausen) is a German cellist.

Maninger studied initially with János Starker and then continued his training with Boris Piergamienszczikow. He joined the Berlin Philharmonic in 1994, and was appointed principal cellist with the orchestra in 1996.

In the years 1997 to 2002, Maninger was managing director of the Berliner Philharmoniker GbR (society). Since the Berliner Philharmoniker Foundation was set up in 2002, he has been a member of the board. In this capacity, he played a significant role in the development of the Berliner Philharmoniker's Digital Concert Hall. He has been general manager of Berlin Phil Media GmbH since 2008. Maninger is also one of the 12 cellists of the Berlin Philharmonic.
