= Molzahn =

Molzahn is a surname. Notable people with the surname include:

- Alexander Molzahn (1907–1998), German cellist and university teacher
- Johannes Molzahn (1892–1965), German artist
- Tenley Molzahn (born 1984), American dancer and television personality
