= Capella Bydgostiensis =

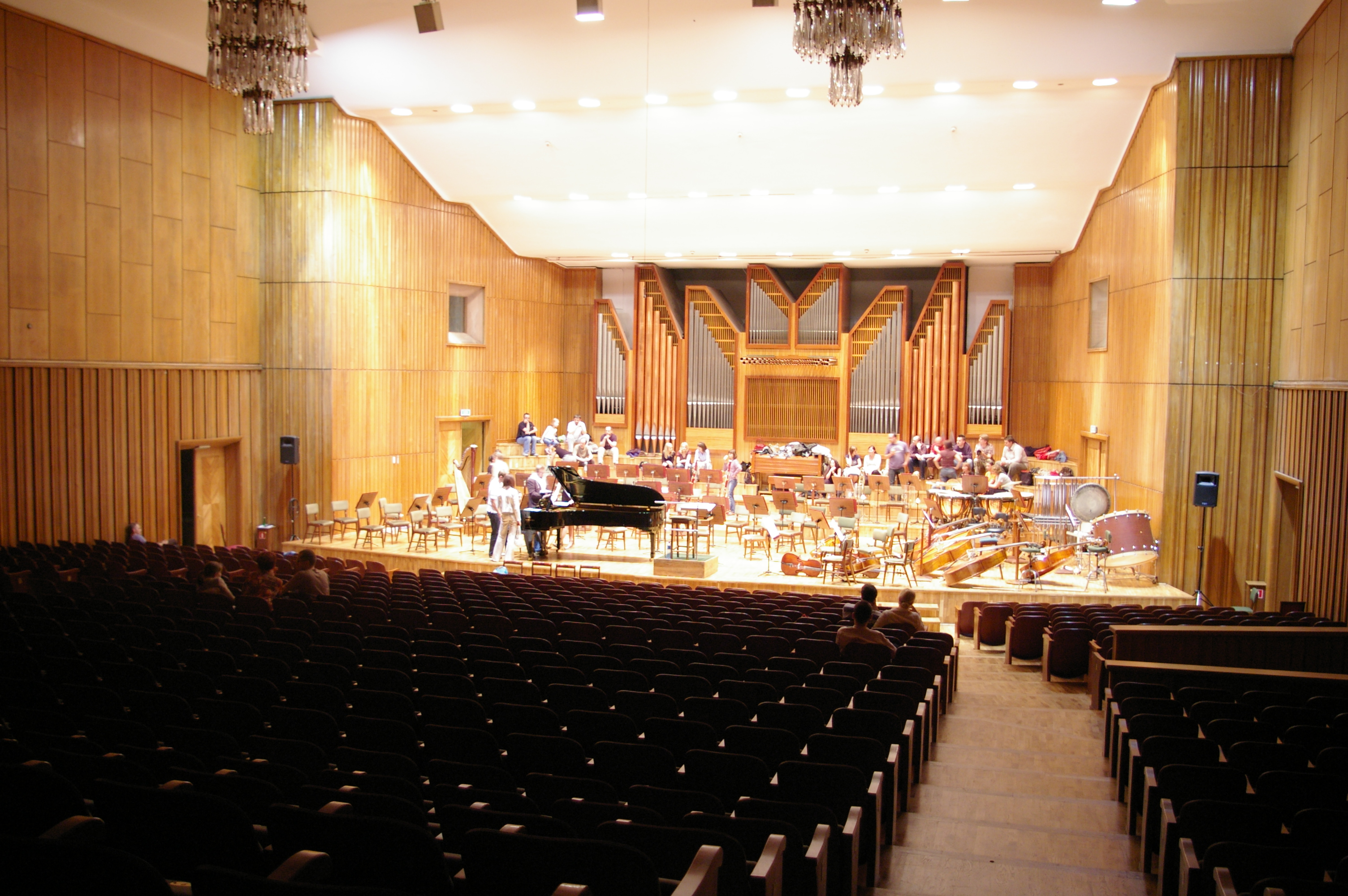

The Capella Bydgostiensis is one of the leading Polish chamber orchestras. It has been operating in Bydgoszcz, Kuyavian–Pomeranian Voivodeship, Poland since 1962.

== History ==
The predecessor of Capella Bydgostiensis was the Early Music Ensemble (1960), in which musicians from the Pomeranian Philharmonic played on original period instruments, purchased and completed by the Philharmonic's director Andrzej Szwalbe.

The idea behind the formation of the band was to promote old Polish music in the country and abroad, in the most authentic form possible.

In 1962 Andrzej Szwalbe, director of the Pomeranian Philharmonic, formed an independent musical unit and transformed it into an ensemble focused exclusively on early music, with mind to developing the group on a level comparable to renowned European chamber ensembles. Initially, it was called Capella Bydgostiensis Pro Musica Antiqua. It is still a full-time band deriving from the Pomeranian Philharmonic. The artistic direction of Capella Bydgostiensis was provided by: Stanisław Gałoński (1962–1970), Włodzimierz Szymański, Karol Teutsch, Daniel Stabrawa, José Maria Florêncio. Currently, Kai Bumann collaborates with chamber musicians as artistic director of the Pomeranian Philharmonic.

Initially, the ensemble included: the full-time Madrigal Octet, the Early Music Instrumental Ensemble and the Bydgoszcz Boys' and Men's Choir conducted by Józef Radwan. The first performance of Capella Bydgostiensis in its initial lineup took place on February 28, 1962, in the chamber hall of the Pomeranian Philharmonic. The repertoire of Capella Bydgostiensis was very diverse - from medieval music to contemporary avant-garde. The singers from the madrigalists octet performed as soloists in cantata and oratorios, or as an a cappella group in the madrigal repertoire, often also performing songs accompanied by period instruments. Each musician in the orchestra played several instruments, both ancient and modern.

== Recent years ==
The orchestra performs regularly on the most important stages in Poland and Europe, in such prestigious halls as: the National Philharmonic in Warsaw, Pyotr Tchaikovsky in Moscow, Schauspielhaus in Berlin, Schloss Mirabell in Salzburg, Royal Palace in Stockholm, El Escorial in Spain, in the hall of the Dutch Radio in Utrecht, in the Royal Castle in Warsaw, in Aula Leopoldinum in Wrocław and in the Lviv Philharmonic, where it performed at 9th International Music Festival "Virtuosos".

== Recordings ==
In recent years the ensemble has been recording actively, with releases on Dux Records and Naxos Records. On the occasion of the 60th anniversary of the Pomeranian Philharmonic celebrated in 2013, the band released two new albums the following year: Ave Maria with songs by ten composers from different eras, recorded with the outstanding soprano Barbara Kubiak, and the album of Grażyna Bacewicz's 'Symphony for String Orchestra' (Ewa Kupiec – piano, Mariusz Smolij – conductor). This CD, recorded for Naxos, received the Fryderyk award in 2015 in the category of the best Polish album abroad.

== Bibliography ==
- Łukaszek Ewa: Capella Bydgostiensis od dwudziestu lat rozsławia imię naszego miasta. [w.] Kalendarz Bydgoski 1983
- Pruss Zdzisław, Weber Alicja, Kuczma Rajmund: Bydgoski leksykon muzyczny. Kujawsko-Pomorskie Towarzystwo Kulturalne. Bydgoszcz 2004, pp. 86–87
