= Benjamin Bilse =

German conductor and composer

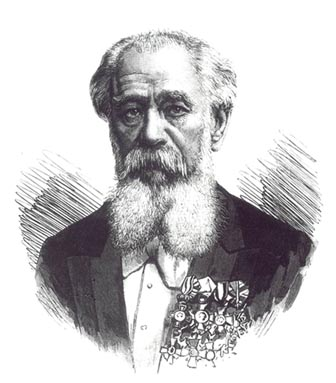
- Born: August 17, 1816; Liegnitz, Province of Silesia, Kingdom of Prussia
- Died: July 13, 1902 (aged 85); Liegnitz, Province of Silesia, German Empire
- Education: Vienna Conservatory
- Occupations: Conductor, Composer

Benjamin Bilse (17 August 1816 – 13 July 1902) was a German conductor, composer, and violinist.

== Biography ==
Bilse was born in Liegnitz (present-day Legnica) in the Prussian Silesia Province. As a teenager, he had an apprenticeship with Scholz alongside 11 other boys. Through this apprenticeship, Bilse was able to accustom himself with all instruments commonly found in a choir as well as gain conducting experience conducting the town pipers. Later on, he obtained a rich musical education at the Vienna Conservatory under violinist Joseph Böhm, and played in the orchestra of Johann Strauss I. He returned to Liegnitz and became municipal Kapellmeister in 1842.

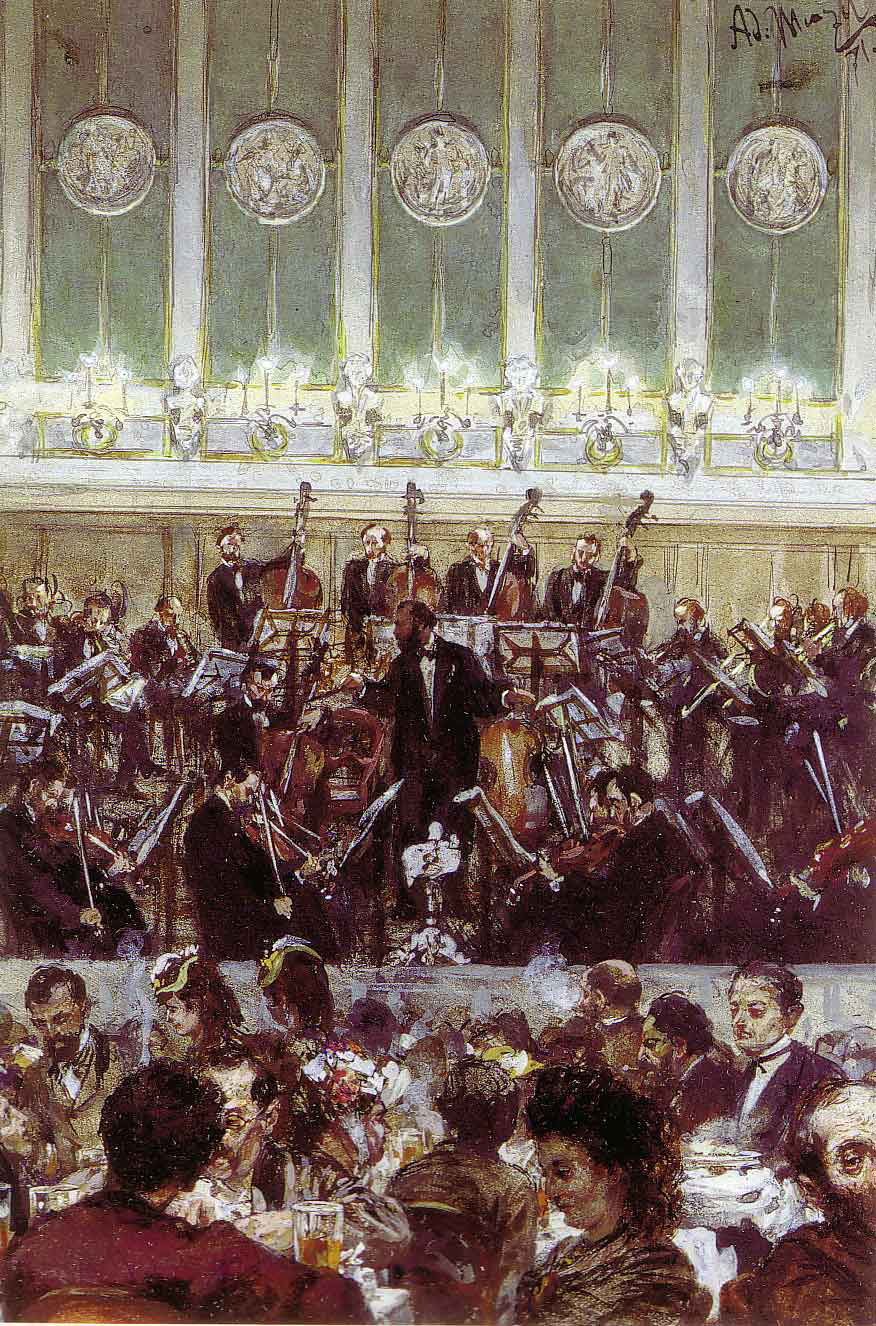
Adolph Menzel: Bilsekonzert, 1871

From 1867 he regularly performed with the "Bilse's Band" (Bilse'sche Kapelle) at the Concerthaus on Leipziger Straße in Berlin. Although initially facing trouble gaining traction, the orchestra became increasingly popular by targeting the middle class as its audience through offering food and drink during concerts. Bilse ignited the music scene in Berlin through this method, the effects of which are still felt today. This concept of a laid-back experience aimed at the middle class also spread across the Atlantic where it inspired Promenade Concerts in Boston, Massachusetts.

Bilse toured Europe and gave guest concerts in Saint Petersburg, Riga, Warsaw, Amsterdam, Vienna, as well as at the 1867 Exposition Universelle in Paris, where his band performed The Blue Danube together with Johann Strauss II. In 1873 Richard Wagner conducted the orchestra in the presence of Emperor Wilhelm I.

After a fierce quarrel with Bilse about another fourth-class concert trip to Warsaw, around 50 musicians in 1882 split to form the "Former Bilse's Band" under conductor Ludwig von Brenner. Shortly afterwards, it was renamed to Berlin Philharmonic, which is now one of the world's leading orchestras. Bilse retired a few years later and returned to Liegnitz where he also died.

== See also ==
- Joachim Andersen
- Eugène Ysaÿe
