= Andrzej Szwalbe =

Polish lawyer, social and cultural activist

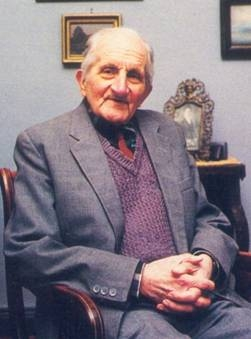
- Andrzej Szwalbe
- Born: Andrzej Jan Szwalbe; 30 June 1923; Warsaw, Poland
- Died: 11 November 2002 (aged 79); Bydgoszcz, Poland
- Resting place: Catholic cemetery of the Sacred Heart of Jesus; 53°08′27″N 17°59′55″E
- Occupations: Lawyer, social and cultural activist
- Known for: First director of the Pomeranian Philharmonic
- Awards

Andrzej Jan Szwalbe (30 June 1923 – 11 November 2002) was a Polish lawyer, social and cultural activist and manager of the musical life in Bydgoszcz. He was the originator and creator of numerous artistic projects outside the region. In 1993, he has been designated as "Honorary Citizen of Bydgoszcz". He was awarded the highest state orders for his contribution to Polish culture.

== Biography ==
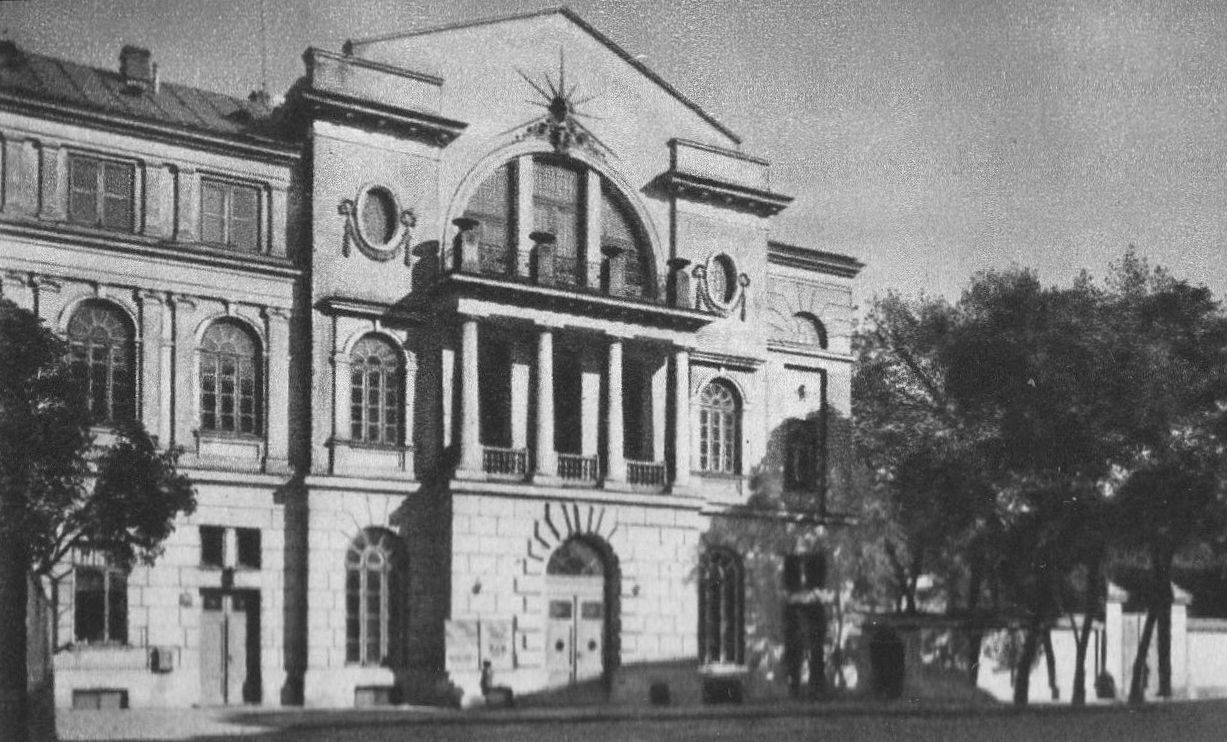
Warsaw Conservatory, prior the Uprising

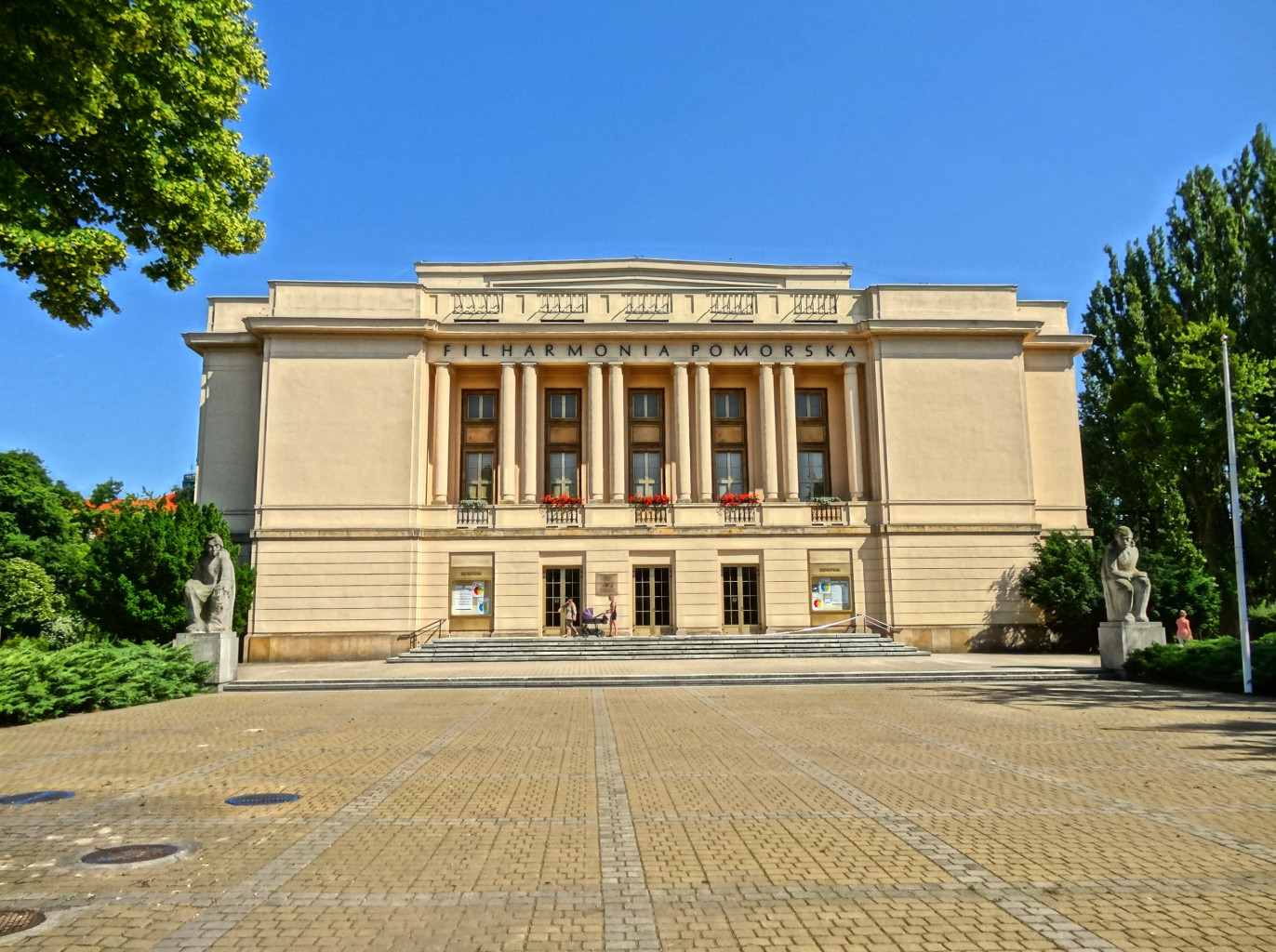
The building of the Pomeranian Philharmonic

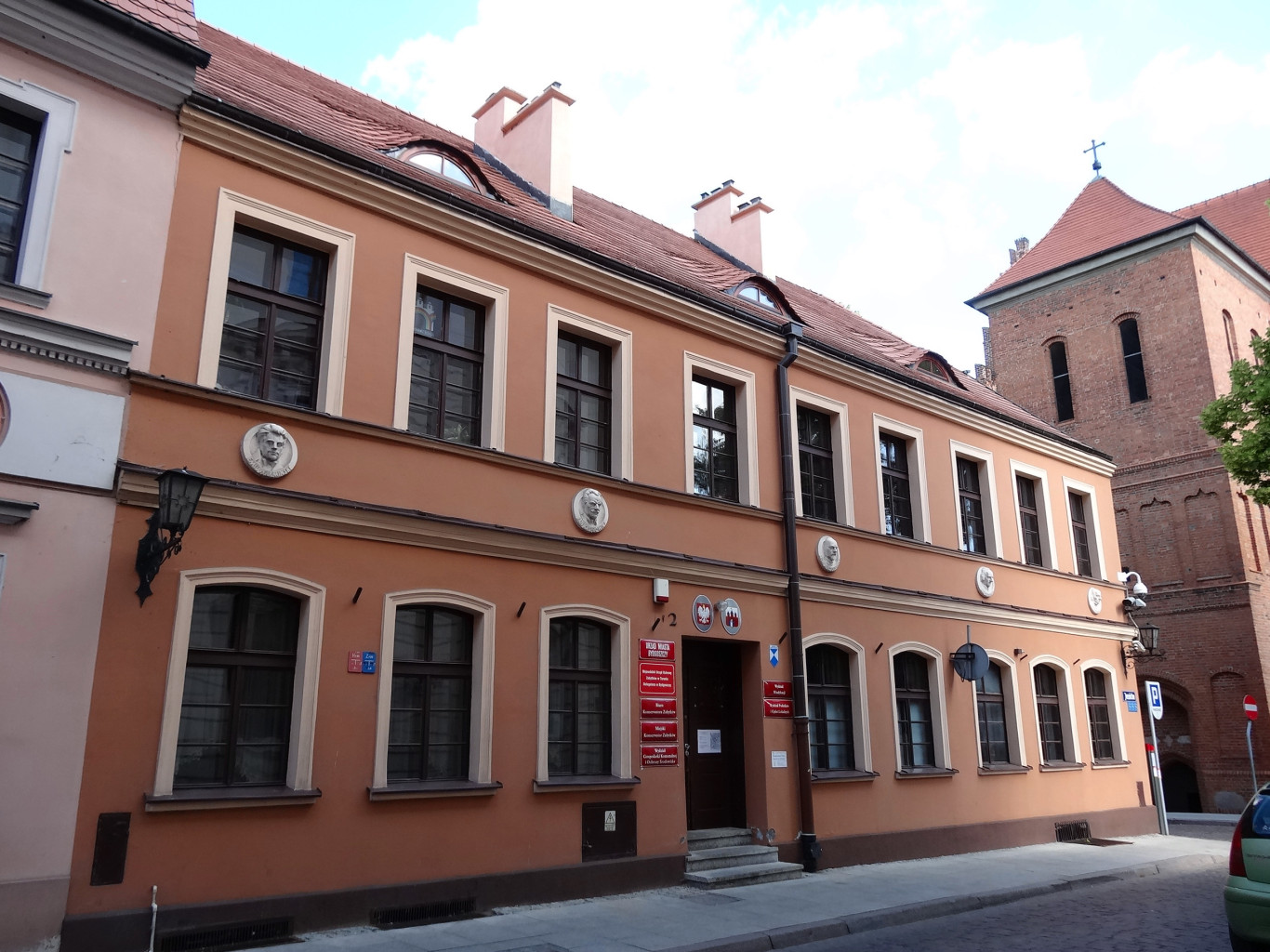
The current seat of the Bydgoszcz Scientific Society, at 8 Jezuicka Street

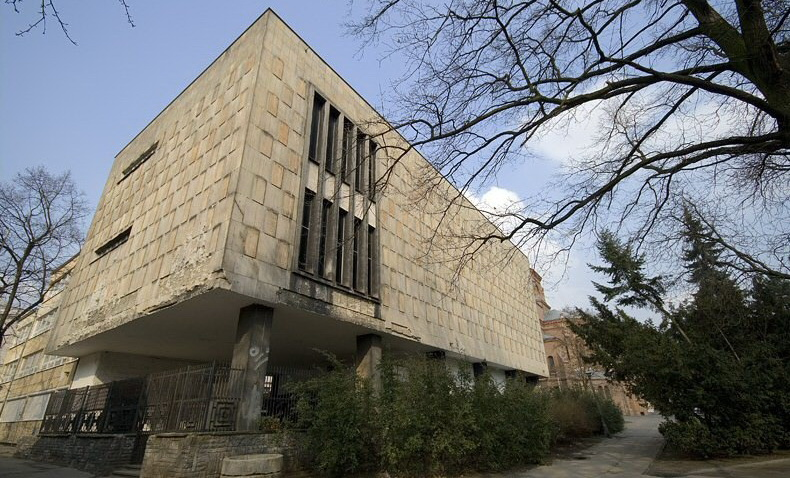
The BWA building with the connection to the Pomeranian Arts House on the left

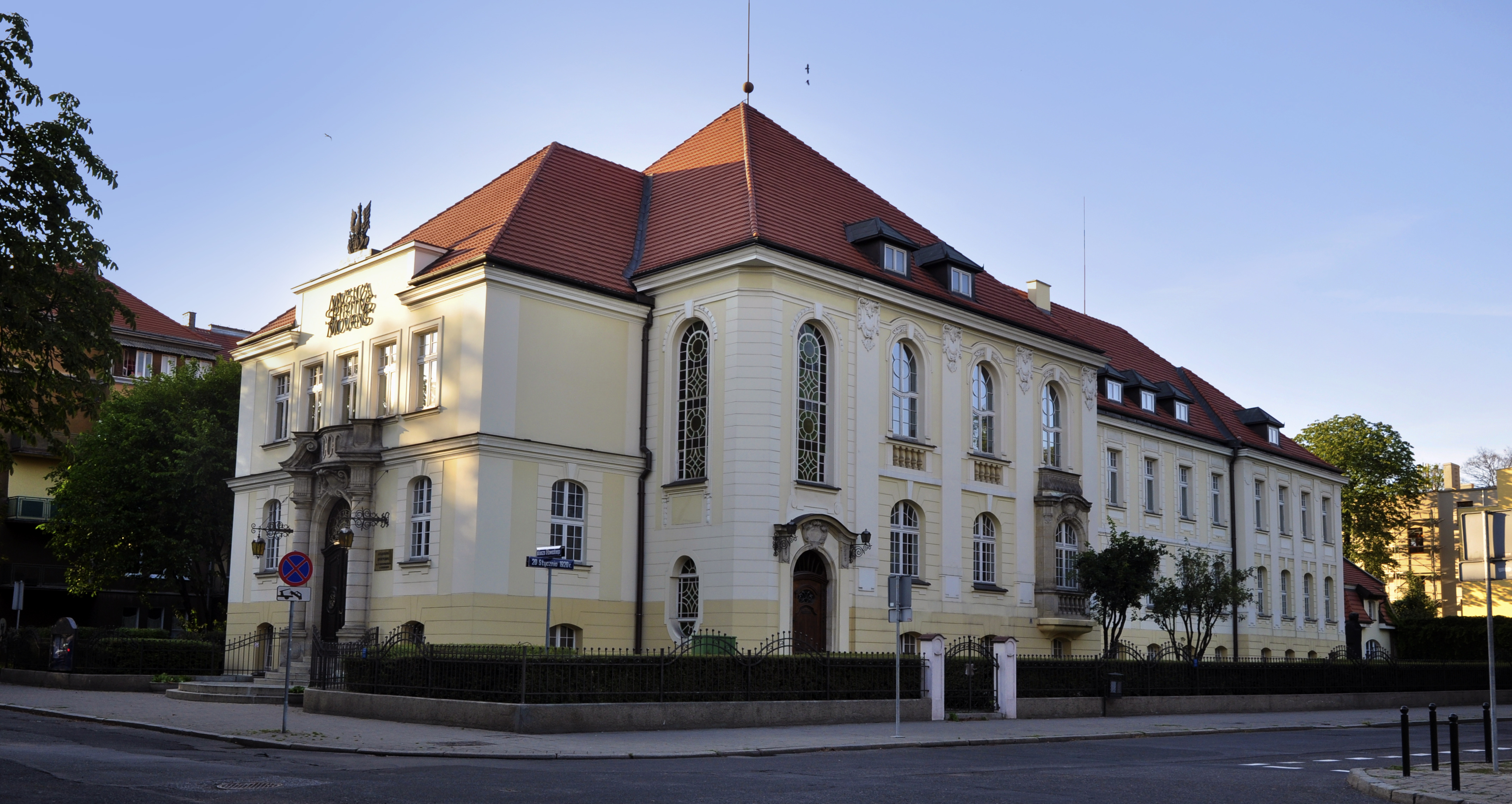
The building of the Bydgoszcz Music Academy

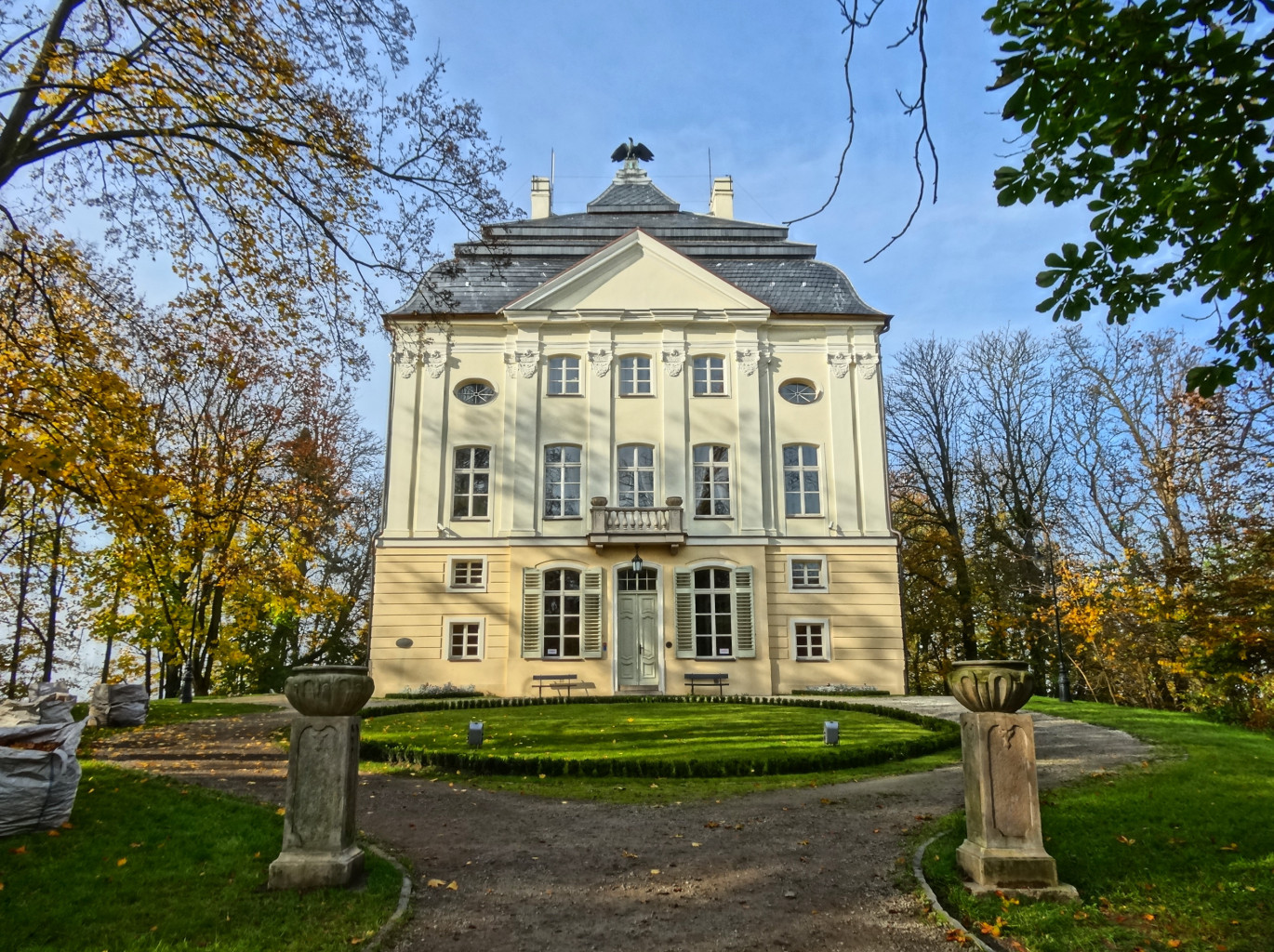
Ostromecko old palace where the Szwalbe piano collection is exhibited

=== Pre-WWI period ===
Andrzej Szwalbe was born on 30 June 1923 in Warsaw. His mother was Eufemia née Sobieraj and his father Sylwester Jan Szwalbe. The latter worked as a tax clerk. His mother had a pivotal influence in the way Andrzej led his life: she believed that his duty was to serve his homeland in the field of high culture and that it was his life's important mission. She loved to read difficult books on national, social and philosophical topics to him.

Andrzej studied in Warsaw at Mikołaj Rej secondary school No. 11 and Adam Mickiewicz secondary school No. 4. Encouraged by his mother to develop and take on self-discipline, he also attended the music school at Chopin University of Music, where he was a piano student in the class of professor Paweł Lewicki. There he met later famous Polish musicians, such as Witold Lutosławski.

During the Nazi occupation, while he was completing his first year of law studies at the University of Warsaw, he also worked as a messenger. In 1944, he was arrested and imprisoned by the Germans in the internment camp 121 of Pruszków; from here he escaped to Kraków.

=== Polish People's Republic years ===
After World War II, Szwalbe lived in Ciechocinek but soon he moved to Bydgoszcz. In 1948, he graduated from law studies at Nicolaus Copernicus University in Toruń and for three years he worked at the university in different positions as an assistant, a lecturer and then head of the Human resources department. However, he was more enthusiastic to become a cultural activist rather than develop his career as a lawyer. In 1949, Szwalbe made himself known to the public by giving a spontaneous speech during a concert of the Pomeranian Philharmonic Symphony Orchestra (the ancestor of the Pomeranian Philharmonic) at the Bydgoszcz Chamber theatre on Grodzka Street for a petition demanding not to abandon the Orchestra. After collecting thousands of signatures, Szwalbe went to the administrative authorities to make his point. This event made him a recognizable figure in the local society.

In 1951, he was appointed administrative director of the Pomeranian Philharmonic Symphony Orchestra. A year later, his efforts were rewarded. As by the decision of the Ministry of Culture and National Heritage on 15 December 1952, the Pomeranian Symphony Orchestra, operating since 1946, in recognition of its high level and merits in the promotion of music, was nationalized on 1 January 1953, taking the name of Ignacy Jan Paderewski Pomeranian Philharmonic. Andrzej Szwalbe was designated as the head of the Social Committee for the Construction of the Philharmonic (Polish: Społeczny Komitet Budowy Filharmonii). The building was erected three years later, with an inaugural concert performed on 16 November 1956, broadcast on the Polish Radio. The architecture of the newly built edifice in Bydgoszcz, designed by Stefan Klajbor, referred to the National Philharmonic in Warsaw.

In the following years, Szwalbe carried out several new projects:

- with Marian Turwid he co-initiated the Bydgoszcz Scientific Society (Polish: Bydgoskie Towarzystwo Naukowe) in 1959;
- he was the initiator of the erection of the Opera Nova (opened in 2006) in the city. Szwalbe was the direct manager of the project for many years after the start of construction in 1973;
- in 1961, he launched a publishing series at the Pomeranian Philharmonic, entitled The history of Polish music in Pomerania (Polish: Z dziejów muzyki polskiej na Pomorzu).

He initiated the establishment of a branch of the Scientific and Research Station of the Institute of Musicology from the University of Warsaw in Bydgoszcz. He conducted extensive scientific activity in coordination with both institutions and the Bydgoszcz Scientific Society, .

In 1962, together with Stanisław Gałoński, a music director and musicologist from Kraków, Andrzej Szwalbe established the Capella Bydgostiensis, one of the leading Polish chamber orchestras dedicated to Early Music. A year later, he inaugurated the Polish Music Festival, which later transformed into the Bydgoszcz Music Festival (Polish: Bydgoski Festiwal Muzyczny).

In 1966, with the help of musicologist Zofia Lissa and prof. Hieronim Feicht (then manager of the Polish music department at the University of Warsaw), Szwalbe set up the international festivals and musicological congresses Musica Antiqua Europae Orientalis (MAEO), which have become a recognized event in Europe and contributed to the increased visibility and popularity of music from Central and Eastern Europe in the world. The achievements of the scientific congresses partnering the MAEO sessions were compiled into several books (e.g. Acta Scientifica) and through the publishing series Monumenta MAEO promote Polish music and culture worldwide.

In 1970, thanks to Szwalbe's efforts, a new gallery for the Municipal Art Gallery BWA was erected at 20 Gdańska Street. He played a decisive role in opening a Bydgoszcz branch of the Academy of Music in Łódź in 1974, which afterwards became an independent institution, the Feliks Nowowiejski Music Academy. To house the latter, Szwalbe took control of the historic building of the Prussian administrative region in 1975, located at the corner of Słowackiego and 20 Stycznia 1920 streets.

Taking specific care to the high artistic level of Bydgoszcz ensembles of the Philharmonic, Andrzej Szwalbe commissioned outstanding Polish composers to write dedicated works, such as the piece for baritone and orchestra, Gray Fog (Polish: Siwa Mgła) by Wojciech Kilar. He intended the Philharmonic to be a cultural melting-pot, combining music with various art disciplines. To achieve this, over the years he built several collections inside the building of the Pomeranian Philharmonic, all related to music:

- a gallery of sculptural portraits of musicians;
- a tapestry collection;
- a unique collection of 18th and 19th century pianos. Nowadays, the Andrzej Szwalbe Collection is visible in nearby Ostromecko palace.

He also made his vision of a Music District in Bydgoszcz a reality by developing the area around the seat of the Philharmonic by installing cultural and educational institutions (i.e. Feliks Nowowiejski Music Academy, Music Schools Group, Jan Kochanowski Park) in the neighbourhood. In particular, the park harbours an outdoor gallery of monuments dedicated to composers and virtuosos.

At the beginning of the 1980s, Szwalbe came up with the idea of restoring the splendor and culture-centric functions to nearby palaces of Ostromecko and Lubostroń. In the former, he set up a gallery of Polish contemporary paintings and graphics from Tadeusz Brzozowski. He envisioned the Palace and park ensemble in Ostromecko to fulfill the role of a Bydgoszcz Wilanów. He expanded the cultural life in Bydgoszcz with consistency, foresight and optimism. He was deeply emotionally connected with the city.

=== Third Polish Republic ===
After retiring in 1991 and handing over the director position of the Philharmonic to Eleonora Harendarska, Szwalbe retained his interest in cultural life and spoke on many issues both on a local and national level. He was awarded the title of Honorary Director of the Pomeranian Philharmonic and received the title of Honorary Citizens of Bydgoszcz in 1993.

Szwalbe was a lover of art and music. He was able to successfully implement his visions and dreams in difficult times (Polish People's Republic) as a creator of culture in Bydgoszcz. Szwalbe's vision, consistency in action, mediation skills, and erudition were always emphasized. His closest musical friends, outstanding Polish composers (Wojciech Kilar, Henryk Mikołaj Górecki, Krzysztof Penderecki) talked about him as a showcase of Bydgoszcz culture.

Andrzej Szwalbe died suddenly on 11 November 2002 in Bydgoszcz, surviving only one month to his wife, Dobrosława. He was buried in the Catholic cemetery of the Sacred Heart of Jesus at 2 Ludwikowo street in Bydgoszcz.

== Awards and recognitions ==
On 18 March 1993, the City Council awarded him the title of Honorary Citizen of Bydgoszcz. It was the first Honorary Citizen title awarded since 1945.

During his lifetime, Andrzej Szwalbe had two books written about him: Andrzej Szwalbe – portret niedokończony (English: Andrzej Szwalbe - an unfinished portrait) by Adam Bezwiński and Życie na przełomie (English: Life at the turn) by Krystyna Starczak-Kozłowska. He also had a bronze bust chiseled by artist Michał Kubiak, which is now exhibited inside the Philharmonic building. On 19 April 2007, Kubiak created a life-size statue of Szwalbe, which stands in the main square of the Philharmonic.

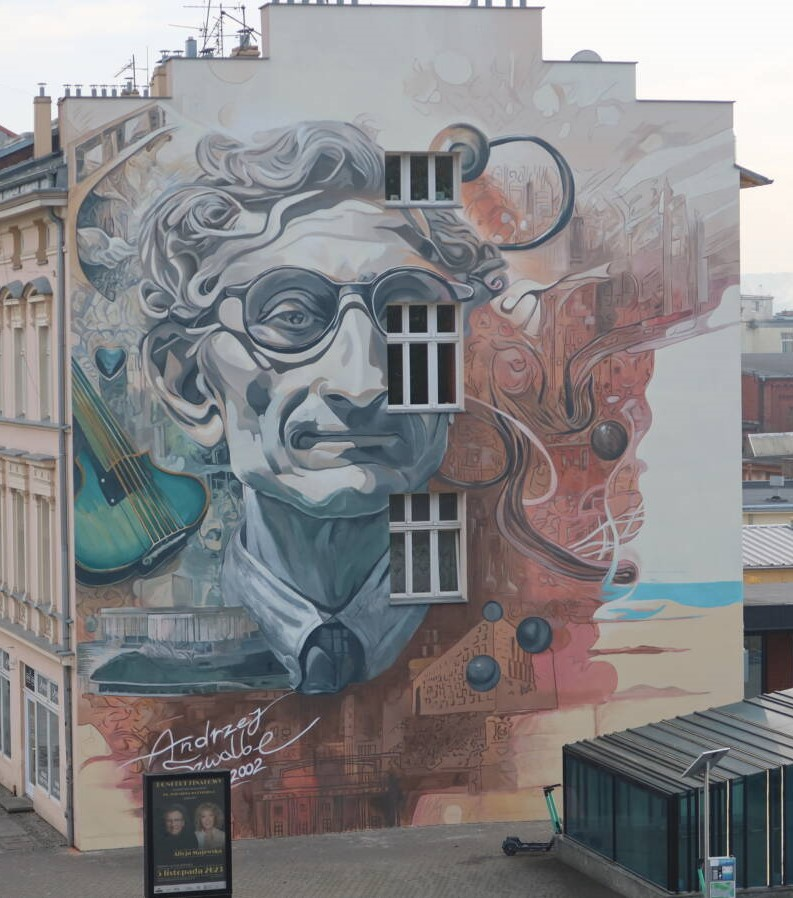
Szwalbe's mural

On 30 June 2003, a commemorative plaque was unveiled on the tenement house where Andrzej Szwalbe lived at 75 Dworcowa Street. Since 2007, he is the patron of the Primary School Nr.67 in Bydgoszcz.

A street in downtown Bydgoszcz, next to the Philharmonic Hall and the Music School ensemble, was renamed in his honor.

The collection of old and historic pianos in Ostromecko Palace is now exhibited as The Andrzej Szwalbe Collection.

On 18 January 2013, the Andrzej Szwalbe "Heritage" association (Polish: Stowarzyszenie im. Andrzeja Szwalbego "Dziedzictwo") has been launched. Its goal is to gather people who are close to the ideas and activities of Andrzej Szwalbe, as a "visionary in the domain of the culture and science", not only in Bydgoszcz but also in the entire region.

In 2017, the namesake of Andrzej Szwalbe has been assigned by plebiscite of Bydgoszcz inhabitants to one of the 18 new tramways purchased by the city.

In November 2023, the city of Bydgoszcz unveiled a mural depicting Andrzej Szwalbe at 89 Dworcowa Street.

=== Honors ===
- Grand Cross of the Order of Polonia Restituta, awarded posthumously by the decision of president Aleksander Kwaśniewski on 15 November 2002, for outstanding services to the national culture;
- Commander's Cross with Star of the Order of Polonia Restituta, awarded in 1996, for outstanding services to the Polish culture;
- Gold Cross of Merit in 1955, on the 10th anniversary of the People's Republic of Poland for merits in the field of culture and art.

== Gallery ==
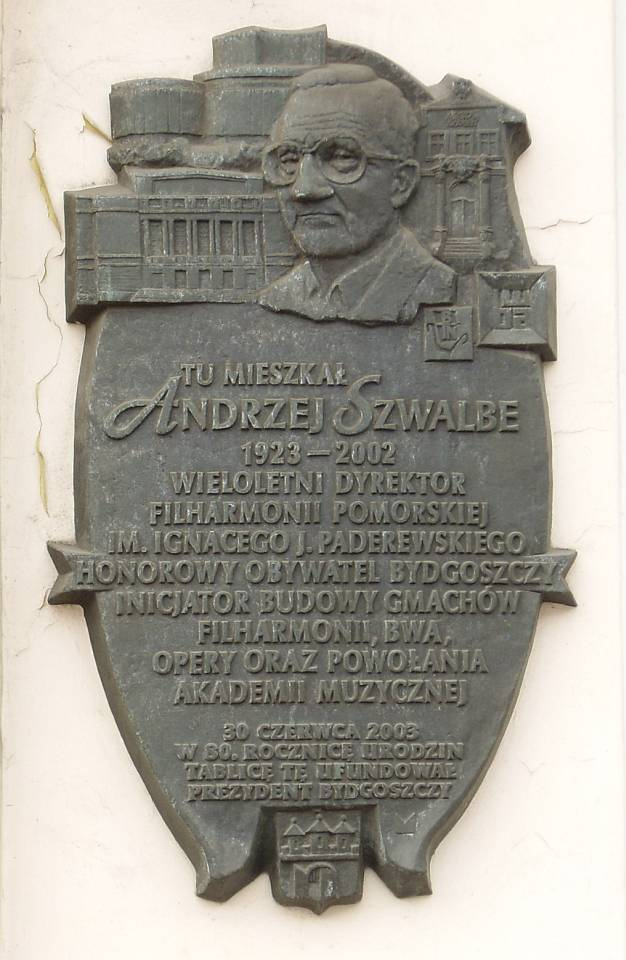
Commemorative plaque at 75, Dworcowa Street, Bydgoszcz

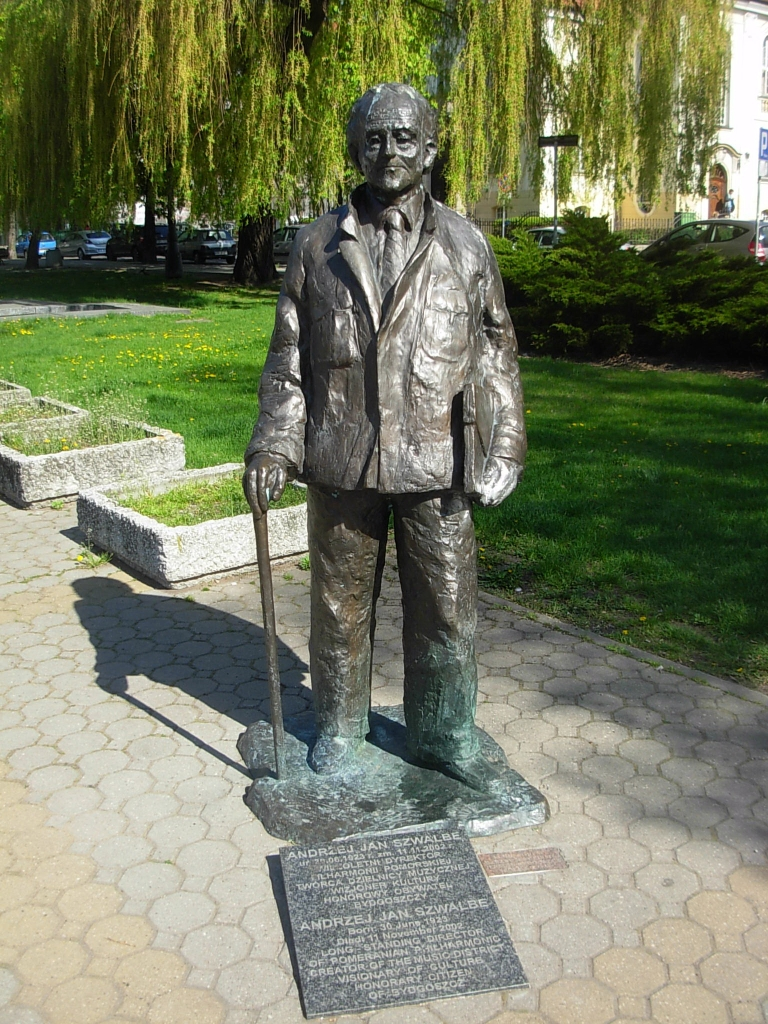
Szwalbe statue by Michał Kubiak (2007)

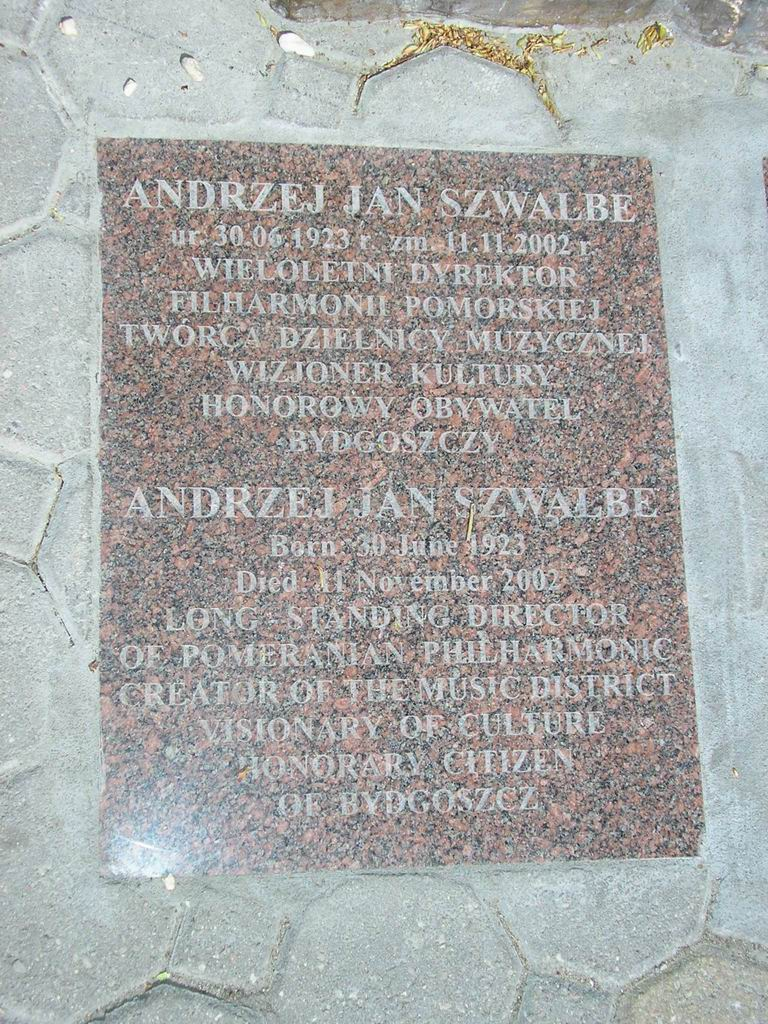
Plaque with engraved text at the bottom of the statue

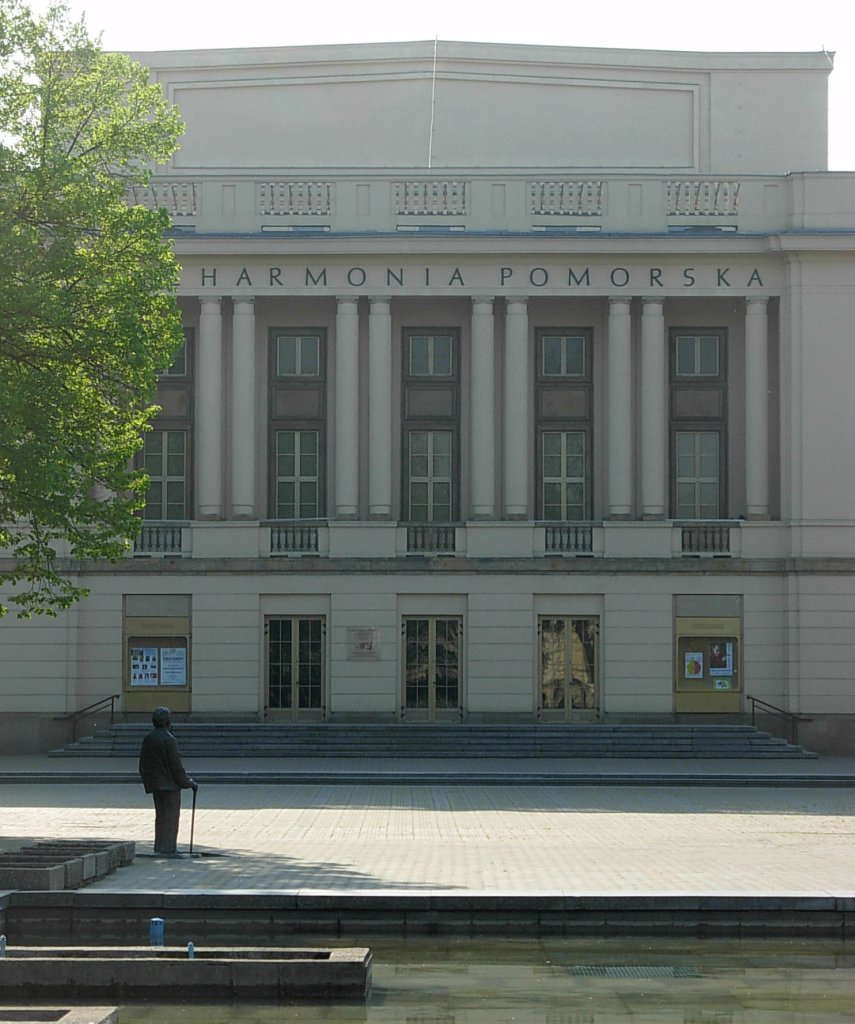
The statue with the Pomeranian Philharmonic building in the backdrop

== See also ==
- Andrzej Szwalbe Street

== Bibliography ==
- Piórek, Magdalena (2001). Jeden człowiek, a jakby instytucja. Kalendarz Bydgoski (in Polish). Bydgoszcz: Towarzystwo Miłośników Miasta Bydgoszczy.
- Bartnicki, Jerzy (1984). Filharmonia Pomorska. Kultura bydgoska 1945-1984 pod red. Krystyny Kwaśniewskiej (in Polish). Bydgoszcz: Bydgoskie Towarzystwo Naukowe.
- Pruss Zdzisław, Weber Alicja, Kuczma Rajmund (2004). Bydgoski leksykon muzyczny (in Polish). Bydgoszcz: Kujawsko-Pomorskie Towarzystwo Kulturalne. pp. 573–575. ISBN 9788389734150.
- Pruss Zdzisław, Weber Alicja (2002). Bydgoski leksykon operowy (in Polish). Bydgoszcz: Kujawsko-Pomorskie Towarzystwo Kulturalne.
