= Irmela Boßler =

German university teacher

Irmela Boßler (born in Freiburg im Breisgau) is a German Western concert flautist.

== Life ==
Boßler, daughter of the composer Kurt Boßler and the singer Ursula Boßler-Moericke, studied flute with professors Gertrud and Karlheinz Zöller at the Hochschule für Musik und Theater Hamburg, where she graduated with distinction. A scholarship at the Herbert von Karajan Academy in Berlin rounded off her music education.

After several years of orchestral activity, a teaching position at the Hochschule für Musik Saar and a guest professorship at the Mozarteum in Salzburg, she was appointed professor for flute at the University of Music and Theatre Leipzig in 1993.

Former students play in the orchestra of the Bavarian Radio, the Concertgebouw Orchestra Amsterdam and the Gewandhaus Orchestra Leipzig. One of her former students is also the flautist and composer Karoline Schulz. Boßler performs mainly with her long-time duo partner, the pianist Bernhard Kastner, at home and abroad. Two CDs with works by Kurt Boßler and Sigfrid Karg-Elert have been released on the Querstand label.
