= Madeleine Carruzzo =

Swiss violinist (born 1956)

Madeleine Carruzzo (born 1956 in Sion, Switzerland) is a Swiss violinist. Since 1 September 1982 she has been a member of the Berlin Philharmonic. She was the first female member of the orchestra.

== Life ==
Madeleine Carruzzo first received guitar lessons and later came to the violin. She graduated from the Hochschule für Musik Detmold where she studied under Tibor Varga.

After studying, she applied to the Zurich Chamber Orchestra as the concertmaster and to the Berlin Philharmonic as an ensemble member. While she was rejected in Switzerland, because at that time a female was not wanted in the position of concertmaster, she received an invitation from the Berlin Philharmonic to an audition on 23 June 1982. There, she succeeded, in competition with 12 other players, all male.

Apart from her work with the Berlin Philharmonic, Madeleine Carruzzo is also active in various chamber music ensembles, including the Metropolis Ensemble Berlin, the Venus Ensemble, and the Philharmonic Streichersolisten.

== Awards ==
- 2001: Prize of the Foundation "Divisionaire FK Rünzi"
- 2012: Prize of the City of Sion
