= Eberhard Preußner =

German music educator

Eberhard Preußner (22 May 1899 – 15 August 1964) was a German music educator.

== Life ==
Born in Słupsk, Preußner was the second of three children of Oskar and Jenny Preußner. He spent his childhood and youth in Stettin, where his father was director of the Bismarck-Oberrealschule there. Eberhard Preußner attended the Marienstiftsgymnasium in Stettin. From 1916 to 1918, he served as a soldier in the First World War. After the war, he studied at the Universität der Künste Berlin and at the Humboldt-Universität zu Berlin, where he received his doctorate in 1924 with the dissertation Die Methodik im Schulgesang der evangelischen Lateinschulen des 17. Jahrhunderts. He dedicated himself to music education. In 1928, he became editor of the journal Die Musik and worked until 1934 with Leo Kestenberg at the Berlin Central Institute for Education and Teaching, and from 1930 to 1944, was editor of the music journal Die Musikpflege.

After the seizure of power by the Nazis, he was a member of the Reichsmusikkammer. In 1939, Preußner went to the Mozarteum in Salzburg, where he became lecturer and managing director and headed the city's concert office. In 1945, he first worked at the Salzburg Volkshochschule, but continued to teach as a lecturer in music history and music education at the Mozarteum, where he was appointed as an extraordinary professor in 1949 after he had accepted Austrian citizenship. In 1959, Preußner became full professor, president of the Academy for Music and Performing Arts, director of the International Summer Academy Mozarteum Salzburg, secretary general of the European Association of Conservatoires and editor of the music pedagogical bibliography. In addition to several guest professorships in the United States, Preußner became a member of the board of directors of the 1960 Salzburg Festival.

He received numerous awards, such as the Decoration of Honour for Services to the Republic of Austria in 1957 and the Austrian Decoration for Science and Art in 1964.

Preußner was the godfather of the cellist Wolfgang Boettcher, who later married his niece Regine Vollmar.

Preußner died in Munich aged 75.

== Publications ==
- Musikgeschichte des Abendlandes Eine Betrachtung f.d. Musikliebhaber.
- Allgemeine Pädagogik und Musikpädagogik. Leipzig 1929.
- Die musikalischen Reisen des Herrn v. Uffenbach. Reisetagebuch 1712–1716. Kassel und Basel 1949.
- Allgemeine Musikerziehung. Heidelberg 1959.
- Wie studiere ich Musik? Heidelberg 1962.
