= Philharmonia Quartet Berlin =

German string quartet

- Years active: 1985; 41 years ago
- Members: Daniel Stabrawa (violin); Christian Stadelmann (violin); Neithard Resa (viola); Dietmar Schwalke (cello)

The Philharmonia Quartet Berlin is a string quartet founded in 1985 by members of the Berlin Philharmonic.

Among the long-standing members were principal players of the orchestra, concertmaster Daniel Stabrawa, second violinist Christian Stadelmann, the principal violist Neithard Resa, and cellist Jan Diesselhorst. When the latter died unexpectedly in 2009, the cello part was taken over by Dietmar Schwalke the same year.

The Philharmonia Quartet has given concerts worldwide, including Wigmore Hall and Carnegie Hall, and has made several recordings. At the Kammermusiksaal of the Berliner Philharmonie, the ensemble performed complete cycles of the string quartets by Beethoven and Shostakovich. The quartet's repertoire covers more than one hundred works from classical music to contemporary music. The string quartet also plays rarely performed compositions of the genre, such as the first string quartet by Erwin Schulhoff, the second string quartet by Karol Szymanowski, Hindemith's Fourth String Quartet and Max Reger's String Quartet No. 3, Op. 74.

They recorded Hindemith's String Quartet No. 5, Op. 32, in 1995. In 2001, they recorded Reger's Clarinet Quintet, Op. 146, with clarinetist Wenzel Fuchs, and his String Quartet No. 4, Op. 109. They recorded all the Beethoven string quartets over years, combined in 2015 when they celebrated their 30th anniversary. On the same occasion, a recording of all the quartets by Johannes Brahms was released. The players, knowing the composers' symphonic works well, have a special approach to the symphonic features in their string quartets.

After the death of second violin Christian Stadelmann in 2019, the status of the ensemble remains unclear.

== Awards ==
- 2000: ECHO Klassik – Beethoven, String Quartet, Op. 130
- 2000: ECHO Klassik – Beethoven, Große Fuge, Op. 133
- 2001: Argentine Critic Price / Buenos Aires (2001)
- 2002: Preis der deutschen Schallplattenkritik – Britten, String Quartets Nos. 2 and 3
- 2003: ECHO Klassik – Benjamin Britten, String Quartets No. 2 and 3
