= Stephan Breith =

German cellist

Stephan Breith (born 1950 in Cologne) is a German cellist.

== Life ==
Breith is the son of the violinist and long-time concertmaster Alfred Breith of the Hr-Sinfonieorchester. He studied with Alexander Molzahn, Leo Koscielny, Siegfried Palm and Enrico Mainardi and passed his artistic matriculation examination and Konzertexamen in Cologne. From 1977 to 2015, he was first solo cellist of the Hessisches Staatstheater Wiesbaden and was appointed its concertmaster in 1992. From 1997 to 2015, he was also a member of the orchestra of the Bayreuth Festival.

Breith played world premieres of works by the composers Hans Zender, Mauricio Kagel, Wilfried Maria Danner etc.

As a member of the French "Ensemble Instrumental Andrée Colson", Breith undertook concert tours through South East Asia, Australia, Africa and Europe. In addition to performances with various chamber music ensembles, he also worked with choreographers and dancers and performed with rock bands ("Rock around Baroque") and with organ, harp, guitar and bandono accompaniment. Since 1995, he has been training with Carin Levine (flute) and Kristi Becker in the trio The Cologne Connection, with whom he also played numerous world premieres and radio productions. After 2000, he initiated several concert series, including Rendezvous at 11h at the Museum Wiesbaden. (since 2003) and Musik-Wort-Malerei+Wein in Herxheim (since 2004). Since 2007, he plays in the quartet of Gabriel Vallejo (with Helena Rüegg and Winfried Holzenkamp), with whom he recorded among others the album Un nuevo comenzo.

Breith also works as a docent at the "Bayerischen Landesjugendorchester", the "Hessischen Landesjugendorchester", the "Akademie für Tonkunst (Darmstadt)" and the "Taiwan Youth Orchestra".
