= Daniel Stabrawa =

Polish violinist and conductor (born 1955)

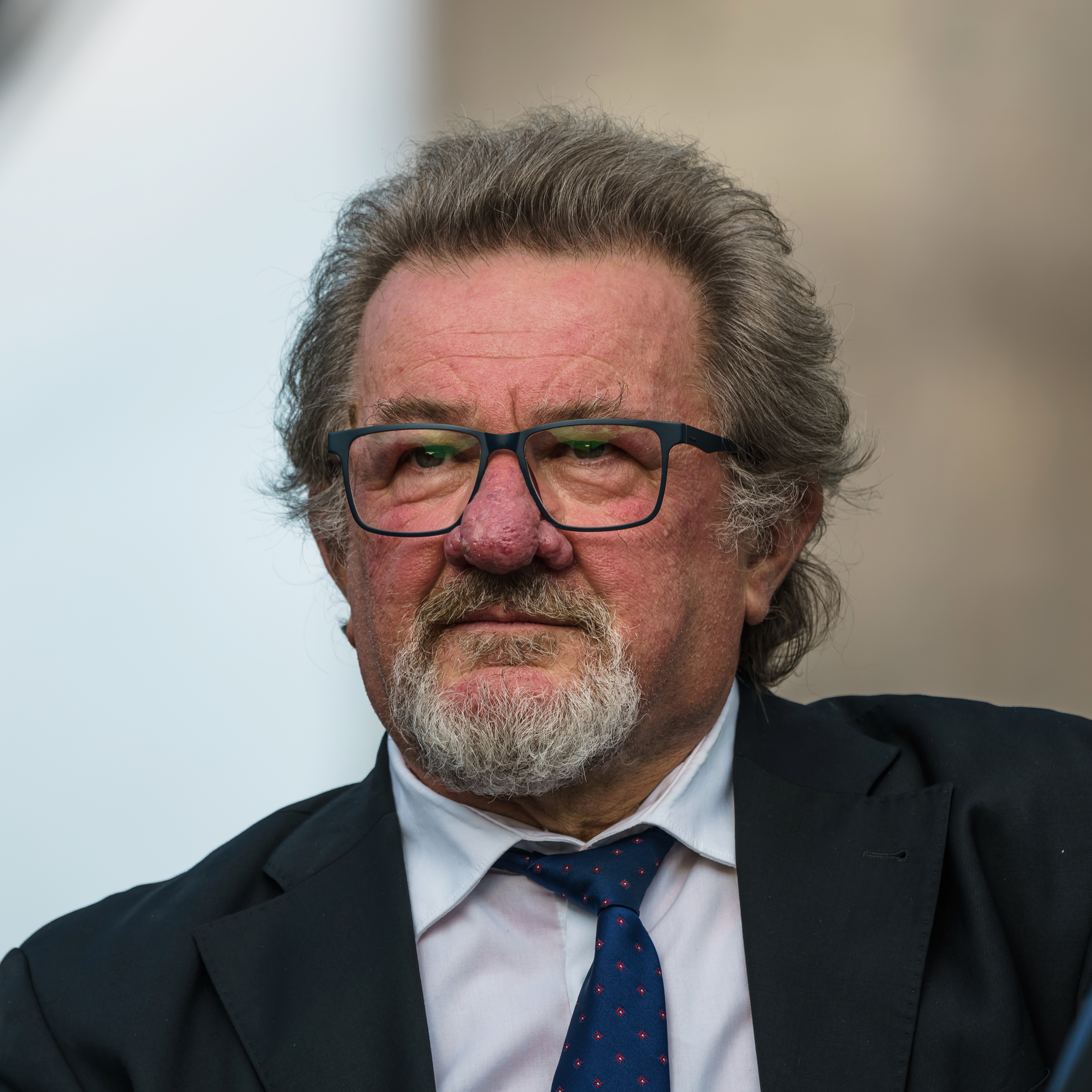
- Daniel Stabrawa 2019
- Born: 23 August 1955 (age 69); Kraków, Poland
- Occupations: Conductor; Violinist; Concertmaster
- Organizations: Berlin Philharmonic

Daniel Stabrawa (born 23 August 1955 in Kraków) is a Polish violinist and conductor.

== Life ==
Stabrawa began playing the violin at the age of seven and studied playing the violin at the Music Academy in Kraków with Zbigniew Szlezer. In 1979 he became concertmaster of the Polish Radio Symphony Orchestra in Kraków. In 1983 he joined the first violins of the Berlin Philharmonic. In 1985 he founded the internationally renowned Philharmonia Quartet Berlin together with three colleagues from the Berlin Philharmonic.

In 1986 he became one of the three first concertmasters of the Berlin Philharmonic as the successor of Michel Schwalbé under the conductor Herbert von Karajan, a position he held until his retirement in 2021. From 1986 to 2000 he taught at the Orchestra Academy of the Berlin Philharmonic.

Since 1994 Stabrawa acts also as a conductor. He worked together with internationally renowned artists such as Nigel Kennedy and Albrecht Mayer.

Stabrawa is married to the concert pianist Elżbieta Stabrawa. Their daughter Maria Stabrawa is also an international violinist. Together with her and several other string musicians in 2008 he founded the Stabrawa Ensemble Berlin.

== Discography (selection) ==
- All quartet recordings at label Thorofon
- Antonio Vivaldi: The Vivaldi Album Vol 1, Nigel Kennedy and Daniel Stabrawa (violin) EMI 5576482 (2004)
- Antonio Vivaldi: The Vivaldi Album Vol 2, Nigel Kennedy and Daniel Stabrawa (violin) EMI 5578592 (2004)
- Romantic oboe concertos in the 20th Century, Albrecht Mayer (oboe), Capella Bydgostiensis, conducted by Daniel Stabrawa, Cavalli Records CCD 408 (2003)
- Johann Sebastian Bach: Concerto for Two Violins in D minor, BWV 1043, Berlin Philharmonic Orchestra, Nigel Kennedy and Daniel Stabrawa (violin), EMI 57 091 (2000)
