= Alexander Molzahn =

German cellist

Alexander Molzahn (25 August 1907 – 1 December 1998) was a German cellist and university teacher.

== Life ==
Born in Frankfurt, Molzahn studied in Berlin with Georg Wille (1869–1958) and Adolf Steiner (1897–1974). He was professor at the Frankfurt University of Music and Performing Arts and taught at the Hoch Conservatory. His students included Maria Kliegel, Peter Cahn, Jan Diesselhorst and Stephan Breith.

Molzahn died in Frankfurt at the age of 91.
