= Michel Schwalbé =

French violinist

Michel Schwalbé (27 October 1919 – 8 October 2012) was a French violinist of Polish origin.

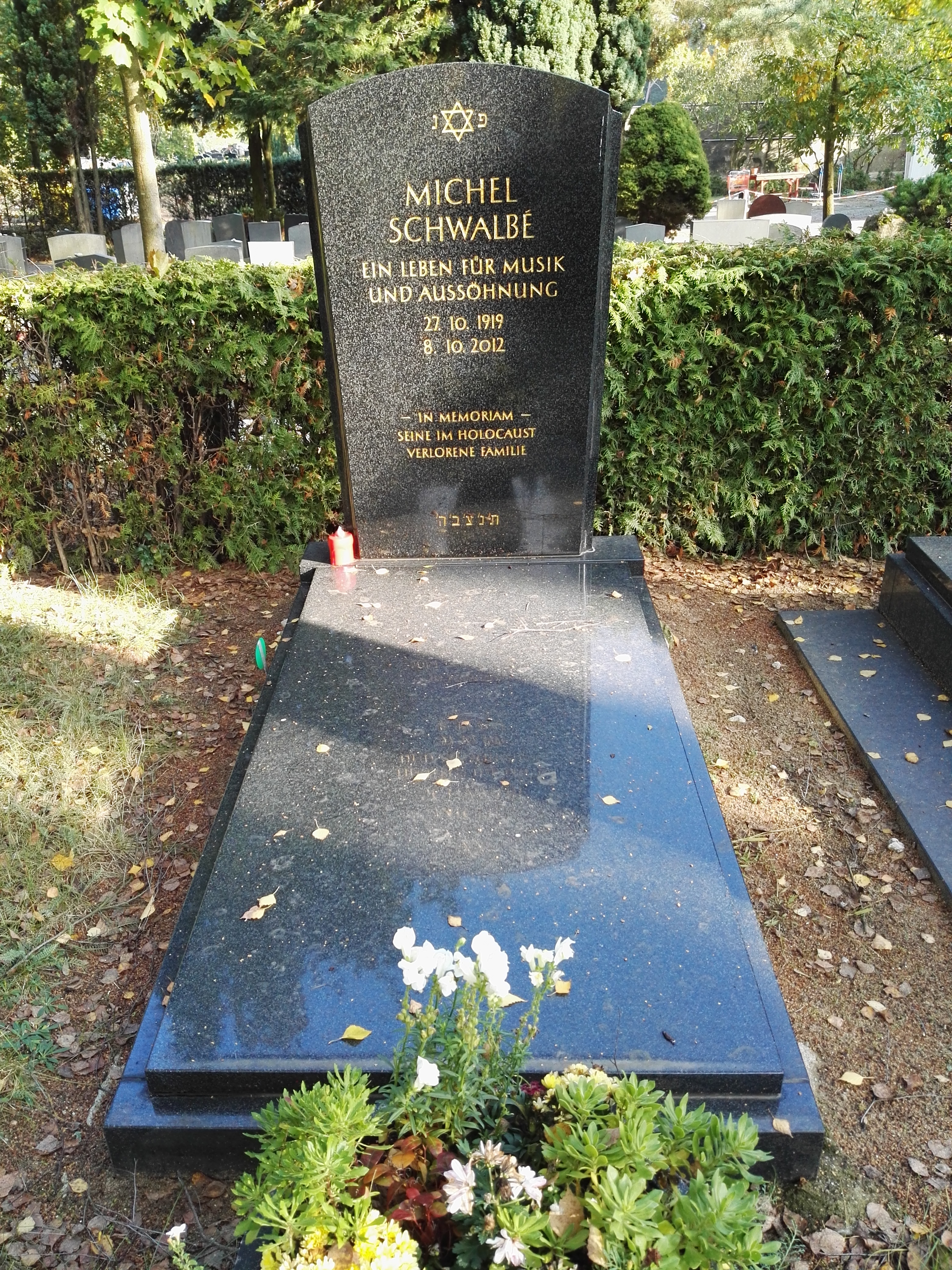
Grave at the Jüdischer Friedhof Heerstraße Berlin

== Biography ==
Born in Radom (Poland), Schwalbé studied in his youth with Moritz Frenkel, then continued his studies in Paris and worked with Georges Enesco, Pierre Monteux and Jules Boucherit. He took French citizenship at that time. Then came the war, and Schwalbé being Jewish, fled France in 1942 and settled in Switzerland. He became soloist of the Orchestre de la Suisse Romande in Geneva from 1944 to 1946, then in Lausanne until 1957, when Herbert von Karajan offered him the position of concertmaster of the Berlin Philharmonic. During his Swiss period, Schwalbé created his own quartet and succeeded Joseph Szigeti at the Conservatoire de musique de Genève.

Schwalbé died in Berlin on 8 October 2012.

== Notable recordings ==
- Bach's Brandenburg Concertos, Herbert von Karajan, Berliner Philharmoniker, 1965, Deutsche Grammophon Gesellschaft
- Vivaldi's The Four Seasons, Herbert von Karajan, Berliner Philharmoniker, 1972, Deutsche Grammophon Gesellschaft
- Nikolai Rimsky-Korsakov's Scheherazade, Op.35; Herbert von Karajan, Berliner Philharmoniker, 1987, Deutsche Grammophon Gesellschaft
- Richard Strauss' Also sprach Zarathustra, Op.30; Karl Böhm, Berliner Philharmoniker, 1958, Deutsche Grammophon Gesellschaft
- Richard Strauss' Also sprach Zarathustra, Op.30; Herbert von Karajan, Berliner Philharmoniker, 1974, Deutsche Grammophon Gesellschaft
- Richard Strauss' Ein Heldenleben, Op.40; Herbert von Karajan, Berliner Philharmoniker, 1959, Deutsche Grammophon Gesellschaft
