= Ludwig von Brenner =

German conductor and composer

Ludwig von Brenner (19 September 1833 – 9 February 1902) was a German conductor and composer.

He was born in Leipzig, and studied at Leipzig conservatoire, later going to Saint Petersburg to play in the court orchestra of the Tsar. In 1872 he returned to Germany, conducting an orchestra known as the Berlin Symphony Orchestra before establishing his own Neue Berliner Symphoniekapelle in 1876. In 1882 he became the first conductor of the newly established Berlin Philharmonic Orchestra, leading its Berlin debut concert on October 17 of that year. He continued to conduct the orchestra until 1884. He later went to Breslau, conducting an orchestra in succession to Meyder. He died in Berlin.

He was especially renowned as a composer of sacred music. His works include 4 grand masses; 2 Te Deums; symphonic poems, overtures, and other orchestral music.
