= Tadeusz Brzozowski (painter) =

Polish painter

Tadeusz Brzozowski (1918–1987) was a Polish painter.

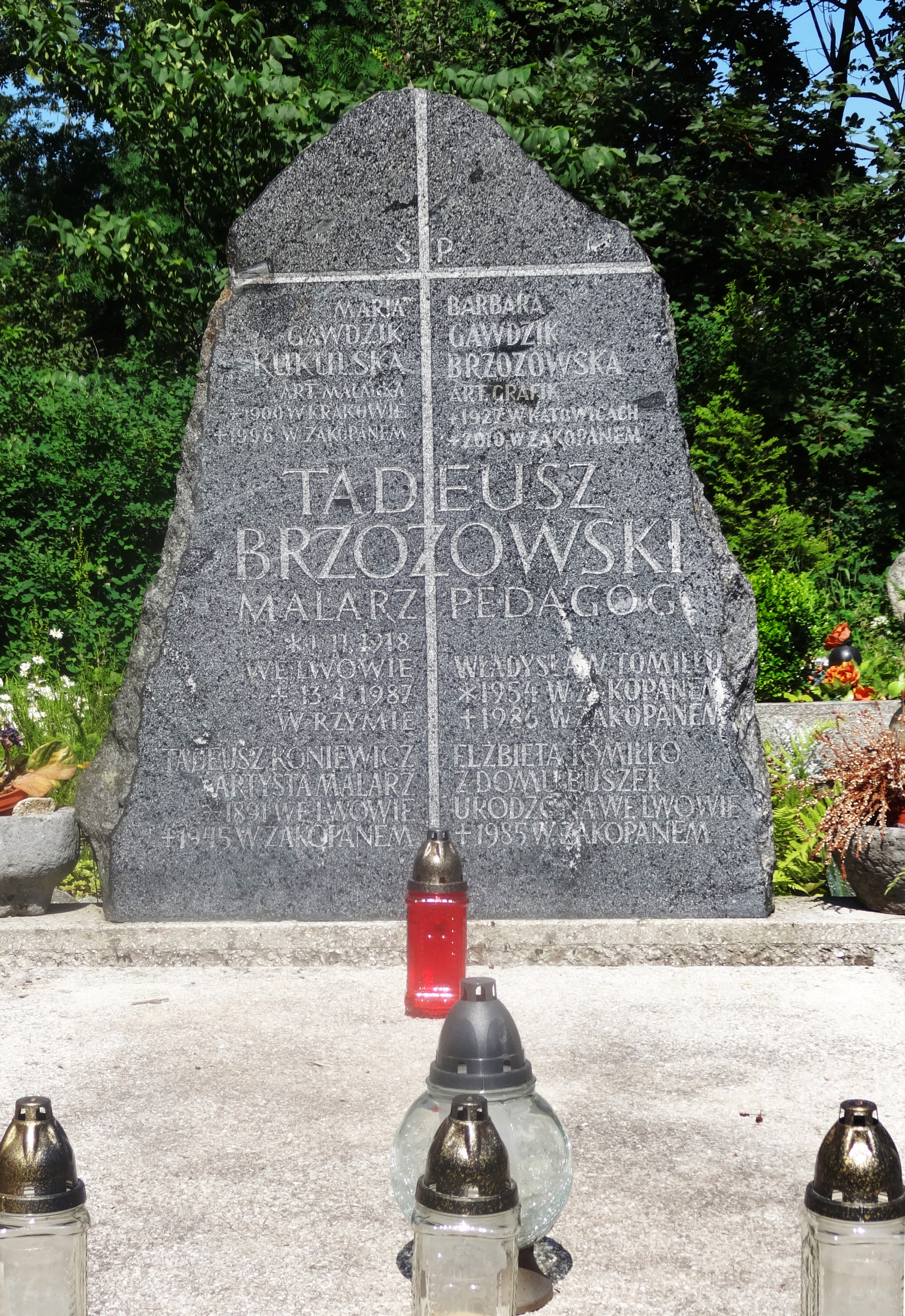
His grave in Zakopane's new cemetery

His wife was Barbara Gawdzik-Brzozowska (1927-2010). He had two sons, Wawrzyniec (translator and art historian) and Joachim (therapist).
