= Christian Stadelmann =

German violinist (1959–2019)

Christian Stadelmann (1959 – 26 July 2019) was a German violinist. For many years he was leader of the second violin section of the Berlin Philharmonic.

== Life ==
Stadelmann was born in Berlin; he studied at the Berlin University of the Arts with Thomas Brandis, afterwards becoming a member of the Junge Deutsche Philharmonie.

In 1985 he joined the Berlin Philharmonic as a second violinist, and two years later he became section leader. With orchestra colleagues he founded the Philharmonia Quartet Berlin, in which he was second violin. He taught at the Karajan Academy.

He died on 26 July 2019, aged 60, after a serious illness. Knut Weber, cellist and member of the Berlin Philharmonic's orchestra board, said: "Not only was he an outstanding musician, but for more than twenty years he represented the Berlin Philharmonic as a member of the Fünferrat (council of five). In addition, as a teacher of the Karajan Academy, he trained numerous young violinists, some of whom are now members of our orchestra themselves."
