= Digital Concert Hall =

Online website of the Berlin Philharmonic Orchestra

- Website type: Streaming media
- Available in: German, English, Spanish, Japanese, Korean and Chinese
- Owner: Berlin Philharmonic Orchestra
- Website: www.digitalconcerthall.com
- Launched: 2008

The Digital Concert Hall is an online website which streams and transmits the concerts of the Berlin Philharmonic Orchestra on demand.

== History ==
The Digital Concert Hall was founded at the end of 2008. The Berlin Philharmonic has done pioneering work by establishing this institution. From 2008 to 2016, Deutsche Bank was the main sponsor of the Digital Concert Hall.

The institution has been awarded the LeadAward 2009 in gold in the category 'WebTV', the DMMA OnlineStar 2009 in bronze, and numerous other awards.

== Purpose ==
Around 40 Berlin Philharmonic concerts per year are transmitted by the Digital Concert Hall from the Berlin Philharmonie and can be streamed live in high-definition video and excellent audio quality. In addition, after a few days' post-processing, the concerts can be accessed in the concert archive of the Digital Concert Hall. The comprehensive archive consists of recent concerts, mostly directed by Sir Simon Rattle, but also older performances such as 1990s concerts with Claudio Abbado. Concerts from other venues, for instance the "Waldbühne" (Berlin's open-air stage), or a series of "Europakonzerte", are also included.

Moreover, there are documentaries such as the film Rhythm Is It! which deals with a group of Berlin youths and their efforts to realise the ballet Le Sacre du printemps by Stravinsky in cooperation with the Berlin Philharmonic, the documentary "Trip to Asia", contributions from the educational program of the Berlin Philharmonic, plus interviews with conductors or soloists.

The documentaries, Education contributions or interviews are usually free of charge, whereas the Philharmonic concerts must be paid for. There are several different ticket options for Digital Concert Hall access: the 7-Day, 30-Day and the 12-Month Ticket. During the given period, the user is entitled to watch as many concerts as he or she wishes. Lastly, there is also a monthly subscription which is automatically extended unless one cancels the arrangement. Tickets are also available as gift vouchers.

Since July 2014, the archive of the Digital Concert Hall also contains a collection of archived concerts from the 1960s and early 1970s in which the orchestra is led by Herbert von Karajan, then the chief conductor. One can directly compare different interpretations of certain pieces, which serves to illustrate the changes in conducting over the last decades.

== Technology ==
To capture the moving images during the concerts, seven high-definition video cameras have been installed above the orchestra's stage in the Berlin concert hall. These cameras, as well as the microphones, can be operated by remote control.
