= The 12 Cellists of the Berlin Philharmonic =

The 12 Cellists of the Berlin Philharmonic (German: Die 12 Cellisten der Berliner Philharmoniker) are an all-cello ensemble featuring the cellists of the Berlin Philharmonic.

== Current members ==
The group consists of the fourteen cellists of the Berlin Philharmonic, with twelve performing at any given time.

- Bruno Delepelaire, principal
- Martin Löhr, principal
- Olaf Maninger, principal
- Ludwig Quandt, principal
- Richard Duven
- Rachel Helleur
- Christoph Igelbrink
- Solène Kermarrec
- Stephan Koncz
- Martin Menking
- David Riniker
- Nikolaus Römisch
- Dietmar Schwalke
- Knut Weber

== Recordings ==
- South American Getaway (CD, EMI 2000)
- Round Midnight (CD, EMI 2002)
- As time goes by (CD, EMI 2004)
- Angel Dances (CD, EMI 2006)
- Fleur de Paris (CD, EMI 2010)
- Die 12 Cellisten: Anniversary concert 40 years & documentary film (DVD, Euroarts 2012)
- Hora Cero (CD, Sony CLASSICAL 2016)
