= Karajan Academy =

- Karajan-Akademie der Berliner Philharmoniker
- Established: 1972
- Founders: Herbert von Karajan
- Affiliation: Berlin Philharmonic
- Chairman: Marc Müller
- Location: Berlin, Germany; 52°30′36″N 13°22′15″E
- Website: www.berliner-philharmoniker.de/en/about-us/karajan-akademie/

The Karajan Academy is a music academy in Berlin, Germany, associated with the Berlin Philharmonic, that trains young orchestral musicians.

== Background ==
The Academy is a non-profit organization, financed by donations; its work is supported by a voluntary board and an advisory board. Originally named the Orchester-Akademie der Berliner Philharmoniker, it was founded in 1972 by Herbert von Karajan (1908–1989), conductor of the Berlin Philharmonic, to train young musicians for the orchestra. Those whose musical education was mostly based on a solo repertoire could improve themselves in the community of the orchestra's musicians.

In May 2017, at a meeting of the orchestra, it was agreed that the Academy would be renamed after Herbert von Karajan.

== The course ==
About a third of the current members of the Berlin Philharmonic have come through from the Academy. The two-year course, available for players of all orchestral instruments, is at the same time a postgraduate course and an internship. The student receives personal tuition, usually from the concertmaster or section leader; regularly takes part in orchestral rehearsals and concerts; becomes familiar with chamber music, of which the repertoire includes classic, romantic and classic modern works; and is trained to prepare for auditions.
