= Berlin Philharmonic =

German symphony orchestra

- Orchestra
- Native name: Berliner Philharmoniker
- Former name: Frühere Bilsesche Kapelle, Berliner Philharmonisches Orchester
- Founded: 1882; 144 years ago (precursor Bilsesche Kappelle since 1867)
- Location: Berlin, Germany
- Concert hall: Berliner Philharmonie
- Principal conductor: Kirill Petrenko
- Website: berliner-philharmoniker.de

The Berlin Philharmonic (German: Berliner Philharmoniker) is a German symphony orchestra that is based in Berlin and was founded in 1882. One of the most popular, acclaimed and well-respected orchestras in the world, the orchestra is the recipient of numerous Grammy Awards, Gramophone Awards, Classic BRIT Awards, ECHO Music Prizes, Grand Prix Du Disque and Diapason d'Or.

The orchestra emerged from the Bilsesche Kapelle ("Bilse's Band") and rose to prominence under the leadership of pianist-conductor Hans von Bülow. During the 20th century, the orchestra was led by conductors Wilhelm Furtwängler (1922–45; 1952–54), Herbert von Karajan (1955–89), and Claudio Abbado (1989–2002). The orchestra's early years, particularly during the later Nazi era, focused heavily on Classical music from the Austro-Germanic repertoire, featuring composers such as Beethoven, Brahms, Bruckner, Strauss, and Wagner. Under Furtwängler and Karajan, it became renowned for its distinctive sound and high-quality musicianship and toured widely. In the latter half of the 20th century, the orchestra broadened its repertoire to include more Classical, Romantic, and 20th-century works, as well as lesser-known compositions and music from outside the Austro-German tradition.

Since Furtwängler's tenure, the orchestra has made numerous recordings, with the number of recordings expanding significantly during the Karajan era. Under Karajan's leadership, the orchestra experimented with new recording technologies and achieved worldwide fame through its studio recordings, most of which have been released under the Deutsche Grammophon label. The orchestra is particularly known for its recordings of symphonic works by Classical, Romantic, and early 20th-century composers, several of which have won international awards and received critical acclaim.

In the 21st century, the orchestra launched its own Digital Concert Hall in 2009 and its label, Berliner Philharmoniker Recordings, in 2014. Each year, the orchestra collaborates with a designated artist-in-residence and composer-in-residence. Following the term of Sir Simon Rattle (2002–2018), Kirill Petrenko has been the music director and conductor since 2019. The orchestra's current home is the Berliner Philharmonie.

== History ==
The Berlin Philharmonic was founded in Berlin in 1882 by 54 musicians under the name Frühere Bilsesche Kapelle (literally, "Former Bilse's Band"); the group broke away from their previous conductor Benjamin Bilse after he announced his intention of taking the band on a fourth-class train to Warsaw for a concert. The orchestra was renamed and reorganized under the financial management of Hermann Wolff in 1882. Their new conductor was Ludwig von Brenner; in 1887 Hans von Bülow, the conductor of the Meiningen Court Orchestra and one of the most famous piano virtuosos of the time, took over the post. This helped to establish the orchestra's international reputation, and guests Hans Richter, Felix von Weingartner, Richard Strauss, Gustav Mahler, Johannes Brahms and Edvard Grieg conducted the orchestra over the next few years. In 1887, the pianist and composer Mary Wurm became the first woman to conduct the orchestra. Programmes of this period show that the orchestra possessed only 46 strings, much less than the Wagnerian ideal of 64.

In 1895, Arthur Nikisch became chief conductor, and was succeeded in 1923 by Wilhelm Furtwängler. Despite several changes in leadership, the orchestra continued to perform throughout World War II. On 20 April 1942, Furtwängler conducted a performance of Beethoven's Ninth Symphony with the Berlin Philharmonic for Hitler's birthday. Following the end of the performance, Joseph Goebbels approached the podium to shake Furtwängler's hand. This concert led to intense criticism of Furtwängler after the war. After Furtwängler (who was personally opposed to the Nazi regime) fled to Switzerland to escape arrest by the Gestapo in January 1945, Leo Borchard became chief conductor. The final wartime concert was on 12 April 1945, just before the commencement of the Battle of Berlin. The program included Brünnhilde's Immolation Scene, the finale from Wagner's Götterdämmerung (Twilight of the Gods). Hitler Youth members are reported to have distributed cyanide pills to the audience for those who wished, by death, to escape the imminent arrival of the Red Army. The battle forced the orchestra to close for two months, but it was quickly reopened by the Soviet occupation authorities under the East Berlin commandant General Nikolai Berzarin on 26 May 1945.

Borchard was accidentally shot and killed later in 1945 by the U.S. Army forces occupying West Berlin. Sergiu Celibidache then took over as chief conductor for seven years, from 1945 to 1952. Furtwängler returned as chief conductor in 1952 and held the post until his death in 1954.

The orchestra elected Herbert von Karajan as its next chief conductor. Karajan served in the post from 1955 until his resignation in April 1989, only months before his death. Under him, the orchestra made a vast number of recordings and toured widely, growing and gaining fame. The orchestra hired its first female musician, violinist Madeleine Carruzzo, in 1982. However, Karajan's hiring in September 1982 of Sabine Meyer, the first female wind player to the orchestra, led to controversy when the orchestra voted 73 to 4 not to admit her to the orchestra. Meyer subsequently left the orchestra. After Karajan stood down from the orchestra in 1989, the orchestra offered the chief conductorship to Carlos Kleiber, who declined.

In 1989, the orchestra elected Claudio Abbado as its next principal conductor. It was the first time the Philharmonic resorted to democratic voting after the fall of the Berlin Wall in 1989. Abbado expanded the orchestra's repertoire beyond the core classical and romantic works into more modern 20th-century works. Abbado stepped down from the chief conductorship of the orchestra in 2002. During the post-unification period, the orchestra encountered financial problems resulting from budgetary stress in the city of Berlin. In 2006, the Orchestra Academy of the Berlin Philharmonic established the Claudio Abbado Composition Prize in Abbado's honour.

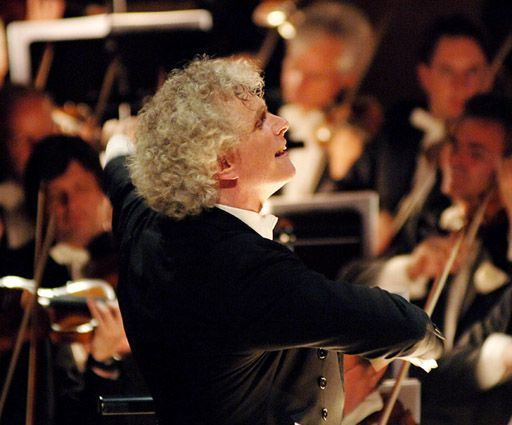
Sir Simon Rattle conducting the Berlin Philharmonic Orchestra in 2006

In June 1999, the musicians elected Sir Simon Rattle as their next chief conductor. Rattle made it a condition of his signing with the Berlin Philharmonic that it be turned into a self-governing public foundation, with the power to make its own artistic and financial decisions. This required a change to state law, which was approved in 2001, allowing him to join the organization in 2002. In his first season, he initiated community projects, such as a performance of Stravinsky's Le Sacre du printemps danced by 250 public school children, documented in Rhythm Is It!. Rattle's contract with the orchestra was initially until 2012. In April 2008, the BPO musicians voted in favour of retaining Rattle as their chief conductor until 2018.

From 2006 to 2010, the general manager of the orchestra was Pamela Rosenberg. In September 2010, Martin Hoffmann became the orchestra's new Intendant. Hoffmann stood down as its Intendant after the close of the 2016/2017 season. Andrea Zietzschmann became Intendantin of the orchestra as of the 2017–2018 season. In December 2020, the orchestra announced the extension of Zietzschmann's contract as Intendantin until 31 August 2025. In February 2024, the orchestra announced a further extension of Zietzschmann's contract as Intendantin through the summer of 2028. In June 2026, the orchestra announced that Zietzschmann is to stand down as the orchestra's Intendantin at the close of her current contract in August 2028.

In 2006, the orchestra announced it would investigate its role during the Nazi regime. In 2007, Misha Aster published The Reich's Orchestra, his study of the relationship of the Berlin Philharmonic to the rulers of the Third Reich. Also in 2007, the documentary film The Reichsorchester by Enrique Sánchez Lansch was released.

UNICEF appointed the Berlin Philharmonic Orchestra and Rattle as Goodwill Ambassadors in November 2007. On 10 January 2013, the orchestra announced the scheduled end of Rattle's tenure as artistic director and chief conductor in 2018. In 2014, the orchestra founded its own label, Berliner Philharmoniker Recordings.

After an abortive first attempt on 11 May 2015, the orchestra on 21 June 2015 elected Kirill Petrenko as its next artistic director and chief conductor. In October 2015, the orchestra announced that Petrenko was to formally commence his contract as chief conductor with the 2019/20 season. A year after this news, in October 2016, the orchestra specified more precisely the start of Petrenko's tenure as 19 August 2019.

== Concert halls ==
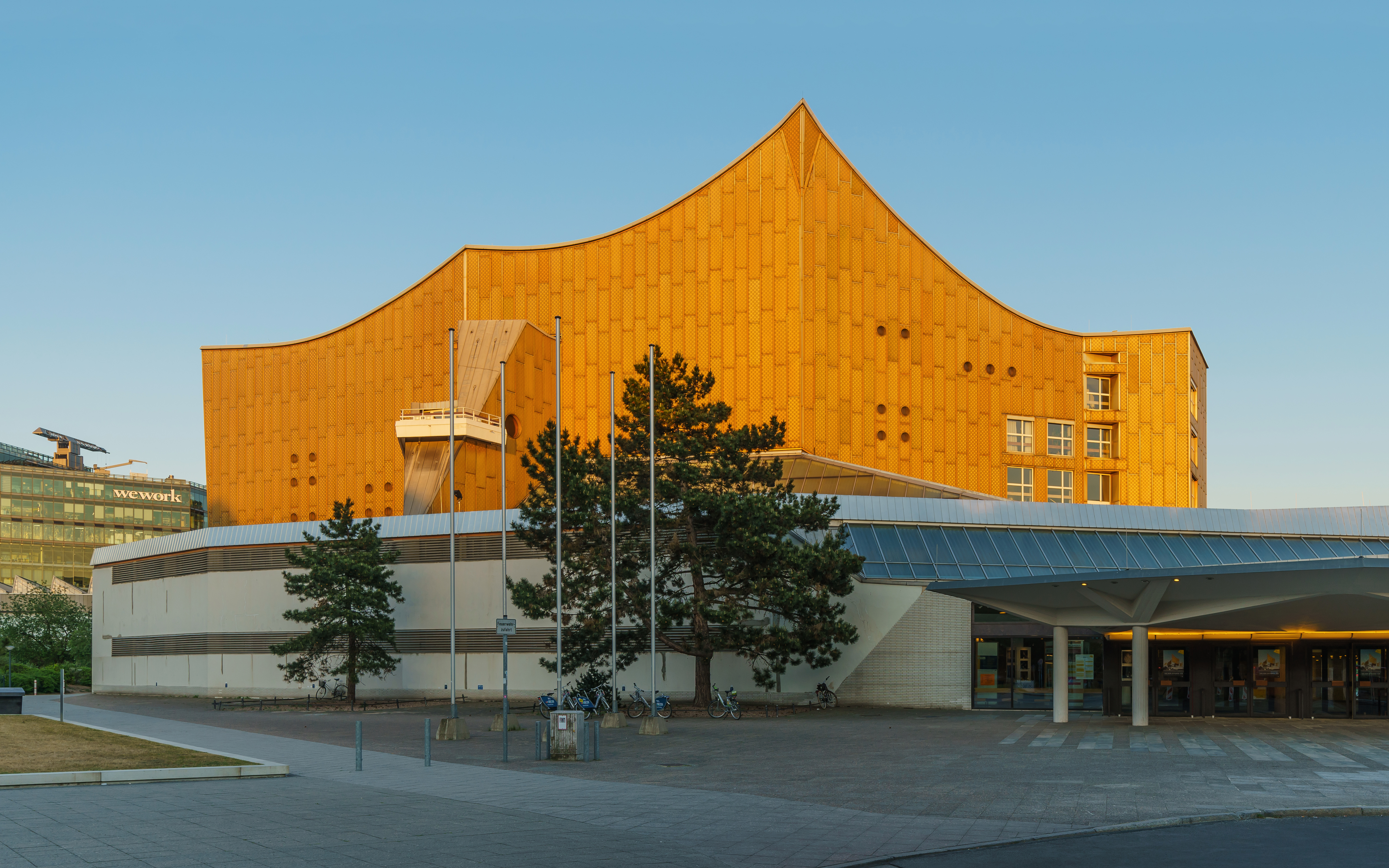
Berliner Philharmonie, home of the orchestra

The orchestra's first concert hall, the Philharmonie situated on the Bernburger Straße in Berlin Kreuzberg, was inaugurated in 1882 in a building previously used as a skating rink and converted by the architect Franz Schwechten. In 1899, a smaller concert hall, the Beethovensaal on Köthener Straße, was also inaugurated for chamber music and chamber ensembles. The first Philharmonie was used until British bombers destroyed it on 30 January 1944, the anniversary of Hitler becoming chancellor. The orchestra played until the end of the war in the Staatsoper, Unter den Linden. The Staatsoper was also destroyed on 3 February 1945. In need of a venue, the Berlin Philharmonic played during the years following the war in the Titania-Palast, an old movie theater converted in a concert hall, and still used the Beethovensaal for smaller concerts. During the 1950s the orchestra moved its concerts at the Musikhochschule (today part of the Berlin University of the Arts), in the Joseph-Joachim-Konzertsaal. However, most of the recordings were done at the Jesus-Christus-Kirche in Berlin Dahlem, celebrated for its acoustics.

The need for a new Philharmonie was expressed since 1949, when the Gesellschaft der Freunde der Berliner Philharmonie e.V. (Friends of the Berliner Philharmonie Society) was created to gather funds. The building of the new Philharmonie started in 1961, following the design of architect Hans Scharoun, and it was inaugurated on 15 October 1963, with a performance of Beethoven's Ninth Symphony, conducted by Herbert von Karajan. Its location made it part of the Kulturforum, and the great hall (2,440 seats) was then complemented by a chamber-music hall, the Kammermusiksaal (1,180 seats), built in 1987, following the design of architect Edgar Wisniewski, after a project by Hans Scharoun.

The Berliner Philharmonie has since been the home of the Berlin Philharmonic, and its symbol. The orchestra's logo is based on the pentagon-shape of the concert hall.

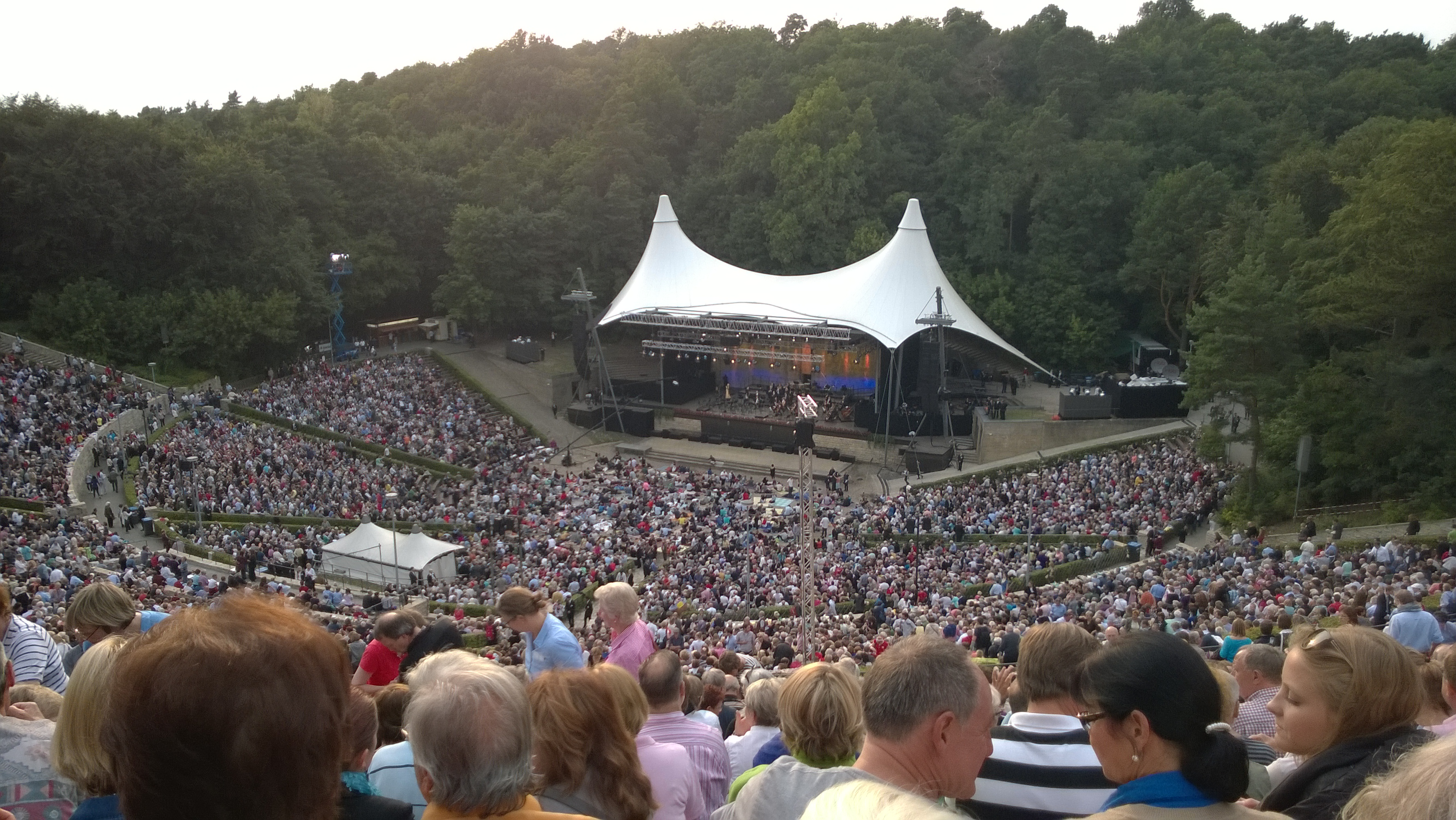
Waldbühne, site of an annual summer concert

On 20 May 2008, a fire broke out at the Philharmonie. One-quarter of the roof underwent considerable damage as firefighters cut openings to reach the flames beneath the roof. The hall interior also sustained water damage, but was otherwise "generally unharmed". The firefighters limited damage by the use of foam. The orchestra was restricted from use of the hall for concerts until June 2008.

On 18 December 2008, the orchestra announced the official creation of a Digital Concert Hall. This hitherto unique internet platform enables anyone with computer access across the world to see and hear the Philharmonic's concerts, whether live or on demand; not only under recent conductors, but even previous conductors, e.g. Claudio Abbado. Since July 2014, the Digital Concert Hall additionally offers livestreams produced from HD movies of concerts by Herbert von Karajan in the 1960s and early 1970s. Since 2010, selected concerts of the Berlin Philharmonic have been transmitted live to cinemas in Germany and Europe.

In 2026, the orchestra announced plans for a multi-year renovation of the Berliner Philharmonie, to commence in 2032, a development expected to displace the orchestra to alternative venues during that scheduled period.

== Principal conductors ==
- Ludwig von Brenner (1882–1887)
- Hans von Bülow (1887–1893)
- Richard Strauss (1894–1895)
- Arthur Nikisch (1895–1922)
- Wilhelm Furtwängler (1922–1945)
- Leo Borchard (May–August 1945)
- Sergiu Celibidache (1945–1952)
- Wilhelm Furtwängler (1952–1954)
- Herbert von Karajan (1954–1989)
- Claudio Abbado (1989–2002)
- Simon Rattle (2002–2018)
- Kirill Petrenko (2019–present)

== Honorary members ==
The orchestra conferred honorary membership to the conductors Daniel Barenboim (he is also the first and only honorary conductor), Bernard Haitink, Nikolaus Harnoncourt, Seiji Ozawa, Mariss Jansons, and Zubin Mehta.

== Composer in residence ==
- 1993–1994: György Kurtág
- 2016–2017: John Adams
- 2018–2019: George Benjamin
- 2022–2023: Esa-Pekka Salonen
- 2023–2024: Jörg Widmann
- 2024–2025: Wolfgang Rihm (posthum)
- 2026–2027: Brett Dean

== Artist-in-residence ==
- 2008–2009: Mitsuko Uchida
- 2013–2014: Christian Gerhaher
- 2014–2015: Christian Tetzlaff
- 2015–2016: Peter Sellars
- 2017–2018: Mark Padmore
- 2018–2019: Daniil Trifonov
- 2019–2020: Marlis Petersen
- 2020–2021: Tabea Zimmermann
- 2021–2022: Patricia Kopatchinskaja
- 2023–2024: Lisa Batiashvili
- 2024–2025: Seong-Jin Cho
- 2025–2026: Janine Jansen

== Awards and recognition ==
Classical BRIT Awards

- 2001 – "Ensemble/Orchestral Album of the Year" – Sir Simon Rattle, Mahler: Symphony No. 10 (EMI, 2000)
- 2003 – "Ensemble/Orchestral Album of the Year" – Sir Simon Rattle, Mahler: Symphony No. 5 (EMI, 2002)

Grand Prix du Disque Awards

- 1954 "Symphonic Music" – Beethoven Symphony No. 3 under Paul van Kempen (Philips)
- 1962 "Solo & Orchestra" – Dvořák Cello Concerto with Pierre Fournier under George Szell (DG)
- 1964 "Symphonic Music" – Beethoven 9 Symphonies under Herbert von Karajan (DG)
- 1965 "Symphnoic Music" – Brahms Four Symphonies under Herbert von Karajan (DG)
- 1965 "Solo & Orchestra" – Sibelius Violin Concerto with Christian Ferras under Karajan (DG)
- 1968 "Integral Recording" – Bruckner 9 Symphonies under Eugen Jochum (DG)
- 1968 "Classical Symphonic Music" – Schubert Symphony No. 5 under Karl Böhm (DG)
- 1968 "Modern Concerto" – Prokofiev Piano Concerto No. 3 & Ravel Piano Concerto with Martha Argerich under Claudio Abbado (DG)

- 1970 "Symphonic Music" – Mozart Symphonies 21–24 under Karl Böhm (DG)
- 1970 "Solo & Orchestra" – Beethoven Triple Concerto with David Oistrakh, Mstislav Rostropovich, Sviatoslav Richter under Herbert von Karajan (EMI)
- 1970 "Solo & Orchestra" – Dvořák Cello Concerto, Tchaikovsky Rococo Variations with Mstislav Rostropovitch under Herbert von Karajan (DG)
- 1979 "Solo & Orchestra" – Mozart Violin Concerts No. 3 & 5 with Anne-Sophie Mutter under Herbert von Karajan (DG)

Grammy Awards

- 1970 – Best Opera Recording – Herbert von Karajan, Helga Dernesch, Thomas Stolze, Jess Thomas, Wagner: Siegfried (DGG, 1969)
- 1979 – Best Orchestral Performance – Herbert von Karajan, Beethoven: Symphonies (9) (Complete)
- 1993 – Best Orchestral Recording – Leonard Bernstein, Mahler: Symphony No. 9 (DGG, 1992; recording 1979)
- 1995 – Best Chamber Music Performance – Daniel Barenboim, Dale Clevenger, Larry Combs, Daniele Damiano, Hansjörg Schellenberger, Beethoven/Mozart: Quintets (Chicago – Berlin) (1994)
- 1998 – Best Small Ensemble Performance – Claudio Abbado, Hindemith Kammermusik No. 1 mit Finale 1921, Op. 24 No. 1 (with members of Berlin Philharmonic Orchestra) (EMI, 1996)
- 2000 – Best Classical Vocal Performance – Claudio Abbado, Anne Sofie von Otter, Thomas Quasthoff: Mahler: Des Knaben Wunderhorn (DGG, 1999)
- 2001 – Best Orchestral Performance – Sir Simon Rattle, Mahler: Symphony No. 10 (EMI, 2000)
- 2007 – Best Instrumental Soloist(s) Performance (with orchestra) – Antonio Pappano, Leif Ove Andsnes: Rachmaninov, Piano Concertos 1 and 2 (EMI, 2006)

Gramophone Awards

- 1981 – "Opera Recording of the Year" – Herbert von Karajan, Wagner: Parsifal (DGG, 1980)
- 1981 – "Orchestral Record of the Year" – Herbert von Karajan, Mahler: Symphony No. 9 (DGG, 1980)
- 1984 – "Record of the Year" – Herbert von Karajan, Mahler: Symphony No. 9 (DGG, 1984; live recording 1982)
- 2000 – "Orchestral Record of the Year" – Sir Simon Rattle, Mahler: Symphony No. 10 (EMI, 2000)
- 2004 – "Concerto" – Mariss Jansons, Leif Ove Andsnes, Grieg: Piano Concerto and Schumann: Piano Concerto (EMI, 2004)
- 2006 – "Record of the Year" – Claudio Abbado, Mahler: Symphony No. 6 (DGG, 2005)

ECHO (formerly Deutscher Schallplattenpreis) of Deutsche Phono-Akademie

- 2003 – Chorwerkeinspielung – Sir Simon Rattle, Rundfunkchor Berlin, MDR Rundfunkchor, Ernst-Senff-Chor Berlin, Karita Mattila, Anne Sofie von Otter, Thomas Moser, Philip Langridge, Thomas Quasthoff: Schoenberg, Gurre-Lieder (EMI, 2002)
- 2006 – Musik-DVD Produktion des Jahres – Sir Simon Rattle, Thomas Grube and Enrique Sánchez Lansch (director), Uwe Dierks (producer): Rhythm Is It! (2005)
- 2006 – Sinfonische Einspielung – Claudio Abbado: Mahler, Symphony No. 6 (DGG, 2005)
- 2016 – Orchester/Ensemble – Jean Sibelius, Symphonies 1–7, (Berliner Philharmoniker Recordings, 2015)

ICMA (International Classical Music Awards)

- 2016 – "Symphonic" – Sir Simon Rattle: Jean Sibelius, Symphonies 1–7 (Berliner Philharmoniker Recordings, 2015)
- 2017 – "Symphonic" – Claudio Abbado: The Last Concert (Berliner Philharmoniker Recordings, 2016)

Timbre de Platine (Platinum Stamp) awarded by Opéra International magazine

- 1987 – Riccardo Muti, Mozart: Requiem (EMI, 1987)

Diapason magazine

- 2014 – Diapason D'Or de l'année 2014 – Sir Simon Rattle: Johann Sebastian Bach, St Matthew Passion (Berliner Philharmoniker Recordings, 2014)
- 2015 – Diapason D'Or Arte – Nikolaus Harnoncourt: Franz Schubert (Berliner Philharmoniker Recordings, 2015)
- 2015 – Diapason D'Or Arte – Sir Simon Rattle: Johann Sebastian Bach, St John Passion (Berliner Philharmoniker Recordings, 2014)
- 2016 – Diapason D'Or de l'année 2016 – Sir Simon Rattle: Ludwig van Beethoven, Symphonies 1–9 (Berliner Philharmoniker Recordings, 2016)

== See also ==
- Philharmonia Quartet Berlin
- The 12 Cellists of the Berlin Philharmonic
- Scharoun Ensemble
- Category:Music commissioned by the Berlin Philharmonic (13)
