= Jan Kochanowski Park =

Urban park, 20th century, Bydgoszcz, Poland

Coordinates: 53°07′47″N 18°00′42″E

- Polish: Park Jana Kochanowskiego w Bydgoszczy
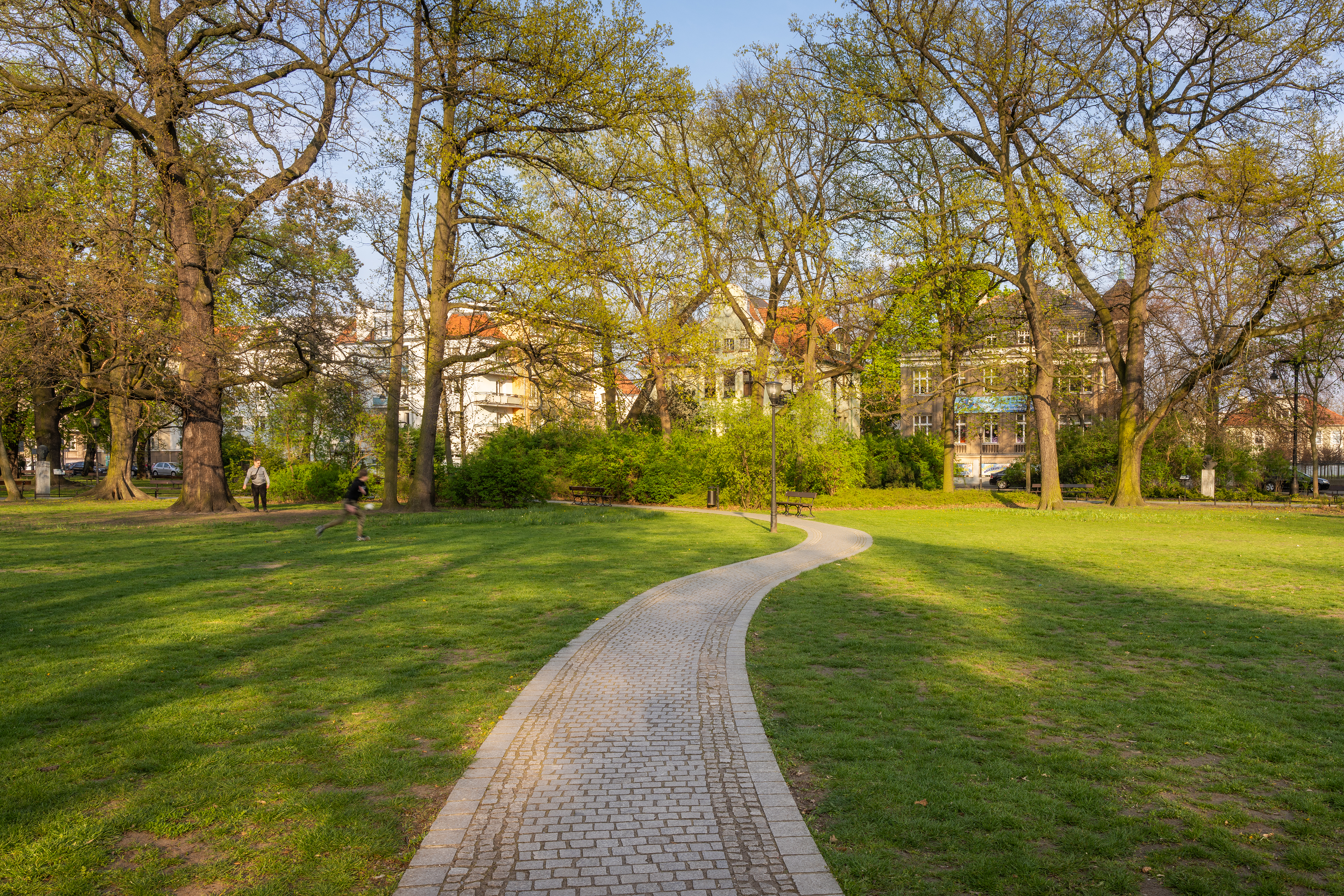
- Jan Kochanowski Park
- Interactive map of Jan Kochanowski Park
- Location: Bydgoszcz, Poland
- Area: 3.15 hectares (31,500 m^{2})
- Elevation: 50 metres (160 ft)
- Created: 1901
- Designer: Konrad Neumann
- Owner: City of Bydgoszcz

Jan Kochanowski Park is a green area covering 3,15 ha, located in downtown Bydgoszcz, Poland. It is part of the "Music district in Bydgoszcz" (Polish: Dzielnica muzyczna w Bydgoszczy) and is named after the Polish renaissance poet, Jan Kochanowski.

== Location ==
The park is located in an area urbanized at the beginning of the 20th century. The park is rectangular, with dimensions 120 × 250 m, and is delineated by the following avenues:

- 20 Stycznia 1920 Street;
- Adam Mickiewicz Alley;
- Ignacego Paderewskiego street;
- Słowackiego street.

Due to the proximity of several musical institutions (Pomeranian Philharmonic, Polish Theatre in Bydgoszcz, Bydgoszcz Music Academy, Music Schools Group), as well as the outdoor gallery of monuments of composers and virtuoso, the park and its surroundings are called Music district in Bydgoszcz.

== History ==
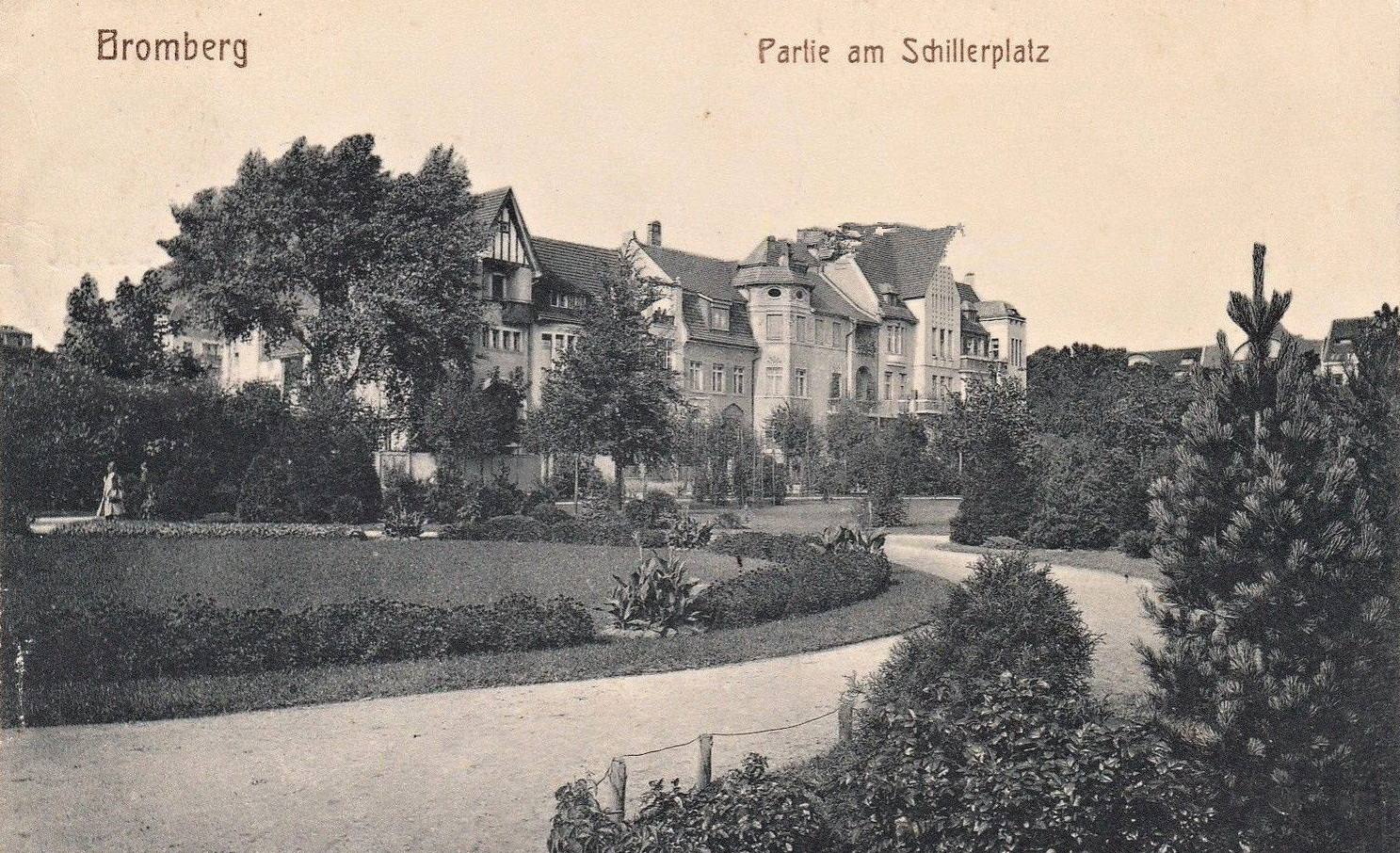
Park in 1913

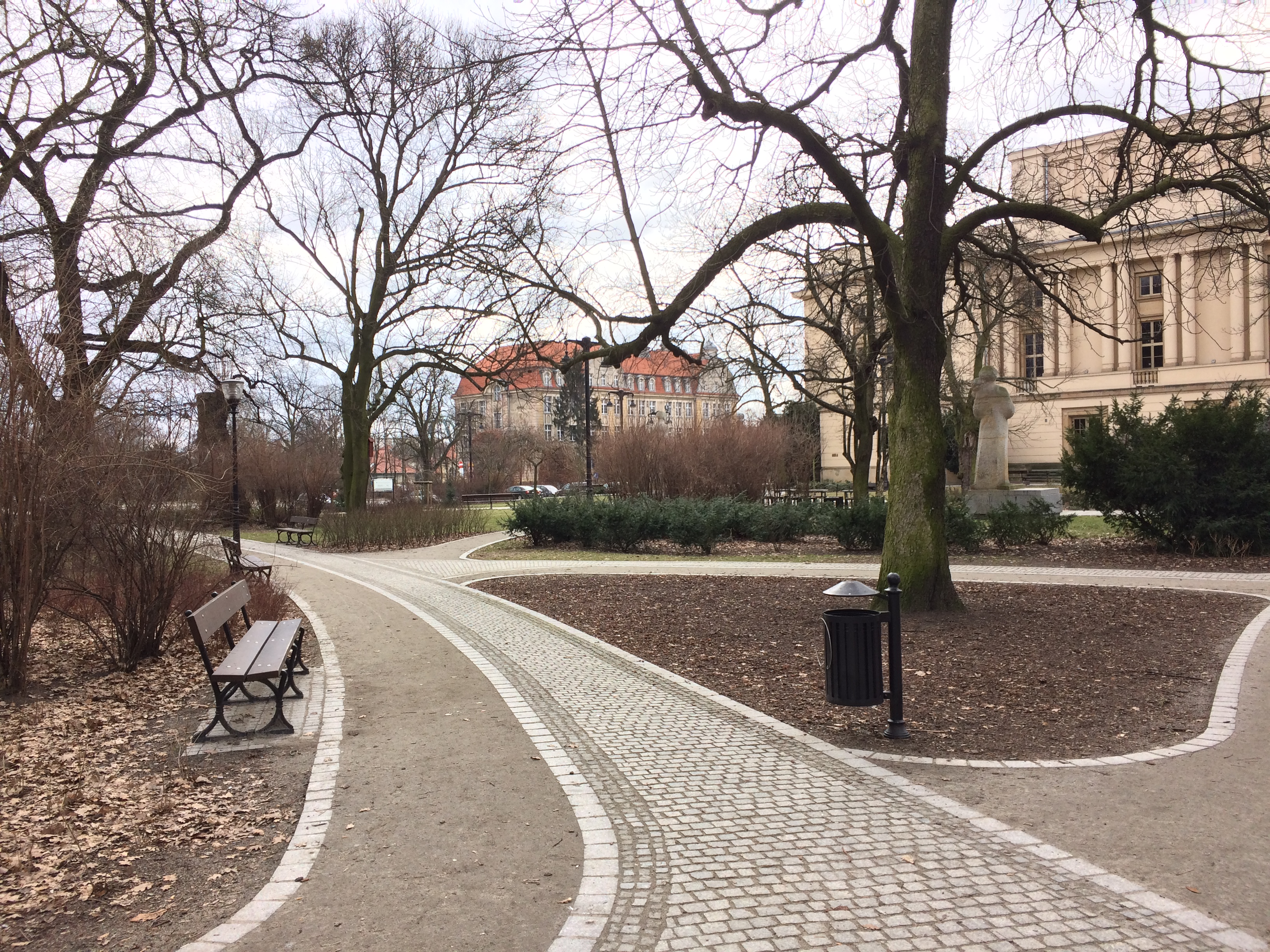
Backdrop:Pomeranian Philharmonic and High School Nr.6

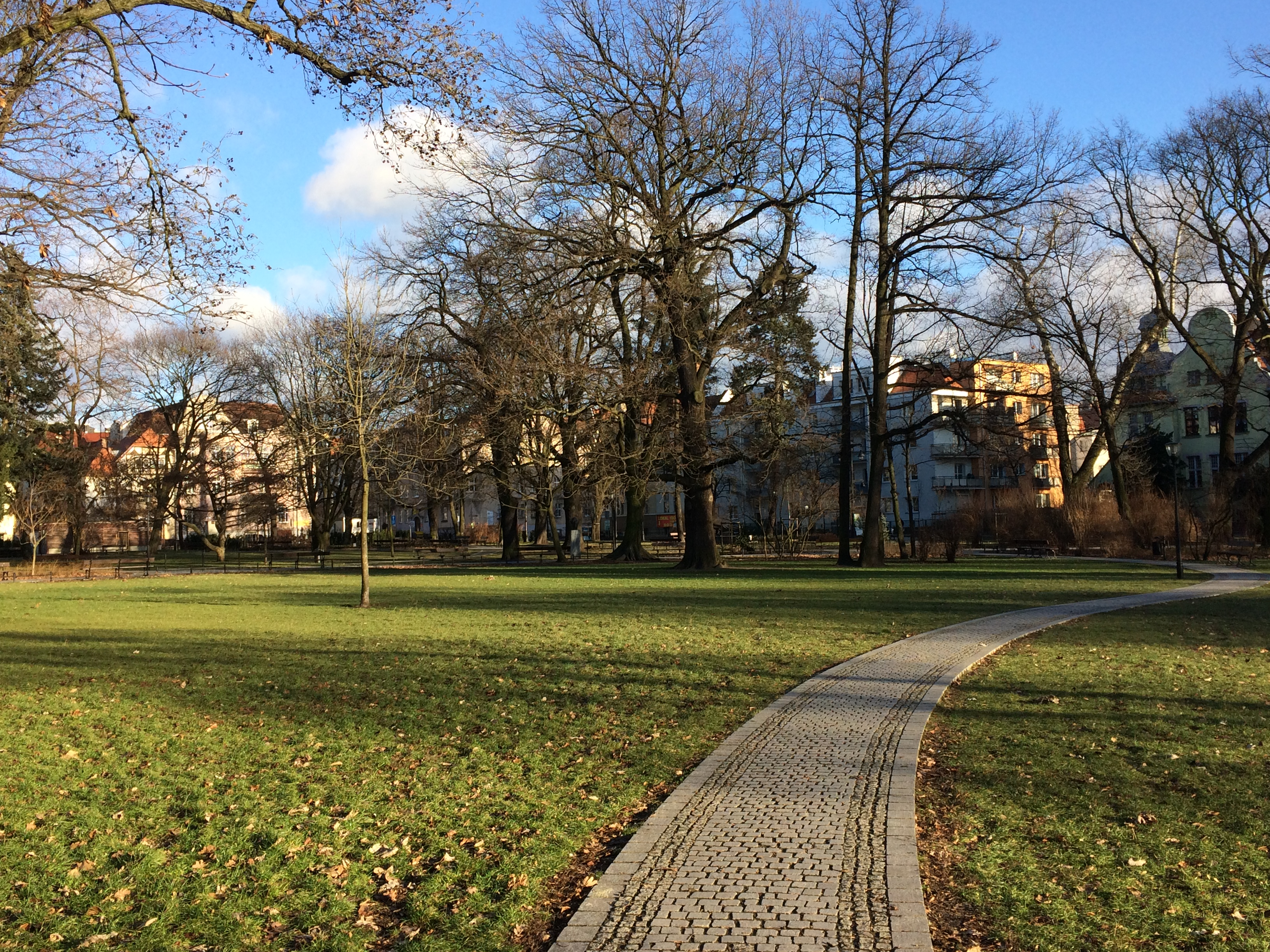
View with Paderewskiego street

The park has been designed by Konrad Neumann, then director of the Municipal gardens of Bromberg in 1901; its initial surface was 2.8 hectares (28,000 m^{2}). It was part of urban plans laid out in 1903, and developed through 1911 The design was inspired from English gardens, with about 80 species of trees and ornamental trees, mainly endemical native species. The main entrance was located at Bismark Platz, today at the junction between Słowackiego and January 20, 1920, streets. The northern edge on Bulöw Straße (Adam Mickiewicz Alley) was a lawn planted with roses and low shrubs.

In January 1920, Bydgoszcz joined the re-created state of Poland. On July 31, 1927, a ceremony unveiled in the park the monument to Henryk Sienkiewicz, first of its kind in the country.

In 1938, a survey in registered 84 species of trees and shrubs including: white birch, common hawthorn, alders, sweet chestnuts, silver berry, common salt trees, walnut trees, magnolias, jasmines, poplars, silver poplars, cherry trees, English oaks, robinias, sumacs, elder berries, willows, lime trees, elms, balsam trees, firs, white firs, sawara cypresses, Norway spruces, blue spruces, mountain pines, pine trees, Swiss pines, English yews, ashleaf maples, ailanthus, sycamores, Norway maples, field maples, silver maples, horse-chestnuts, horse-chestnuts, beeches, European beeches, hornbeams and European hornbeams.

In particular, the park boasted elms and poplars 25 meters tall high and oaks with 300 to 480 cm circumference trunks.

After World War II and the destruction of part of the trees, new plantings have been carried out in the post-war years. In 1952, during the construction of the Pomeranian Philharmonic hall, four 400 cm-perimeter oaks were cut down. In 1958, the southern limit of the park has been extended to include the area of the Philharmonic. In 1960, in the northern part of the park, the statue The Archer, one of Bydgoszcz icons, was installed to a dedicated rectangular square.

In 2014, an overhaul of Jan Kochanowski Park has been performed, to highlight its historical character and link it with the Music District. This works included:

- Removing asphalt alleys from the 1960s;
- New species (Douglas firs, berberis, Sea buckthorn, lychee tree) were introduced as in Konrad Neumann's original project in 1901;
- Set up of flower beds of annual plants;
- A new flower display for The Archer;
- A children's playground equipped with outdoor musical instruments (drum, tubular bells and xylophone);
- New lighting and monitoring system installed.

Renovation costed 4.8 million Polish złoty. The newly refurbished park was open on August 13, 2015

The re-construction of the park happened at the same time as the re-building of the new "son et lumière fountain" before the Pomeranian Philharmonic building, launched on May 23, 2014).

Since its creation, the park bore the following names:

- From 1901 to 1920, and from 1939 to 1945 – Bismark Garten;
- From 1920 to 1939, and since 1945 – Park im. Jana Kochanowskiego.

Park namesake is Jan Kochanowski (1530–1584), a famous Polish Renaissance poet.

== Monuments ==
Jan Kochanowski park stands out among other city green areas as welcoming a large number of monuments.

First one, Henryk Sienkiewicz monument by Konstanty Laszczka, was unveiled in 1927, in presence of thousands of spectators, officials and the president of Poland Ignacy Mościcki. The memorial was destroyed by Nazis in September 1939, a new statue has been realized in May 1968, by Stanisław Horno-Popławski.

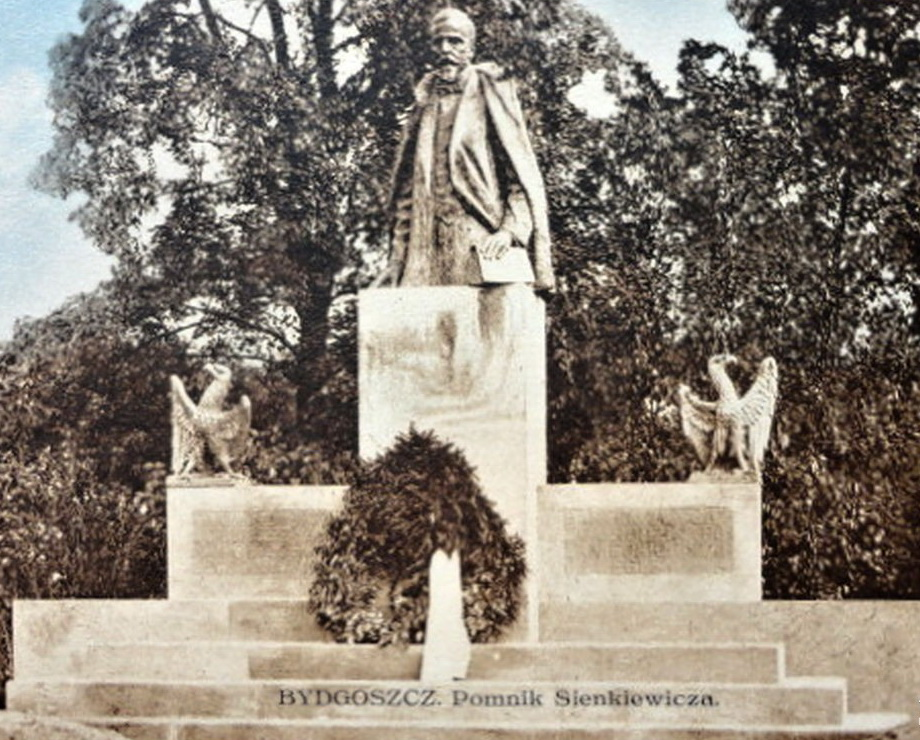
Original monument by Konstanty Laszczka ca 1933

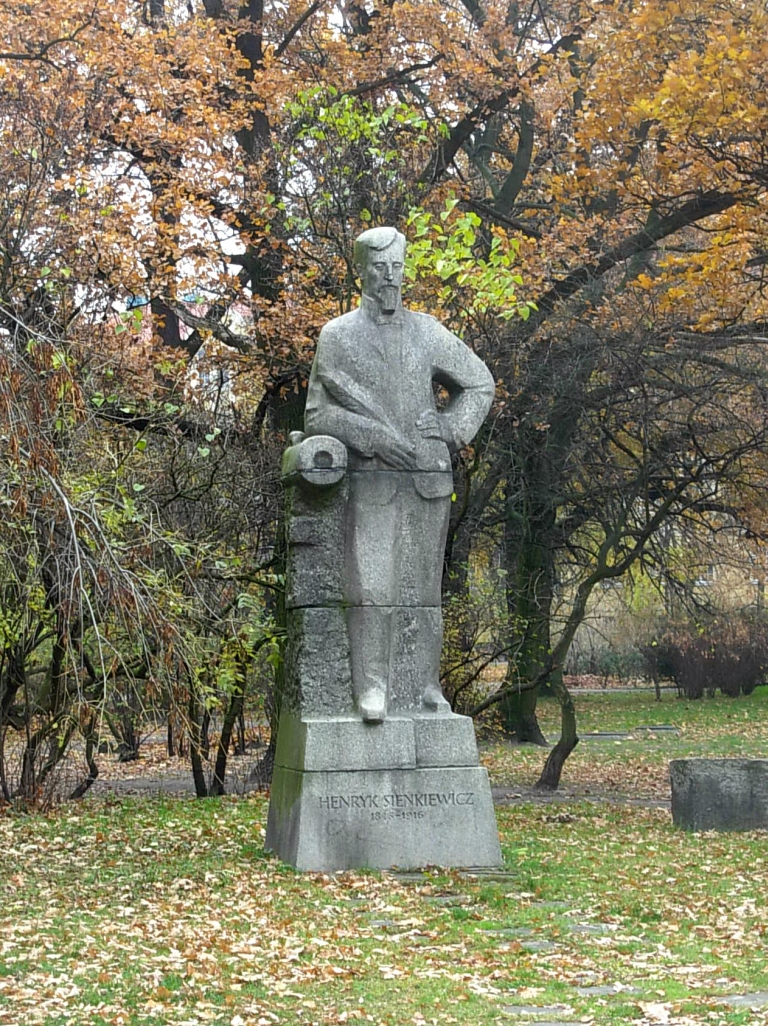
Henryk Sienkiewicz by Stanisław Horno-Popławski

Since 1960, The Archer, realized in 1910 by Ferdinand Lepcke, has moved to Jan Kochanowski Park. It is one of the most valuable public sculpture in Bydgoszcz and considered as a real symbol of the city.

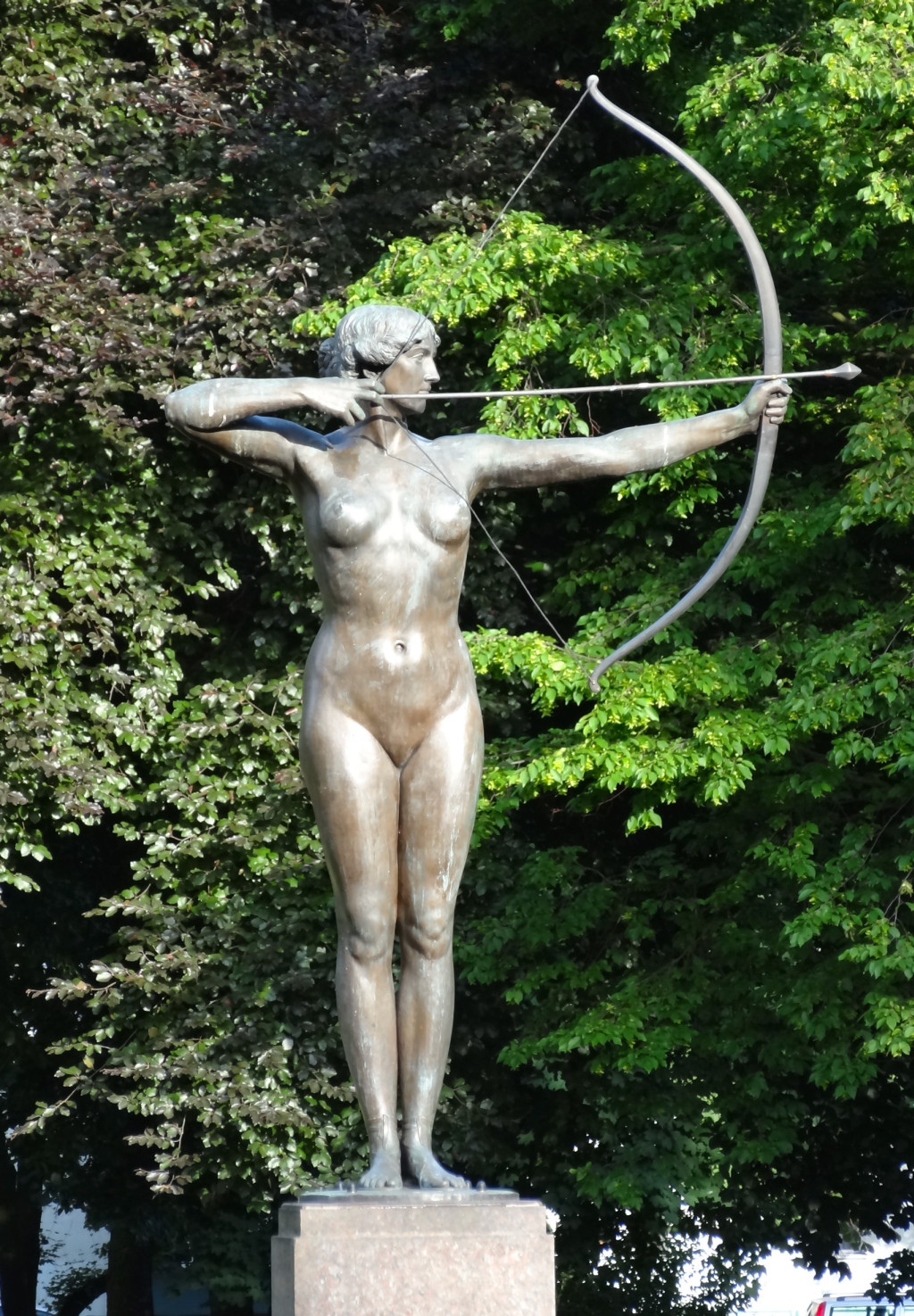
The Archer

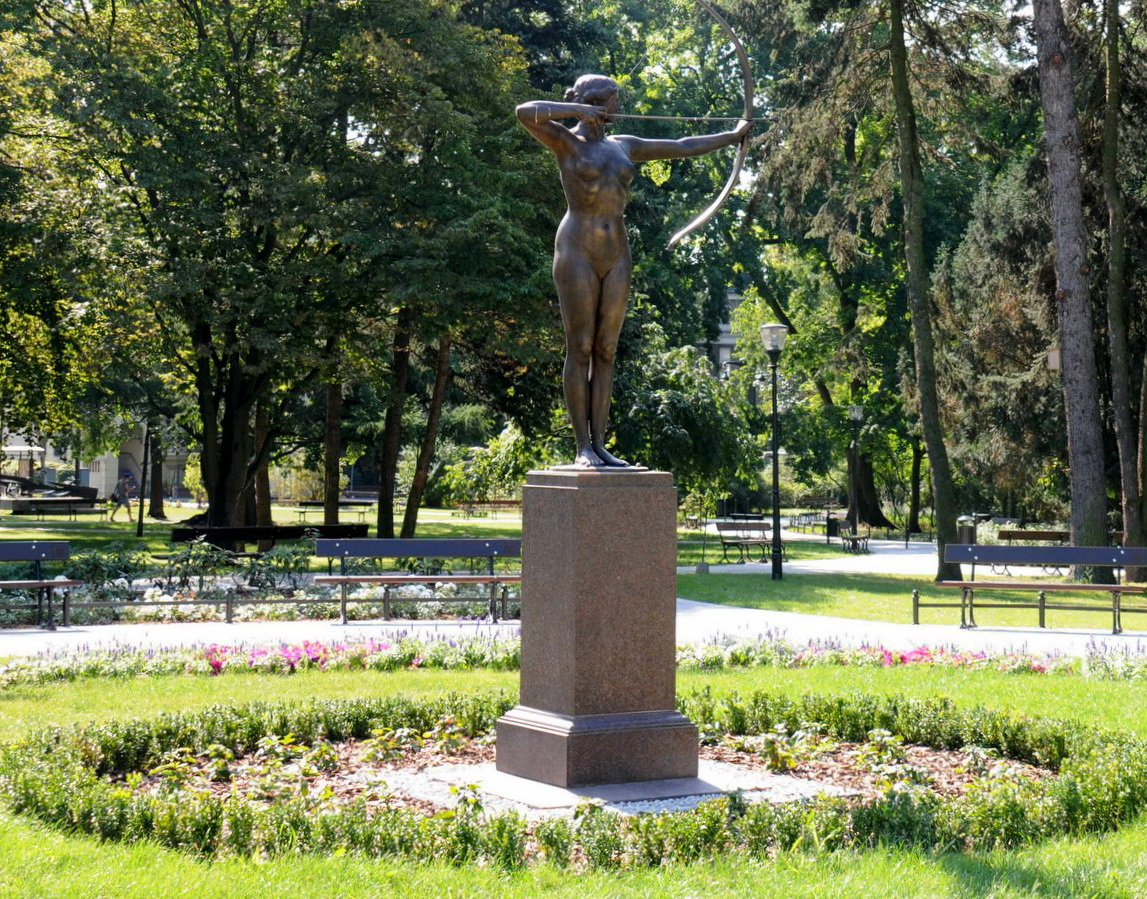
The Archer after park renovation

In 1970, a monument portraying a broken rose, designed by Józef Makowski, was set up in the park. It commemorates the death of fifty pupils from the High School for boys, killed by Nazis on September 5, 1939.

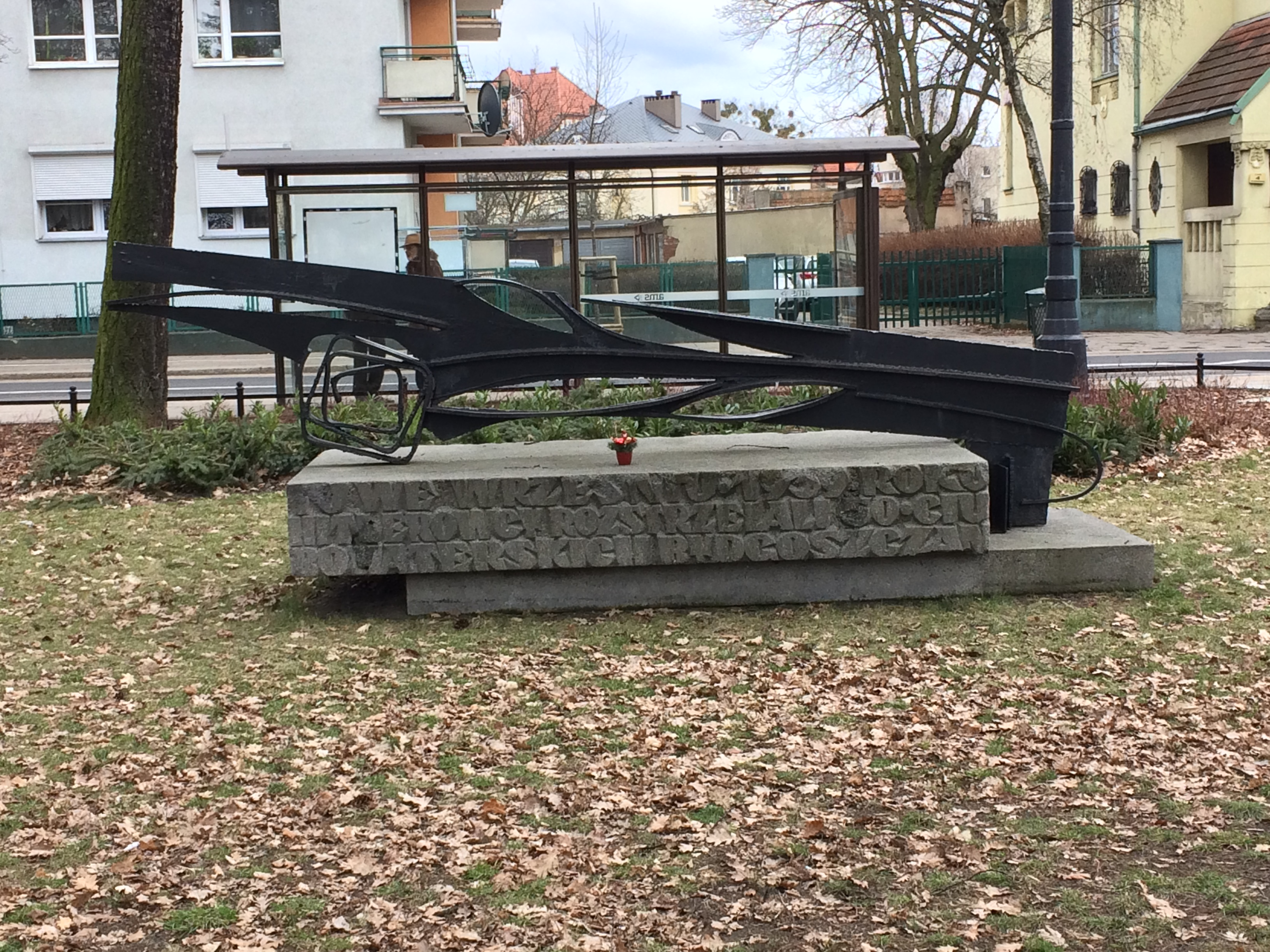
The monument by Józef Makowski

In 2007, the statue by Michał Kubiak of Andrzej Schwalbe (1923–2002), first director of the Pomeranian Philharmonic is present on the square facing the building.

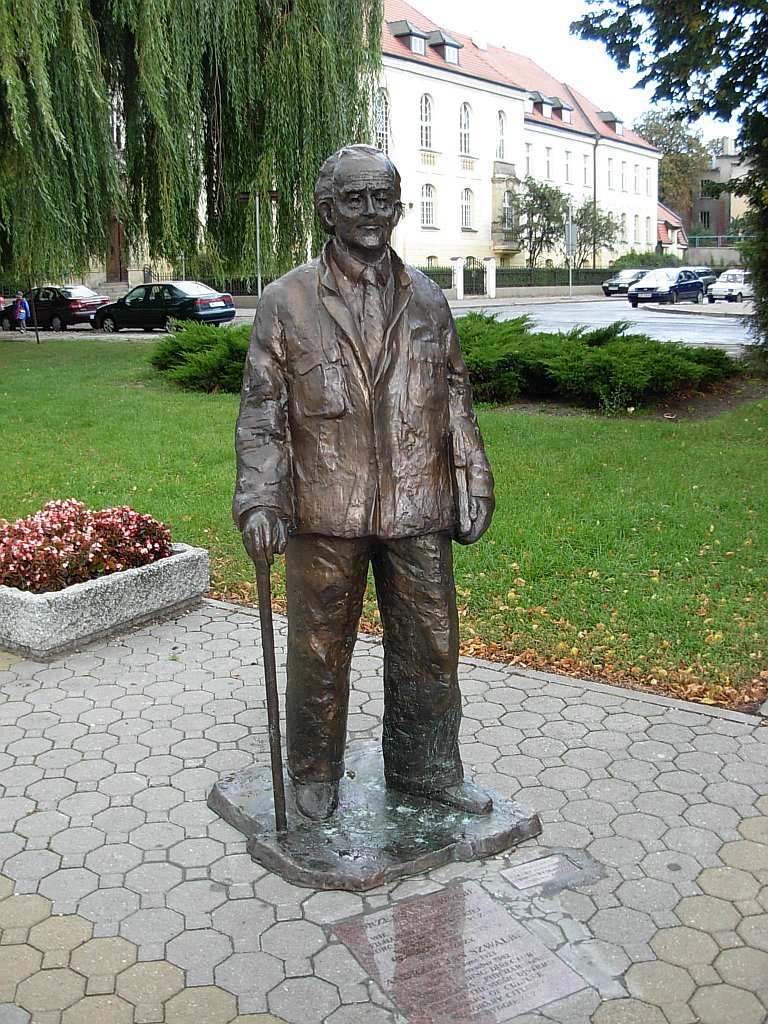
The monument, with Music Schools building in the backdrop

=== Outdoor gallery ===
In addition, the park hosts an outdoor collection of sculptures of outstanding personages of classical music.

It features 16 monuments (10 statues and 6 busts) of composers and virtuoso musicians, and placed here progressively since the early 1970s:

- Frédéric Chopin (1810–1849), statue in stone by Józef Makowski;
- Ignacy Jan Paderewski (1860–1941), Statue in stone by Józef Makowski;
- Henryk Wieniawski (1835–1880), statue in stone by Ewelina & Henryk Szczech-Siwicka from Toruń;
- Karol Szymanowski (1882–1937), statue in stone by Ewelina & Henryk Szczech-Siwicka;
- Karol Kurpiński (1785–1857), statue in bronze by Ewelina & Henryk Szczech-Siwicka;
- Stanisław Moniuszko (1819–1872), statue in stone by Witold Marciniak from Toruń;
- Grażyna Bacewicz (1913–1969), statue in stone by Ewelina & Henryk Szczech-Siwicka;
- Mieczysław Karłowicz (1876–1909), statue in stone by Henryk Rasmus;
- Pyotr Ilyich Tchaikovsky (1840–1893), statue in bronze by Ewelina & Henryk Szczech-Siwicka;
- Ludwig van Beethoven (1770–1827), statue in bronze by Witold Marciniak;
- Antonín Dvořák (1841–1904), bust in bronze by Witold Marciniak;
- Ludomir Różycki (1884–1953), bust in bronze by Mieczysław Welter from Warsaw;
- Igor Stravinsky (1882–1971), bust in bronze by Barbara Zbrożyna from Warsaw;
- Johann Sebastian Bach (1685–1750), bust in bronze by Witold Marciniak;
- Claude Debussy (1862–1918), bust in bronze by Andrzej Kasten from Warsaw;
- Henryk Mikołaj Górecki (1933–2010), bust in bronze by Ryszard Wojciechowski.
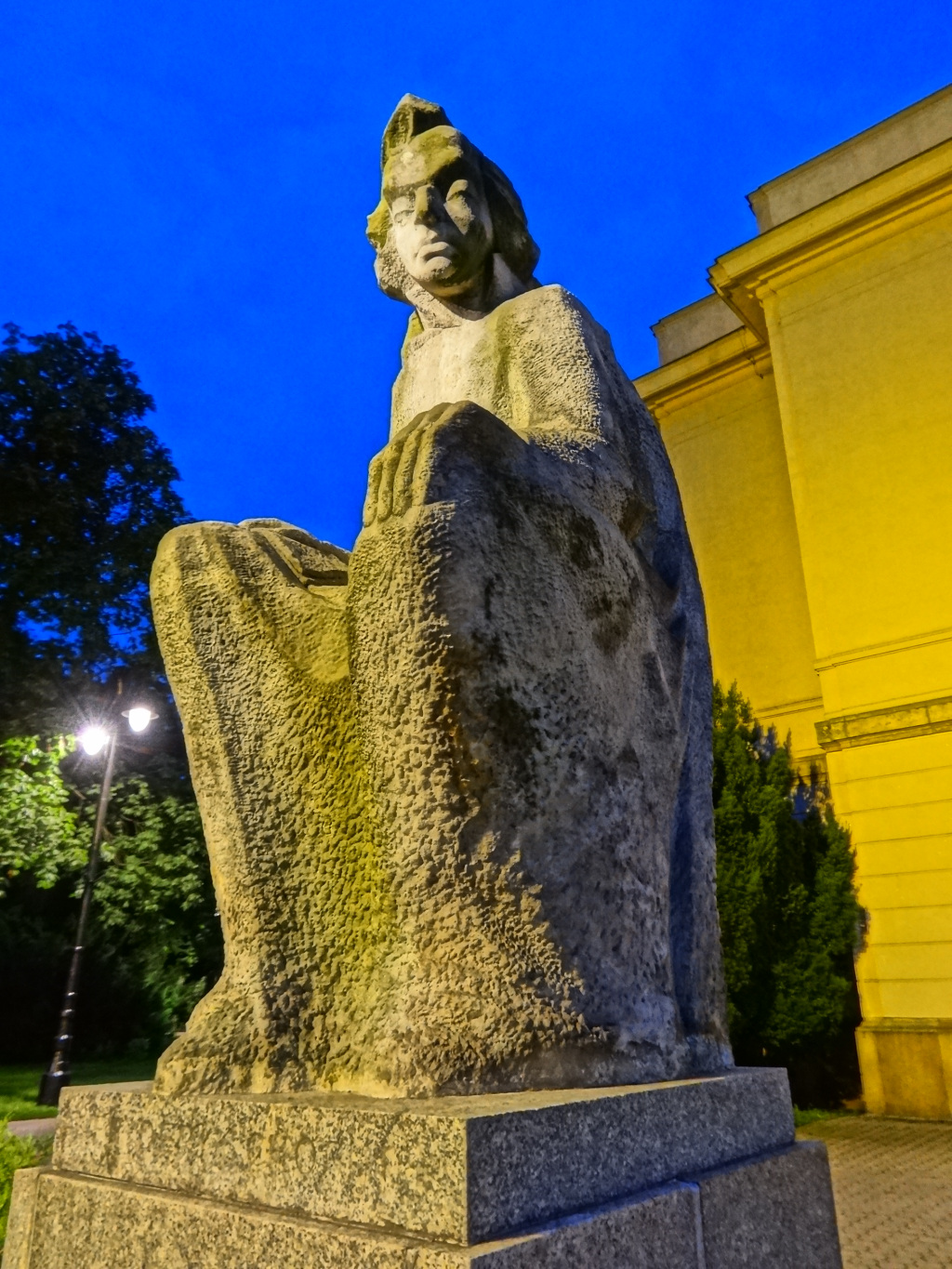
Chopin, Józef Makowski

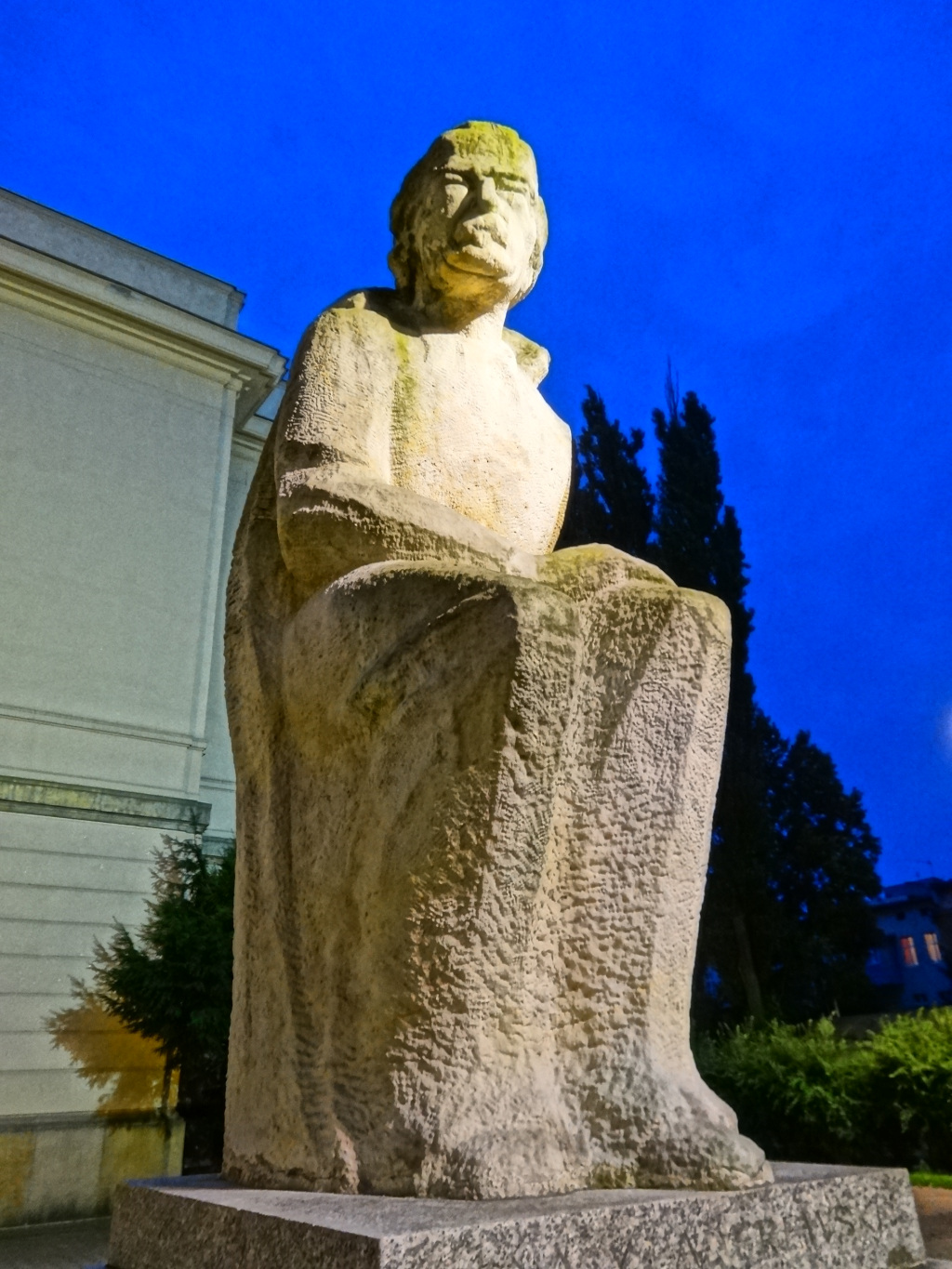
Paderewski, Józef Makowski

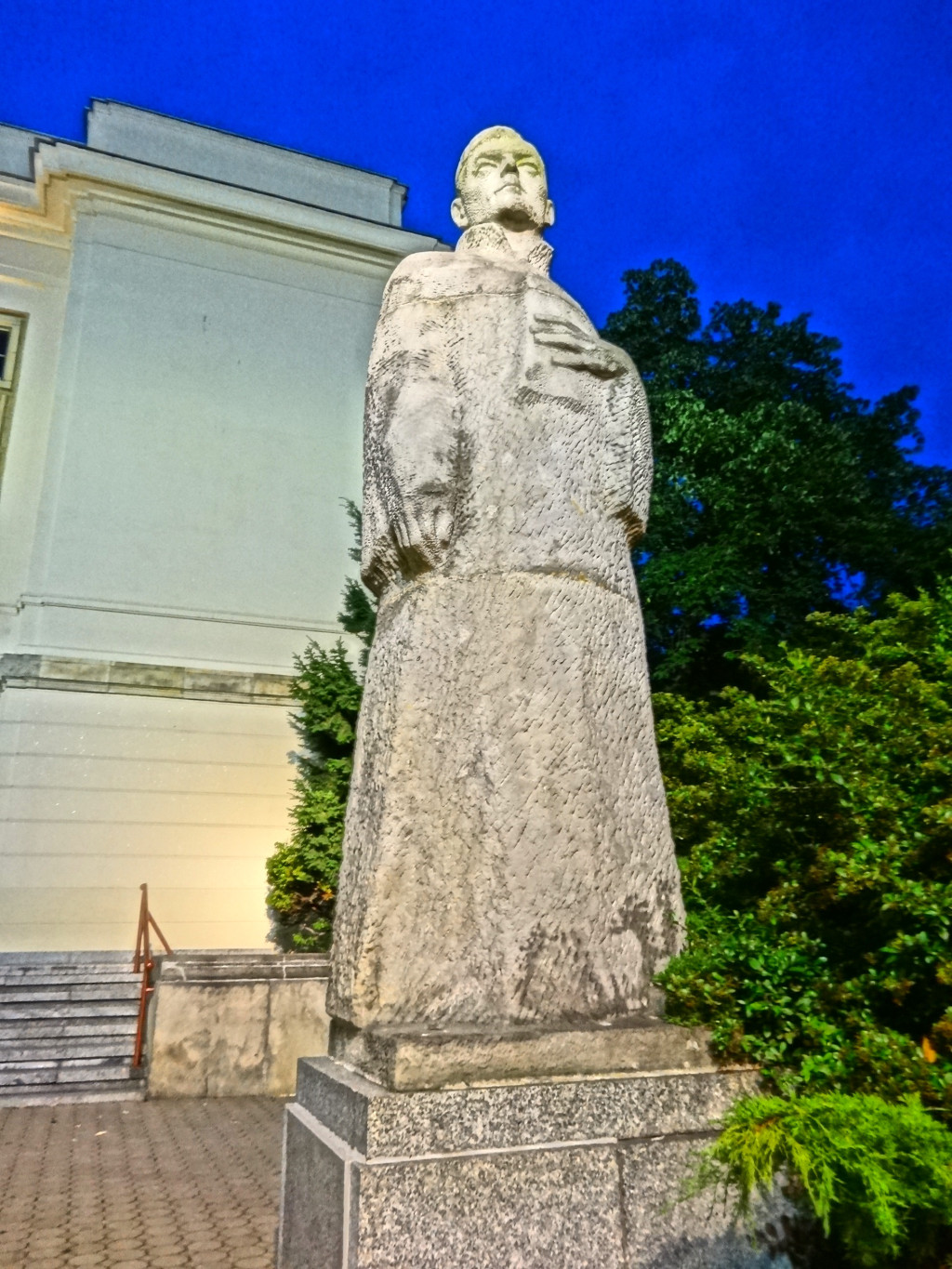
Szymanowski, Ewelina & Henryk Szczech-Siwicka

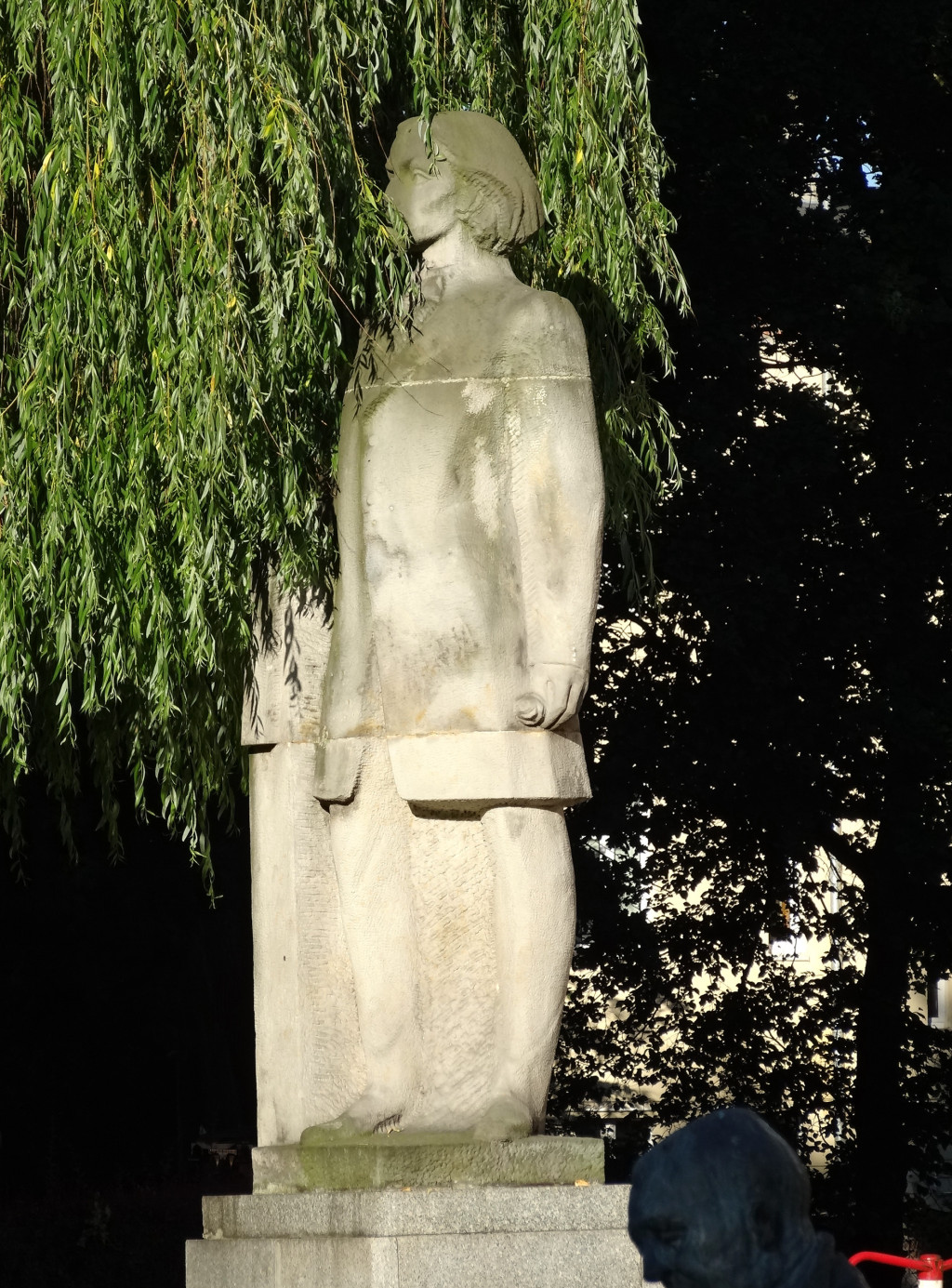
Wieniawski, Ewelina & Henryk Szczech-Siwicka

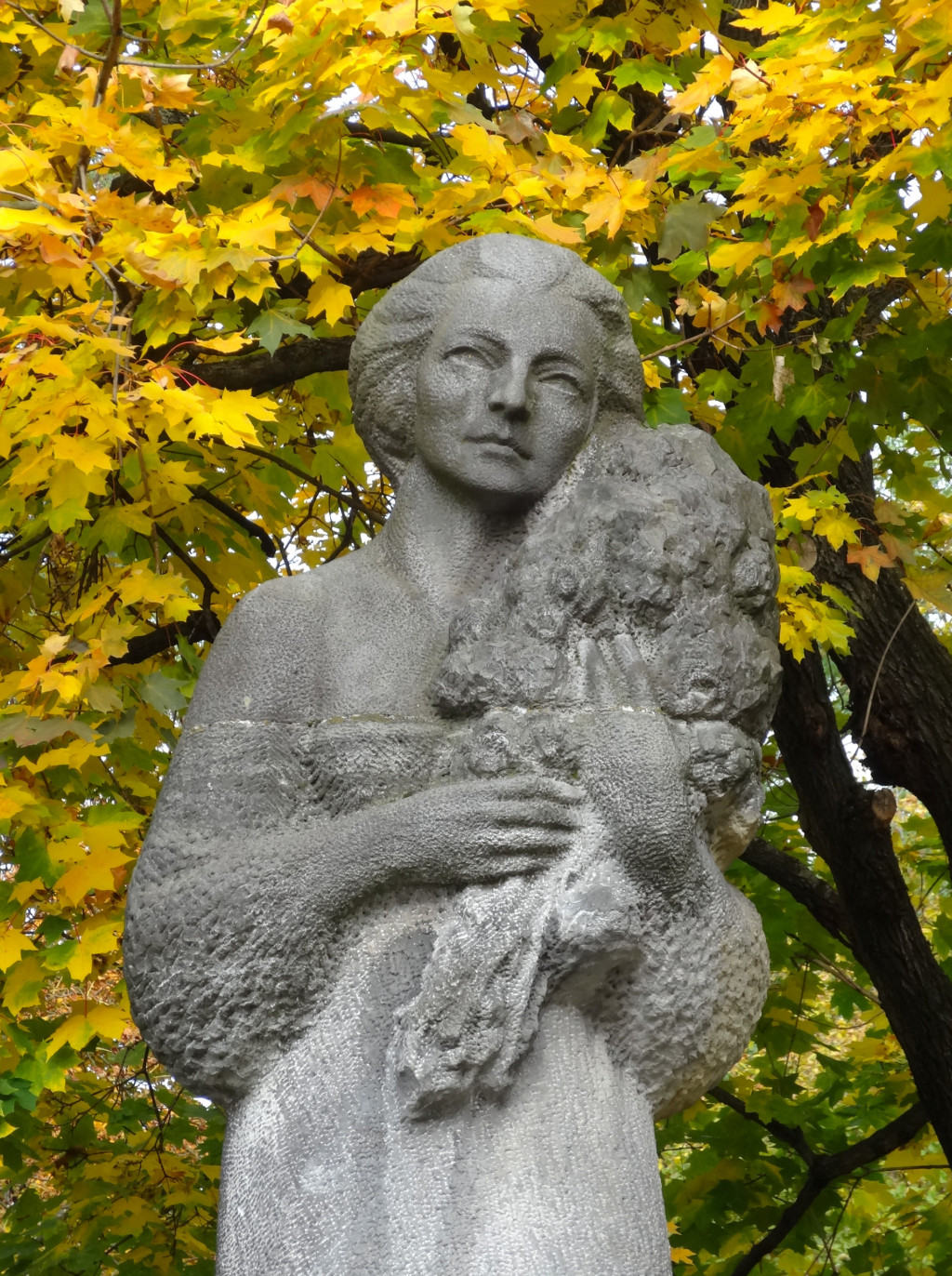
Bacewicz, Ewelina & Henryk Szczech-Siwicka

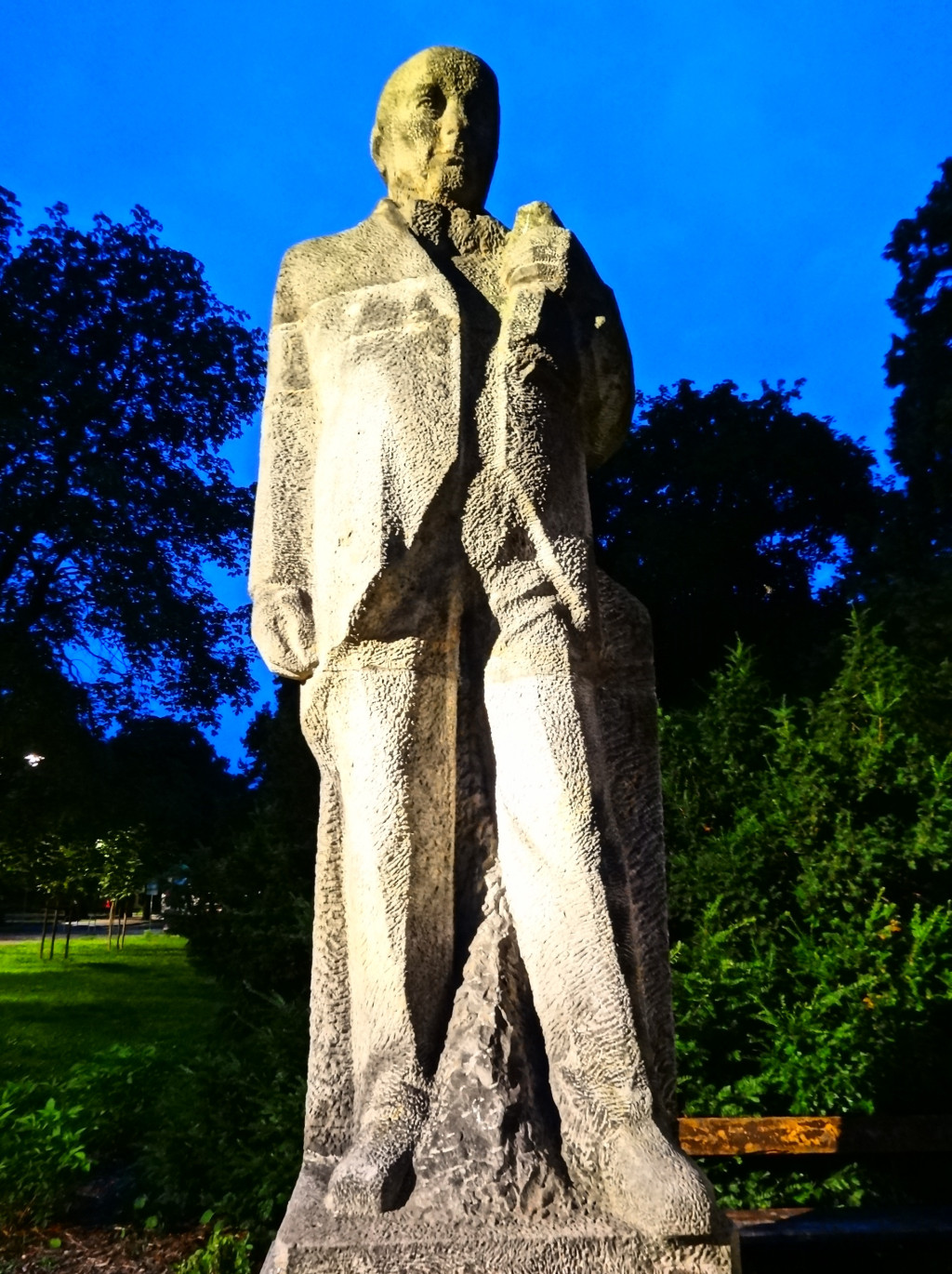
Moniuszko, Witold Marciniak

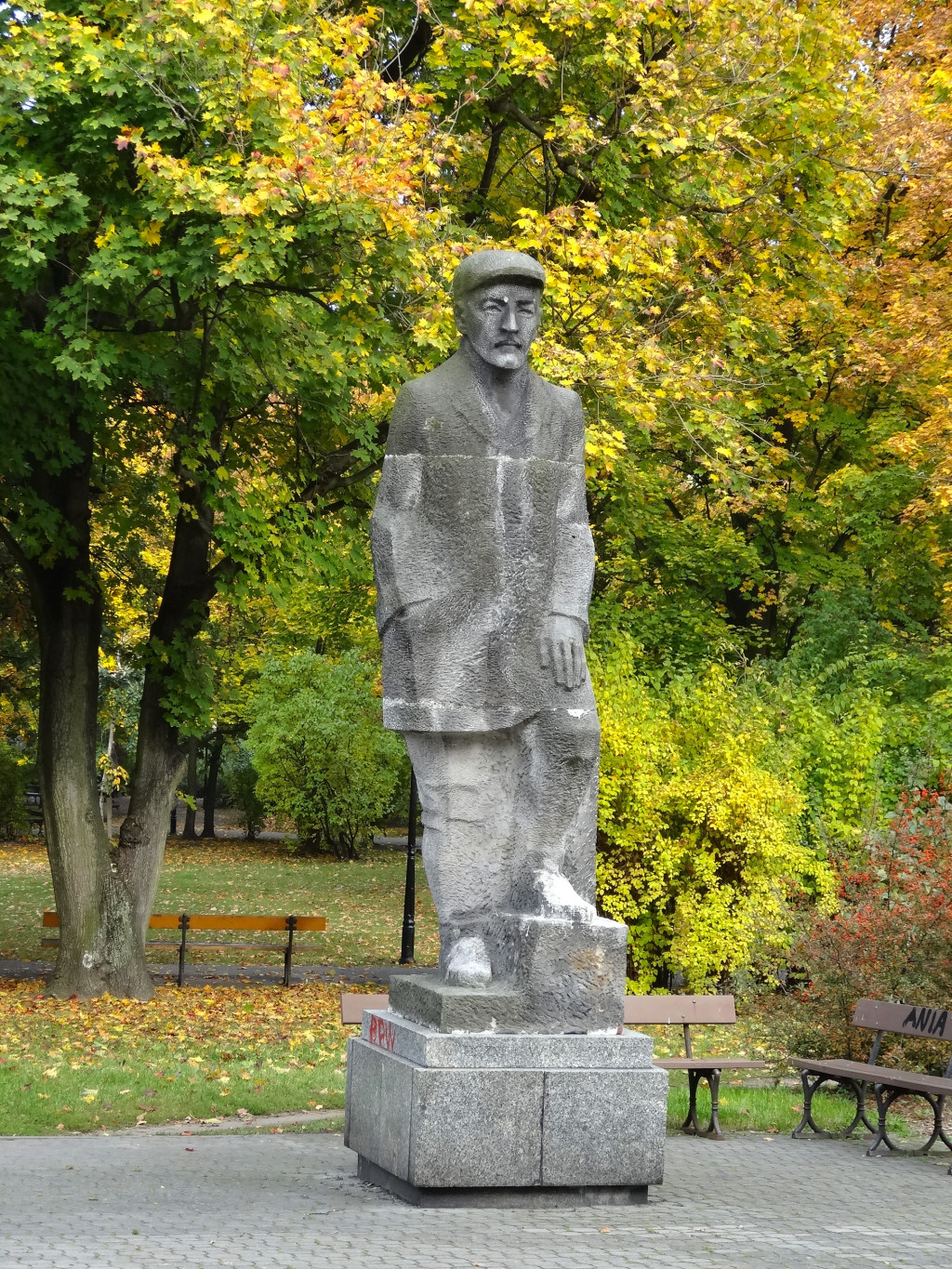
Karłowicz, Henryk Rasmus

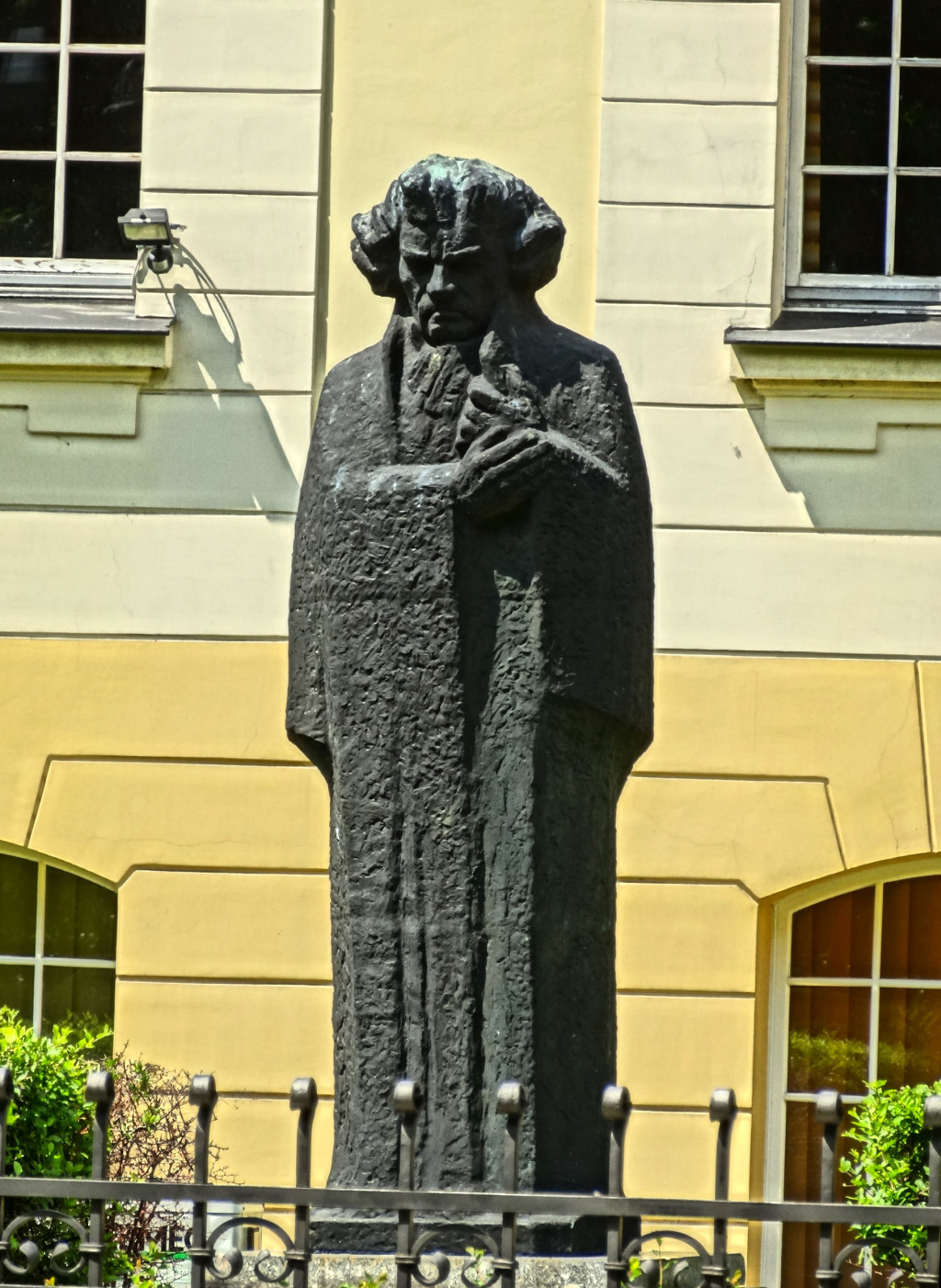
Beethoven, Witold Marciniak

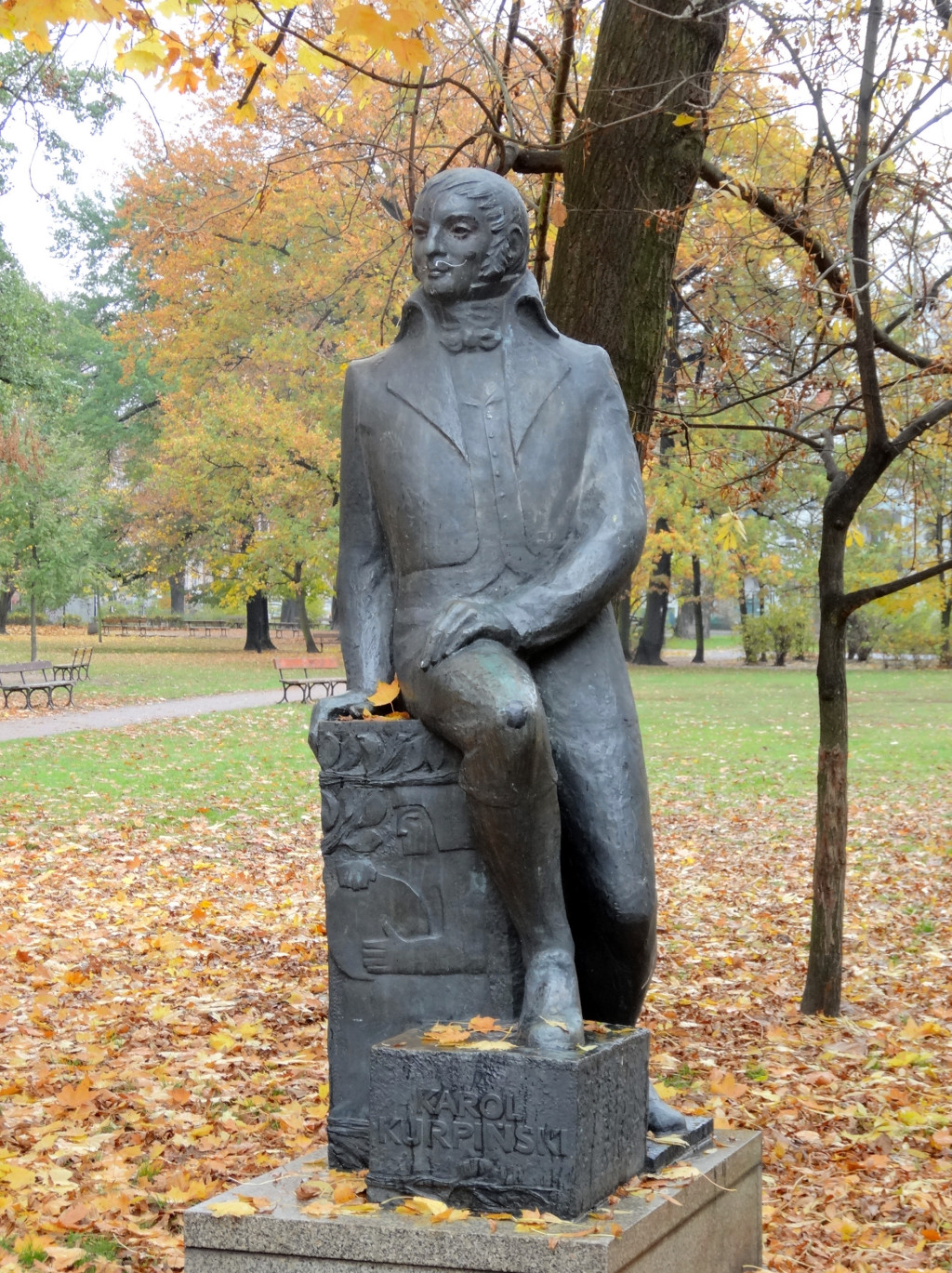
Kurpiński, Ewelina & Henryk Szczech-Siwicka

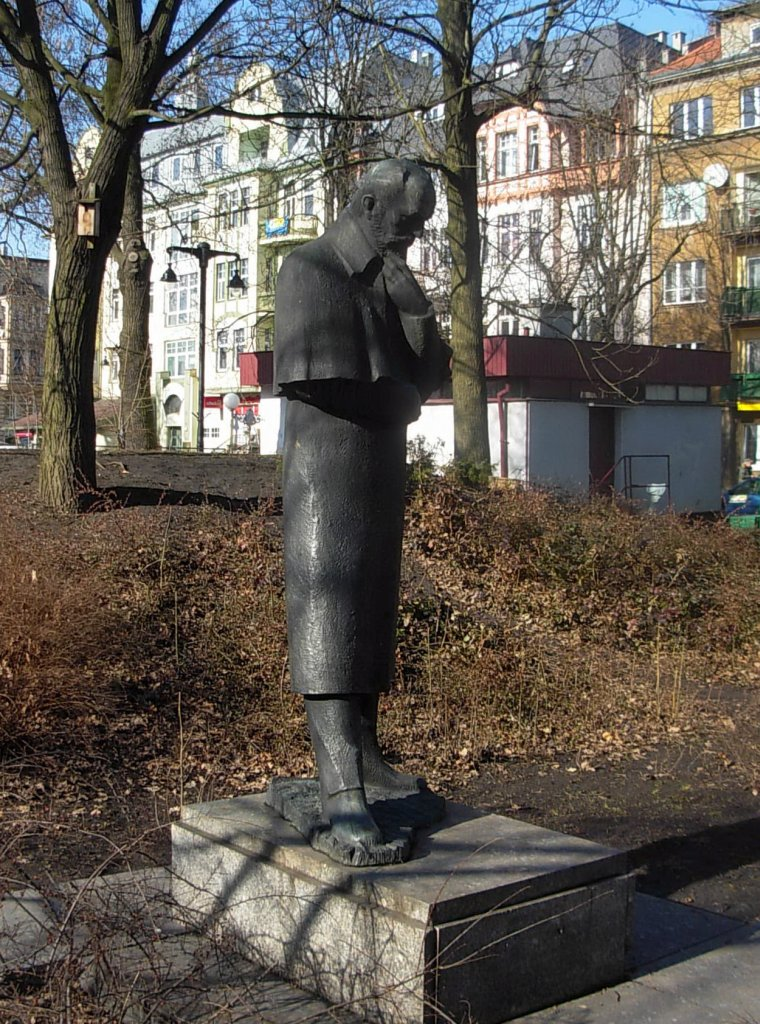
Tchaikovsky, Ewelina & Henryk Szczech-Siwicka

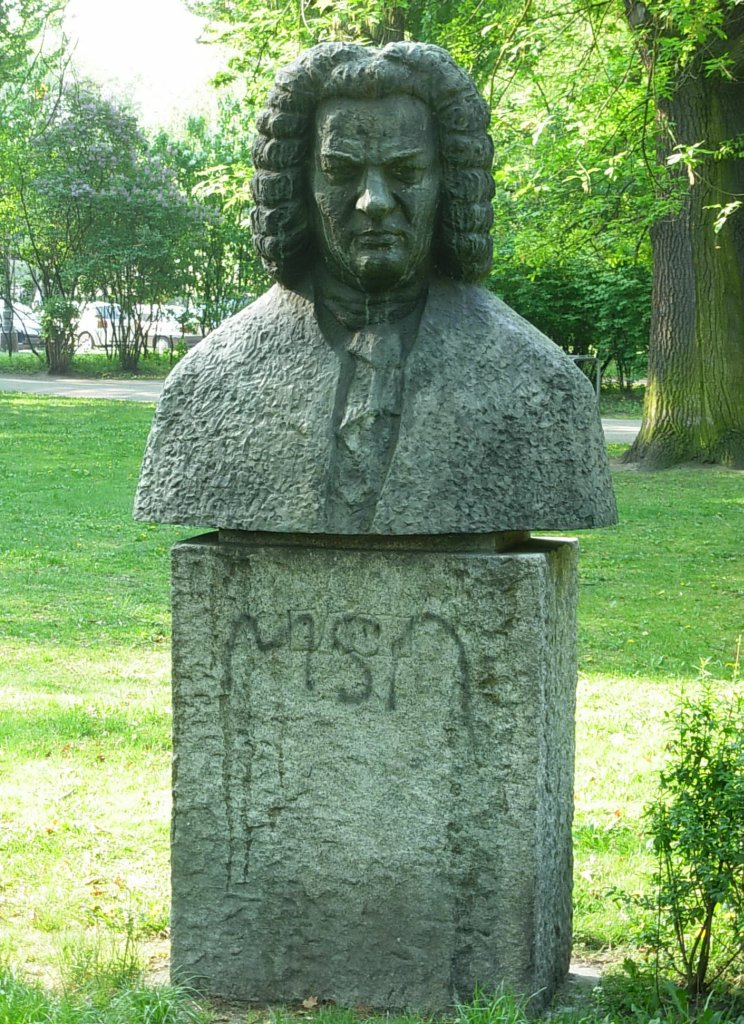
Johann Sebastian Bach, Witold Marciniak

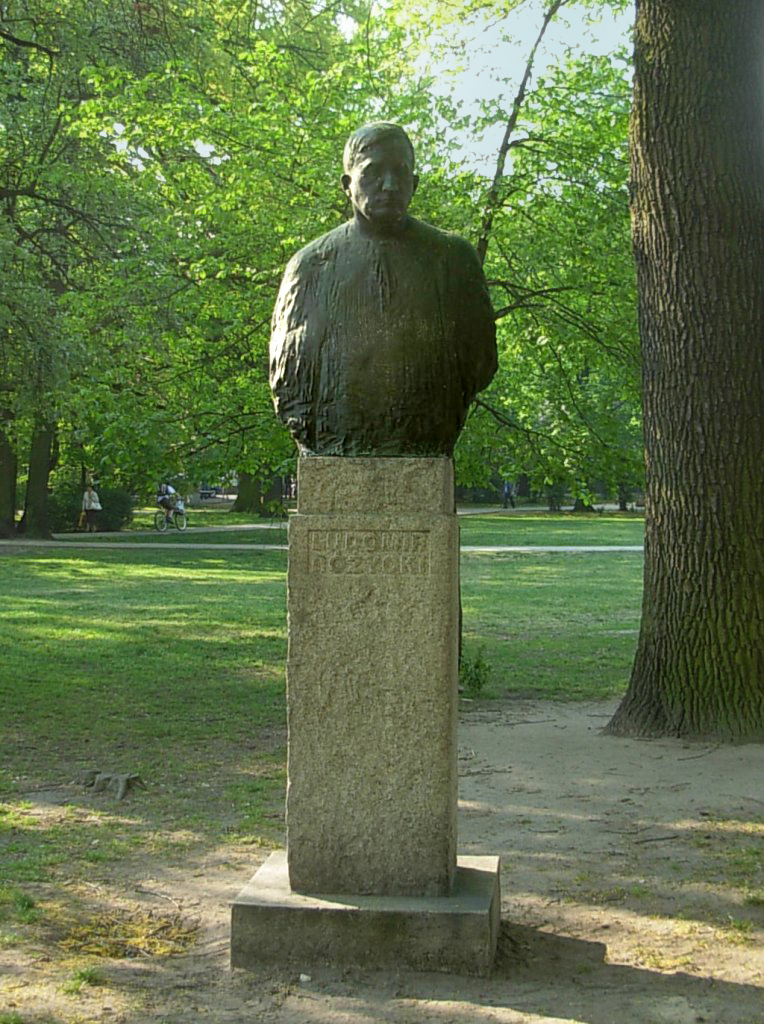
Różycki, Mieczysław Welter

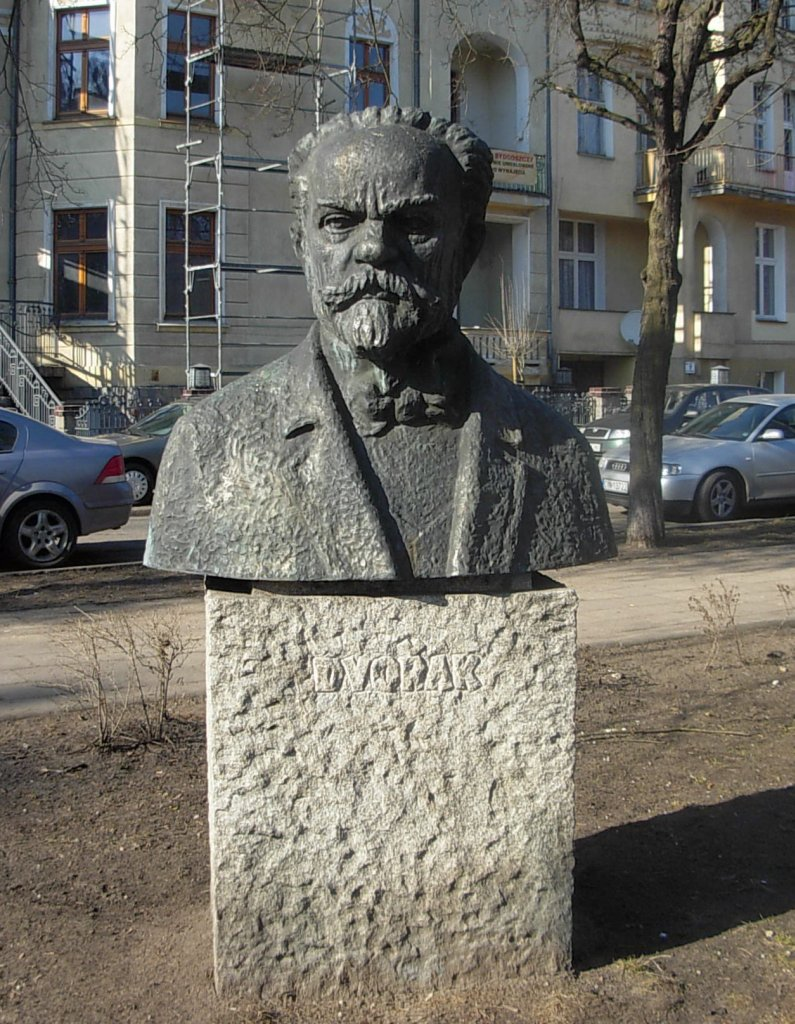
Dvořák, Witold Marciniak

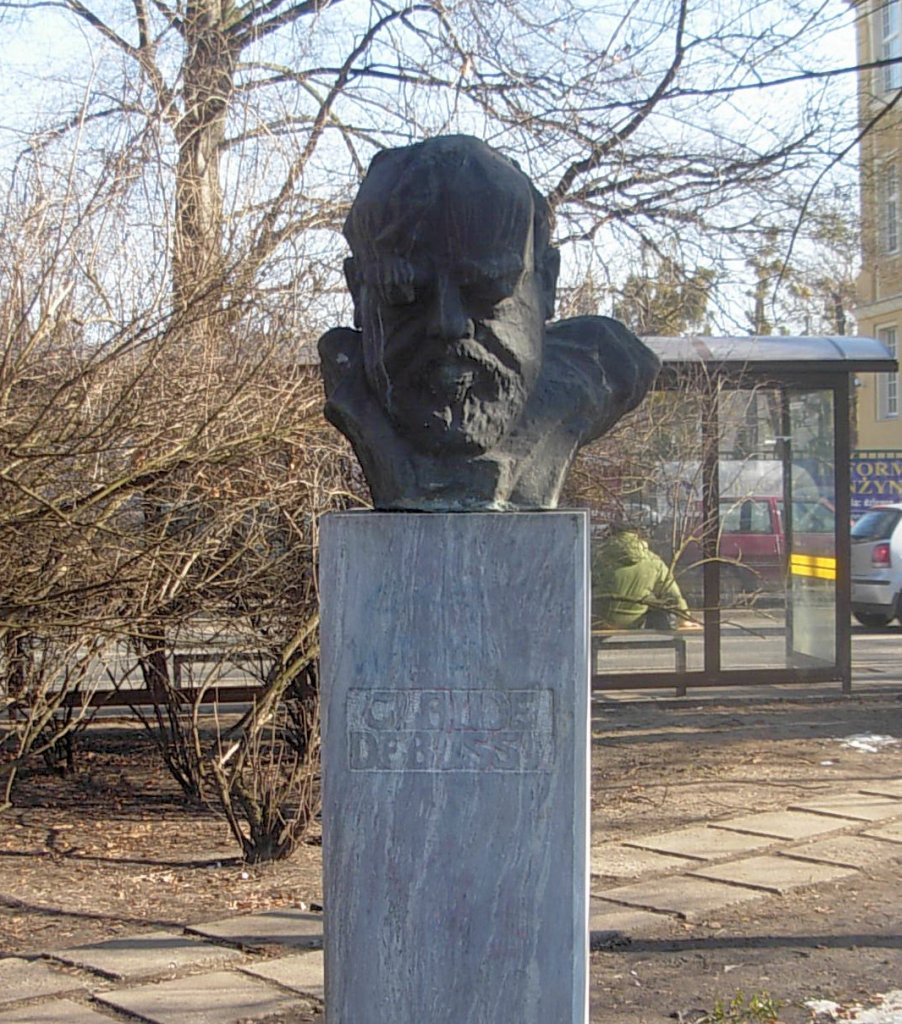
Debussy, Andrzej Kasten

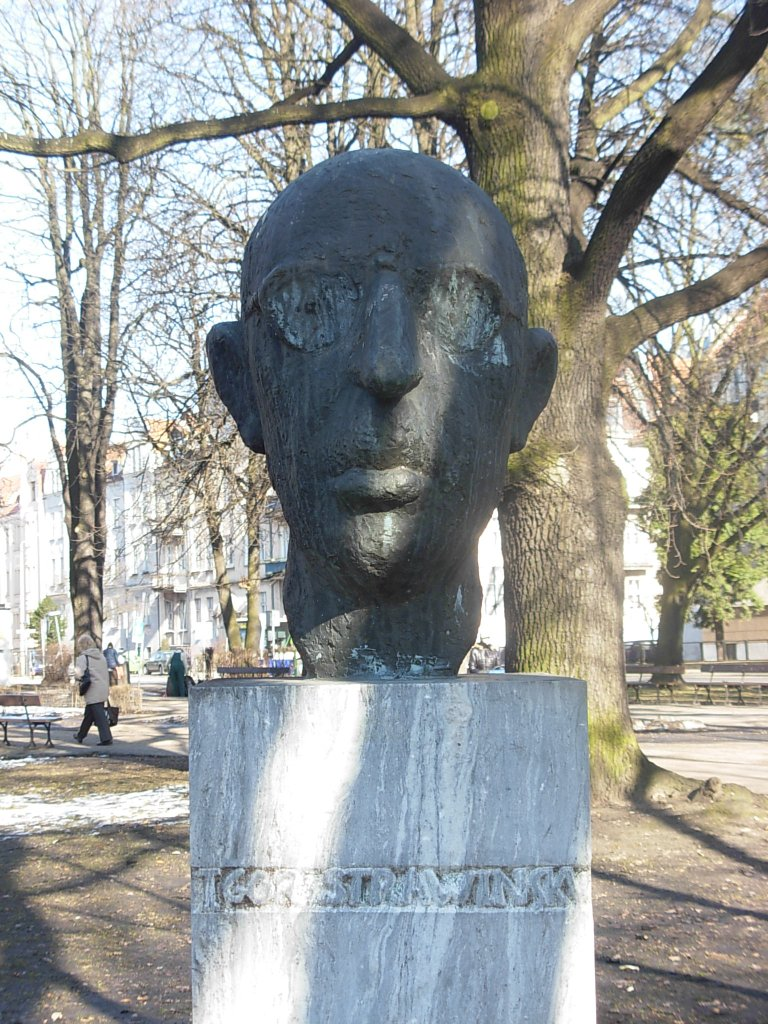
Stravinsky, Barbara Zbrożyna

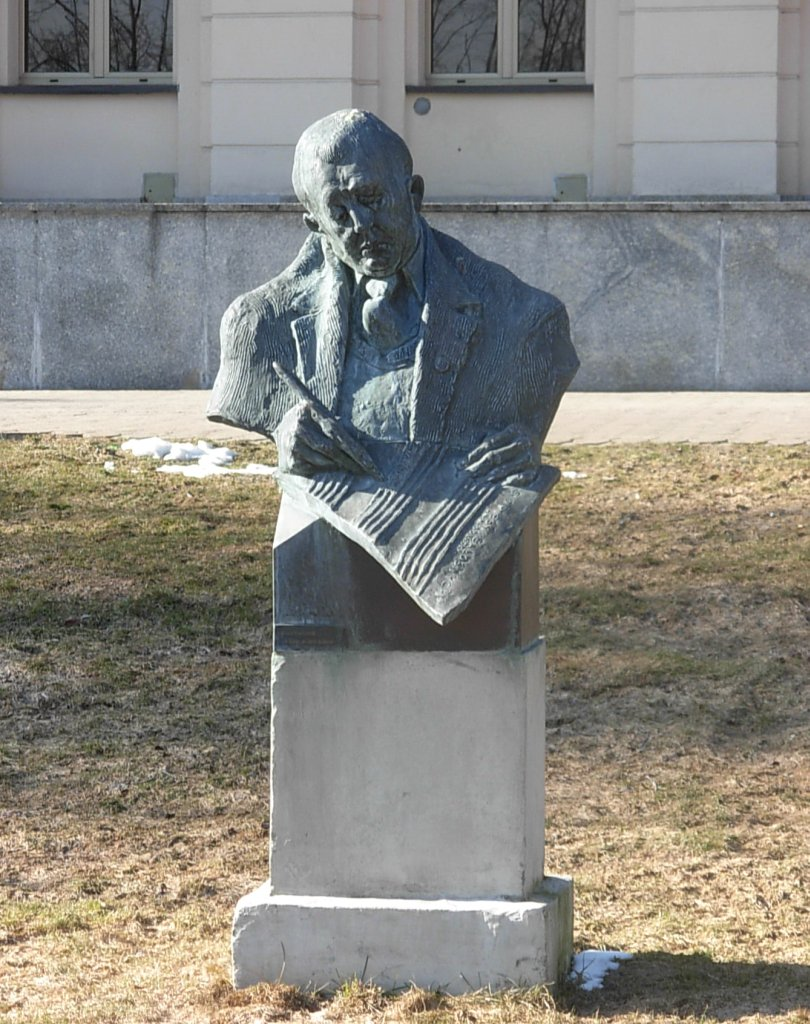
Henryk Mikołaj Górecki, Ryszard Wojciechowski

== Species ==
The park displays a mix of native species (oak, hornbeam, beech tree, sycamore) and alien species (red beech and white horse chestnut). Moreover, one can notice red horse-chestnuts and European beeches (purple variety and cone variety)

Nearby the Pomeranian Philharmonic building stand red horse-chestnuts and umbrella hornbeam. In the same way, abutting the Main building of Bydgoszcz Music Academy grow silver maples, a large English oaks and rare conifer species (Douglas-fir, eastern white pine and savin juniper).

In the park are registered 21 species, making it the second most rich park in Bydgoszcz, with regards to vegetal variety.

Polish Natural Monuments in Jan Kochanowski Park and its surroundings

| Nr | Type | Location | Nr of trees | Notes |
| 1. | Italian alder | Southern portion of the park | 2 | Trunks diameters: 172 and 145 cm |
| 2. | Black poplar | Centre of the park | 2 | Trunk diameter: 421 and 510 cm |
| 3. | English oak | Centre of the park | 2 | Trunks diameters: 322 and 344 cm |
| 4. | Red horse-chestnut | Around the Pomeranian Philharmonic building | 6 | Trunk diameter: from 170 to 234 cm |
| 5. | English hawthorn | At Kołłątaja street 4 | 1 | Trunk diameter: 176 cm |
| 6. | English oak | Centre of the park | 2 | |
| 7 | English oak | All through the park | 6 | Trunks diameters: from 270 to 312 cm |

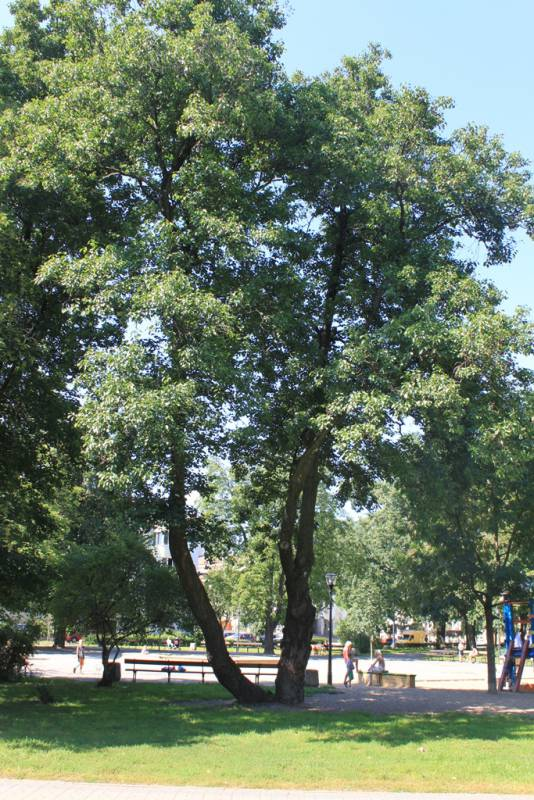
Italian alder

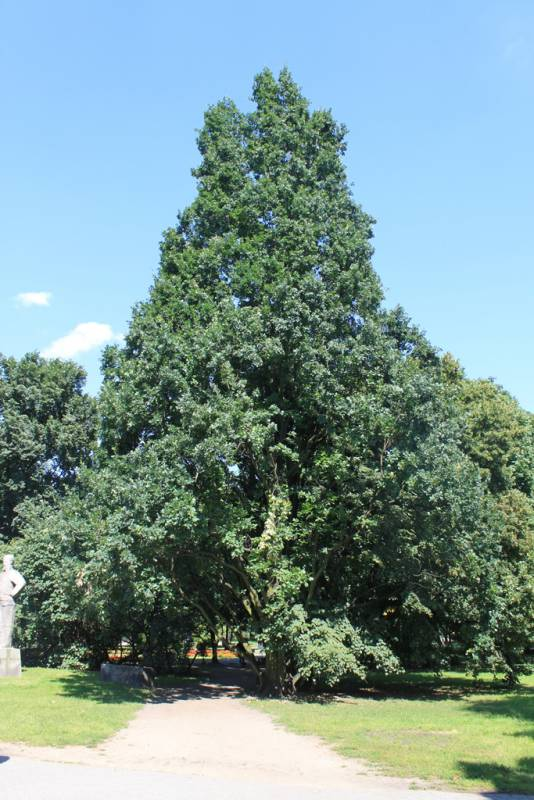
English Oak

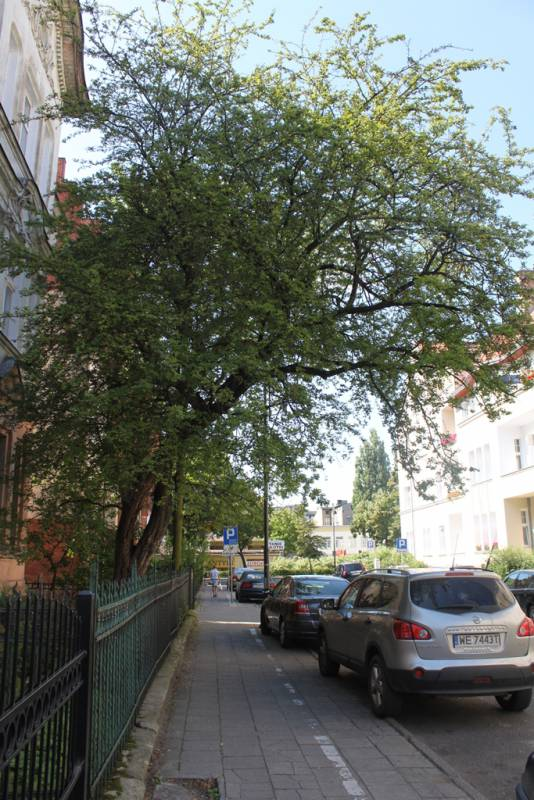
Hawthorn

== Gallery ==
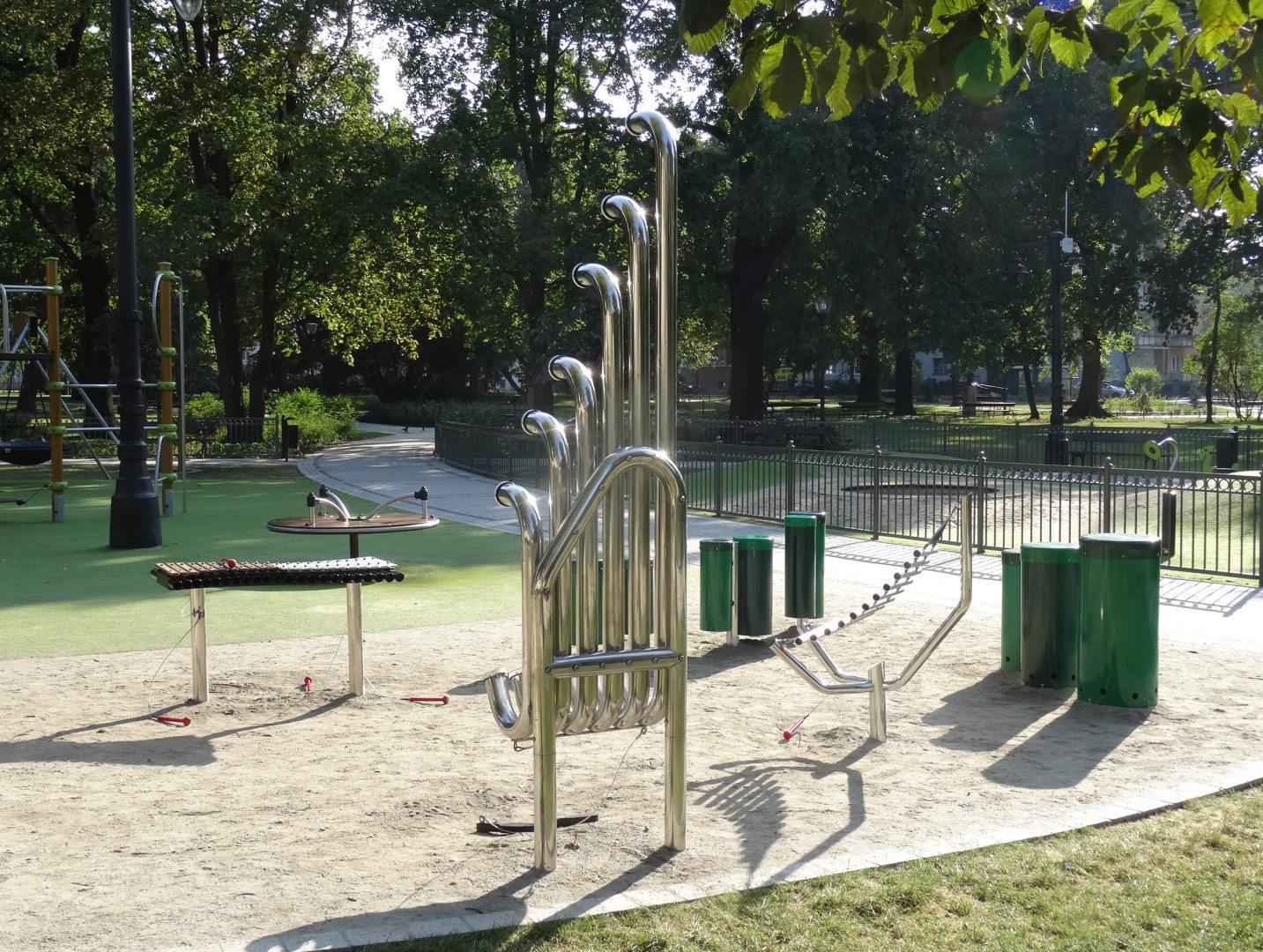
Children's playground with outdoor musical instruments

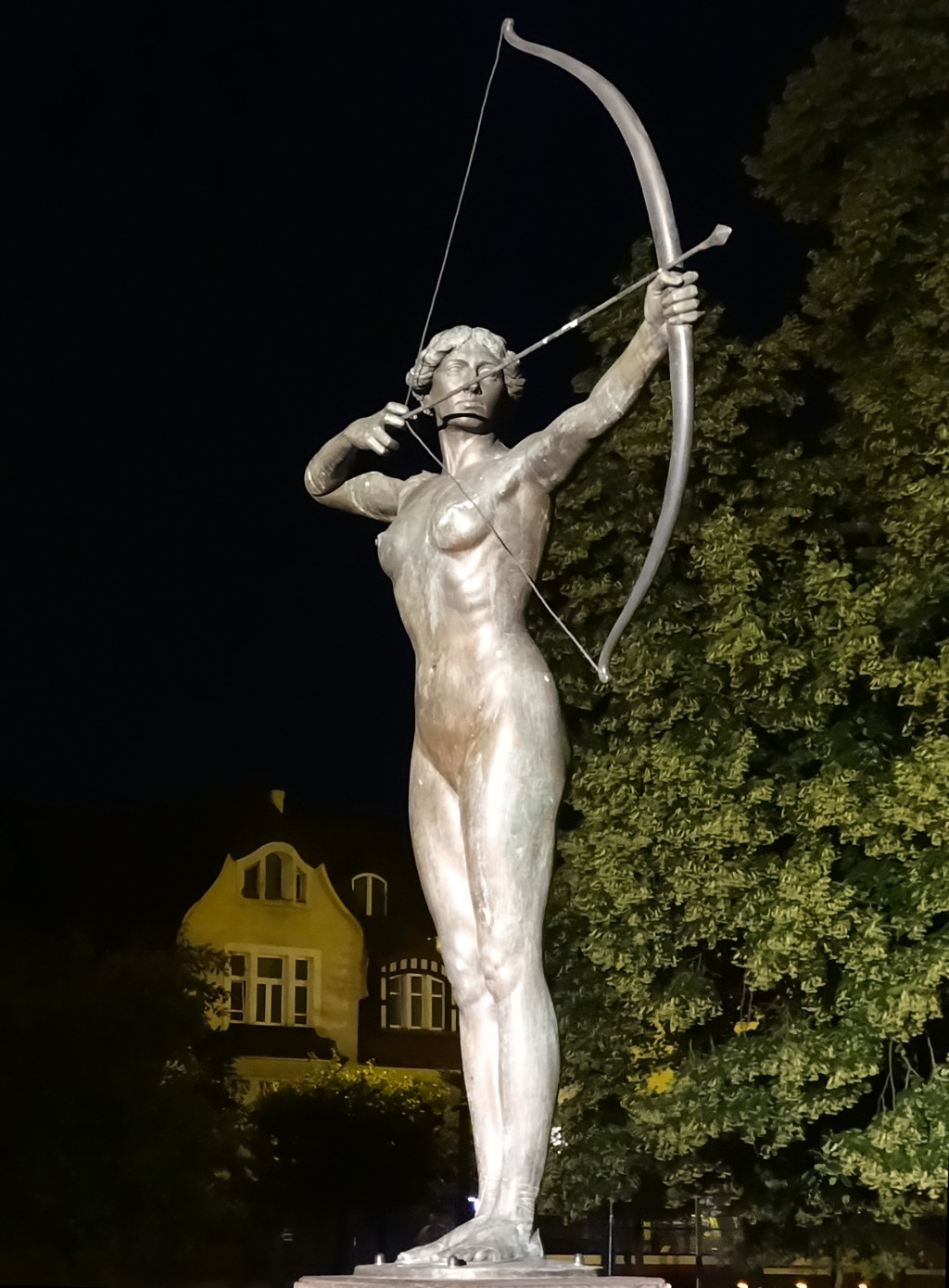
"The Archer" by night

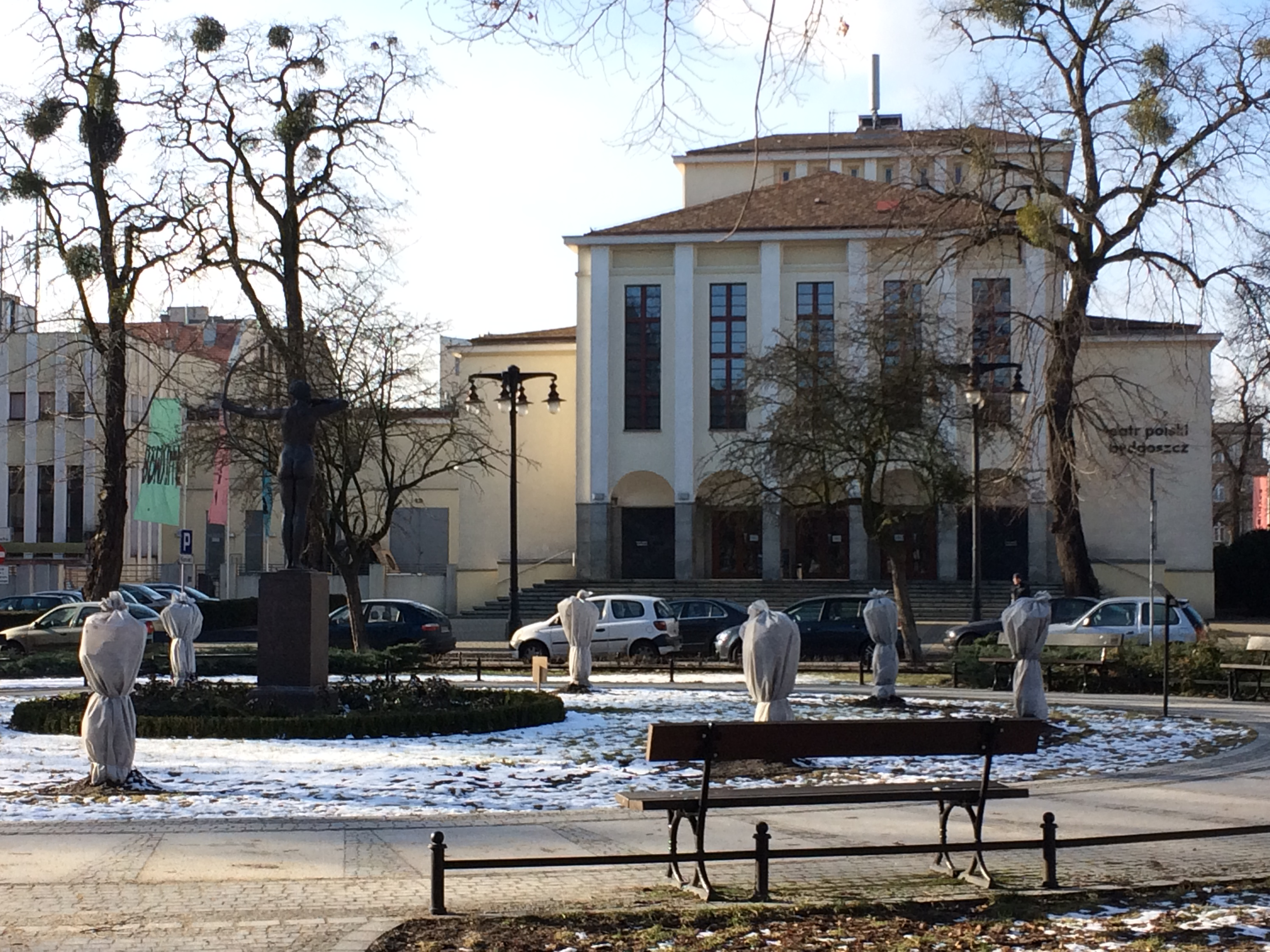
In winter, the Polish Theatre in the background

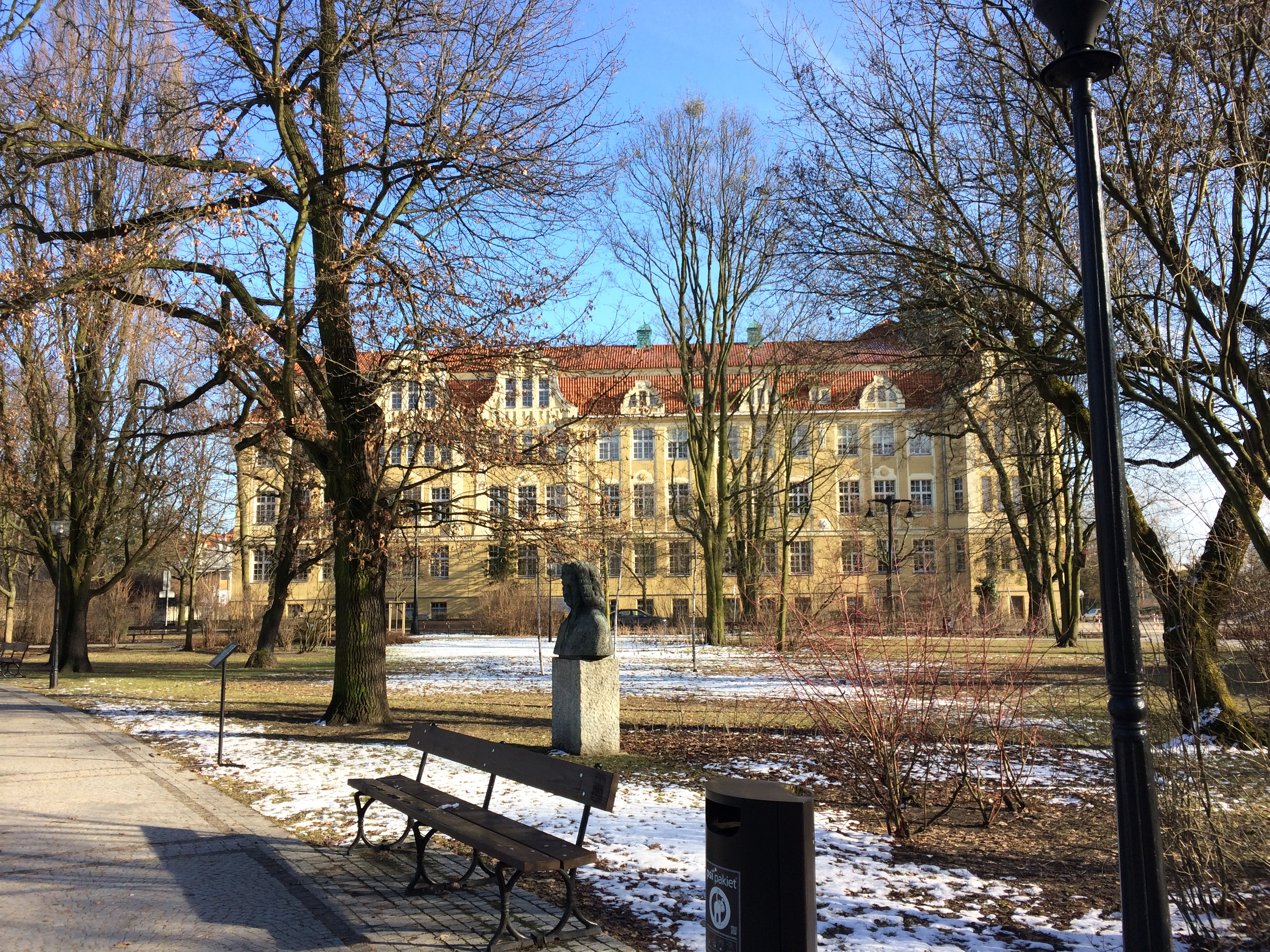
Bust of Bach with the Copernicanum building

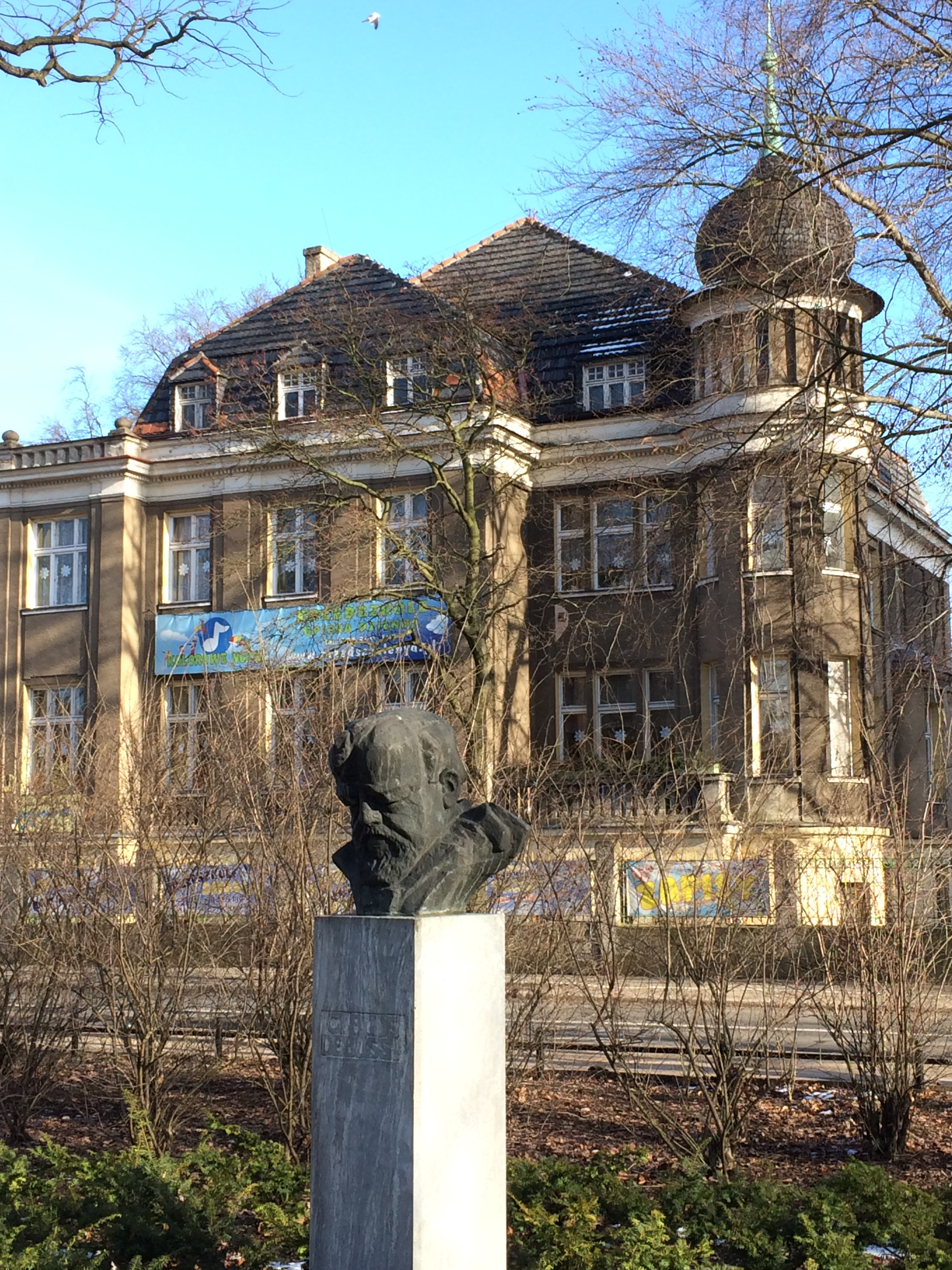
Bust of Debussy with Ignacego Paderewskiego street in the backdrop

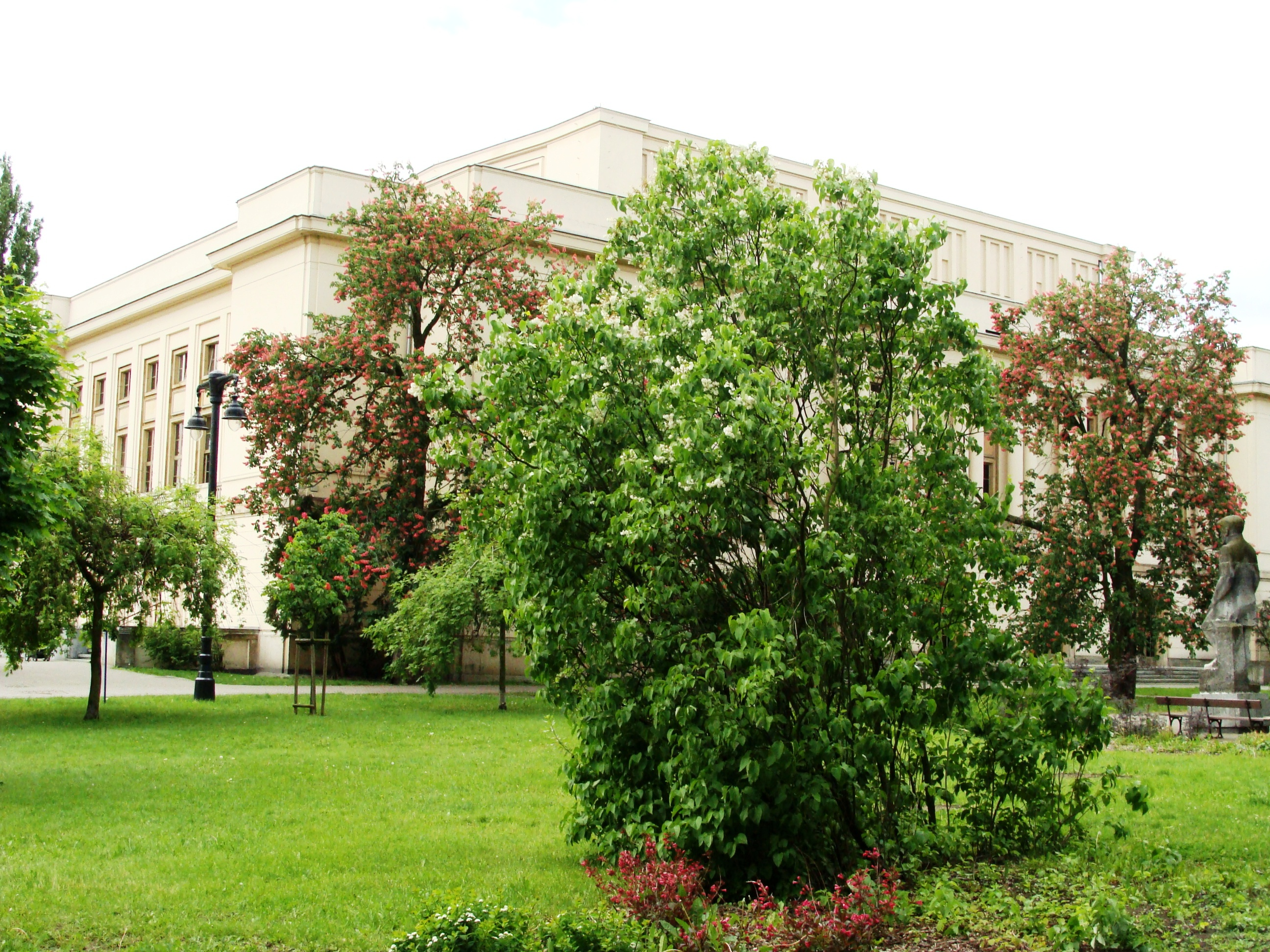
View of the Pomeranian Philharmonic building

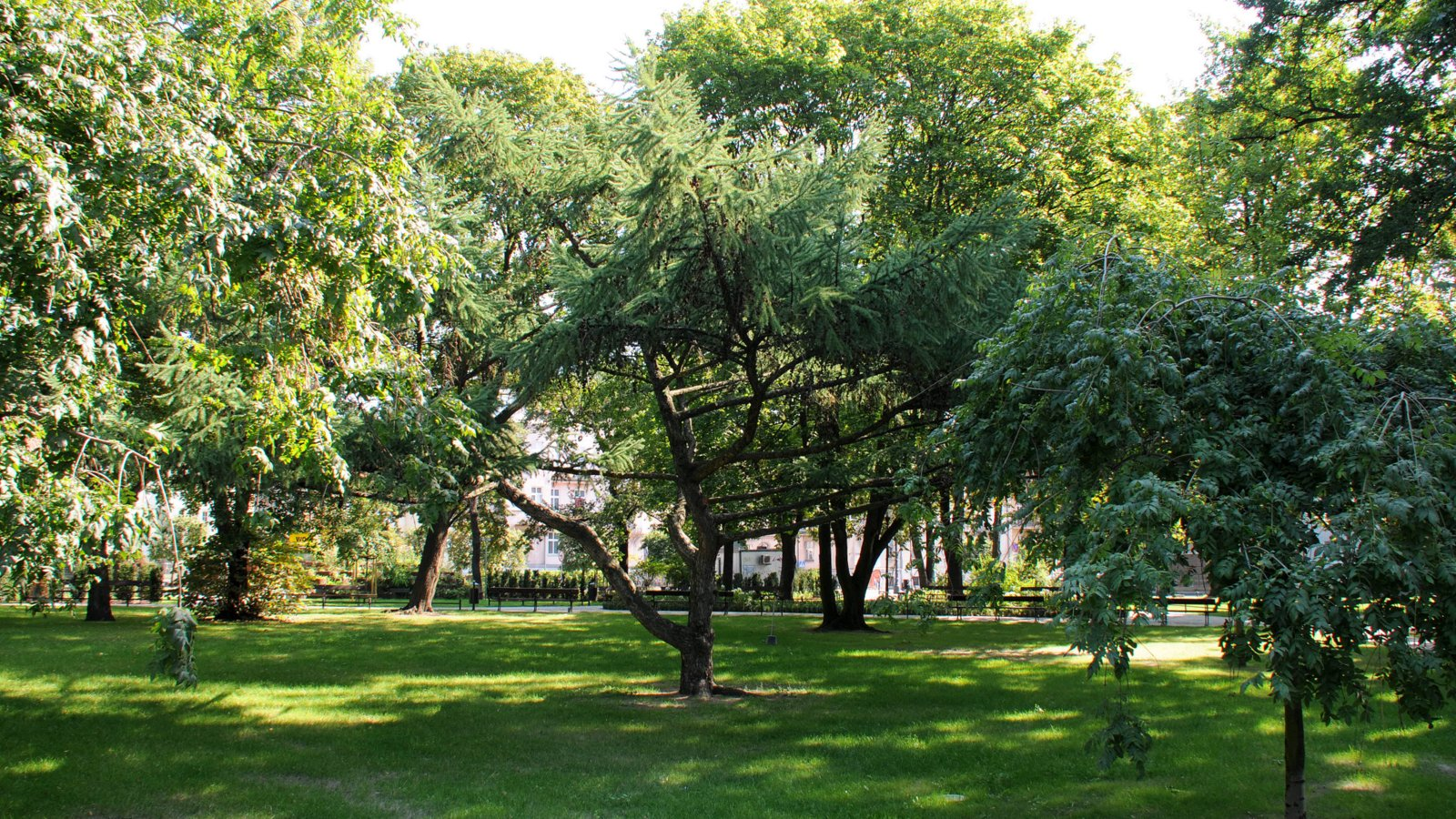
View of the park in Summer

== See also ==
- Bydgoszcz
- Pomeranian Philharmonic
- Adam Mickiewicz Alley
- Main building of Bydgoszcz Music Academy
- Staszica and Paderewskiego Streets in Bydgoszcz

== Bibliography ==
- Pastuszewski, Stefan (1996). Bydgoska Gospodarka Komunalna. Praca zbiorowa (in Polish). Bydgoszcz: Instytut Wydawniczy „Świadectwo”. ISBN 83-85860-37-1.
- Kaja, Renata (1995). Bydgoskie pomniki przyrody (in Polish). Bydgoszcz: Instytut Wydawniczy „Świadectwo”. ISBN 83-85860-32-0.
- Kuczma, Rajmund (1995). Zieleń w dawnej Bydgoszczy (in Polish). Bydgoszcz: Instytut Wydawniczy „Świadectwo”.
- Umiński, Janusz (1996). Bydgoszcz-Przewodnik (in Polish). Bydgoszcz: Wydawnictwo Uczelniane Wyższej Pomorskiej Szkoły Turystyki i Hotelarstwa w Bydgoszczy.
