= Makówiec Duży =

- Village
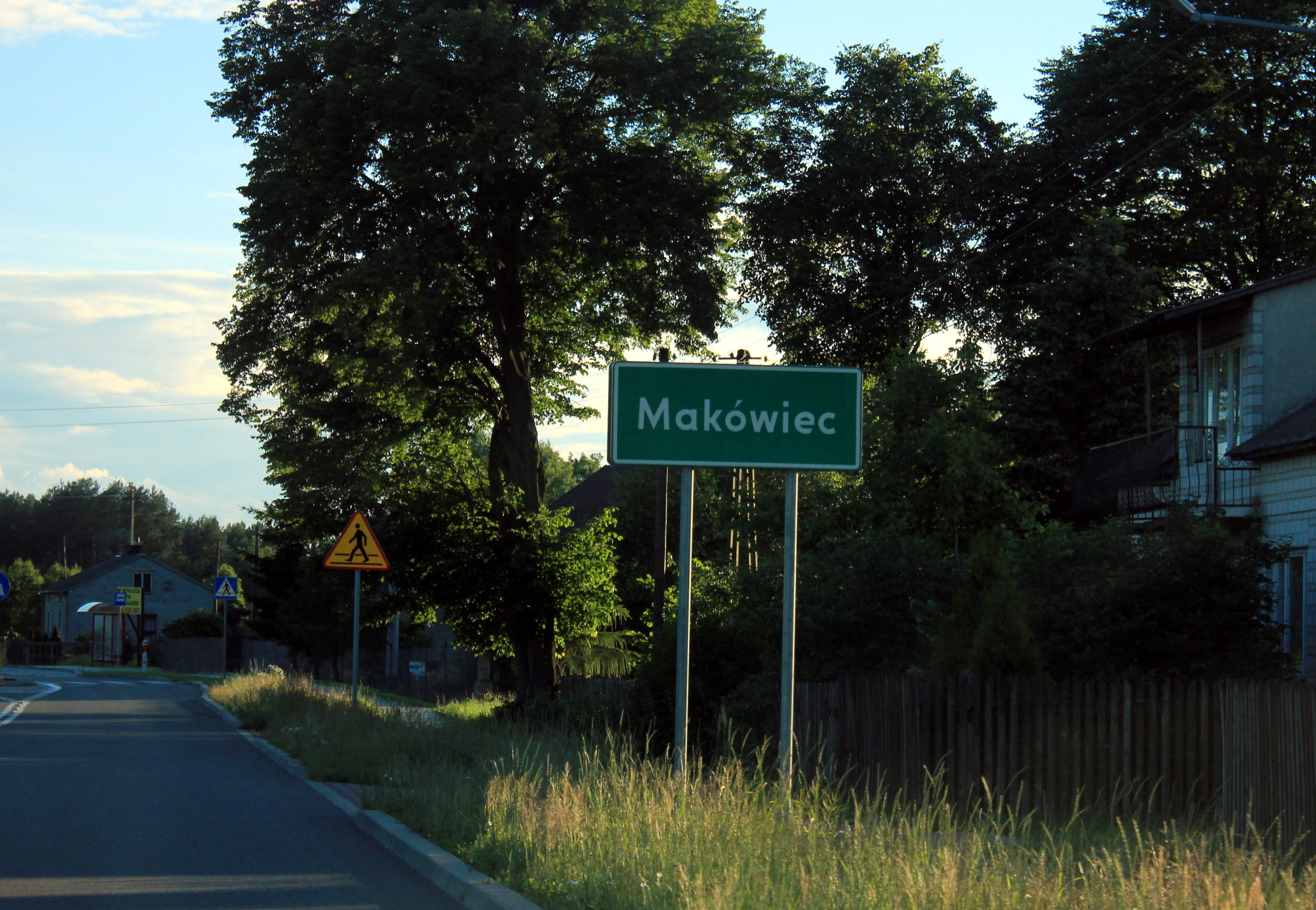

- Location within Poland
- Coordinates: 52°20′37″N 21°44′18″E
- Country: Poland
- Voivodeship: Masovian
- County: Mińsk
- Gmina: Dobre
- Population: 56

Makówiec Duży [maˈkuvjɛt͡s ˈduʐɨ] is a village in the administrative district of Gmina Dobre, within Mińsk County, Masovian Voivodeship, in east-central Poland.

Rector of the Jan Matejko Academy of Fine Arts in Kraków, a renowned sculptor Konstanty Laszczka of the Young Poland Movement, was born in Makówiec Duży in 1865.
