= Konstanty Laszczka =

Polish sculptor & painter (1865–1956)

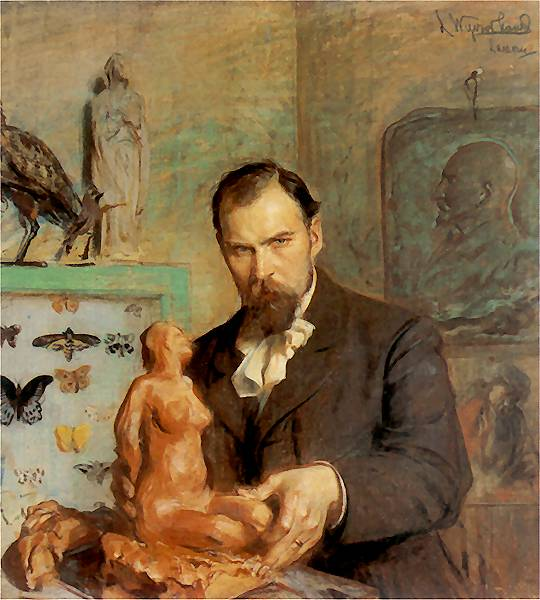
- Portrait of Konstanty Laszczka by Leon Wyczółkowski, (1901-1902)
- Born: 3 September 1865; Makówiec Duży, Russian Empire
- Died: 23 March 1956 (aged 90); Kraków, Polish People's Republic
- Education: Jan Matejko Academy of Fine Arts
- Known for: sculpture, painting
- Movement: Symbolism, Impressionism

Konstanty Laszczka (born 3 September 1865 in Makowiec Duży; died 23 March 1956 in Kraków) was a Polish sculptor, painter, graphic artist, as well as professor and rector of the Jan Matejko Academy of Fine Arts in Kraków. Laszczka became the Rector of the Academy in 1911; however, for family reason, he resigned from this function in 1912.

== Early life ==
Laszczka was born into a large farming family in Masovia, the son of Antoni Laszczka and his wife Katarzyna, from Kupce village. His talent was first discovered by the Ostrowscy family of landed gentry, who sponsored his art studies in Warsaw in 1885 under the tutorage of Jan Kryński and Ludwik Pyrowicz.

Soon later, Laszczka received a scholarship from the Polish Society of Visual Arts (Towarzystwo Sztuk Pięknych) called "Zachęta" and went to Paris in 1891. While in France, he studied at the École nationale supérieure des Beaux-Arts Academy. He received directions from such artists as Jean-Antoine Mercié, Alexandre Falguiere and Jean-Léon Gérôme. He was also involved in the arts movement of the French Polonia. In 1897 Laszczka returned to Poland under foreign partitions and became a teacher in Warsaw.

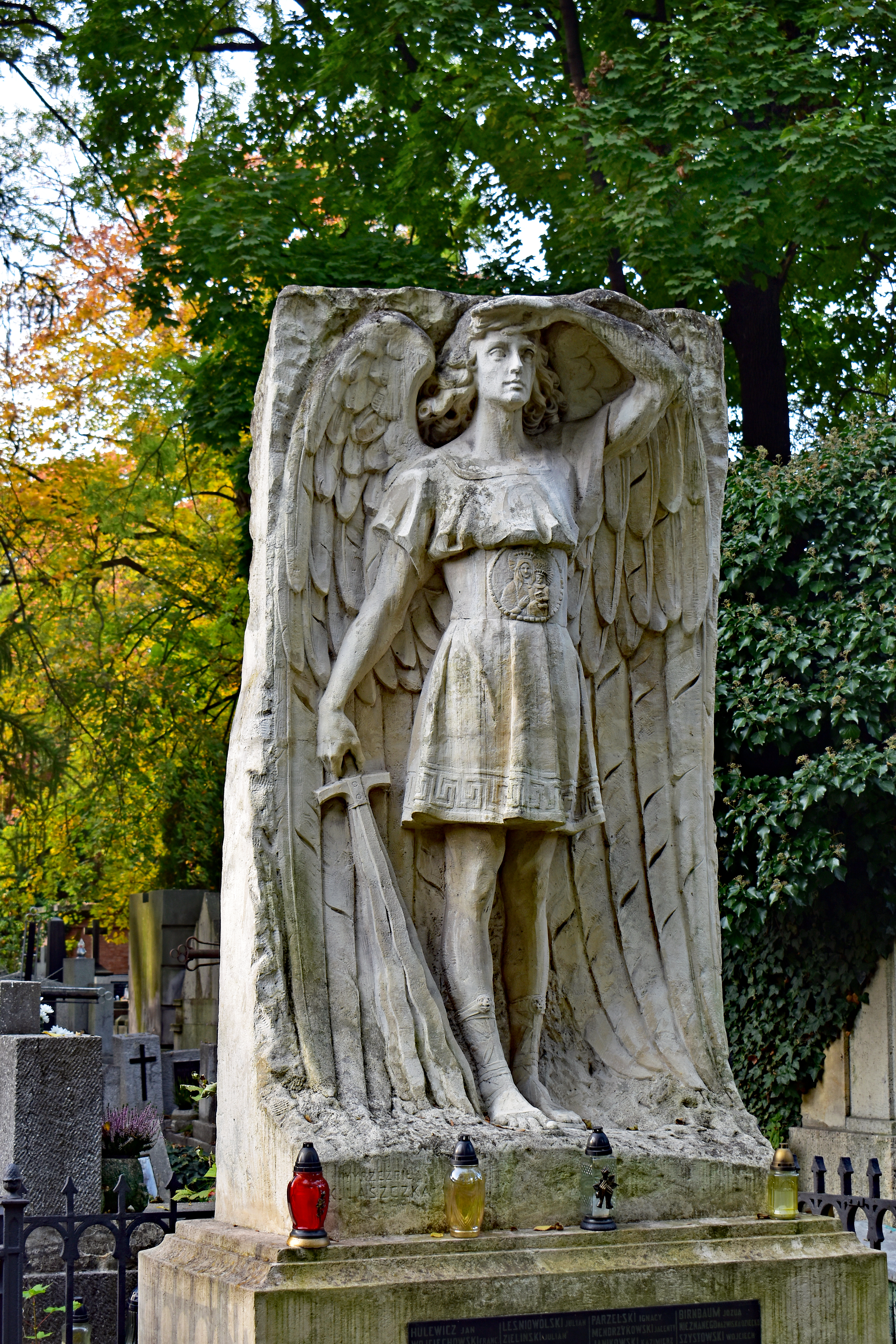
"The Avenging Angel" by Konstanty Laszczka, regarded as one of the most beautiful sculptures at the Rakowicki Cemetery

In 1899, at the invitation of painter Julian Fałat, Laszczka settled in Kraków, where he became a professor at the Academy of Fine Arts. In the years 1900-1935, he was a director at the Sculpture Department there.

== Professional career ==
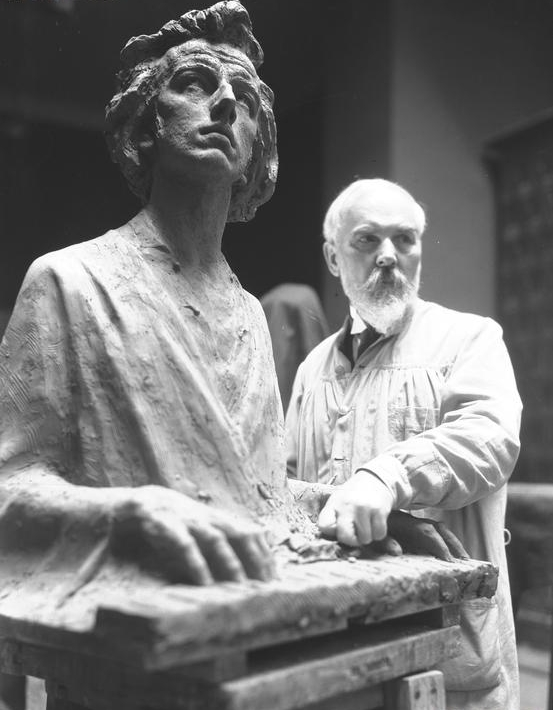
Laszczka working on a sculpture of Fryderyk Chopin, 1933

While in Kraków, Konstanty Laszczka became close friends with Stanisław Wyspiański and Leon Wyczółkowski. He was one of the founding members of the Society of Polish Artists called "Sztuka" (Art), with the aesthetic philosophy of the Young Poland Movement. Among his students were: Stanisław Jackowski, Bolesław Biegas, Xawery Dunikowski, Ludwik Konarzewski, Franciszek Mączyński, Olga Niewska and Zofia Baltarowicz-Dzielińska. In the years 1900-1910, he also cooperated as a graphic designer and sculptor with the ceramic factory of Józef Niedźwiecki in nearby Dębniki. His son, Bogdan Laszczka, became an architect and activist of the Polish Tatra Society. Laszczka died in Kraków at the end of the Stalinist period and was buried there at the famous Rakowicki Cemetery.

In his work, Konstanty Laszczka followed the example of his master, the French sculptor Auguste Rodin. The influence is most evident in a series of female nude studies, sculpted around the turn of the century and based on symbolic themes. The earliest statue, called "Zima (Konik polny)" (Winter. The grasshopper), was made in 1895; later, Laszczka created more female nudes overwhelmed with emotions, such as "Żal" (Grief) in 1901, and "Zasmucona" (Overwhelmed with Sadness) 1901–1902 now at a National Gallery (photo). His connection with the Art Nouveau movement emanated from statues such as "W nieskończoność" (Eternally) from 1896–1897, "Nostalgia" (1903) and - inspired by Edvard Munch - "Krzyk" (The Scream) from 1902. He focused above all on sculpture, but also painted portraits, made medals, portrait medallions and occasional plaques. In the late period of his artistic career, he became interested in fired ceramics, with subject matter drawn from religious, folk and animal themes.

== See also ==
- List of Polish sculptors
- List of Polish painters

== Notes and references ==
- Kultura polska - Konstanty Laszczka
- Szkoła Podstawowa im. Konstantego Laszczki w Dobrem
- Agata Małodobry, "Rzeźba polska XIX i XX wieku," National Museum, Kraków

== Bibliography ==
- Dobrowolski Tadeusz, Sztuka Młodej Polski, Warszawa 1963.
- Słownik artystów polskich i obcych w Polsce działających. Malarze, rzeźbiarze, graficy, t. II, Wrocław 1975 (Urszula Leszczyńska).
- Kotkowska-Bareja Hanna, Konstanty Laszczka, Siedlce 1976.
- Puciata-Pawłowska Joanna, Konstanty Laszczka, Siedlce 1980.
