= BWA – Municipal Art Gallery of Bydgoszcz =

- Polish: Galeria Miejska bwa w Bydgoszczy
- Former name: Central Bureau of Art Exhibitions
- Established: 1949
- Location: 20 Gdanska street, Bydgoszcz, Poland
- Coordinates: 53°7′34″N 18°0′18″E
- Type: Modern Art Gallery
- Director: Karolina Leśnik
- Owner: City of Bydgoszcz
- Website: www.galeriabwa.bydgoszcz.pl

Municipal Art Gallery BWA is the largest and most important art gallery in Bydgoszcz.

== Location ==
The gallery is located at 20 Gdańska Street. It stands between St Peter's and St Paul's Church and the Park Casimir the Great.

== History ==
After World War II, the majority of artistic activity in Bydgoszcz was concentrated in the Pomeranian Arts House, be it Opera, Theatre or exhibitions.

On 7 May 1946, during the celebration of the 600th anniversary of the city of Bydgoszcz, has been unveiled the Pomeranian Arts House (Polish: Pomorski Dom Sztuki) comprising, among other elements, a permanent showroom for arts, called BWA ((in Polish) Biuro Wystaw Artystycznych - Central Bureau of Art Exhibitions). The building on Gdańska Street was also the seat of art workshops for Pomeranian writers, musicians and artists from all domains and in addition the premises have been used by State School of Art "Leon Wyczółkowski" until 1982.

To gain independence and visibility, a dedicated building has been erected in 1970, thanks to the active support of, among others, Alexander Schmidt then President of the Bydgoscy Region, and Andrzej Szwalbe, director of the Pomeranian Philharmonic. It had been designed so as to be connected to the historical building, the Pomeranian Arts House. In 1994, the gallery came under the administration of the Town Hall.

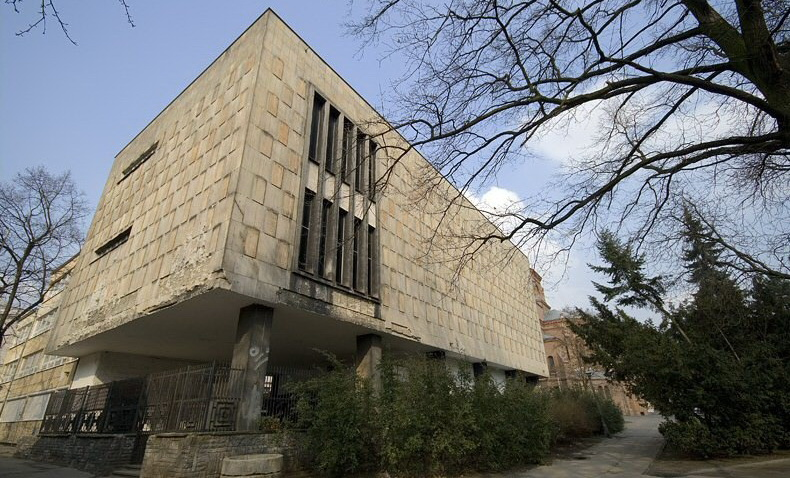
BWA building with the connection to the Pomeranian Arts House on the left

== Architecture ==
The facility provides currently there the opportunity for each discipline of contemporary art environment to be exhibitedin fields such as: painting, graphics, sculpture, fabric creations, photography, video art...

It houses works of authors from various origins: Bydgoszcz, but also from Poland and abroad.

The two floors edifice offer extensive spaces, each consisting of a large hall with an area of 364 square meters and a chamber hall with an area of 61 square meters. In addition, the ground floor there has got a 118 square meter multimedia room.

The library of the gallery provides new publications in the field of contemporary art, as well as a documentation regarding biographical files of artists. Each exhibition of the gallery is provided with printed catalogs and sundry documentation (briefcase containing catalogs, reviews, photos, videos).

The facility coordinates its activity with 2 other galleries of Bydgoszcz, Kantorek Gallery (Gdanska street 3) and Brda Gallery.

== Activities ==
Among the individual exhibitions that has been housed in the BWA pavilion, works of the following artists were shown: Magdalena Abakanowicz, Kiejstut Bereźnicki, Jerzy Duda-Gracz, Edward Hartwig, Władysław Hasior, Teofil Ociepka, Henryk Stażewski, Józef Szajna, Alina Szapocznikow or Stanisław Ignacy Witkiewicz. Also various works have been displayed by well-known foreign artists: Salvador Dalí, Joachim Fleischer, Pablo Picasso, Andy Warhol.

The gallery organizes numerous lectures on art, film screenings, meetings with directors, seminars, panel discussions. An important event is the annual Nights of Performance, where visitors can see live performances of Polish and foreign artists.

It has also hosted famous exhibitions (CHINaRT, Contemporary Art Lithuania) but does not forget local artists in Bydgoszcz, who have individual and collective exhibitions and competitions ("Polygonum"). In order to promote those artists, BWA organizes exhibitions in other Polish art gallery (Poznań, Piła) and abroad, in cities such as Vilnius (Lithuania), Pitești (Romania), Le Havre and Rouen (France) or Copenhagen (Denmark).

Since 2011, Gallery collaborates with the organizers of Camerimage festival, proposing exhibitions in the field of visual arts, with notorious guests:

- Andrzej Wajda - Drawings in 2011;
- David Lynch - Lithographs in 2012;
- Ryszard Horowitz - RH 75 in 2014;
- Zdzisław Beksiński - Poza Snem in 2015;
- Jessica Lange - Unseen in 2016

== Gallery ==
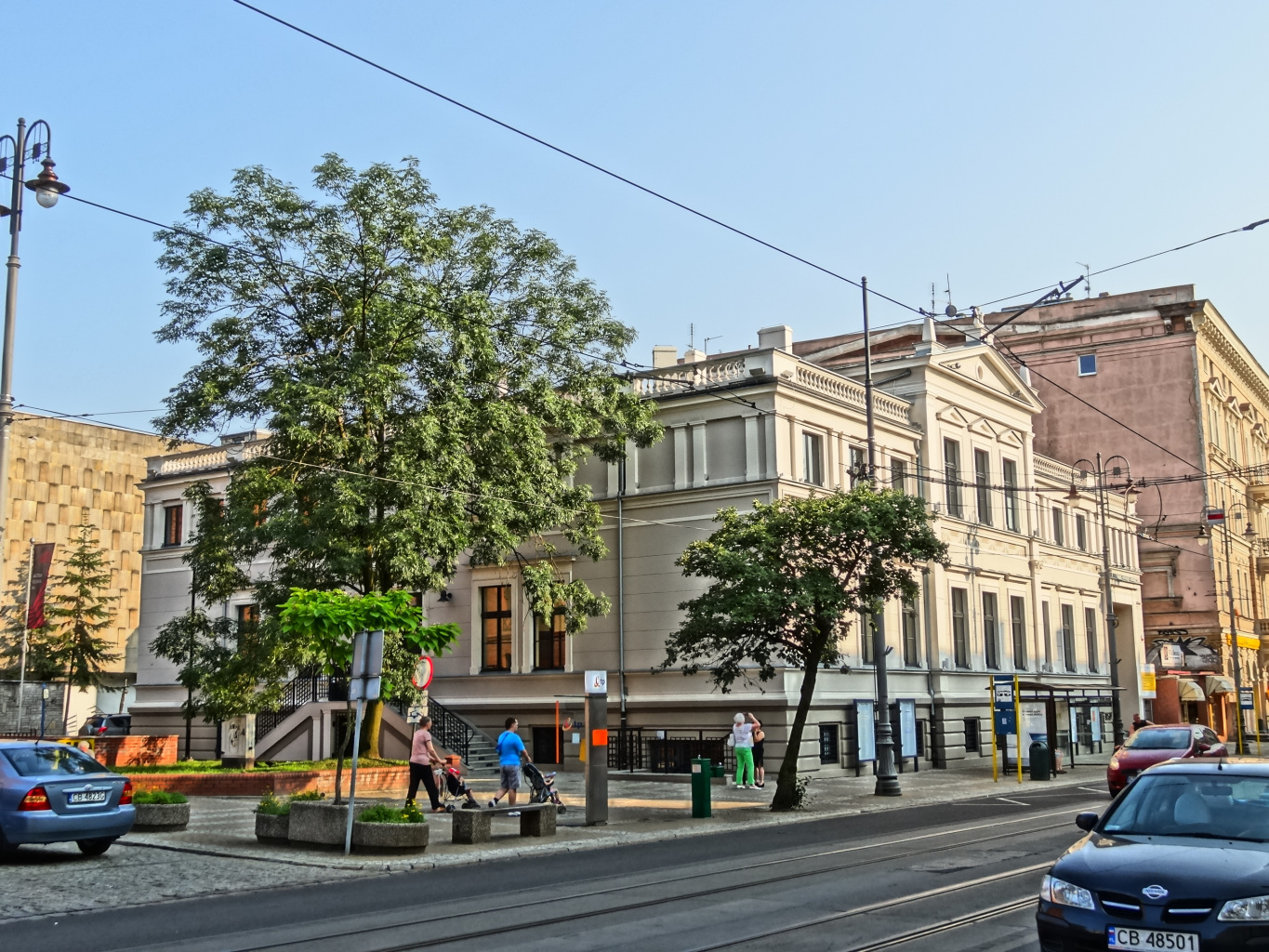
View from Gdanska street, with the Pomeranian Arts House on the front and yellow facade of BWA on the back

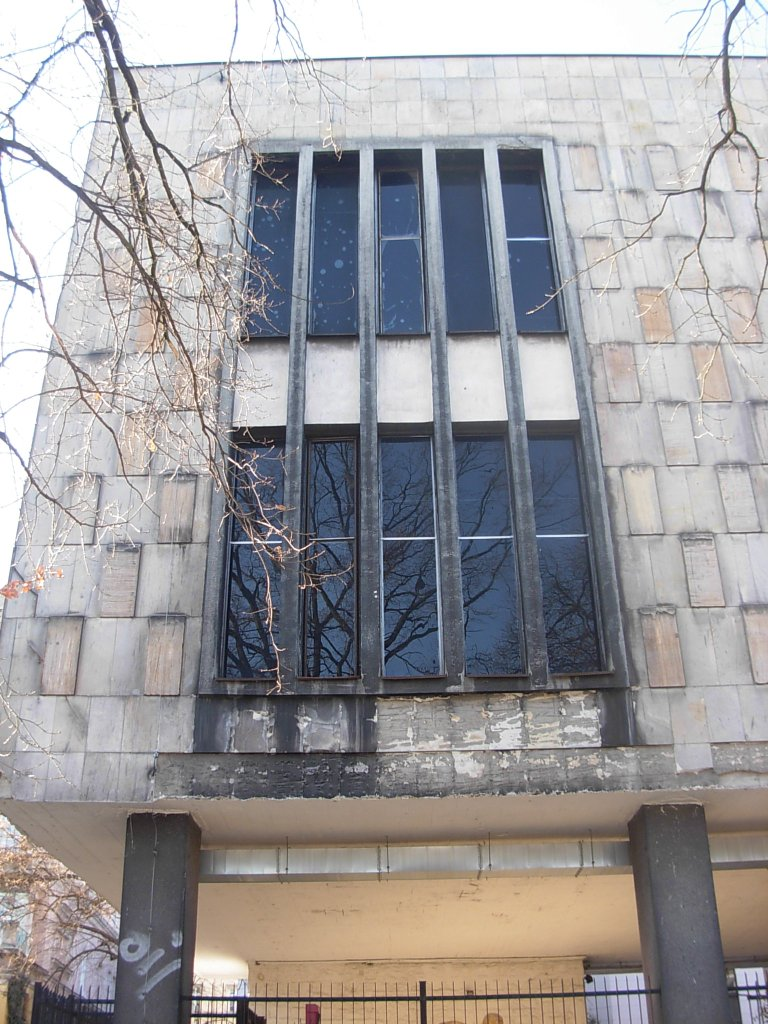
View from the park

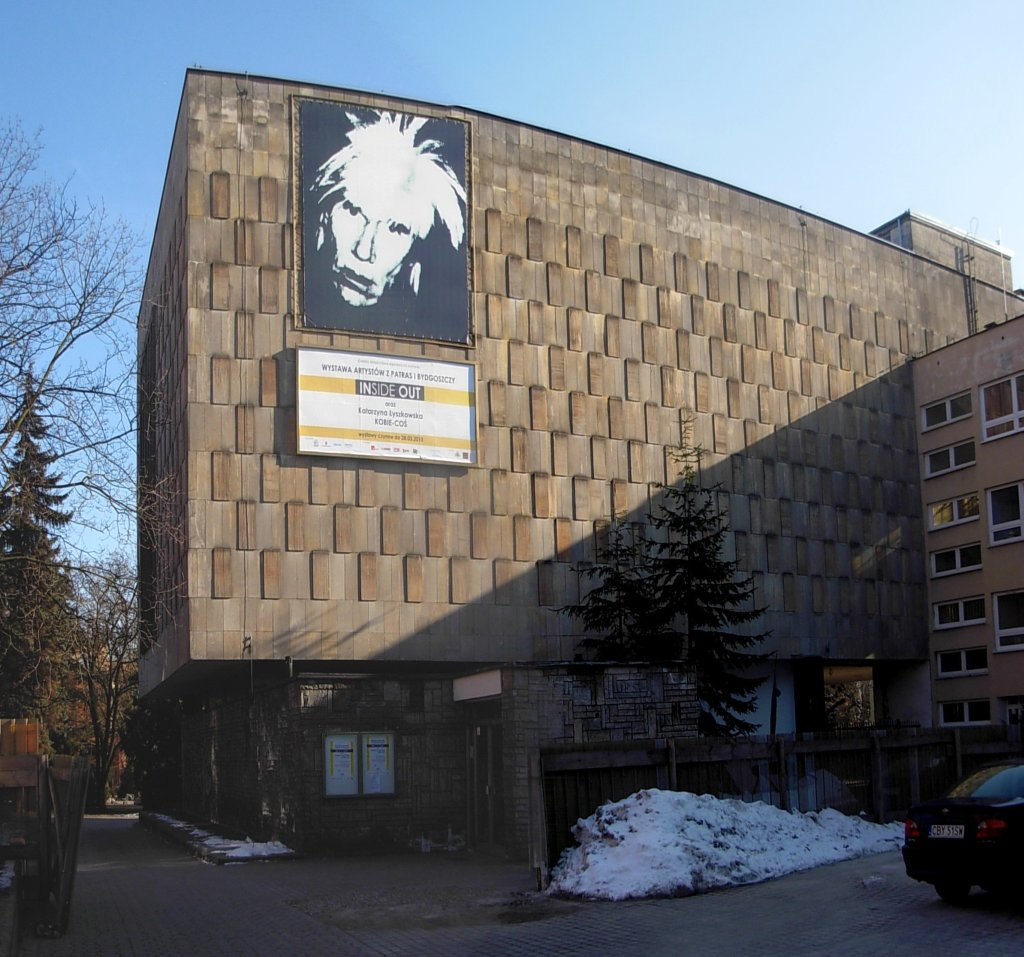
Main view

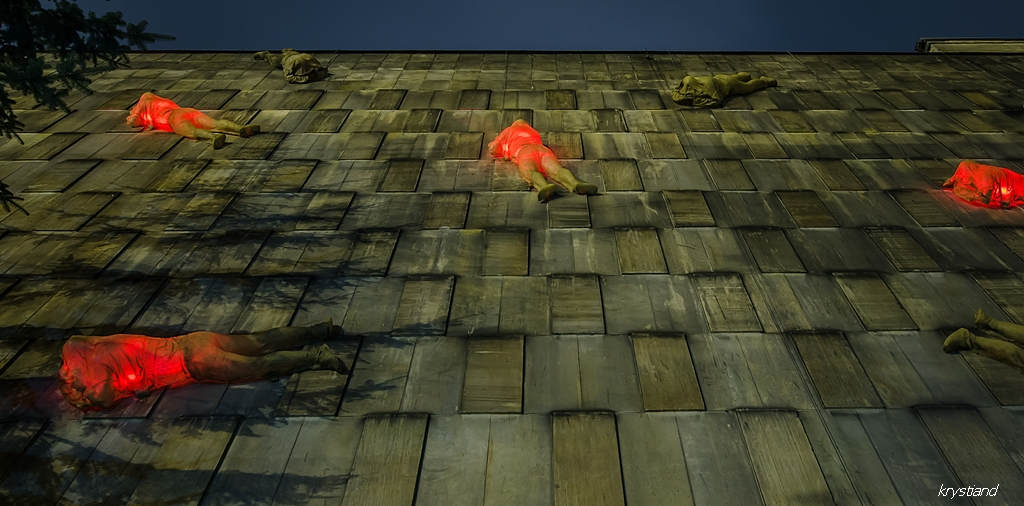
Main facade artistically decorated

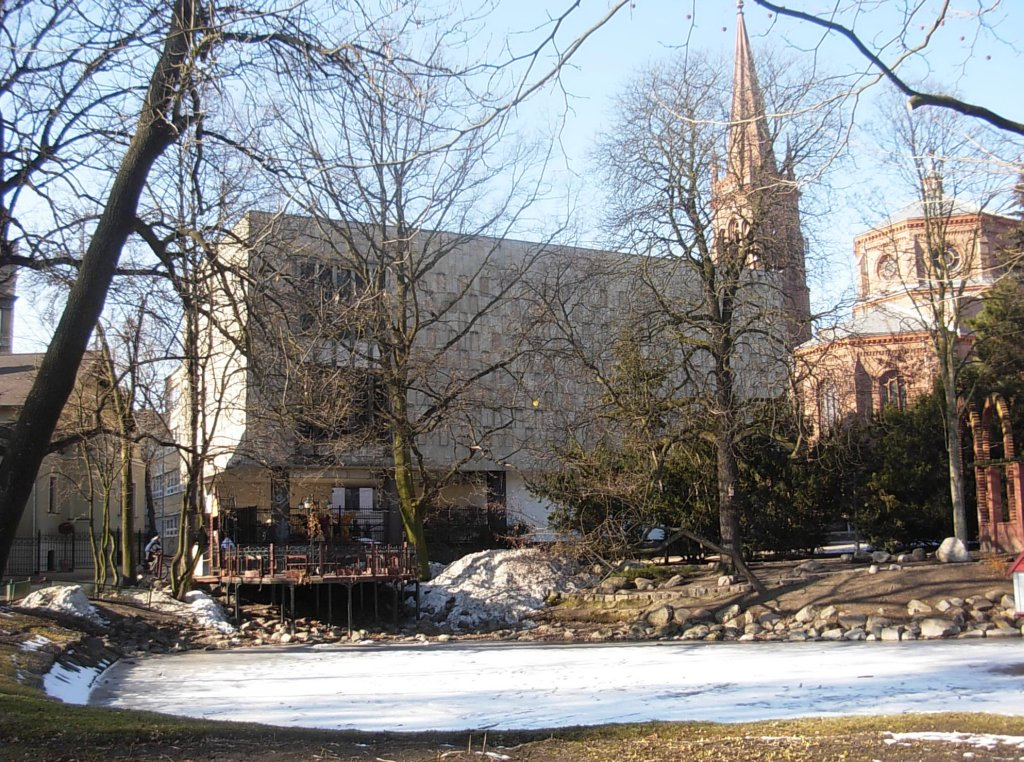
View from the park

== See also ==
- Bydgoszcz
- Gdańska Street, Bydgoszcz
- Casimir the Great Park
- (in Polish) Downtown district in Bydgoszcz
- (in Polish) Culture in Bydgoszcz

== Bibliography ==
- Noyce, Richard (1997). Contemporary graphic art in Poland. Michigan: Craftsman House. ISBN 9789057034817.
- (in Polish) MAZURKIEWICZ, MALGORZATA (1988). Bydgoskie Biuro Wystaw Artystycznych. Kalendarz Bydgoski. Bydgoszcz: Towarzystwo Miłosnikow Miasta Bydgoszczy. pp. 12–16.
