= Moral law =

Moral law may refer to:

- Moral absolutism, the ethical view that particular actions are intrinsically right or wrong
- The Ten Commandments, in Christianity
