= Krasiński Street 2, Bydgoszcz =

Tenement at Krasiński street 2
- Polish: Kamienica Krasińskiego 2 w Bydgoszczy
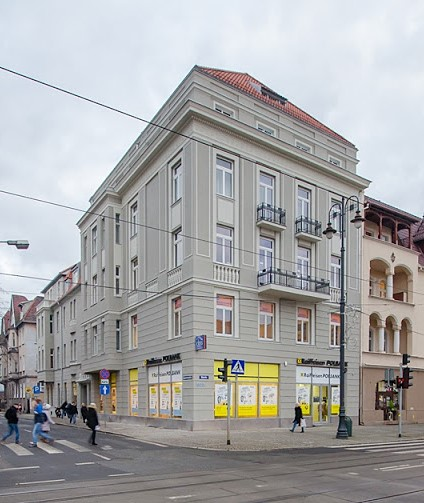
- View from Gdańska Street
- Interactive map of the Tenement at Krasiński street 2 area

General information
- Type: Tenement
- Architectural style: Classic Modern architecture
- Classification: Nr.601371-Reg.A/1090, 15 December 1993
- Location: 2 Krasiński street, Bydgoszcz, Poland, Poland
- Coordinates: 53°7′41″N 18°0′21″E
- Completed: 1912
- Owner: Bonifacy Cyrus (following owner)

Technical details
- Floor count: 5

Design and construction
- Architect: Franz Julius Knüpfer

The tenement at 2 Krasinski street is an historical building, ancient palace, in downtown Bydgoszcz.

== Location ==
The building stands on the eastern side of Gdańska Street, at the corner with Krasiński street.

== History ==
The building, erected in 1912, has been designed by German architect Franz Julius Knüpfer. Knüpfer was born in 1861 in Zeulenroda. He worked in 1886–1898 in Berlin and came in 1898 to Bydgoszcz where he met Heinrich Seeling when the latter was working on the project of Bydgoszcz theatre. Both were born at the same place in German empire. Knüpfer died in 1915 in Bydgoszcz.

In Bydgoszcz, he also designed at the same period the LEO factory producing shoes, at the corner of Kościuszko and Chocimski Street for the Weynerowski family. The house originally had a large glass commercial premise on the ground floor.

In 1917, the owner of the building was Boniface Cyrus, who ran here a department store and an exclusive fashion shop following the parisian mode, promoting fashions from abroad.

In the 1920s, Boniface Cyrus organized fashion shows for wealthy clients in luxurious places like the Civil Casino, the Municipal Theatre and, from the 1930s, in his own apartments on the first floor at Krasinski street 2.

At the end of 2017, a thorough refurbishing has been completed on both elevations of the building.

== Architecture ==
Franz Julius Knüpfer used forms of early classic modernism. Monumental forms are underscored by a combination:

- bossage on ground and first floors;
- vertical partitions using pilaster strips on the upper floors;
- friezes at the edges.

The facade on Krasiński Street features some additional architectural elements: two bay windows, the entry gate topped with a triangular pediment flanked by two bowl shaped sculptures, and curved balconies. The ensemble has been entirely rebuilt in the 1920s.

The building has been registered on the Kuyavian-Pomeranian Voivodeship Heritage List, Nr.601371 Reg.A/1090, on December 15, 1993.

== Gallery ==
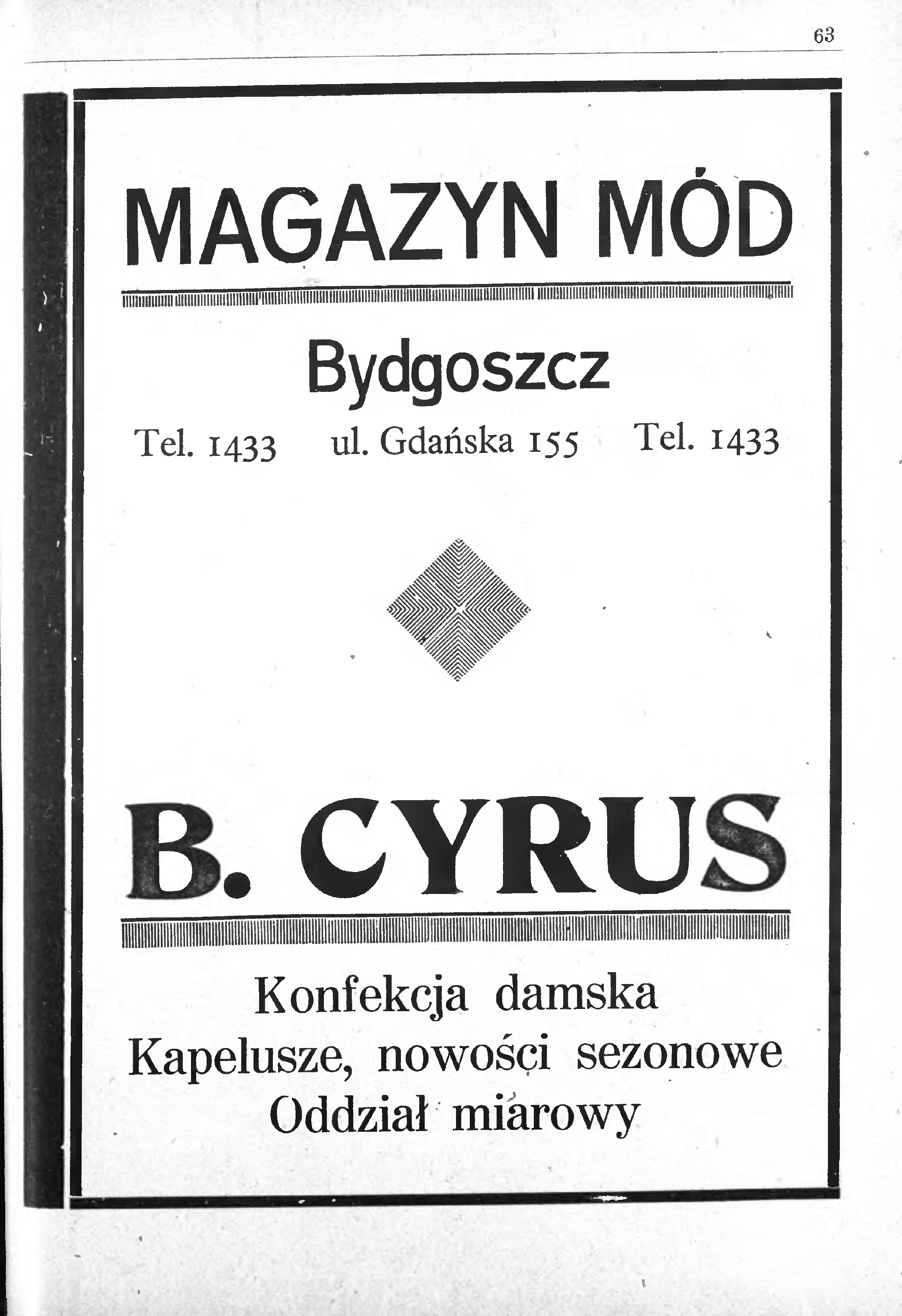
Advertising for Cyrus Shop in 1928

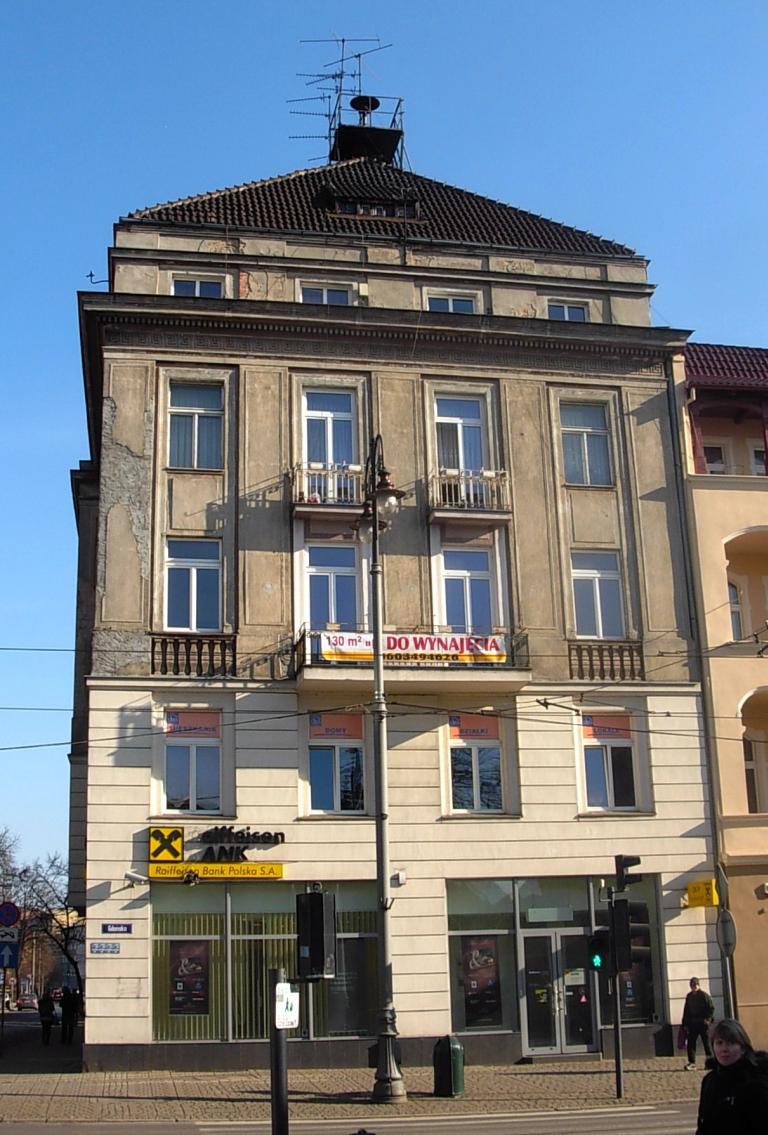
Facade on Gdańska street with friezes on the top

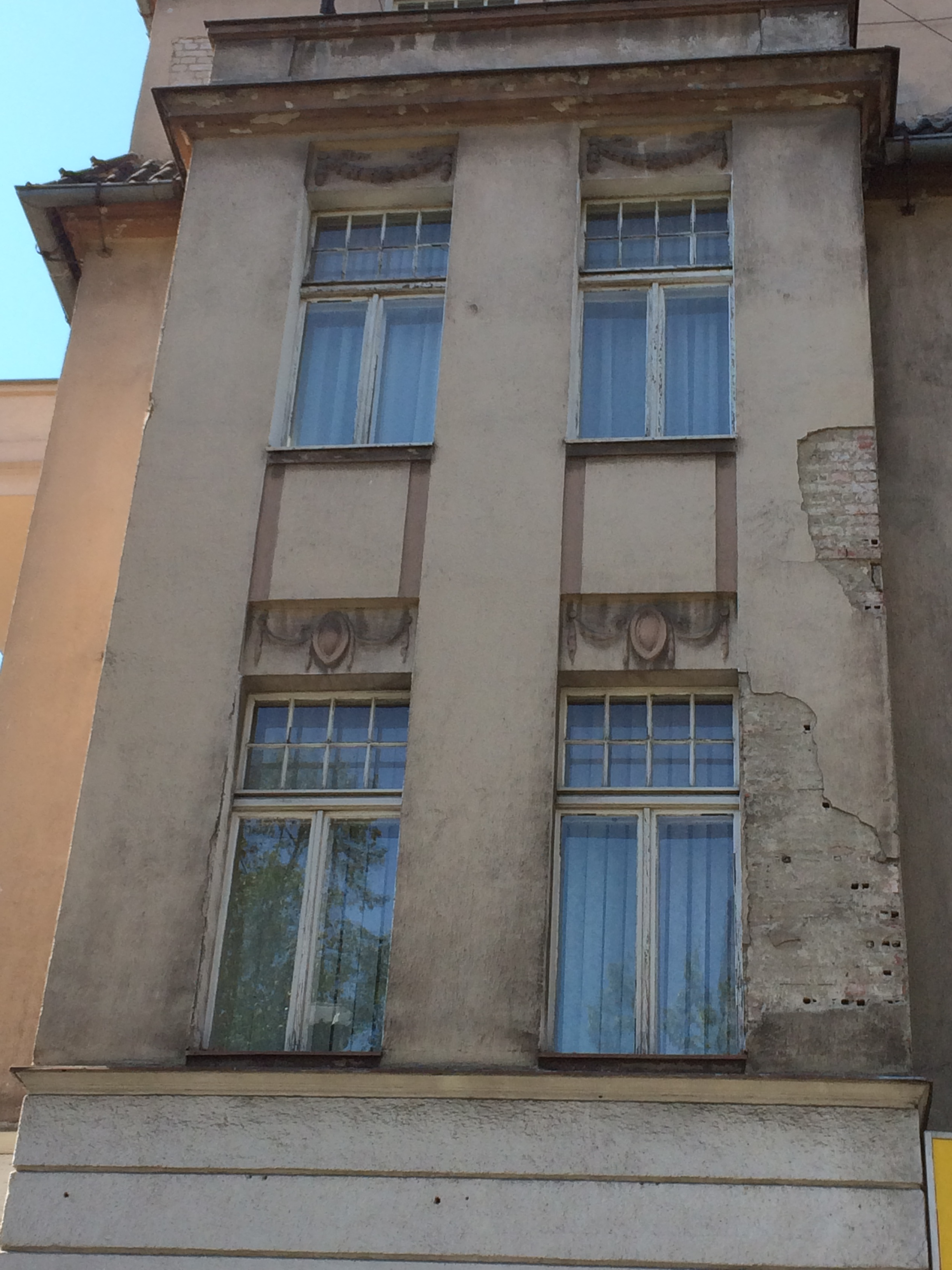
Bay window before restoration

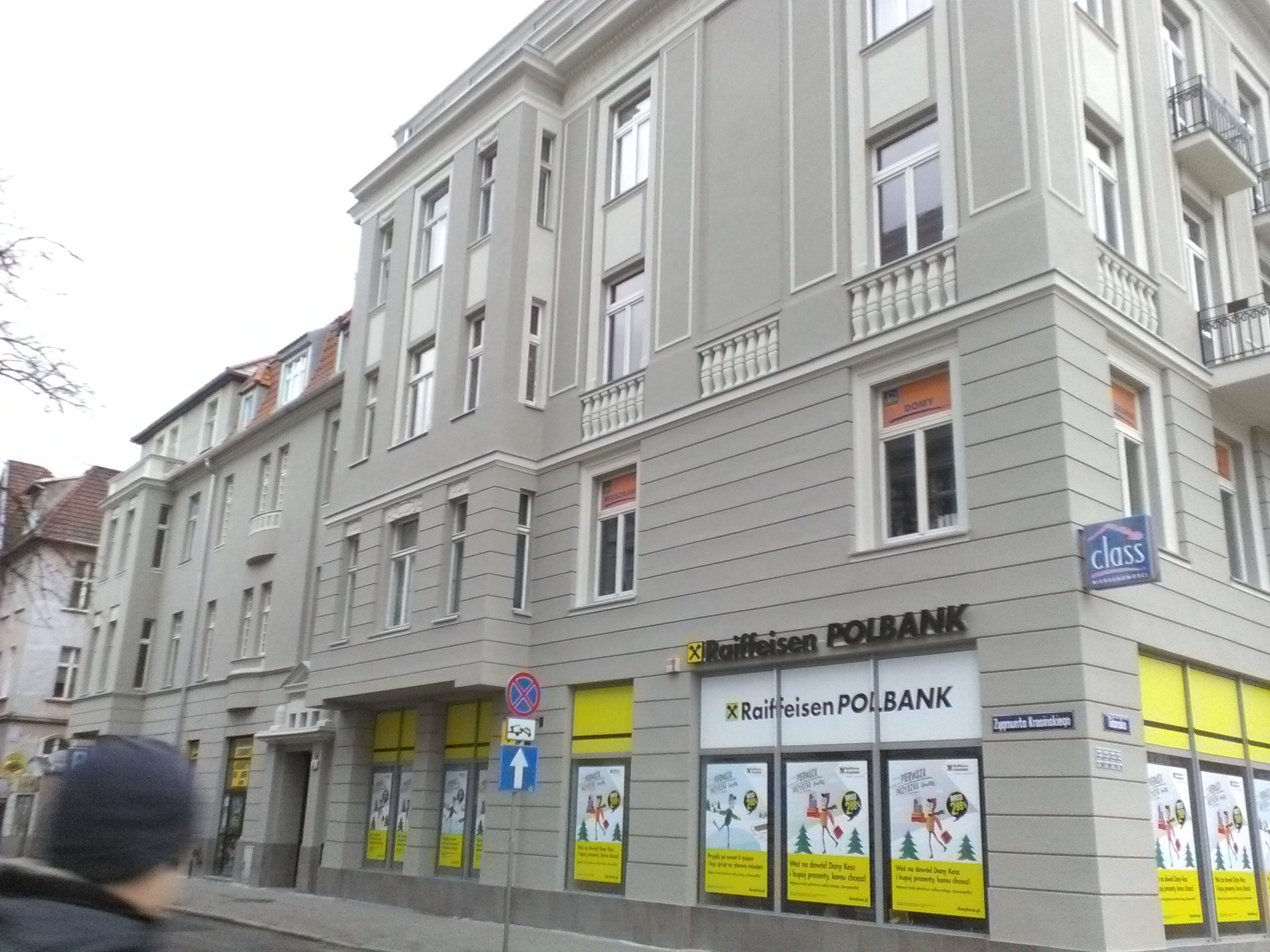
View from Krasiński street

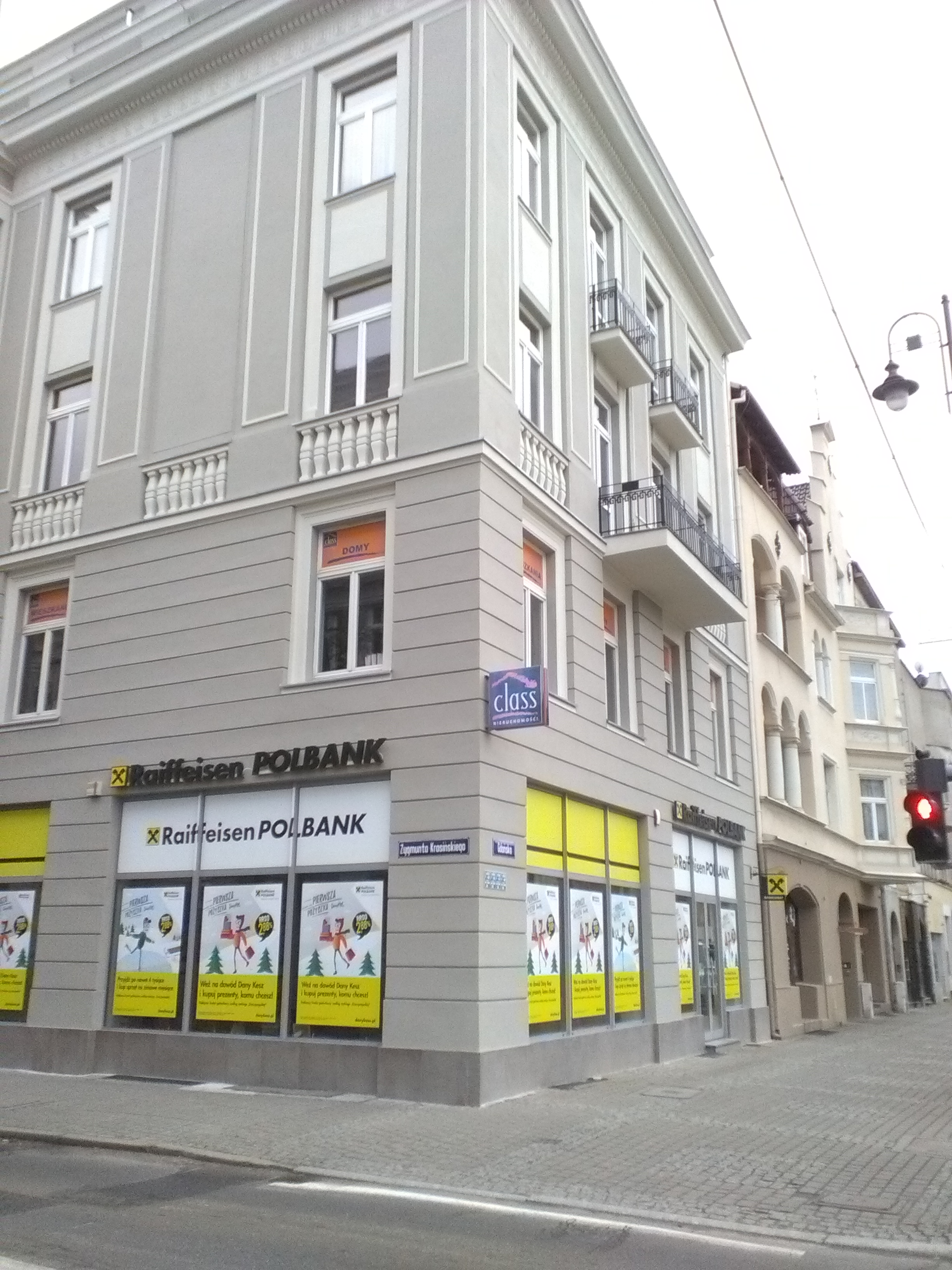
Corner view after renovation

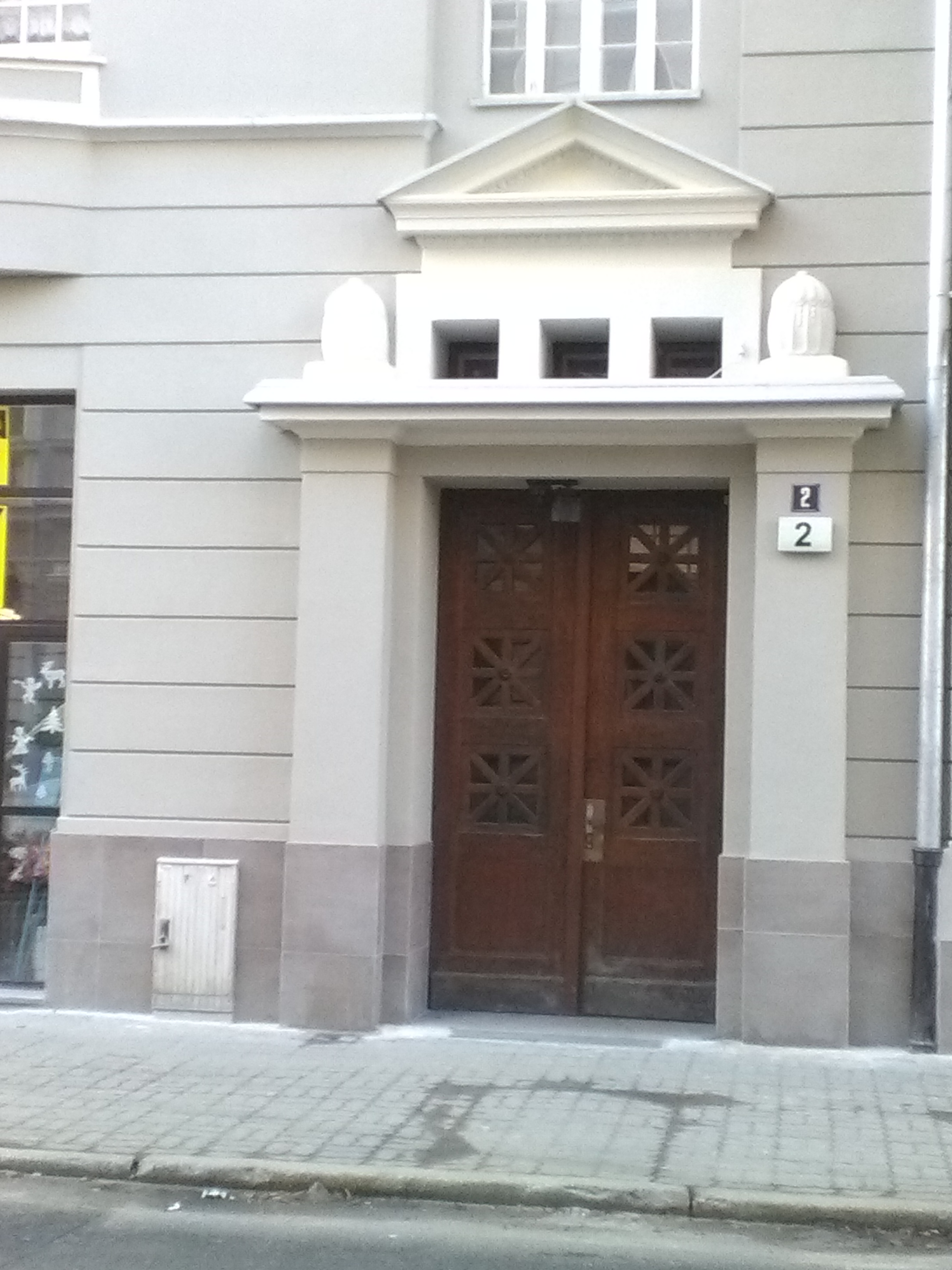
Gate detail

== See also ==
- Bydgoszcz
- Gdanska Street in Bydgoszcz
- Zygmunt Krasiński Street in Bydgoszcz
- (in Polish) Downtown district in Bydgoszcz

== Bibliography ==
- (in Polish) Bręczewska-Kulesza Daria, Derkowska-Kostkowska Bogna, Wysocka A. (2003). Ulica Gdańska. Przewodnik historyczny. Bydgoszcz: Wojewódzki Ośrodek Kultury w Bydgoszczy. ISBN 9788386970100.
