= Maess Anand =

Polish visual artist

- Born: 1982 (age 43–44); Warsaw, Poland
- Education: Academy of Fine Arts in Warsaw
- Known for: Drawing contemporary art
- Website: maess.eu

Maess Anand (née: Malgorzata Skrzypek, also called Maess; born in 1982 in Warsaw) is a Polish visual artist who works with drawing.

== Career ==
Anand graduated with MFA from Warsaw Academy of Fine Arts, Poland in 2007 and was recipient of a scholarship at the Escola Superior de Artes e Design in Porto, Portugal.

Maess Anand has presented work in, among others: The Drawing Center in New York, Wroclaw Contemporary Museum, Kasia Michalski Gallery in Warsaw, The Starak Family Foundation in Warsaw, Kibla in Maribor, Slovenia, Warsaw Austrian Cultural Forum, in conjunction with the Warsaw Autumn Festival, Polish Institute in Budapest, BWA - Municipal Art Gallery of Bydgoszcz Poland and IK Projects in Lima, Peru.

The artist has been awarded following fellowships: Yaddo in Saratoga Springs, Residency Unlimited in New York, Adam Mickiewicz Institute in Warsaw, LIA Leipziger Baumwollspinnerei in Leipzig,Virginia Center for the Creative Arts in Amherst, Virginia and International Studio & Curatorial Program in New York.

With Alex Urso, Maess Anand curated Biennale de La Biche; the smallest biennale in the world held on a deserted island near Guadeloupe. Biennale de la Biche held in 2017 has been reviewed by The Guardian,Hyperallergic, Ming Pao,Artnet,Art Review, and Observer.

Anand's work is held in the permanent collections of BWA - Municipal Art Gallery of Bydgoszcz in Poland and Imago Mundi Collection in Treviso, Italy.

== Bibliography ==
- „The Day is Not Enough, a few autobiographical stories ("Dzień jest za krótki-kilka opowieści autobiograficznych"), exhibition catalogue, ed. Ośrodek Kultury i Sztuki, p. 98–104, ed. Magdalena Ujma, ISBN 9788362290659, Wrocław, 2013
- "The Intuitionists", exhibition catalogue, Drawing Papers, ed. The Drawing Center, ISBN 9780942324877, p. 46 and 104, ed. Lisa Sigal and Margaret Sundell, New York, 2014
- "Fukt Magazine for Contemporary Drawing 8/9", ISBN 978-3-86895-088-5, Revolver Publishing, p. 136–139 and 174, Berlin, 2010
- What-is-not (Nietota) exhibition catalogue, Wroclaw Contemporary Museum / Galeria Miejska BWA, ISBN 9788361675037, ed Paweł Baśnik, Tomasz Brzeski (et al.), Wrocław-Bydgoszcz 2018
- Watroba, Joanna, Images of Female Intimacy in Contemporary Polish Art, Kolegium Miedzyobszarowych Indywidualnych Studiów Humanistycznych i Spolecznych Uniwersytetu Wroclawskiego:, Polish Academy of Sciences p 135, 2014
