= Litoral Province =

Litoral Province may refer to:

- Litoral Province (Equatorial Guinea)
- Litoral Province (Bolivia)

== See also ==
- Littoral Province (Cameroon)
- Littoral (disambiguation)
- Coastal Province
