= Literal =

Literal may refer to:

- Interpretation of legal concepts:
  - Strict constructionism
  - The plain meaning rule (a.k.a. "literal rule")
- Literal (mathematical logic), certain logical roles taken by propositions
- Literal (computer programming), a fixed value in a program's source code
- Biblical literalism
- Titled works:
  - Literal (magazine)
  - Three-issue series The Literals, in Fables comics franchise

== See also ==
- Literal and figurative language
- Literal translation
- Literalism (disambiguation)
- Littoral (disambiguation)
- Literally, English adverb
