= Teofil Ociepka =

Polish primitivist painter (1891–1978)

- Teofil Ociepka, Self-portrait, 1960
- Born: 22 April 1891; Janów Śląski, Poland
- Died: 15 January 1978 (aged 86); Bydgoszcz, Poland
- Education: Self-taught
- Known for: Painting
- Notable work: Basyliszek (Basilisk), 1964; Bestie w rajskim ogrodzie (Beasts in the Garden of Eden), 1961; Niedźwiedź z Saturna (Bear from Saturn), 1954
- Movement: Primitivist

Teofil Ociepka (22 April 1891 in Janów Śląski – 15 January 1978 in Bydgoszcz) was a Polish self-taught primitivist painter and Theosophist. Along with Nikifor, he was one of the best-known Polish primitivists.

== Early life ==
Ociepka started working at the age of 15 to financially support his family after his father's death. He took on a series of jobs, eventually becoming a power plant machinist at the Giesche coal mine in Katowice, where he worked until his retirement. He served as a soldier in the German Army during the First World War, and was introduced to occultism during that time, including through Athanasius Kircher's treatise on the Seventy Two Names of God. On the recommendation of his Swiss mentor, Philip Hohmann of Wittenberg, with whom he maintained steady correspondence, Ociepka became a member of the Rosicrucian Lodge and attained the status of Master of Secret Sciences. On Hohmann's direction, he organized a strong occultist community in Janów. He maintained contact with the Julian Ochorowicz Parapsychological Society of Lviv. He believed that he had a spiritual link with his master, who telepathically inspired his art.

== Artistic career and the Janowska Group ==
Hohmann persuaded Ociepka to start painting circa 1927. Ociepka painted until the 1930s, then taking a break and only returning to the craft in 1947. Several different reasons have been given for this break, including a "lack of understanding of his art", a cool reception by the curators of the Silesian Museum, or direct criticism of his work by Tadeusz Dobrowolski, a Polish professor of art history and museum curator.

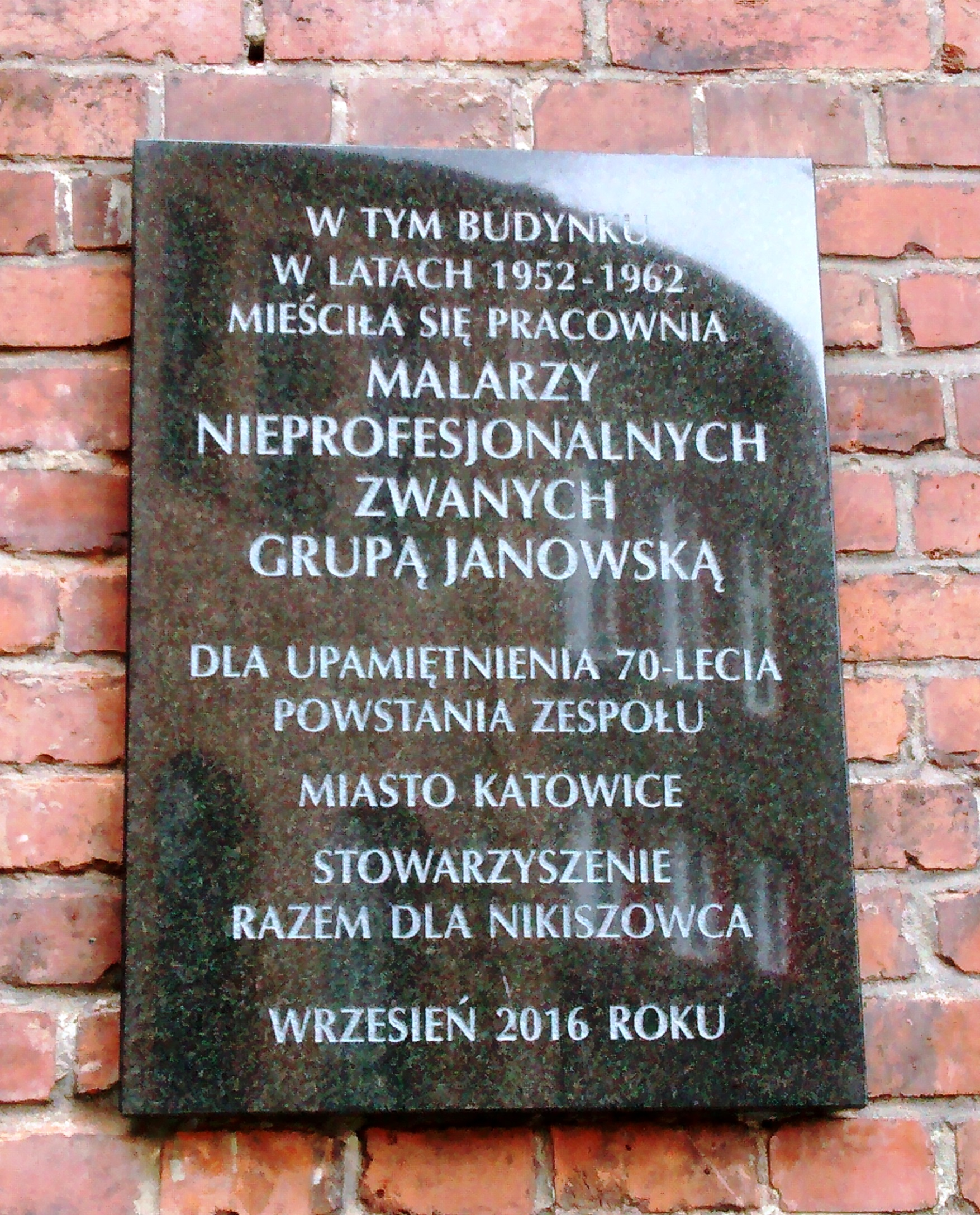
A plaque in Nikiszowiec commemorating the activities of the Janowska Group

Ociepka's art gained further prominence after the Second World War. A 1946 exhibition organized by trade unions focused on the artworks of coal miners, Ociepka included. Izabela Stachowicz also attended this exhibition and, impressed by Ociepka's work, organized a solo exhibition for him in Warsaw, promoting him as "Polish Douanier Rousseau." She was aided by her friends, Julian Tuwim and Jan Kott. The Warsaw exhibition significantly boosted Ociepka's popularity and artistic career. Stachowicz sometimes framed Ociepka in a manner that would be more conducive to the socialist ideology of the Polish People's Republic. Instead of focusing on his occult interests, she would emphasize his industrial employment and argue that his works represented "local legends".

Under Stachowicz's tutelage, Ociepka and other regional artists were able to cultivate their own artistic style and movement, which became known as the Janowska Group. Her support, along with that of Otton Klimczok, allowed the Janowska Group to thrive in a post-Stalinist Eastern Bloc. Its works did not need to fully adhere to the principles of socialist realism, in notable contrast with most other prominent art produced in Poland at that time. While Ociepka saw himself as part of the Group, he declined invitations to paint with others, preferring to create his art in the solitude of his home.

== Artistic style, themes, and influences ==
Ociepka saw his painting as God's mission, and so tried to portray absolutist themes, including the struggle between good and evil. Ociepka felt that he had not just the gift of seeing and portraying the world in a particular way, but also the "moral responsibility" to share this vision with the world. Many of his paintings are also heavily influenced by Rosicrucian ideology, though, in addition to his esoteric focus, he was also heavily inspired by Catholic and Silesian thinking. He strongly opposed materialism, seeing it as a force of evil in sharp contrast with his religiously inspired way of seeing the world.

Later, his works depicted themes from fairy tales, legends, and lives of miners. They are characterized by wealth of imagination and bright, rich colors.

== Later life ==
As he was approaching his retirement, he received a letter from Julia Ufnal from Bydgoszcz, who expressed a deep interest in metaphysics and spoke of a "moral and spiritual command" to take care of the artist. Ociepka and Ufnal married in 1959, after which the artist started to distance himself from occultism and cut off contact with some of his friends in the art world. In 1969, the couple moved to Bydgoszcz.

== Selected works ==
- Miner
- Hydra
- Lion from Saturn
- Bear from Saturn
- Three Headed Dragon
