= Pomeranian Arts House =

Pomeranian Arts House in Bydgoszcz
- Polish: Pomorski Dom Sztuki w Bydgoszczy
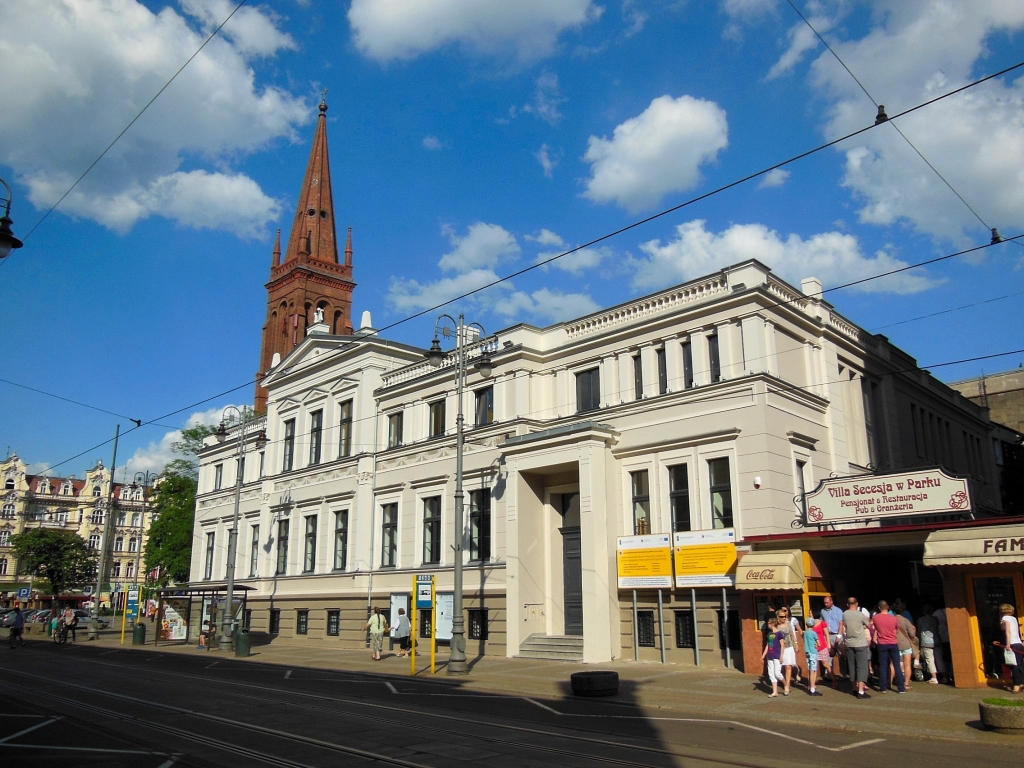
- Pomeranian Arts House in Bydgoszcz, view from Gdanska street
- Interactive map of the Pomeranian Arts House in Bydgoszcz area

General information
- Type: Tenement
- Architectural style: German Historism
- Classification: Nr.601297-Reg.A/1116, 18 November 1993
- Location: 20 Gdańska street, Bydgoszcz, Poland, Poland
- Coordinates: 53°7′35″N 18°0′14″E
- Construction started: 1886
- Completed: 1887
- Renovated: 1908 & 1965
- Owner: 1st owner Casino Association „Wypoczynek" ("Recreation")
- Landlord: Opera Nova Bydgoszcz, Music Academy of Bydgoszcz

Technical details
- Floor count: 2

Design and construction
- Architect: Gustaw Reichert

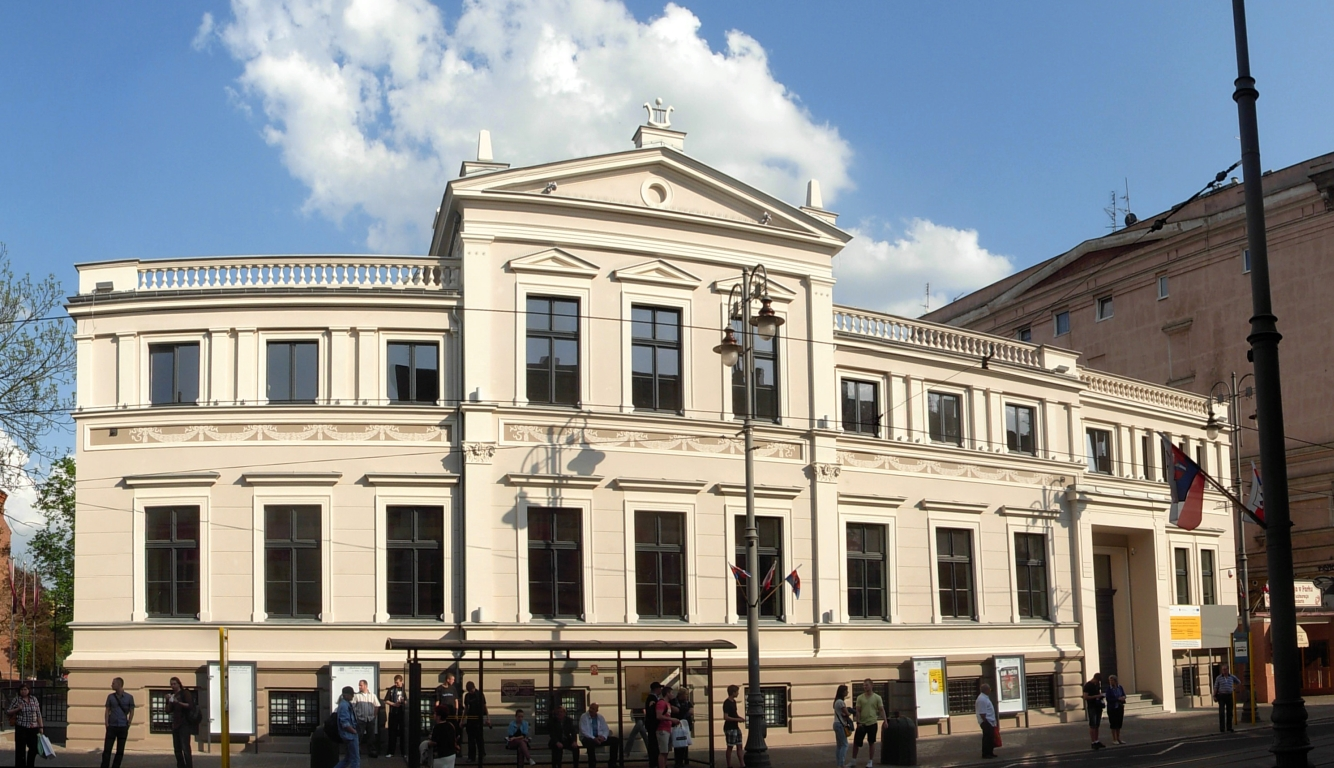
Building facade on Gdanska street

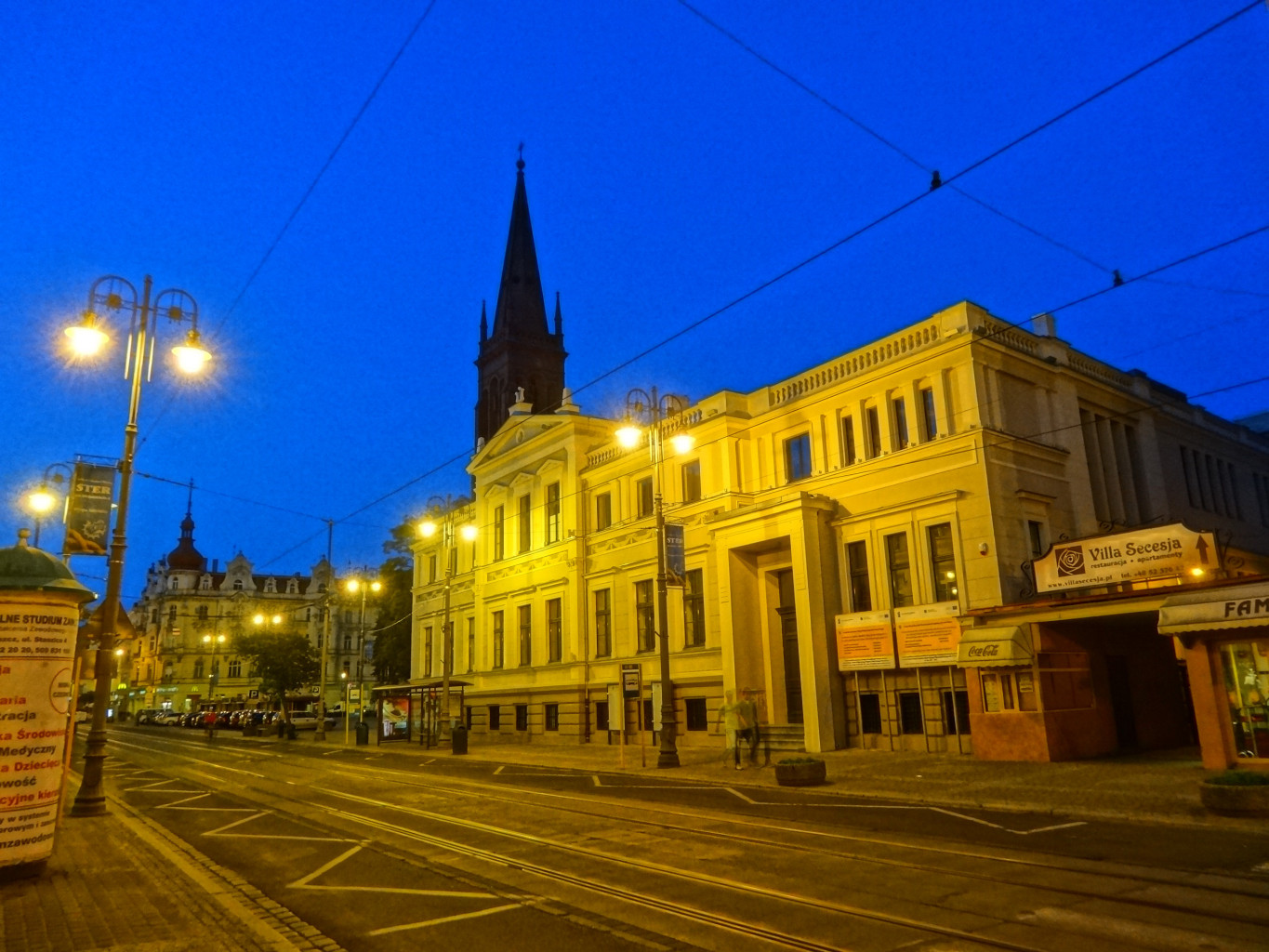
By night

The Pomeranian Arts House is a building of cultural and historical significance located at 20 Gdańska Street in Bydgoszcz, Poland. It has housed chronologically:

- the seat of German cultural associations (1887-1939);
- the seat of Pomeranian unions and the Bydgoszcz Operetta & Opera Music Theatre (1945-2006);
- until 1982 the seat of the National School of Fine Arts.

Since 2006, it is owned by the Academy of Music in Bydgoszcz.

== Location ==
The building stands on the eastern side of Gdańska Street near Freedom Square and St Peter's and St Paul's Church.

== History ==
=== Prussian period ===
The building has been erected in 1885 to offer a facility for German associations in Bromberg after Prussian partition. They included the "Recreation Society" (German: Erholungs-Verein) and the company "Civil Casino" (German: Civilkasino). At the same time the edifice housed the newly created Casino Society "Rest" in Bydgoszcz (German: Kasino - Gesellschaft "Erholung"), aimed at bringing together the German social elite in Bromberg, particularly senior officials, officers and urban bourgeoisie.

In 1886, a subsidy from the central budget contributed to the start of the construction of the Society House. For this purpose a separate plot of Regency Park was bought, located at 20 Gdańska Street, in the immediate vicinity of St Peter's and St Paul's Church. The construction lasted two years (1886-1887) and eventually cost 1400,000 Marks, while it was initially estimated at 97,000 Marks. The building was designed by architect Gustav Reichert, in the style of German Historicism, referring to classicism forms. In 1908, the southern part of the two-storey building was extended on the basement dependence and its own entrance. The builder was Emil Haydemann, master bricklayer: on the ground-floor the extension comprised a brick wing with its own entrance, covered with a lean-to roof. The activities in the Society House were run until June 1939, focused on the organization of social and cultural life (art and science) of German elite. The building, in 1902, was also used by the German Society of Arts and Sciences in Bydgoszcz, trade merchants, singing bands. In December 1904, the Jubilee celebration of the Bromberg Horse Grenadier Regiment was held in the Society House, attended personally by Emperor Wilhelm II.

=== Interwar period ===
Early after the re-birth of Poland, in 1920, the building housed the "Kresowy Boarding House", a care facility for boys from the eastern territories of the former Republic of Poland (or Kresy), together with another facility at 11 Sienkiewicza. It moved in March 1921, to a former German orphanage today at 32 Chodkiewicza street.

During interwar, the building was still property of "Deutsche Kasinogesellschaft" and was a cultural and entertainment center. A stylish garden area was located on the north of the place, for café and concerts. The facility was used till 1934 by residents from all socio-cultural societies, regardless of their nationality. In the 1920s, the director Meinhard opened at 19 Gdanska a small movie theatre called Apollo Central Theater - Polish: Teatr Centralny Apollo. As a result, Polish branch of the Society for the Encouragement of Fine Arts Polish: Towarzystwo Przyjaciół Sztuki w Bydgoszczy installed its seat in the building on 1 September 1921, and started presenting exhibitions of contemporary graphics and sculpture. It also held concerts by Bydgoszcz Music Society, Bydgoszcz Conservatory of Music (Polish: Bydgoskie Konserwatorium Muzyczne) and Municipal Conservatory of Music (Polish: Zespół Szkół Muzycznych w Bydgoszczy). Choirs from both Polish school children and German speaking schools happened there. Among many concerts in the edifice hall, one was played by pianist Feliks Szymanowski, then Bydgoszcz resident, brother of composer Karol Szymanowski. The building (then Civil Casino) housed the first official concert inaugurating the Bydgoszcz Music Society created at the initiative of Ludwik Regamey on 5 December 1922. City orchestra, chamber ensembles and soloists from Poznań, Gdańsk or Berlin similarly performed in the garden.

After accession to power of Hitler in Germany, the attitude of German authorities in Bromberg hardened, and forbade activities of Polish organizations in the building, which exclusively served German and Nazi organizations. Anti-Polish activity by the German minority was re-aroused by the decision of the Polish municipal authorities on 15 June 1939 to close the Society House and rename it to "Social House" (Polish: Dom Społeczny): the announcement was met with violent protests in Bydgoszcz by German and Nazi partisans.

=== Pomeranian Arts House ===
In 1945, thanks to the artist Marian Turwid, then President of the Pomeranian branch of the Association of Polish Artists and Designers, the building was dedicated to Arts. Polish art expert Jerzy Remer, on behalf of the Commission for Reconstruction supervised the work on the building. On 7 May 1946, during the celebration of the 600th anniversary of the city of Bydgoszcz, has been unveiled the Pomorski Dom Sztuki (Pomeranian Arts House): it housed a concert hall, a permanent showroom for arts -BWA (Polish: Biuro Wystaw Artystycznych), a local club for Arts associations and a Plastic Arts Centre (Polish: Społeczne Ognisko Artystyczne). The building was the seat of Pomeranian Art workshops for writers, musicians and artists from all domains.

Between 1945 and 1982, the premises were mainly used by Leon Wyczółkowski's State School of Art established in 1945, which has been directed by Marian Turwid from 1945 to 1972. The Pomeranian Arts House also hosted the Pomeranian Symphony Orchestra from 1946 to 1953. In addition, until the construction of Polish Theatre in Bydgoszcz in 1949, many events took place in the edifice. In 1956, the Bydgoszcz Opera company was established there. Over the next years, the building had many users, but was never really suited for the musical theater business.

As a consequence, in 1956, the project of remodeling the building and adapt it to the needs of the opera was studied. Architects planned to build a scene with the necessary elements, an auditorium for 600 people and to create a moat for the orchestra, by extending the Arts House the East, on a plot from the Park Casimir the Great. This study failed due to technical and financial resources it required: it had been calculated that reconstruction would cost as much as 50% of the cost of construction of a brand new building. Thus emerged the idea of erected an independent, modern opera house building in the bend of the Brda river.

In 1965, once the permanent showroom for arts -BWA has been constructed, the southern wing built in 1908 was demolished. From 1972, the building housed a small stage of Opera Nova, while larger performances (operas, operettas and ballets were held in Polish Theatre in Bydgoszcz. After 1982, with Leon Wyczółkowski's State School of Art moving to a building at Konarski street, the City Opera became the sole legal owner of the Pomeranian Arts House.

=== Building of the Bydgoszcz Music Academy - "Feliks Nowowiejski" ===
In 2006, the edifice has been taken over by the Bydgoszcz Music Academy - "Feliks Nowowiejski". Since 2008, the facility is being modernized to fit the needs of the Academy of Music:

- the basement houses warehouses for instruments, dressing rooms and technical rooms;
- the ground floor is occupied by a 100-seat concert hall with room for orchestra and choir;
- upstairs are located classrooms.

== Architecture ==
The edifice is a detached, two-storey building with basement, and has got the characteristics of classicism. The facades are characterized by a uniform and scare use of architectural details, putting the accent on horizontal and vertical layouts. They have been designed on a bossage decorated pedestal and cornice-topped with a chain pattern.

The building front part is an avant-corps, topped by a gable with a triangle tympanum. Avant-corps corners are pilaster-shaped. The top floor of front elevation has attic style balustrade. At the gable top is placed a lyre, symbolizing music and poetry, in relation with the cultural function of the building.

Building interiors originally comprised a main concert hall and a ballroom. At the beginning of the 20th century, the hall room had 9-metre-high loggias and galleries: it could accommodate a thousand people. Upstairs, the building housed a small auditorium on the first floor, a library, club rooms, a restaurant and wine cellar. Little of the original design has survived in today's layout.

The building has been put on the Pomeranian heritage list (Nr.601297-Reg.A/1116) on 18 November 1993.

== Gallery ==
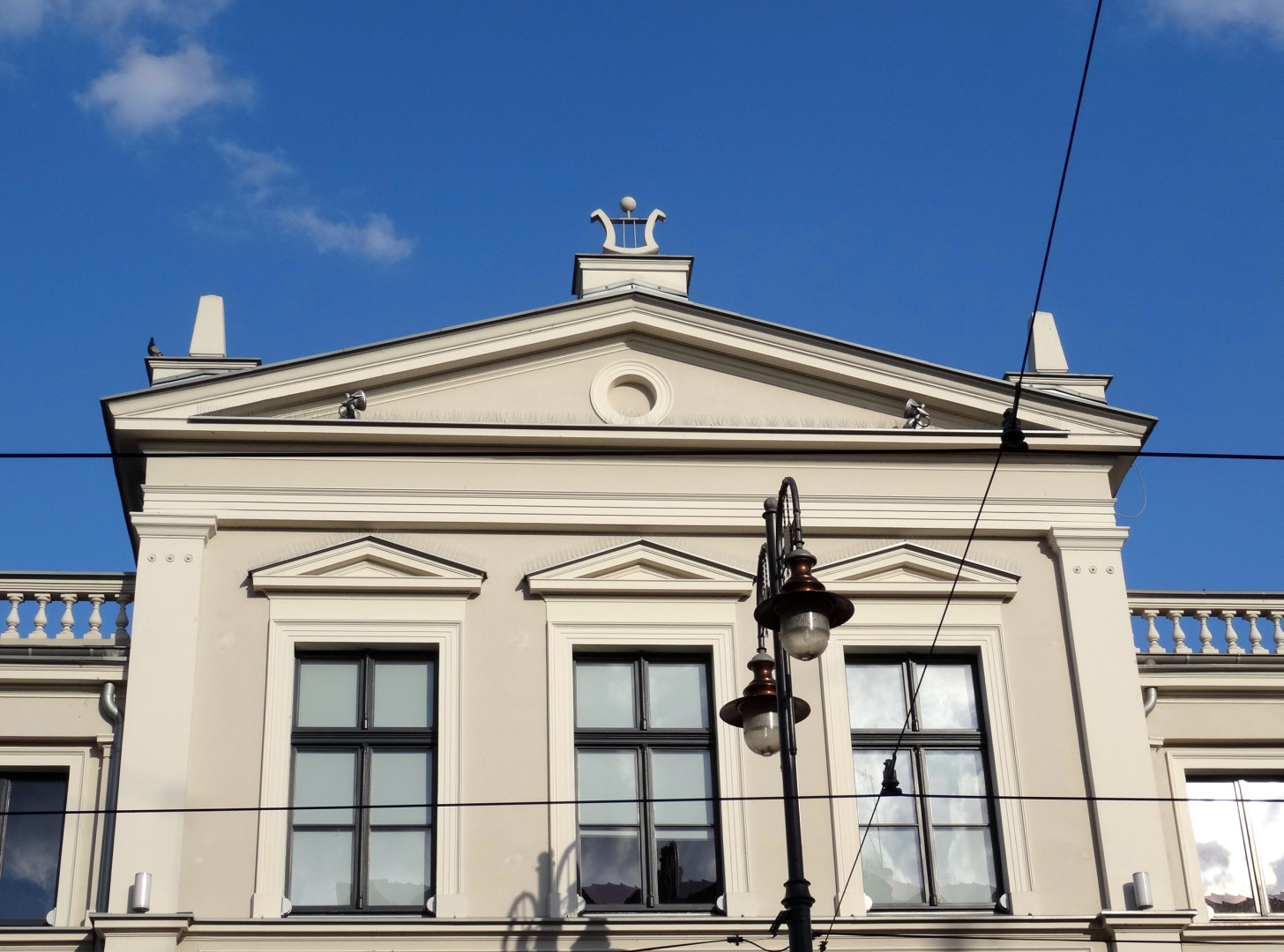
Detail of the pediment

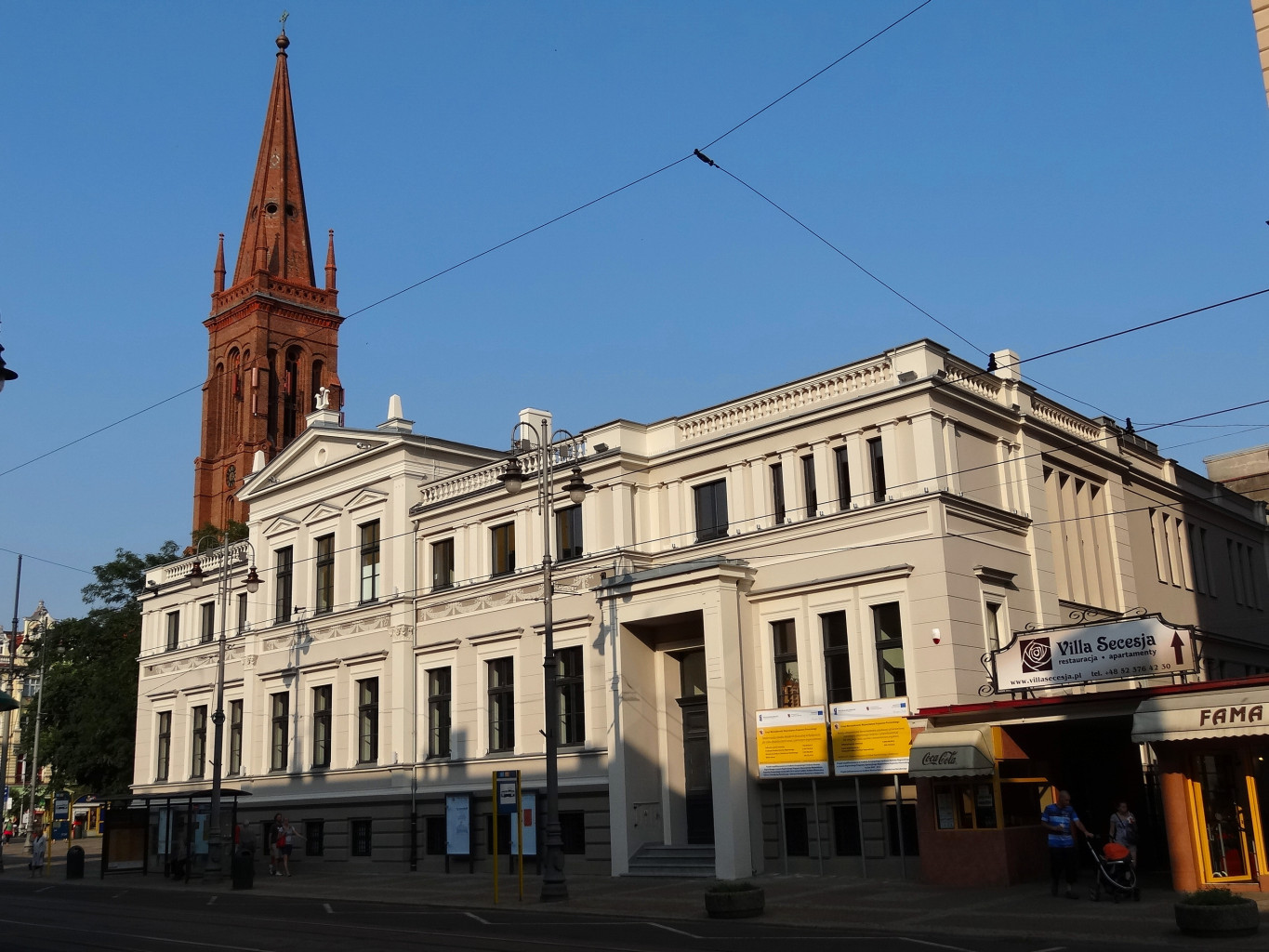
The edifice with St Peter's and St Paul's Church in the backdrop

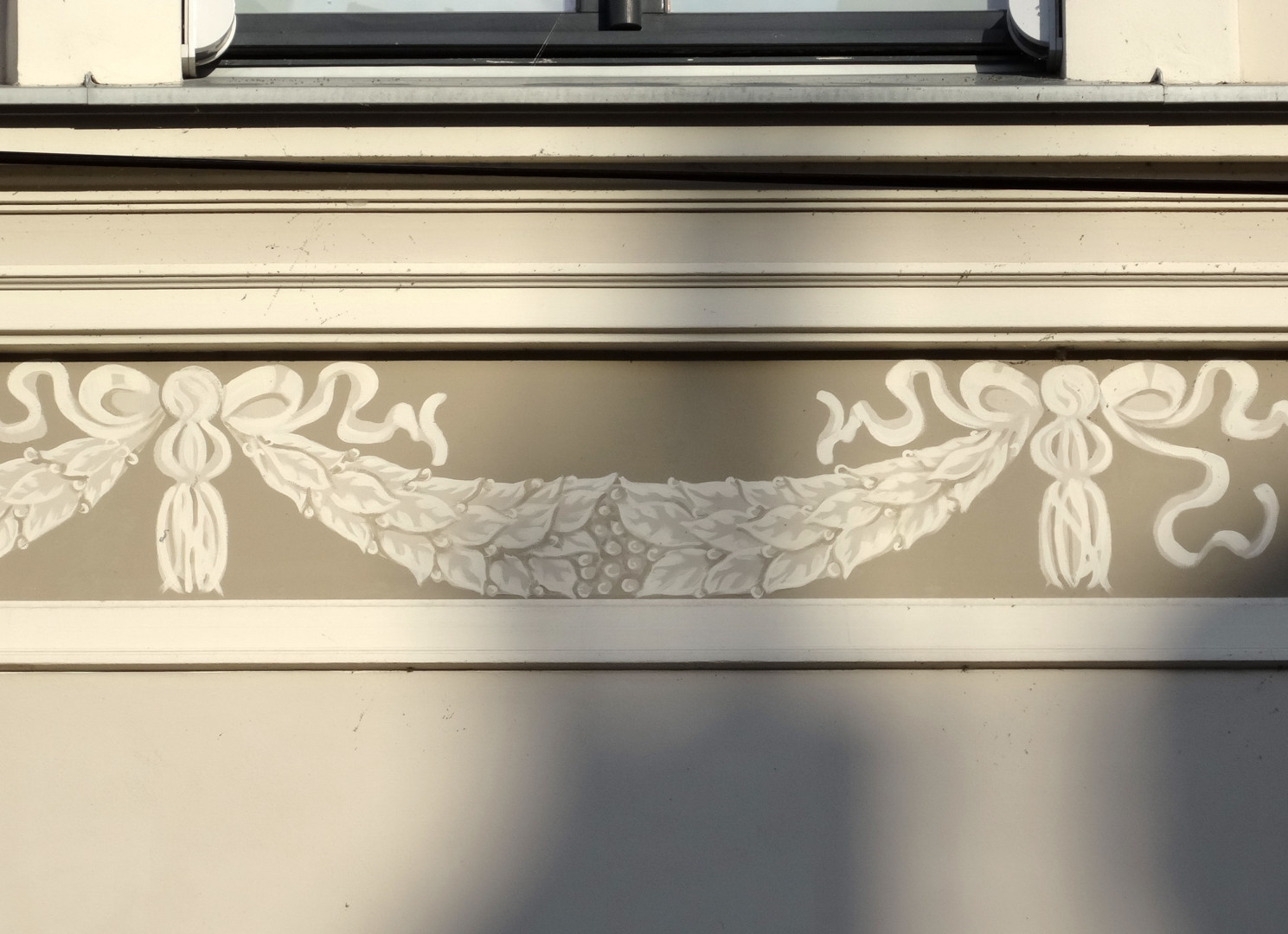
Detail of a facade painted motif

== See also ==
- BWA - Municipal Art Gallery of Bydgoszcz
- Bydgoszcz
- Bydgoszcz Music Academy - "Feliks Nowowiejski"
- Gdanska Street in Bydgoszcz
- Ludwik Regamey
- Opera Nova Bydgoszcz
- Pomeranian Philharmonic
- Zygmunt Felczak

== Bibliography ==
- (in Polish) Bręczewska-Kulesza Daria, Derkowska-Kostkowska Bogna, Wysocka A. (2003). Ulica Gdańska, Przewodnik historyczny. Bydgoszcz: Wojewódzki Ośrodek Kultury w Bydgoszczy. ISBN 9788386970100.
- (in Polish) Derkowska-Kostkowska, Bogna (1998). Kasynowe Towarzystwo "Wypoczynek" w Bydgoszczy i jego dom związkowy. Materiały do dziejów kultury i sztuki Bydgoszczy i regionu. Zeszyt 3. Bydgoszcz: Pracownia Dokumentacji i Popularyzacji Zabytków Wojewódzkiego Ośrodka Kultury w Bydgoszczy.
- (in Polish) Prus Zdzisław, Weber Alicja (2002). Bydgoski leksykon operowy. Bydgoszcz: Kujawsko-Pomorskie Towarzystwo Kulturalne Bydgoszc. ISBN 8385327622.
