= Casimir the Great Park =

Urban park, 17th century, Bydgoszcz, Poland

Coordinates: 53°7′32″N 18°0′18″E

Park Casimir the Great
- Park Kazimierza Wielkiego
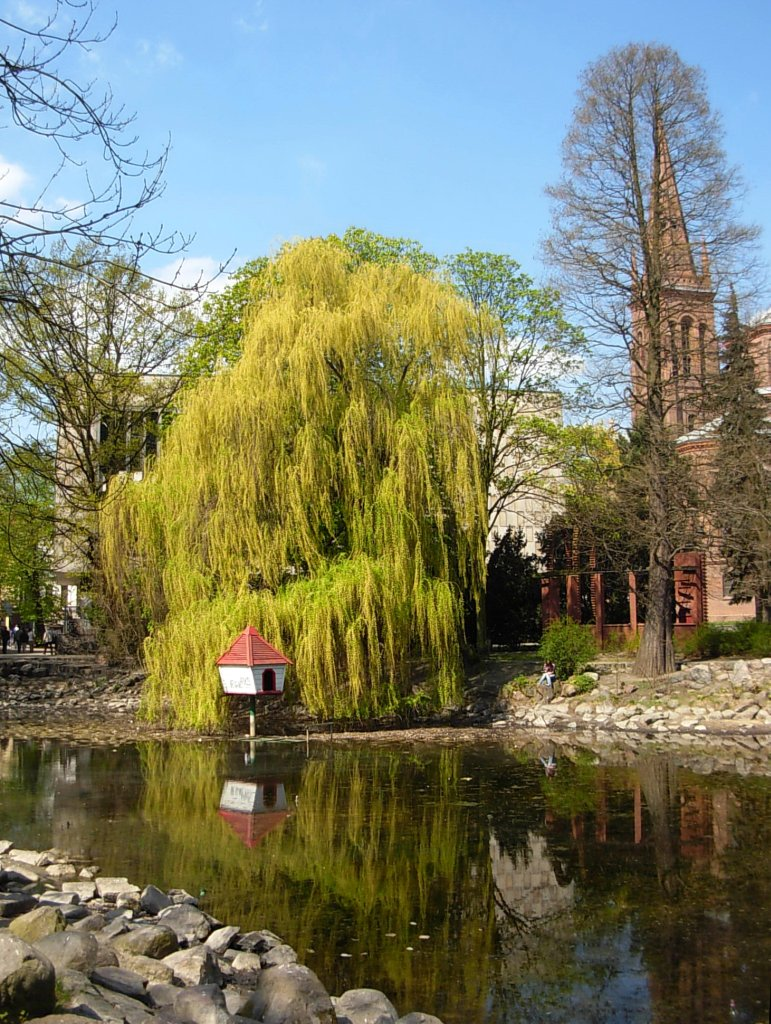
- Park Casimir the Great
- Interactive map of Park Casimir the Great
- Type: Urban park
- Location: Bydgoszcz, Poland
- Area: 2,24
- Created: 1615
- Status: Open all year

Casimir the Great Park is the oldest park in Bydgoszcz, Poland, covering an area of 2.24 ha. The park is located in a central part of downtown Bydgoszcz, bordered by Gdańska Street, Konarski Street, Jagiellońska street and Freedom Square. Its area represents a rectangle of 100m by 200m.

== History ==
Park Casimir the Great is a fragment of the much larger park of the Order of Saint Clare in Bydgoszcz dating back to the first half of the 17th century. Sisters of Poor Clares came to Bydgoszcz in 1615, and after the construction of the monastery (now one of the city museum buildings), the adjacent garden was created and organized. It can be accessed today through an alley at 3 May Street 3: its surface is approximately 3.5 hectares. The original garden was not only ornamental, but also practical: a fish pond, a kitchen garden, an orchard with medicinal plants were part of it.

After secularization of the order by the Prussian authorities, the garden belonged to the regional office of Bydgoszcz, which turned it into a three hectare "District Park" (German: Regierungs Garten) in 1835, forbidden to city residents. In 1861 two swans and carp were purchased for the two ponds.

In the 1900–1901, the park was renovated, and its area reduced to 2.4 ha. The work was led by Paul Meyerkamp. After completion on October 1, 1901, the park, now property of the municipal and urban park administration (German: Stadt Park), was made available to the city public.

On 23 July 1904, on the northern edge of the park close to Freedom Square, the monumental foutain "The Deluge" was inaugurated. It is a work by the Berlin sculptor Ferdinand Lepcke. The masterpiece sculpture has been integrated and connected with the surrounding park in a seamless manner.

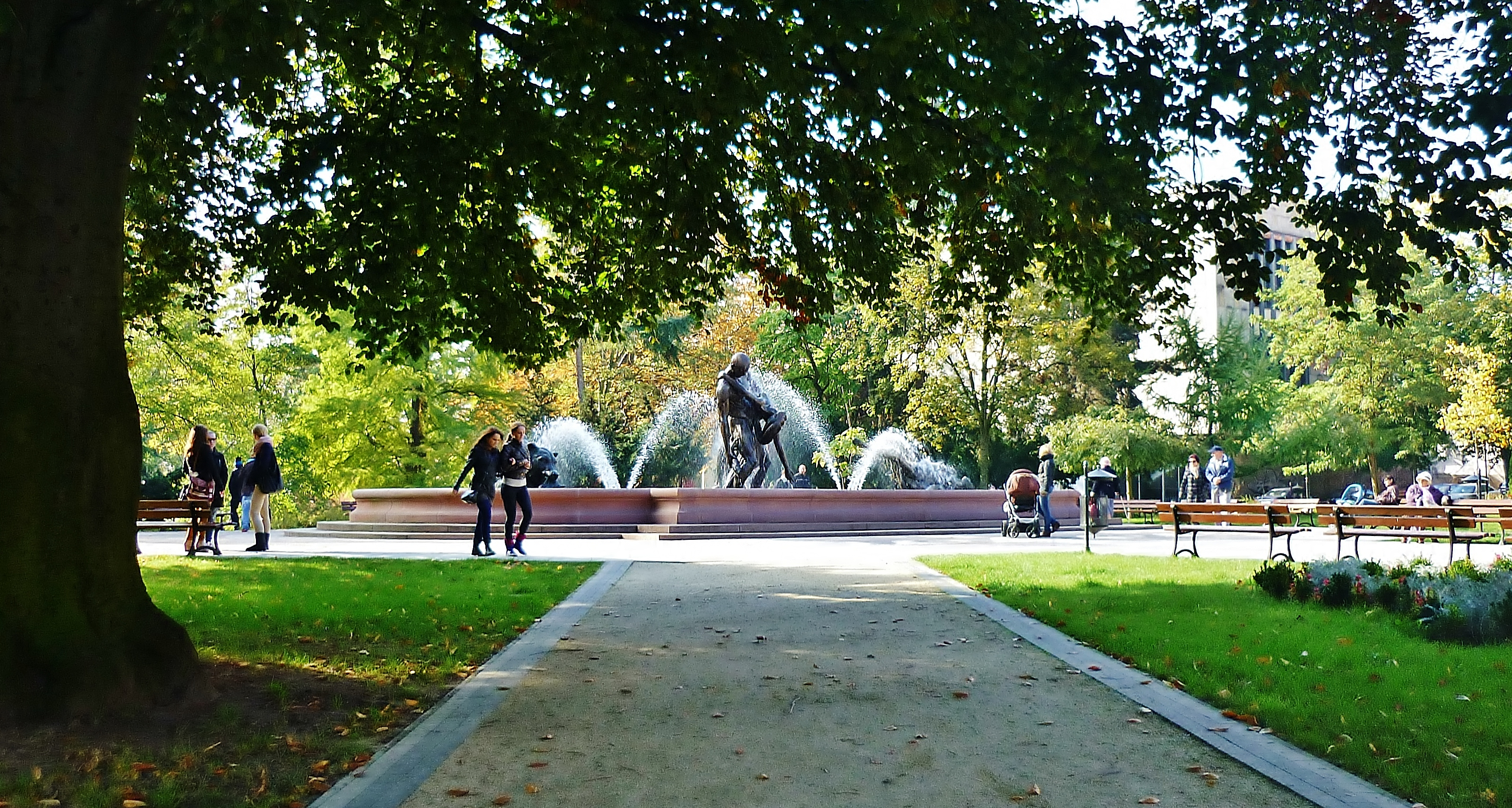
View with Fountain "The Deluge" in reconstruction, 2012

In 1938, 69 species of trees and shrubs were growing in the park, many dating back to 17th and 18th century. The largest specimens were, among others, several pedunculate oaks with trunk circonference 390 to 400 cm and 50 giant wych elm specimens.

At this time, many species were growing in the park, including park include: elms, sessile oaks, pyramidal English oaks, ailanthi, horse-chestnuts, sugar maples, maple trees, birches, Siberian peashrubs, purple hazels, purple European beeches, Kentucky coffeetrees, grandiflora hortensias, kerrias, magnolias, American sycamores, peony bushes, black locusts, robinias, snowberry bushes, large-leaved limes, small-leaved limes, yews, pines, black pines, Caucasian walnuts, baldcypresses, London planes and other trees and shrubs.

During the German occupation, a lot of trees were cut down to build shelters, mainly during 1944. Generally speaking, trees of the park have been destroyed by war artillery. In January 1943 Nazis looted the fountain "The Deluge" for war purposes.

In 1946, to celebrate the 600th anniversary of Bydgoszcz an exhibition about Pomeranian Industry, Craft and Trade was held in the park and in the three schools located at Konarski Street. The exhibition, convened from 14 July to 15 September, housed 1085 exhibitors, and was visited by 120000 people during the first three weeks. A temporary outdoor amphitheatre had been set up for the occasion. The latter was replaced by permanent one, built in 1956 in the nearby Wincenty Witos Park.

In the 1990s and the beginning of 21st century, the park Casimir the Great has undergone a restoration, culminating by the reconstruction of fountain "The Deluge" to its original shape in 2014.

== Successive appellations ==
Through its history, the park had been given the following names:

- 1615 - 1835, Garden of Poor Clare sisters
- 1835 - 1901, Regency Park (German: Regierungs Garten)
- 1901 - 1920, Municipal Park (German: Stadt Park)
- 1920 - 1939, Park Casimir the Great (Polish: Park Kazimierza Wielkiego)
- 1939 - 1945, Park Victoria (German: Viktoriapark)
- Since 1945, Park Casimir the Great (Polish: Park Kazimierza Wielkiego).

Patron of the park is king Casimir the Great (1309–1370) who gave civic rights to Bydgoszcz city and ordered the building of the Castle of Bydgoszcz in 1346.

== Rare trees ==
The park features the following rare tree species:

- cypresses,
- conical oaks,
- London planes.

In the park Casimir the Great seven specimens are identified as Polish Natural Monuments, and twelve others are located in the close vicinity.

Polish Natural Monuments in the park Casimir the Great and its surroundings

Nr	Type	Location	Nr of trees	Notes
1.	Quercus robur	Central portion of the park	3	Trunks diameters: 320, 358 and 374 cm
2.	Quercus robur – pyramidal variety	Near south pond	1	Trunk diameter: 274 cm
3.	Taxodium distichum	Beside the ponds	2	Trunks diameters: 225 and 324 cm
4.	Ulmus laevis	On the alley along Freedom Square, in the northern part of the park	1	Trunk diameter: 300 cm
5.	Platanus × hispanica	At the Church of the Holy Apostles Peter and Paul	1	Trunk diameter: 351 cm
6.	Ginkgo biloba	Gimnazium Street 11	1	Trunk diameter: 168 cm
7/8.	Ginkgo biloba- double sprouted	Corner of Konarski Street and Jagielloński Street	1	Trunks diameters: 91/151 cm
9.	Ailanthus altissima	In front of the Regional Office building	2	Trunks diameters: 304 and 375 cm
10.	Oak	In the park	1	Trunk diameter: 300 cm Registered on February 27, 2019

== Gallery ==
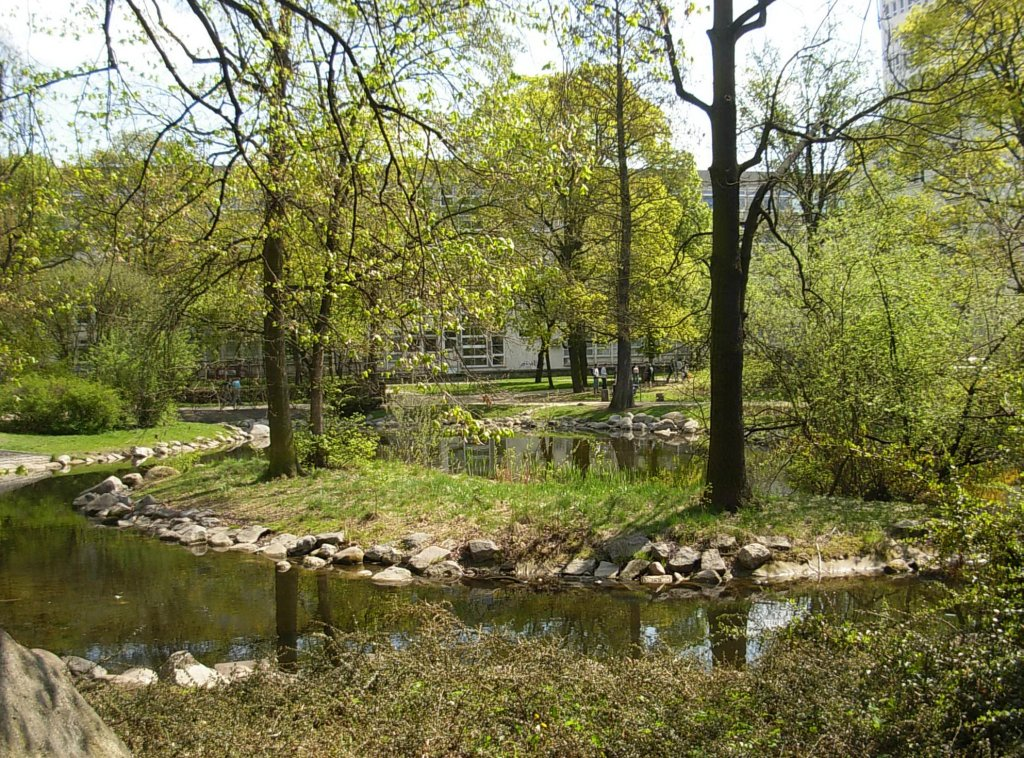
Island in the pond

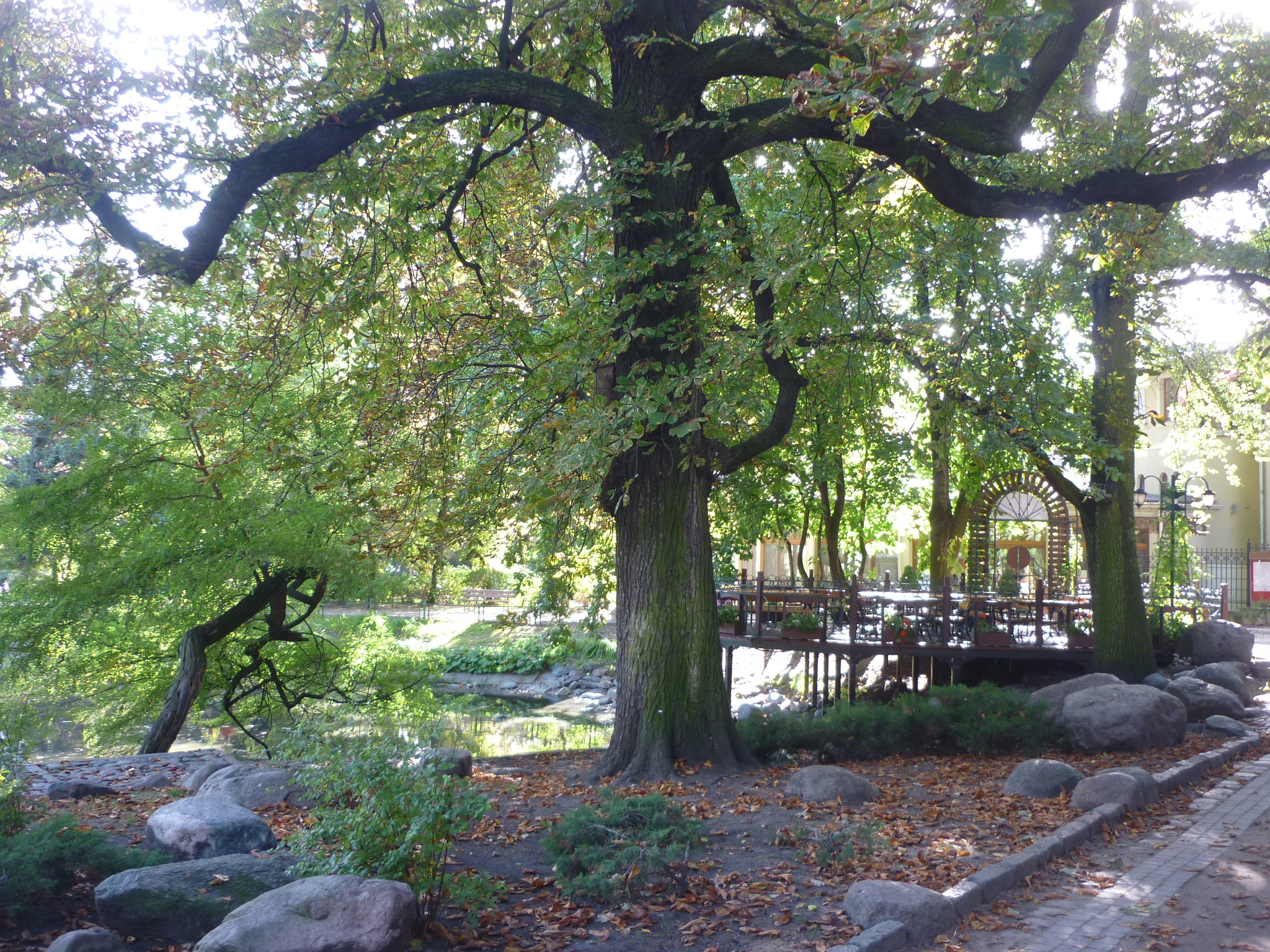
View on Park Casimir Bydgoszcz

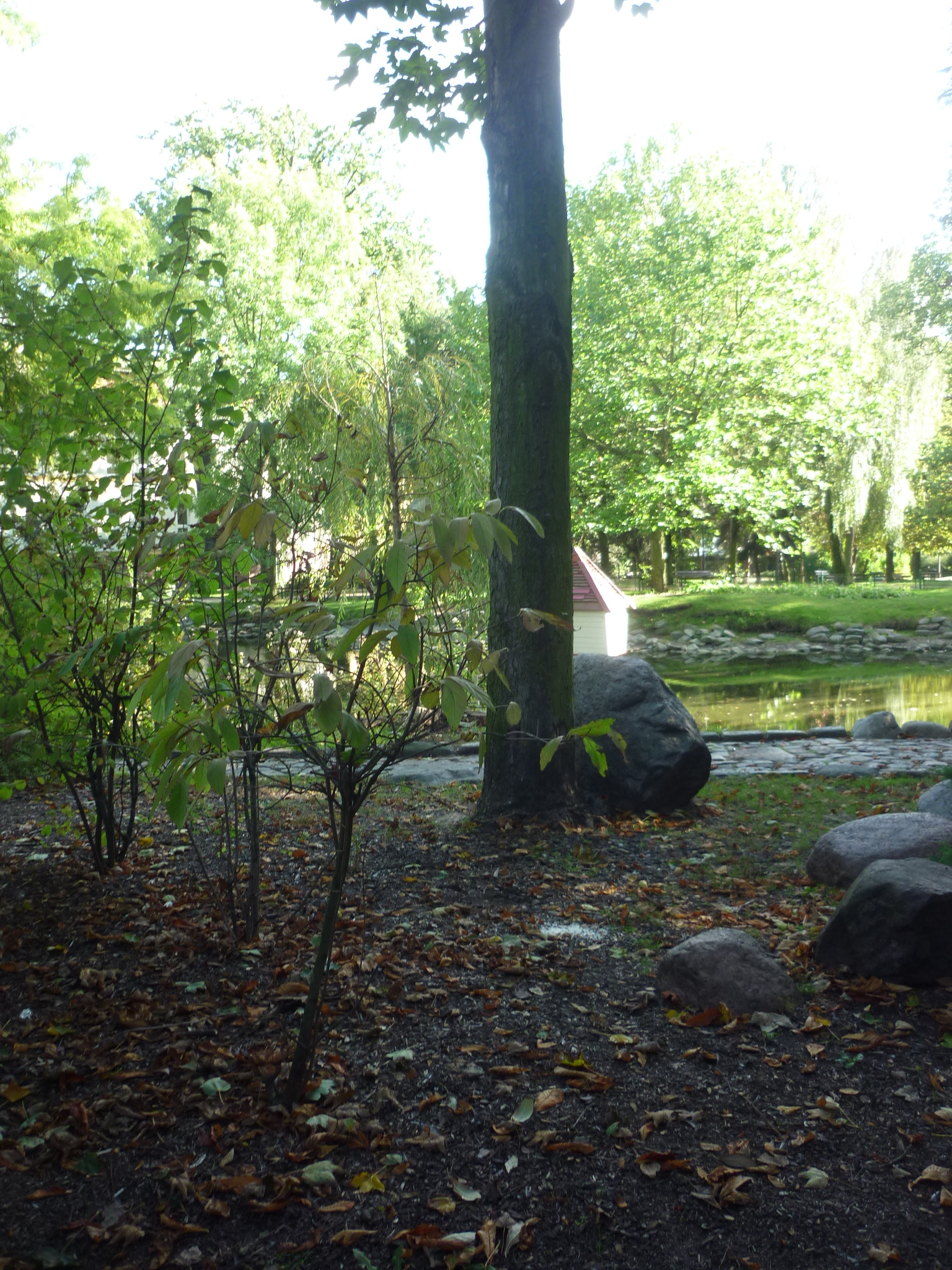
View of Park Casimir Bydgoszcz

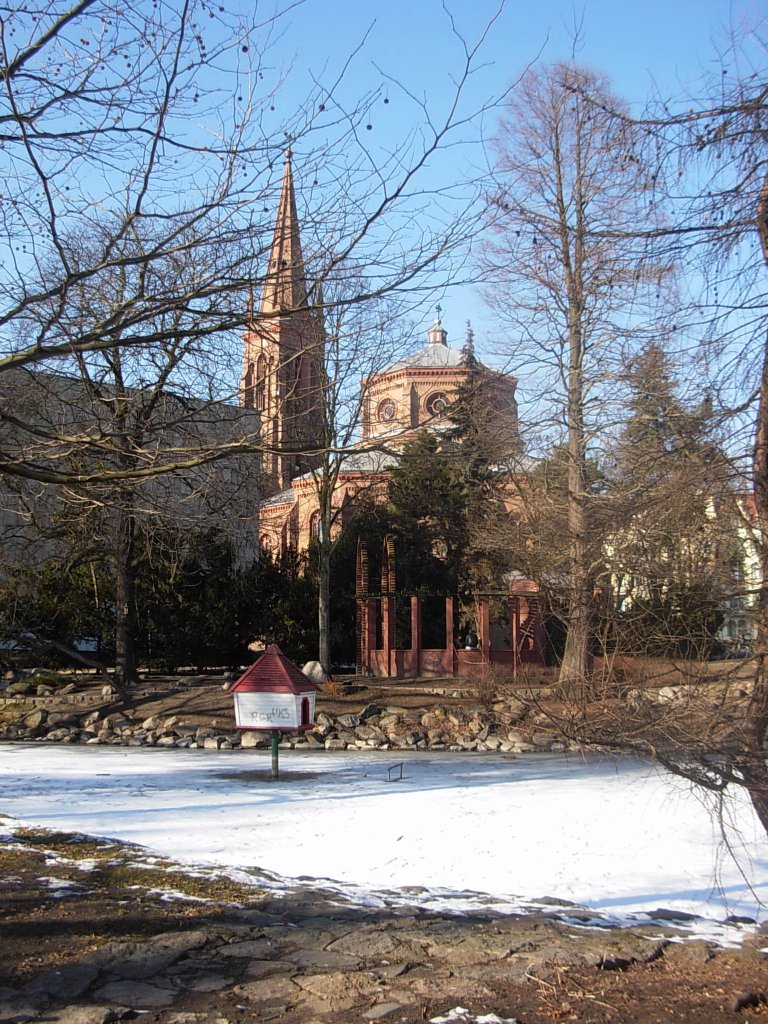
In March

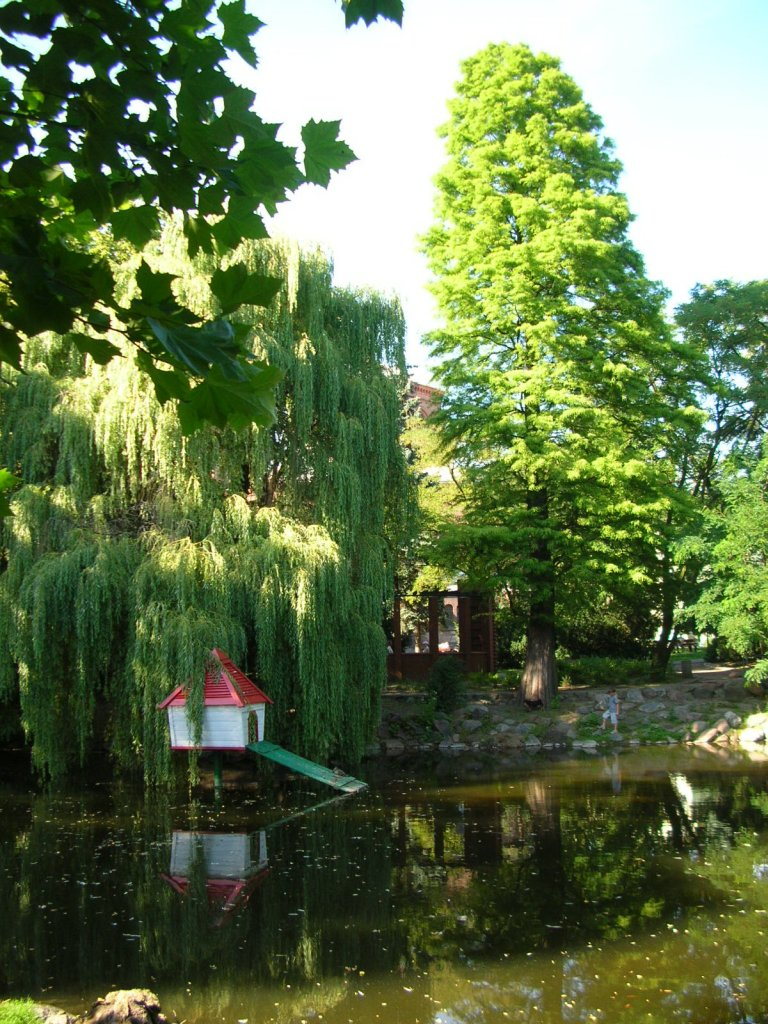
In May

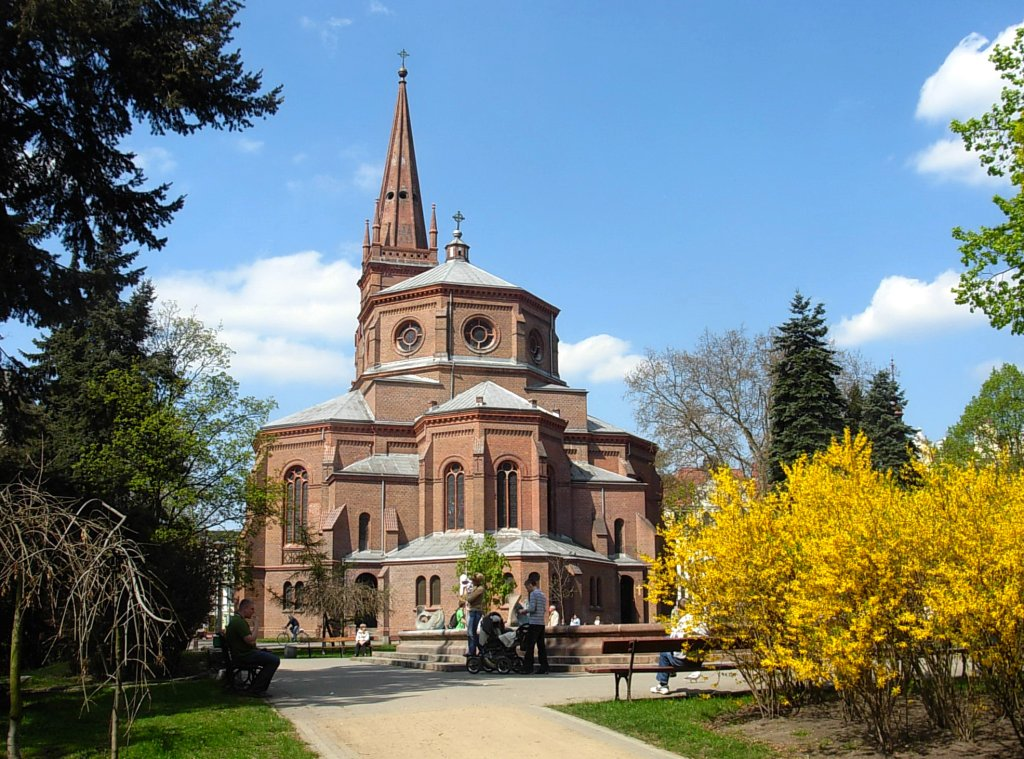
At the Church of the Holy Apostles Peter and Paul

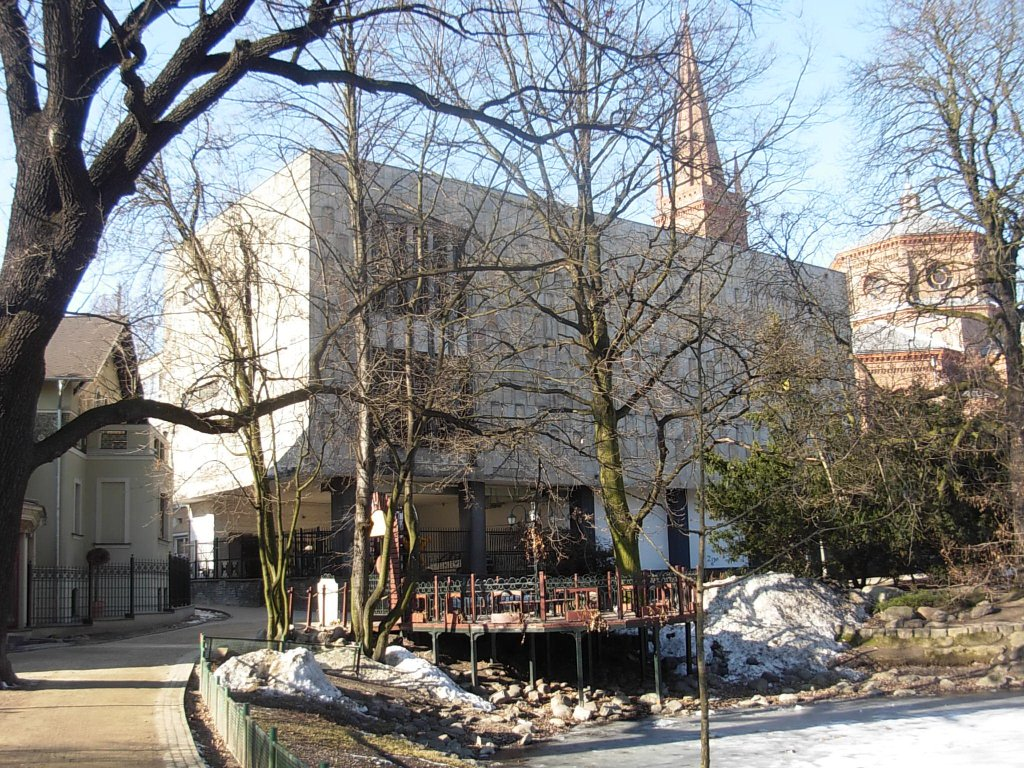
View from BWA Gallery

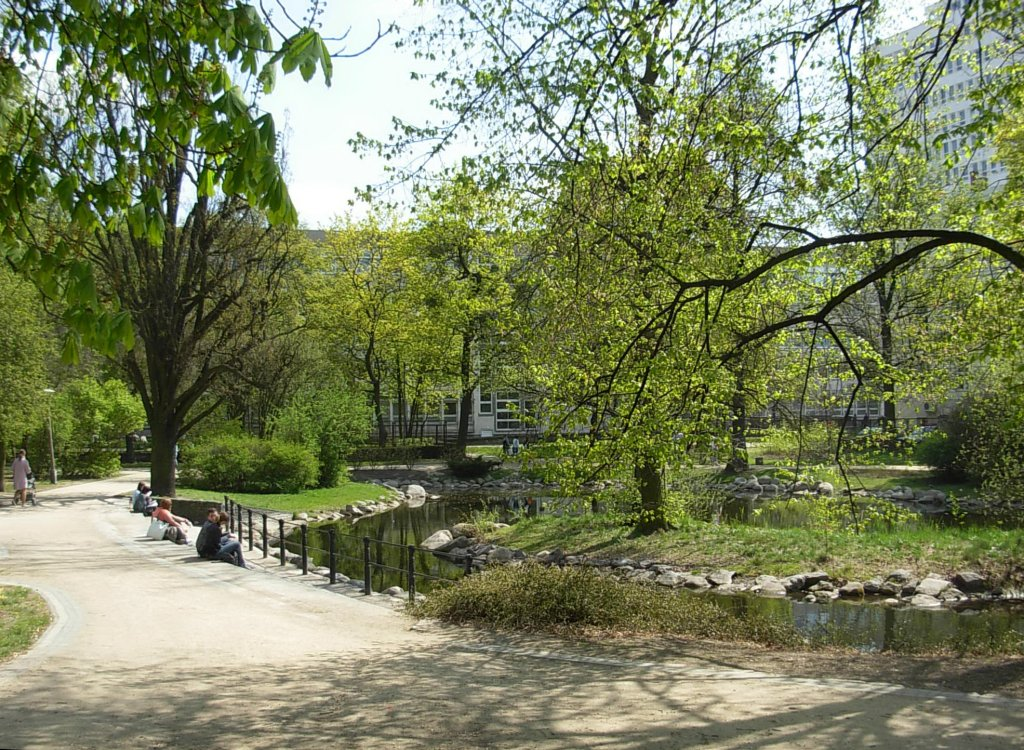
Southern pond

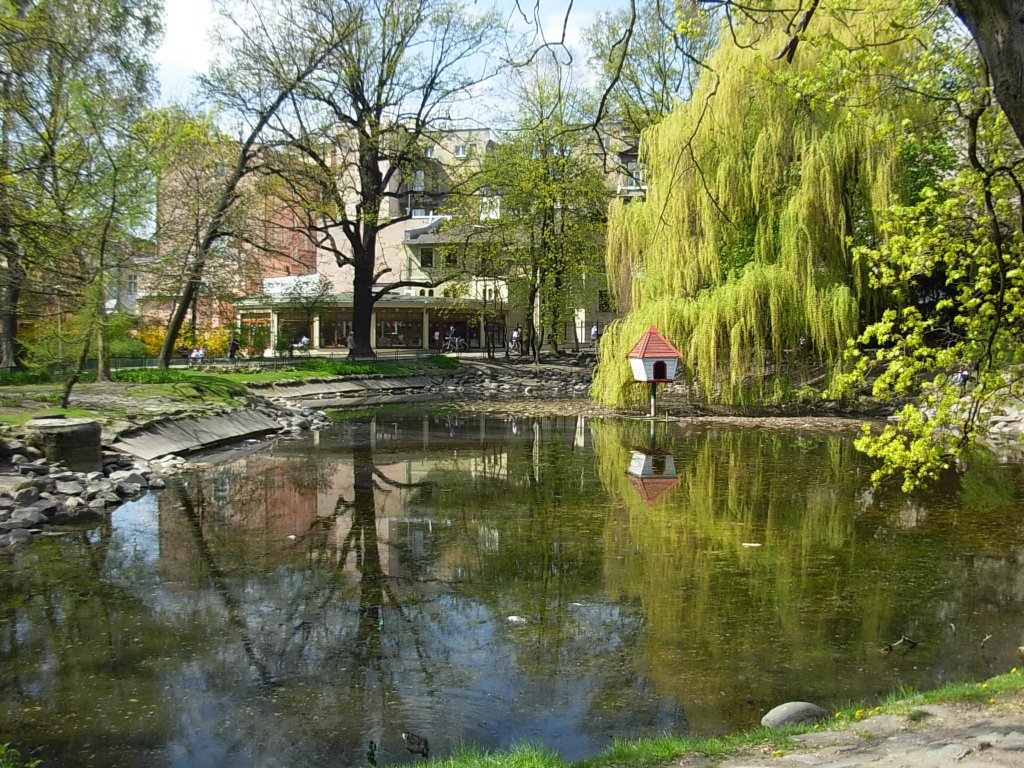
Northern pond

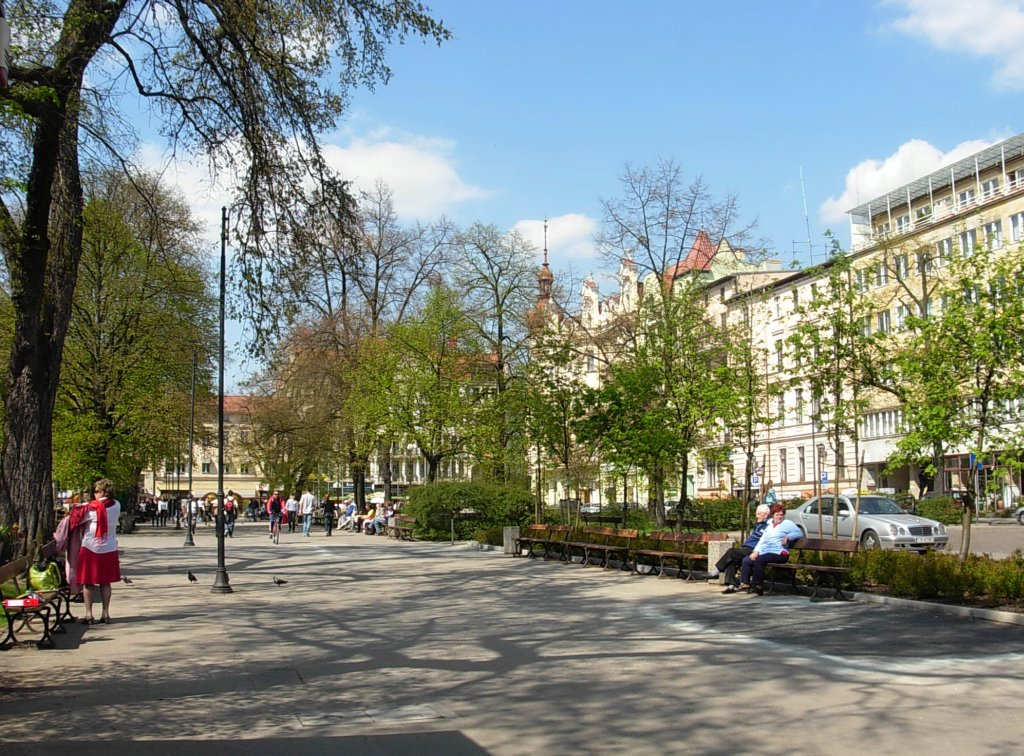
Alley on Freedom Square

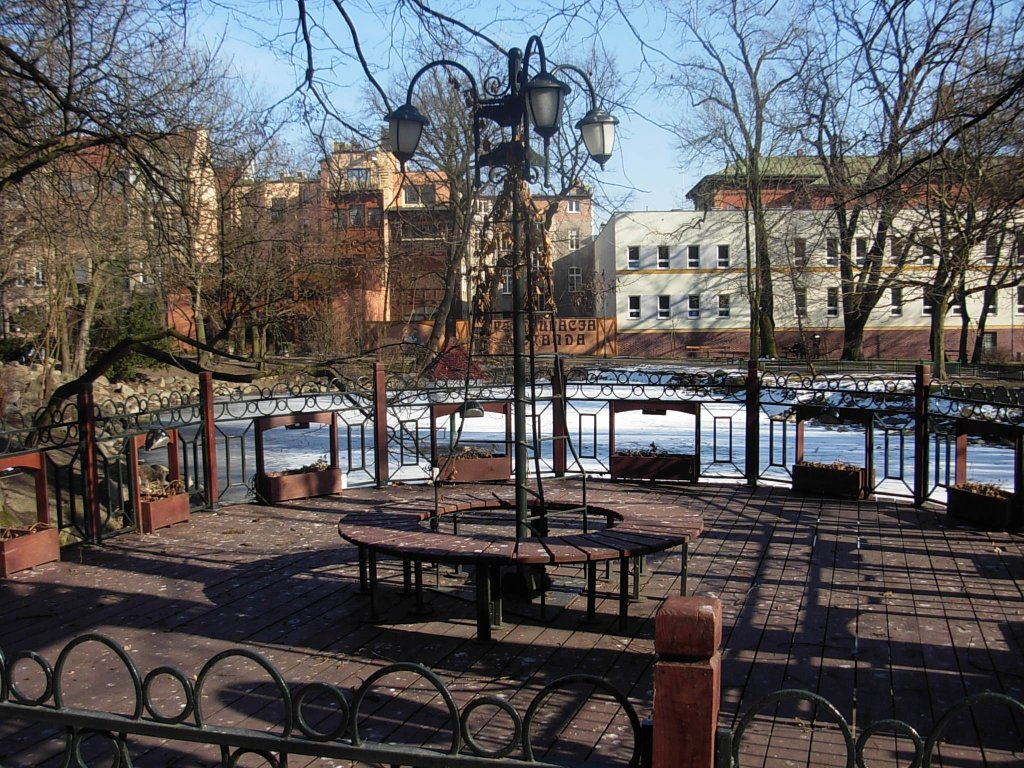
Northern pond in winter

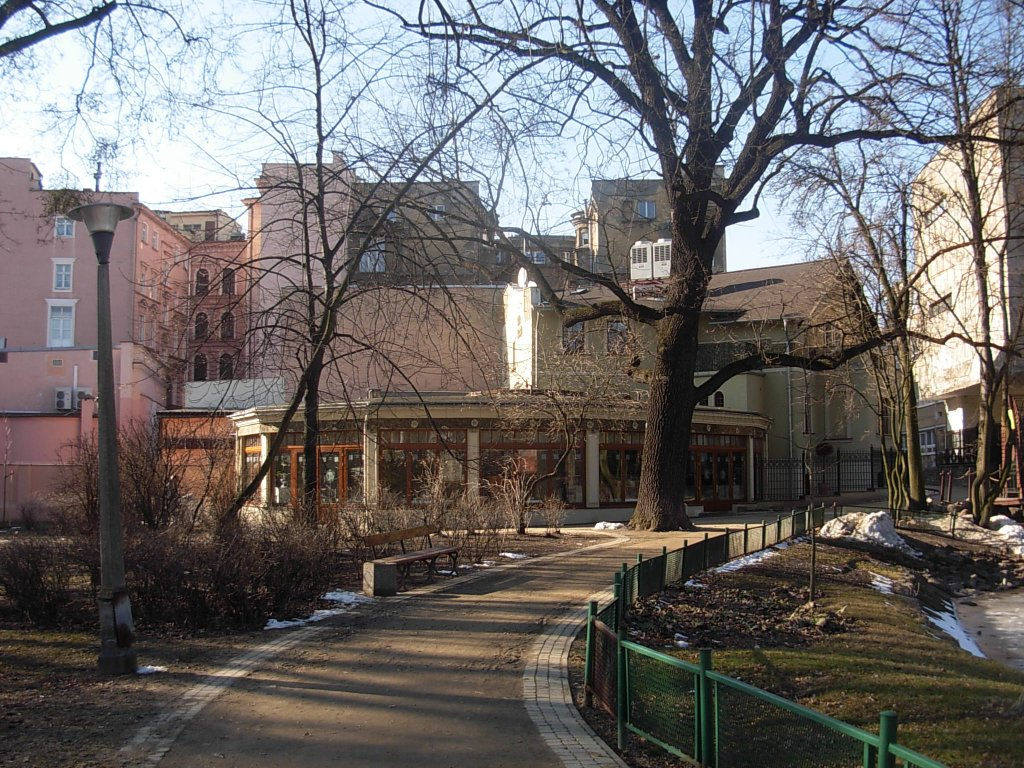
Villa Secesja

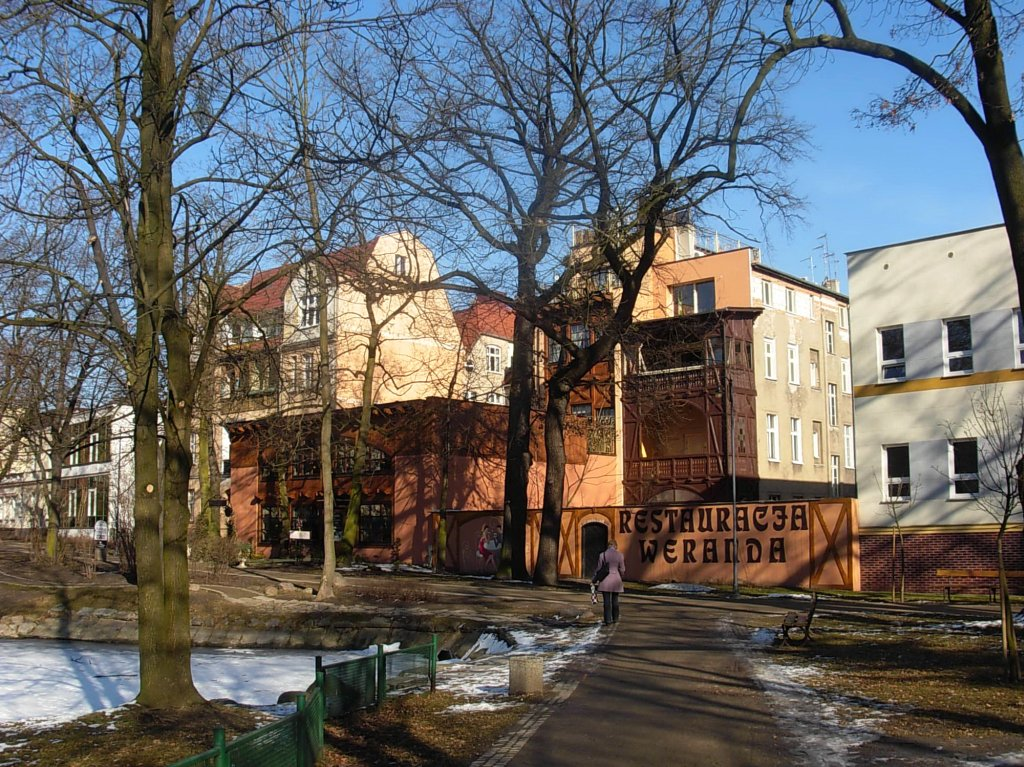
Restaurant "Weranda"

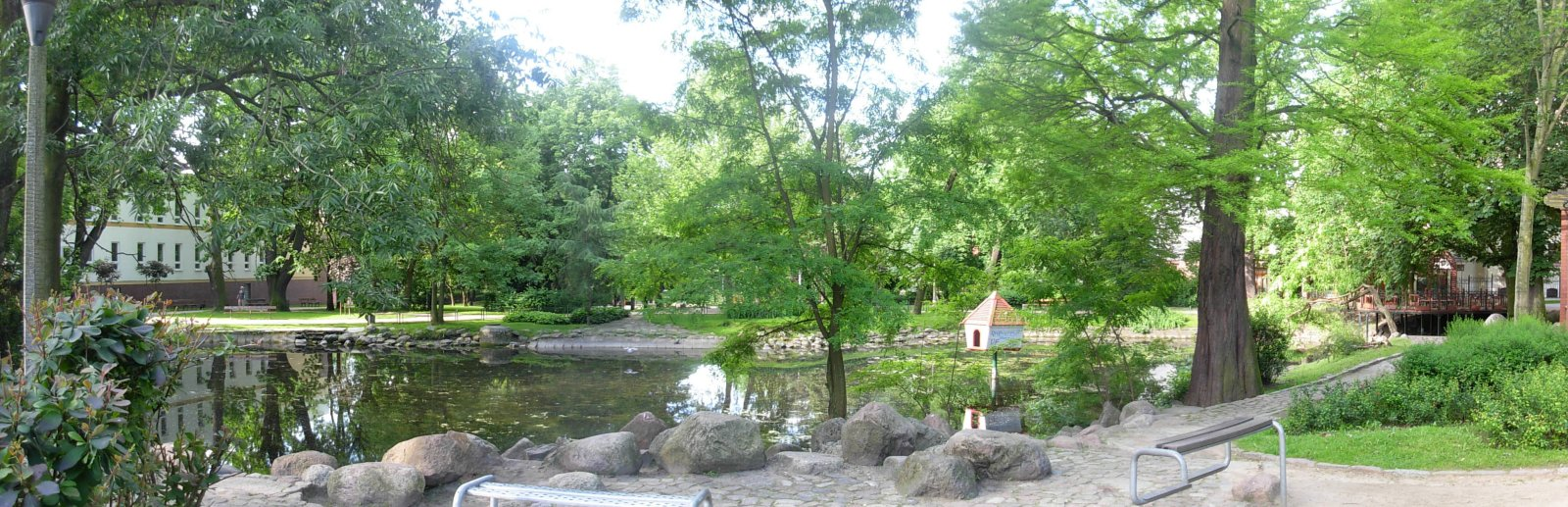
Northern Pond, on the right Taxodium distichum - Polish Natural Monument

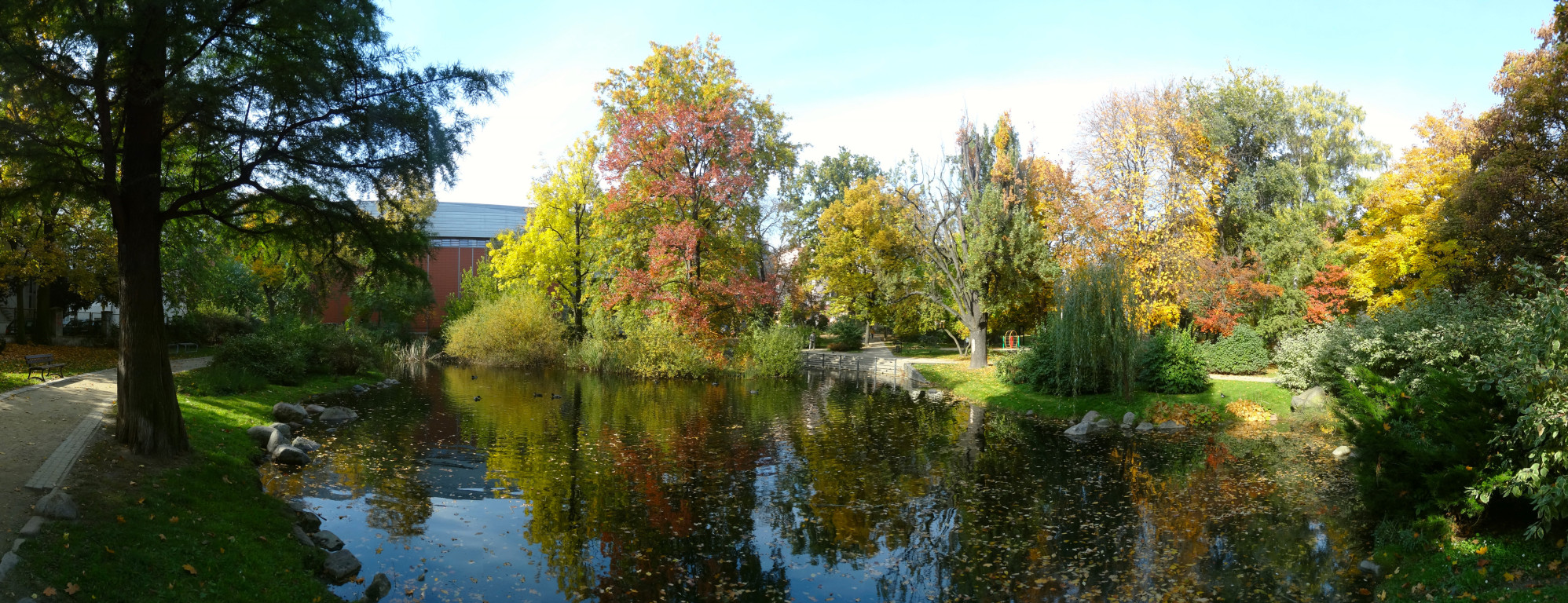
Southern pond in Fall 2013

== See also ==
- Bydgoszcz
- Freedom Square in Bydgoszcz
- Gdańska Street, Bydgoszcz
- St Peter's and St Paul's Church, Bydgoszcz
- Freedom Monument, Bydgoszcz
- Tenement at Freedom Square 1, Bydgoszcz
- (in Polish) Parks and green areas in Bydgoszcz
- (in Polish) Nature conservation in Bydgoszcz

== Bibliography ==
- Pastuszewski, Stefan (1996). Bydgoska Gospodarka Komunalna. Praca zbiorowa (in Polish). Bydgoszcz: Instytut Wydawniczy „Świadectwo”. ISBN 83-85860-37-1.
- Kaja, Renata (1995). Bydgoskie pomniki przyrody (in Polish). Bydgoszcz: Instytut Wydawniczy „Świadectwo”. ISBN 83-85860-32-0.
- Kuczma, Rajmund (1995). Zieleń w dawnej Bydgoszczy (in Polish). Bydgoszcz: Instytut Wydawniczy „Świadectwo”.
- Umiński, Janusz (1996). Bydgoszcz-Przewodnik (in Polish). Bydgoszcz: Wydawnictwo Uczelniane Wyższej Pomorskiej Szkoły Turystyki i Hotelarstwa w Bydgoszczy.
