= Literalism =

Literalism may refer to:

- Literal and figurative language
- Biblical literalism, a term used differently by different authors concerning biblical interpretation
- Qur'anic literalism, see Bi-la kaifa
- The principle of aiming at a literal translation
- Literalism (art), a style of visual art and literature that shows subject in straightforward manner, without hinting at hidden meaning, usually associated with minimalism
  - Literalism (music), a method of composing music
- Strict constructionism (constitutional literalism)

== See also ==
- Literal (disambiguation)
