= Jerzy Duda-Gracz =

Polish painter

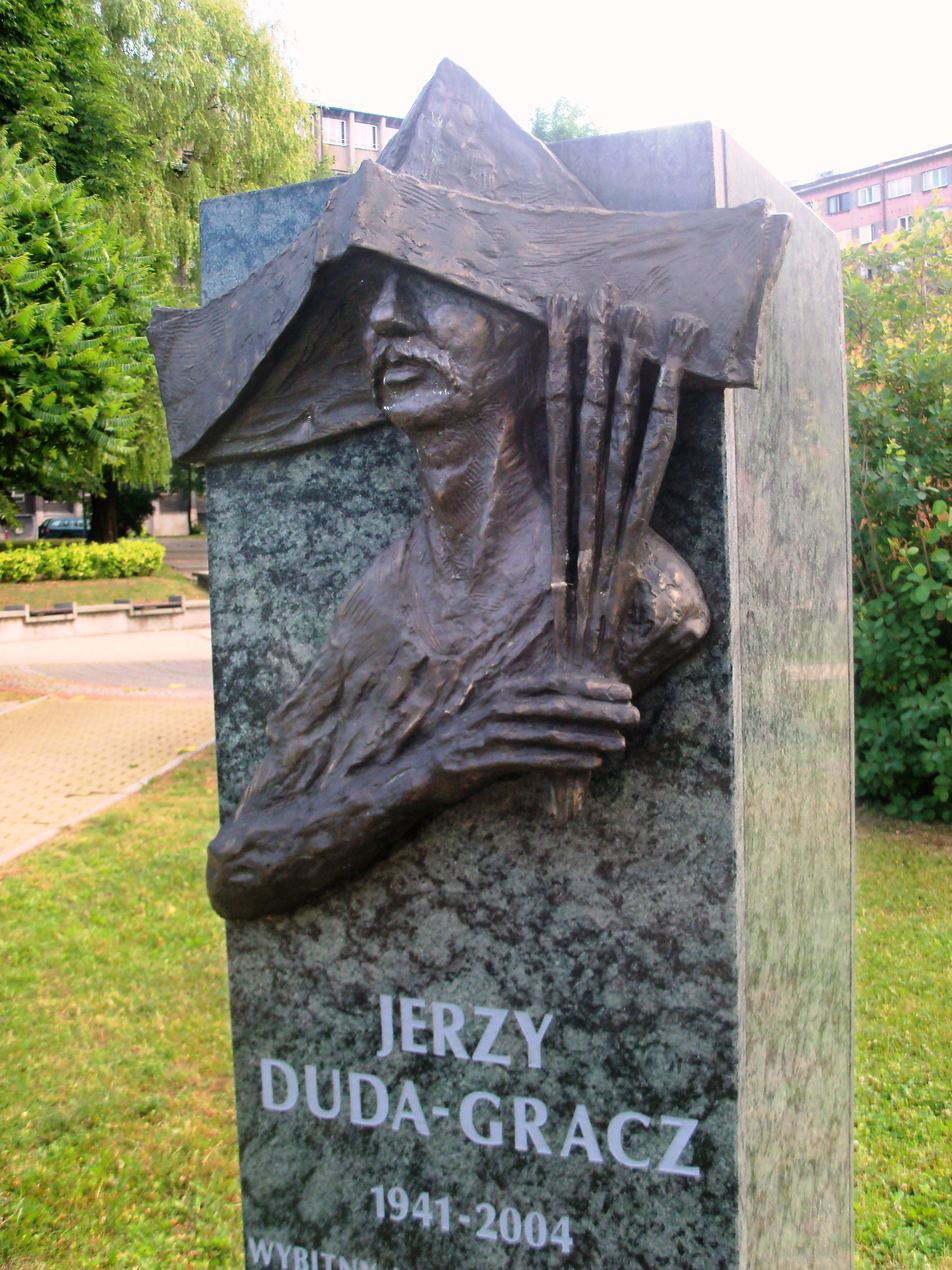

Jerzy Duda-Gracz (March 20, 1941 in Częstochowa – November 5, 2004 in Łagów) was a Polish painter.

He graduated from the Academy of Fine Arts in Kraków in 1968. His work was exhibited in over 187 national and international exhibitions and can be seen at the Polish National Museum in Warsaw, in the museum of the Jagellonian University in Kraków, in the Collegium Maius, the Museum of Earth at the Polish Academy of Sciences in Warsaw, the Uffizi Gallery in Florence, the Pushkin Museum in Moscow, the Municipal Museum in Ghent, the BAWAG Foundation in Vienna, the Vatican Collection and in galleries and collections in many other countries such as the Louvre in France.
