= Moral absolutism =

Metaethical position that some actions are intrinsically right or wrong

Moral absolutism is a metaethical view that some or even all actions are intrinsically right or wrong, regardless of context or consequence.

== Comparison with other ethical theories ==
Moral absolutism is not the same as moral universalism. Universalism holds merely that what is right or wrong is independent of custom or opinion (as opposed to moral relativism), but not necessarily that what is right or wrong is independent of context or consequences (as in absolutism). Louis Pojman gives the following definitions to distinguish the two positions of moral absolutism and objectivism:

- Moral absolutism: There is at least one principle that ought never to be violated.
- Moral objectivism: There is a fact of the matter as to whether any given action is morally permissible or impermissible: a fact of the matter that does not depend solely on social custom or individual acceptance.

Ethical theories which place strong emphasis on rights and duty, such as the deontological ethics of Immanuel Kant, are often considered forms of moral absolutism, as are many religious moral codes.

== Religion ==
One can adhere to moral absolutism in a strictly secular context, exemplified by the many variations of deontological moral rationalism. However, many religions, especially ones which define divine commandments, also adhere to moral absolutist positions. Therefore, to followers of such religions, the moral system is absolute, perfect and unchanging. Some secular philosophies also take a morally absolutist position, asserting that the absolute laws of morality are inherent in the nature of people, the nature of life in general, or the Universe itself.

Thomas Aquinas never explicitly addresses the Euthyphro dilemma, but draws a distinction between what is good or evil in itself and what is good or evil because of God's commands, with unchangeable moral standards forming the bulk of natural law. Thus he contends that not even God can change the Ten Commandments, adding, however, that God can change what individuals deserve in particular cases, in what might look like special dispensations to murder or steal.

== In popular culture ==
- Rorschach, one of the protagonists in the classic comic/graphic novel Watchmen (by Alan Moore and Dave Gibbons): a masked vigilante and ruthless crime-fighter, Rorschach believes in moral absolutism—good and evil as pure ends, with no shades of gray—which compels him to seek to punish any evidence of evil at all costs. His mask displays a constantly morphing inkblot based on the ambiguous designs used in Rorschach inkblot tests, also his namesake, with the mask's black and white coloring never touching each other, and therefore consistent with his sense and view of morality.

== See also ==
- Authoritarianism
- Deontological ethics
- Divine command theory
- Formalism (philosophy)
- Fundamentalism
- Good versus evil
- Graded absolutism
- Legalism (theology)
- Literalism (disambiguation)
- Moral dilemma
- Natural law
- Paternalism
- Religious exclusivism
- Ritualism
