= Kiejstut Bereźnicki =

Polish painter and professor (born 1935)

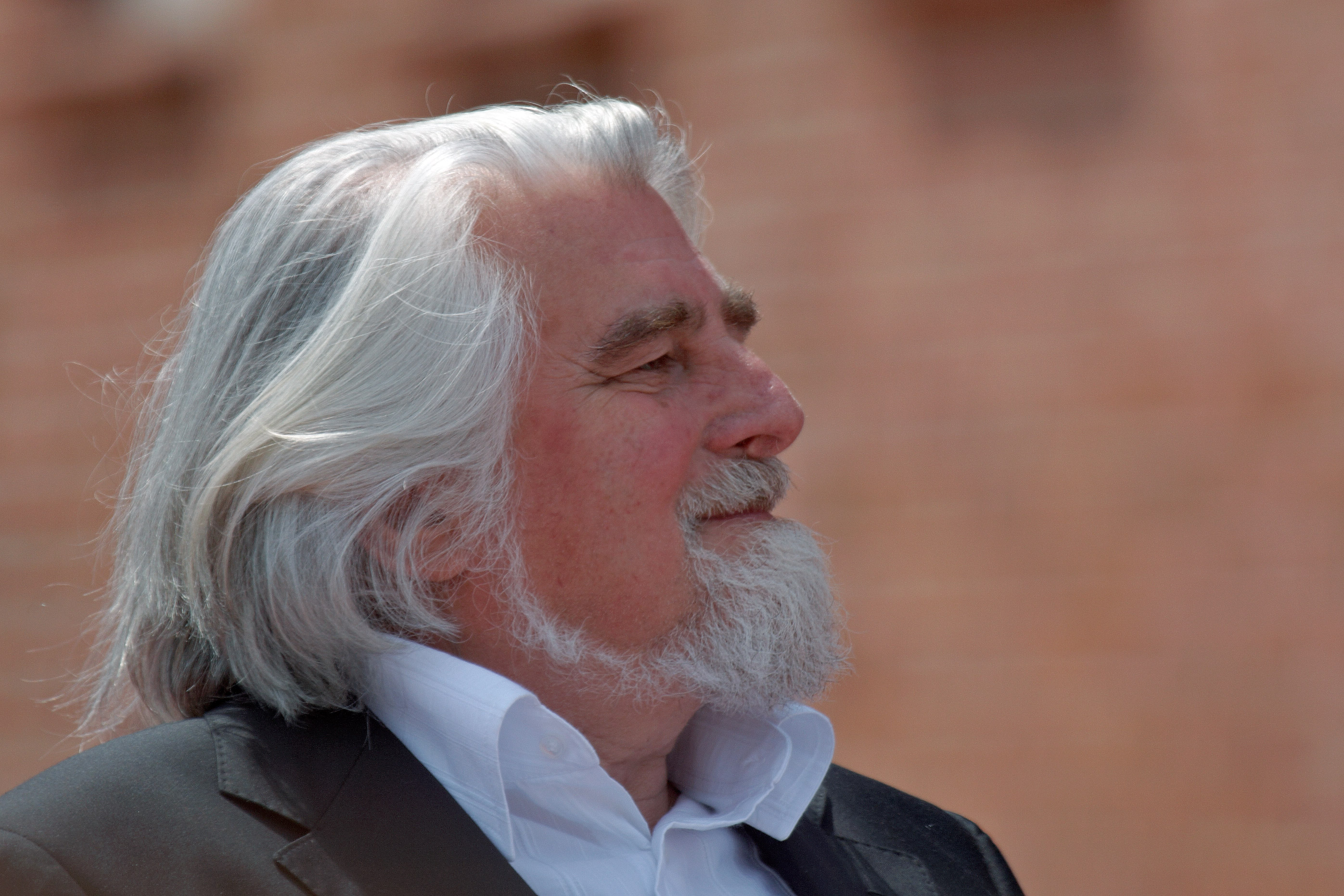
Kiejstut Bereźnicki

Kiejstut Bereźnicki (born 21 December 1935 in Poznań) is a Polish painter, draftsman, and professor at the Academy of Fine Arts in Gdańsk.
