= Littoral (disambiguation) =

Littoral zone is an area near the coastline of a body of water.

Littoral or Litoral may also refer to:

== Geography ==
=== Current entities ===
- Littoral (Benin), a department of Benin
- Litoral (Bolivia), a province of Oruro Department, Bolivia
- Litoral (Equatorial Guinea), a province of Equatorial Guinea
- Littoral Region (Cameroon), a region of Cameroon
- A region of the mouth of the St. Lawrence River; see Bas-Saint-Laurent

=== Historical entities and informal regions ===
- Austrian Littoral (Küstenland), a crown land of Austria-Hungary
- Littoral Banovina, a province of the former Kingdom of Yugoslavia
- Croatian Littoral
- Pontic littoral, the littoral zone of the Black Sea
- Mediterranean littoral
- Argentine Littoral, another name for Mesopotamia, Argentina
- Slovene Littoral, an informal province of Slovenia
- Litoral Department, a former territory of Bolivia
- Montenegrin Littoral

== Other ==
- Littoral (military), a type of military operation
- Littoral combat ship, a class of warship presently being considered by the US Navy
- Littoral rights, legal term for access and use rights to ocean shoreline
- Littoral state, a state that has access to a particular maritime area
- Club Deportivo Litoral (Cochabamba), a Bolivian football club
- Club Deportivo Litoral (La Paz), a Bolivian football club
