= Father Stanisław Konarski Street, Bydgoszcz =

Street in Bydgoszcz, Poland

Coordinates: 53°07′25″N 18°00′23″E

Father Stanisław Konarski Street
Bydgoszcz
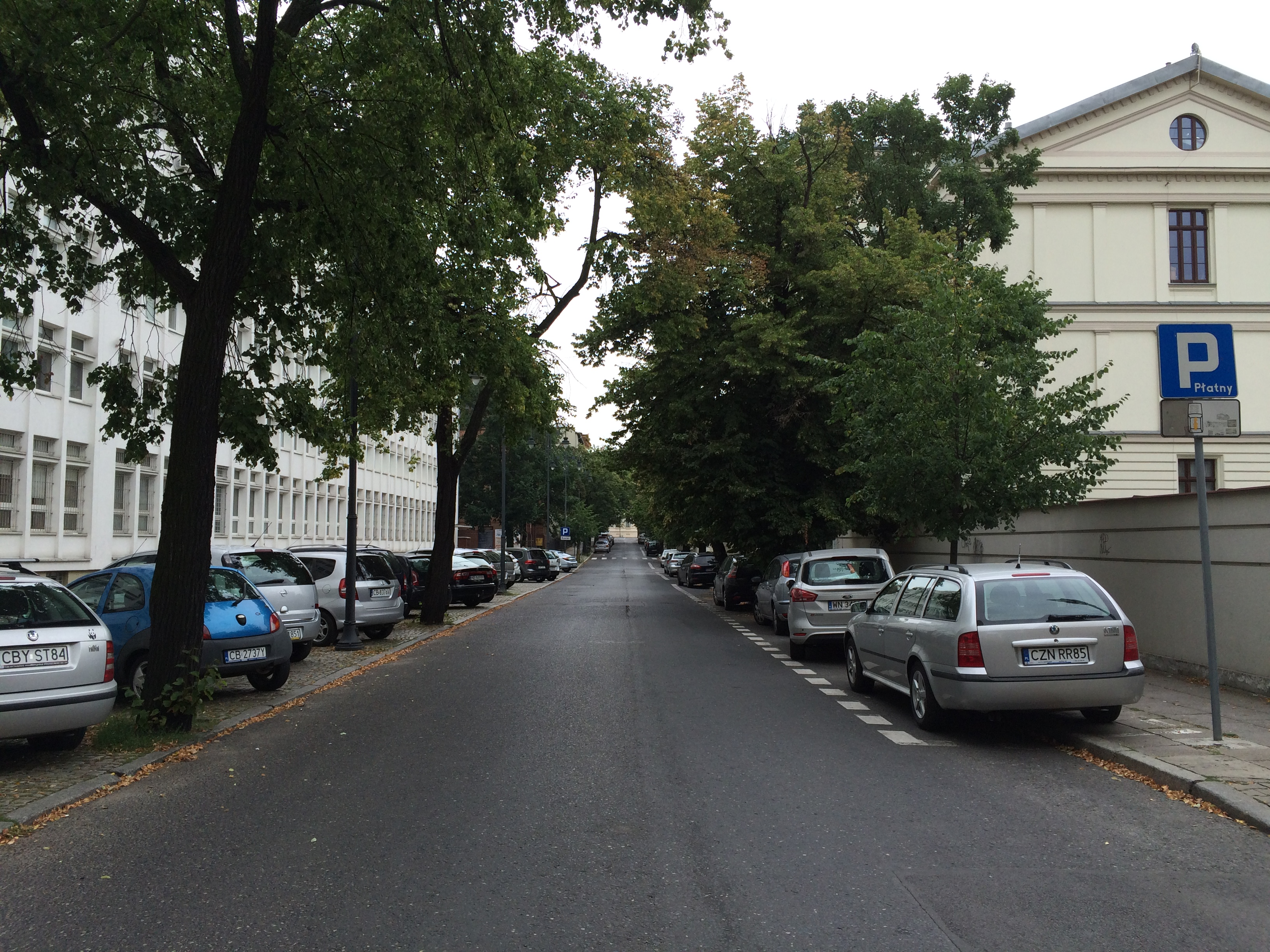
- Northward view of Stanisław Konarski street

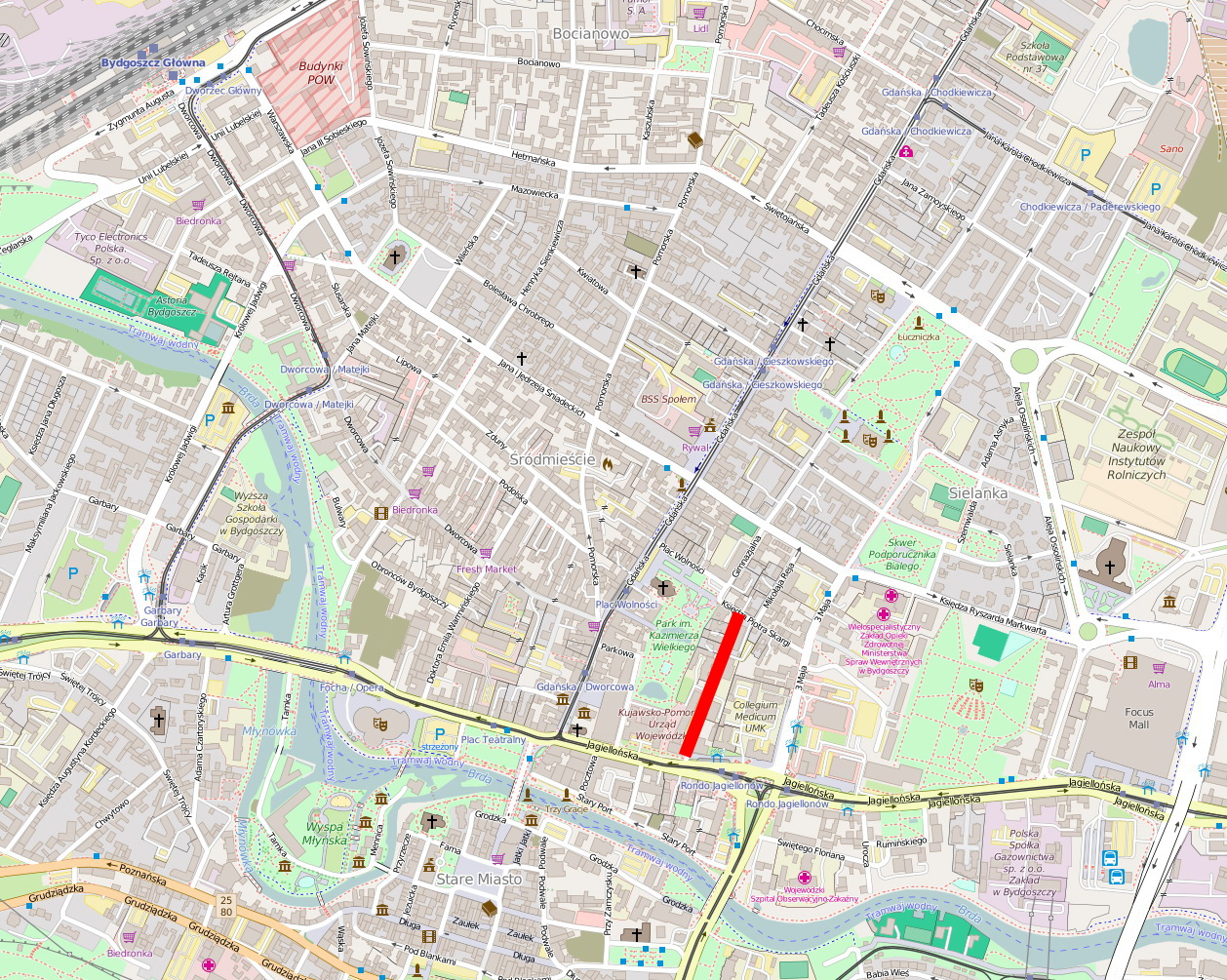
- Location of Stanisław Konarski street
- Native name: Ulica Księdza Stanisława Konarskiego (Polish)
- Former name: Schule straße
- Namesake: Stanisław Konarski
- Owner: City of Bydgoszcz
- Length: 290 m (950 ft); Google maps
- Area: Downtown district
- Location: Bydgoszcz, Poland

Construction
- Construction start: End of the 1870s
- Completed: 1880

Stanisław Konarski street is a historical street of downtown Bydgoszcz.

== Location ==
Father Stanisław Konarski Street follows a roughly north–south axis, from Piotra Skargi Street to Jagiellońska street. It runs parallel to the eastern edge of Casimir the Great Park.

== History ==
While the main downtown (Polish: Śródmieście) thoroughfare of Bydgoszcz, Gdańska Street, had a brisk expansion after the 1830s, collateral areas (Piotra Skargi Street, Kołłątaja street, Gimnazjalna, Libelta or Szwalbego Streets) developed at a more slower pace.

First reference of Father Stanisław Konarski Street in city address book of Bromberg dates back to the mid-1870s.

First map to mention the street bears the year 1876.

Through history, the street bore the following names:

- 1870s-1920, Schule straße (School street);
- 1920–1940, Father Stanisław Konarski street;
- 1940–1945, Schule straße;
- Since 1945, Father Stanisław Konarski street.

Actual namesake comes from Stanisław Konarski (1700–1773), a Polish pedagogue, educational reformer, political writer, poet, dramatist, Piarist priest and precursor of the Enlightenment in the Polish–Lithuanian Commonwealth.

== Main edifices ==
=== Regional Office Buildings, at 1-/, corner with 7 Jagiellońska street ===
1962-1965 (building on Konarski street), by architect Jerzy Jerka, 1966-1969 (tower building), by architect Bronislaw Jablonki

Modern architecture

Both buildings, (14-storey tower and the long one on Konarski Street) are additions to the 19th century original edifice, where now seats the Kuyavian-Pomeranian Voivodeship administration and leadership. They are connected to the historical house via a pedestrian covered bridge, crossing over an entry to the Casimir the Great Park.

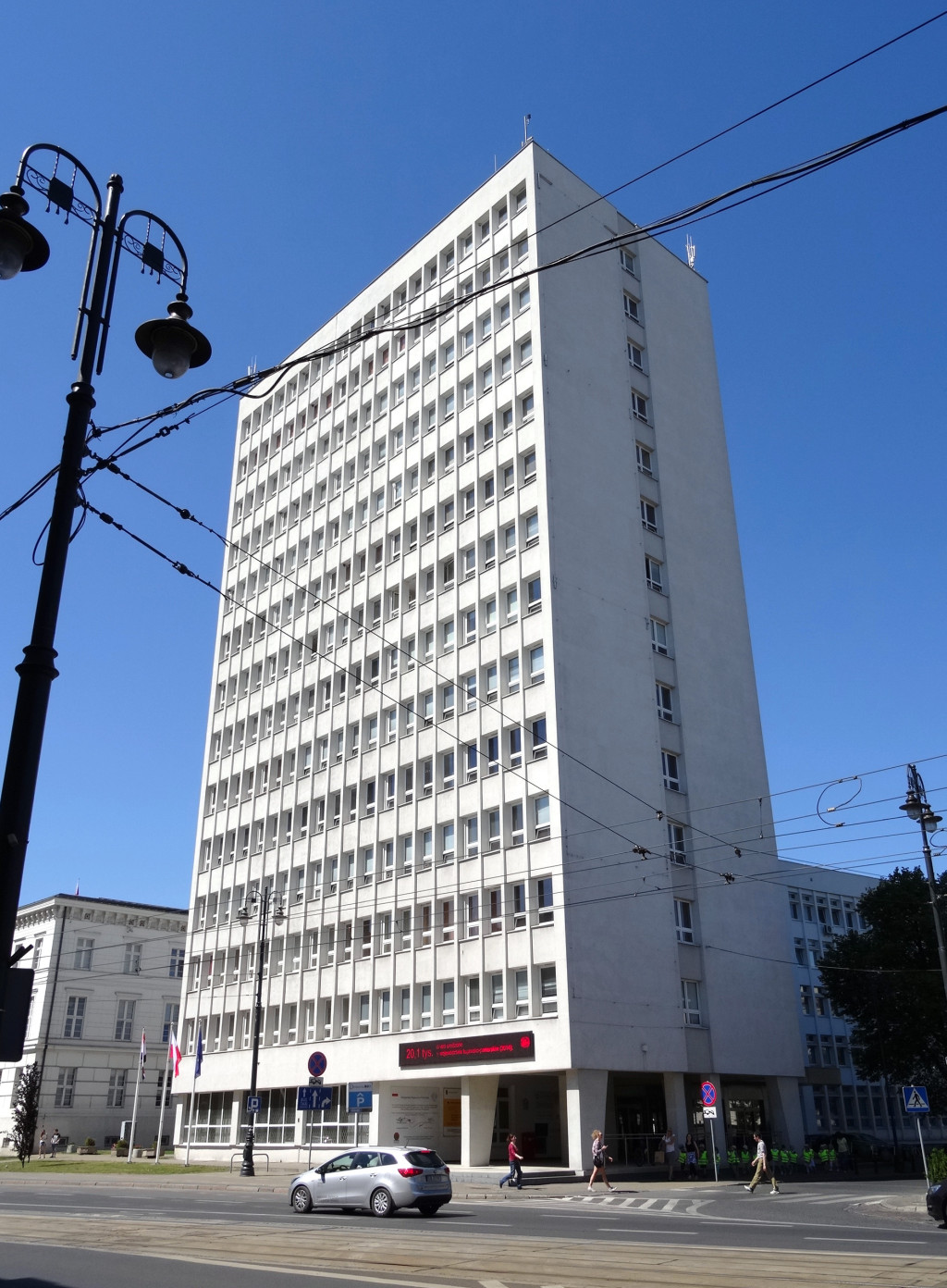
View from Jagiellońska street

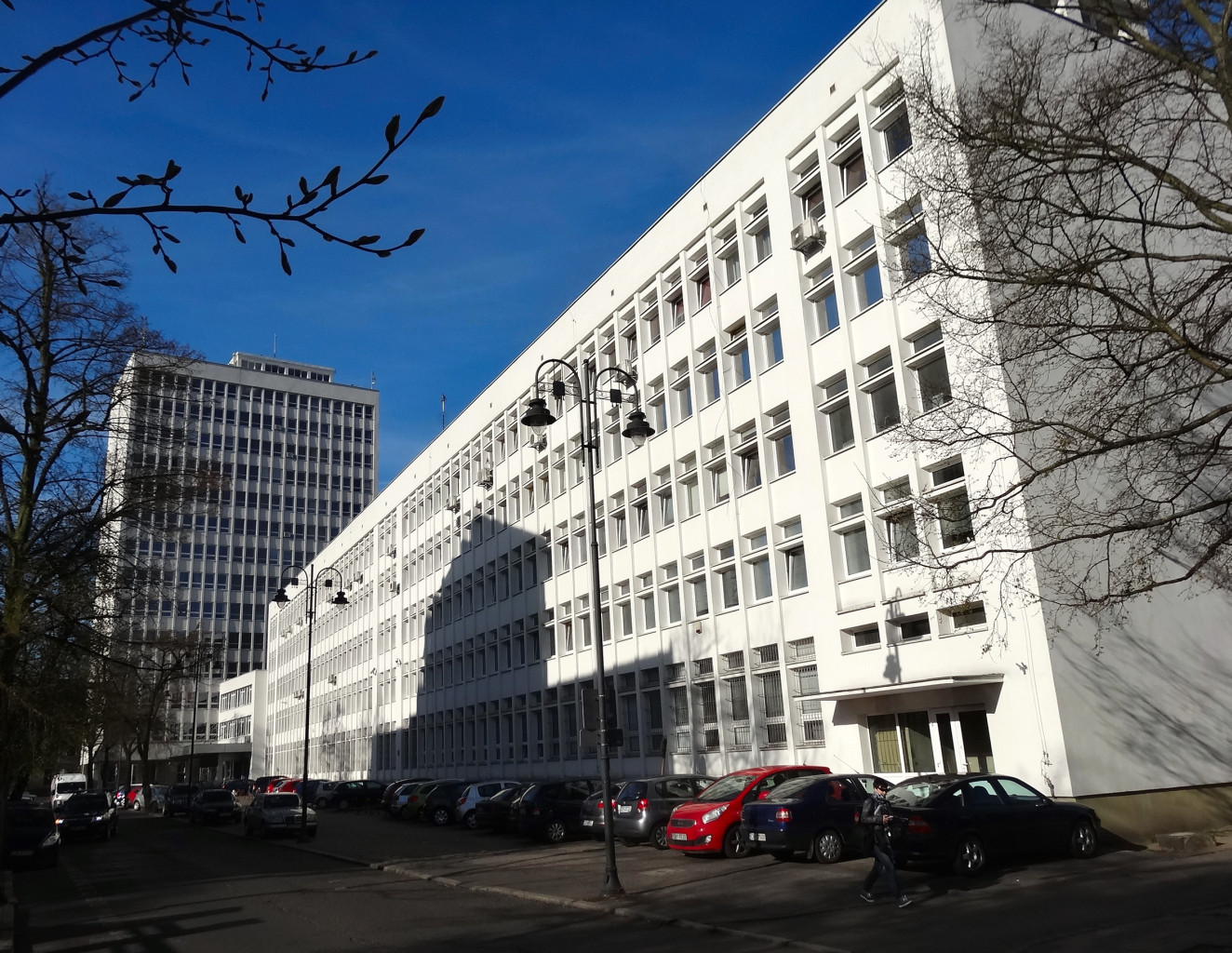
View from Konarski Street

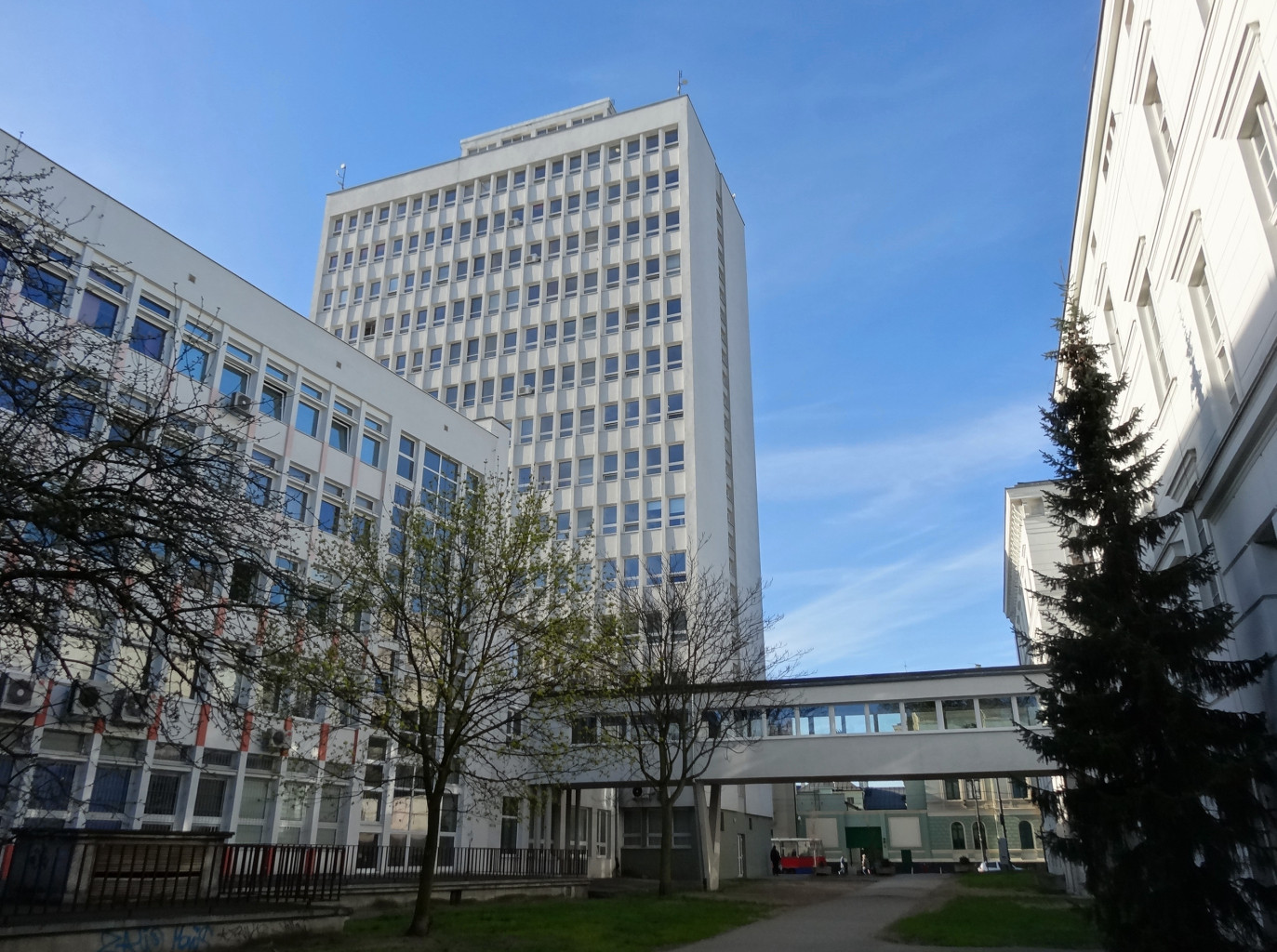
The tower at Nr.1, an extension at Nr.3 (left), the pedestrian bridge, and the historical building (right)

=== Tenement at 8 Jagiellońska street, corner with Konarskiego Street ===
1877, 1901

Neoclassical architecture

The building was erected in 1872 on a design by architect Müller, so as to house the civic school for boys (German: Bürgerschule). The school was initially located in the former Bydgoszcz's Carmelites monastery. It was an elite folk school, with a 9 years cycle, and pupils usually belonged to wealthy high society, rich enough to pay the high tuition fees. In the mid-1880s, the Bürgerschule moved further up in Konarskiego street, where is located today the Bydgoszcz School of Fine Arts (Nr.2), or, according to the Prussian street numeration, from Nr.8 to Nr.7. The edifice has been rebuilt in 1901 In the 1990s, the edifice housed the Foreign Language Teacher Training College, which then moved to Dworcowa Street. Since 2010, the seat of the Kujawsko-Pomorskie Centre for Education and Kuyavian-Pomeranian Voivodeship Marshal's Office in Bydgoszcz are located here.

On the sidewalk grows a ginkgo identified as Natural landmark of Bydgoszcz.

The building boasts historicism features, with a predominant Neoclassical architecture form. It has a "L" shape, with a prominent avant-corps in the middle of its frontage, with two storey, an attic and a basement. The entrance double portal is topped with a triangular pediment and a tympanum in which is placed a circular ornament. The facade is divided by horizontal cornices and a wide frieze on its top. The ground floor is decorated with bossage.

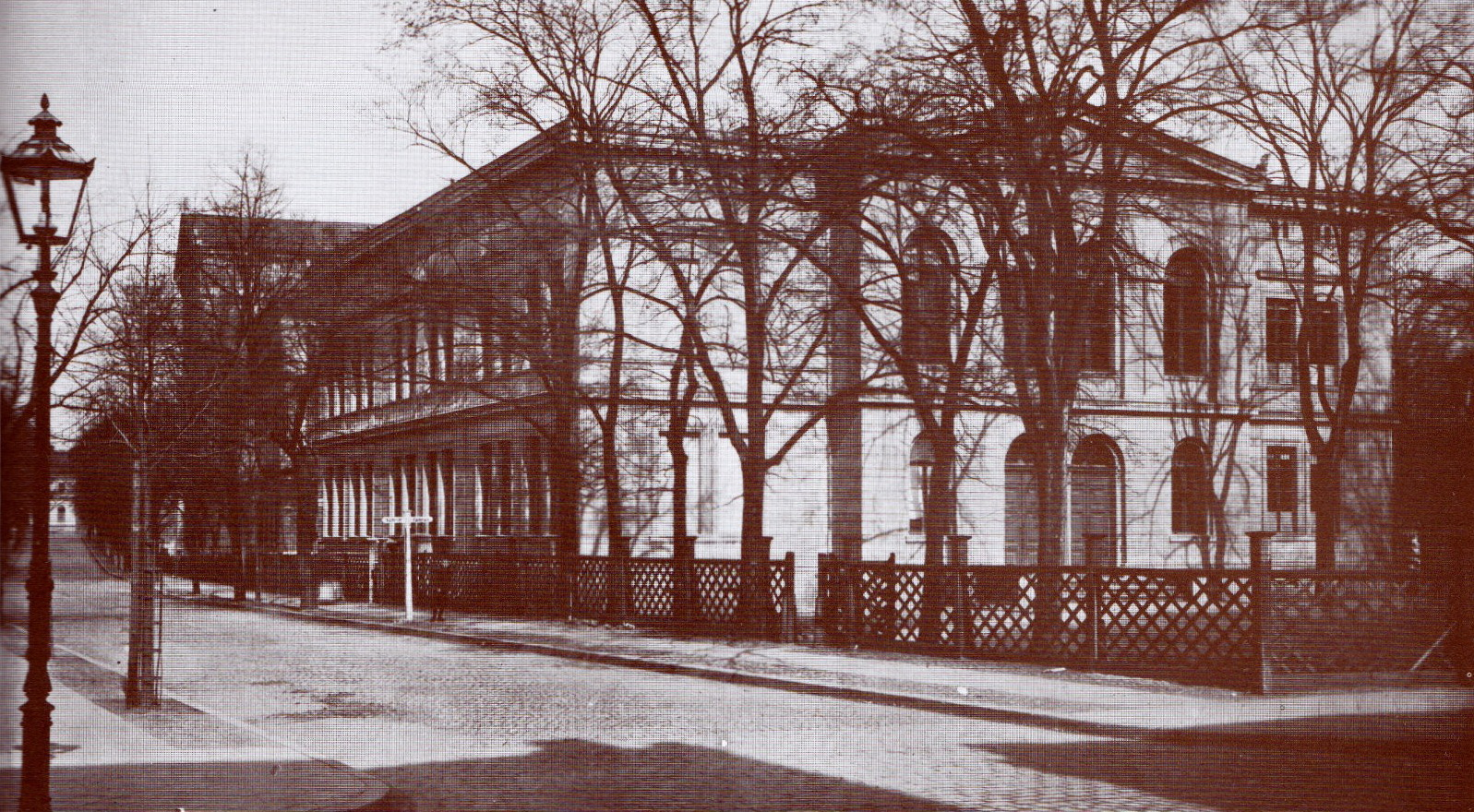
The building ca. 1915

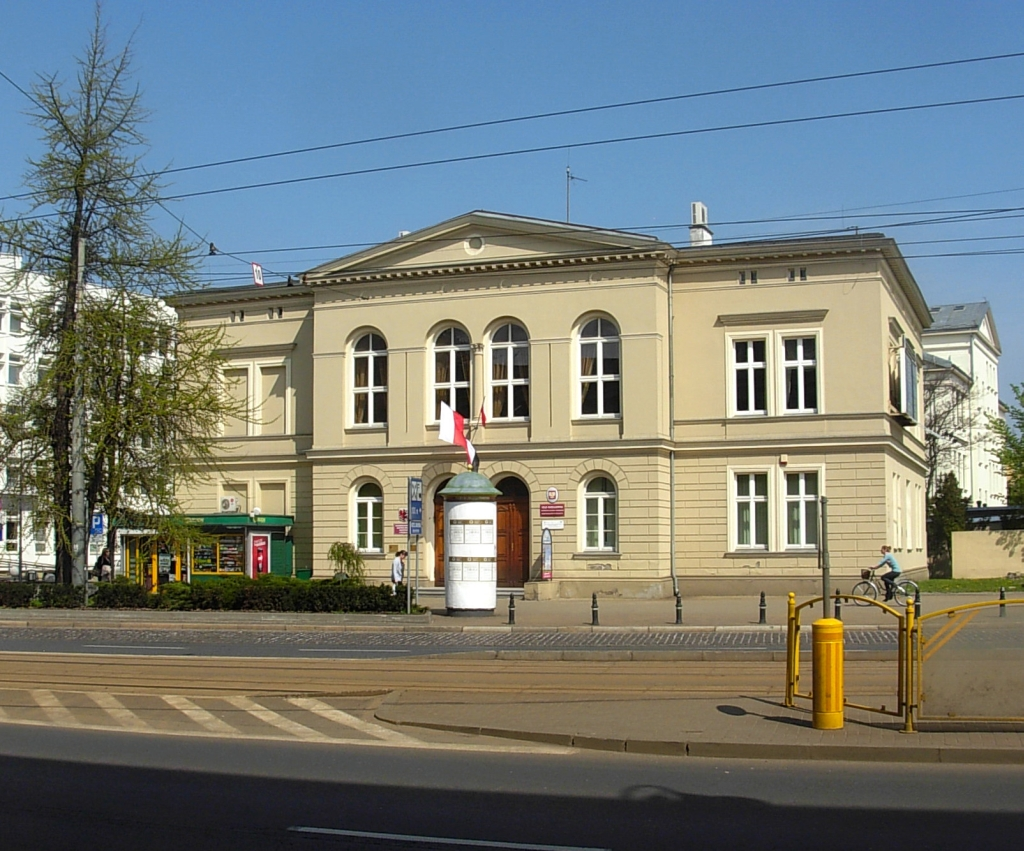
Today, view from Jagiellońska street

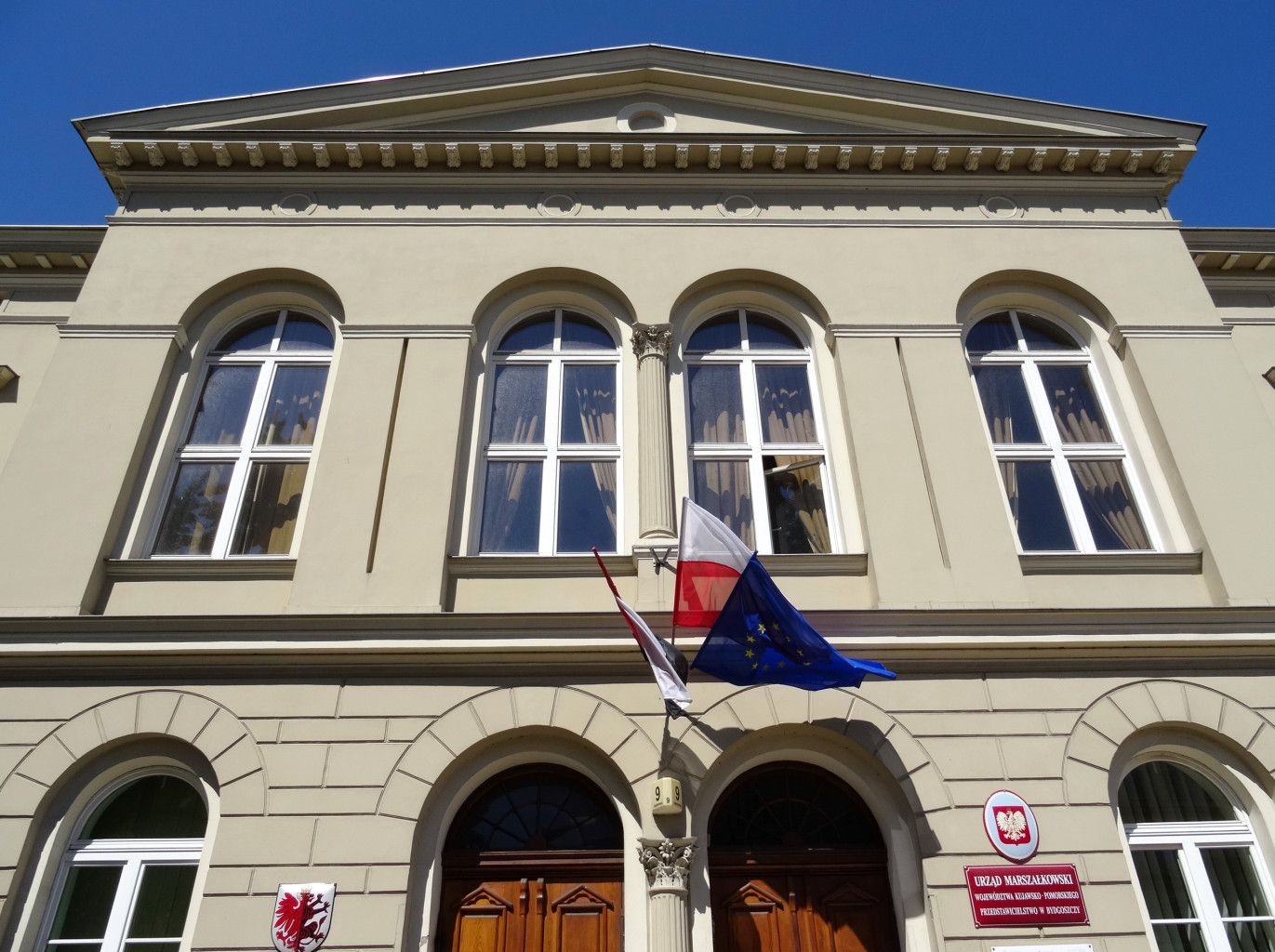
The avant-corps and its pediment

=== Bydgoszcz School of Fine Arts, at 2 ===
Kuyavian-Pomeranian Heritage list Nr.A/743 & 158/A, 11 April.

1875–1878, by Heinrich Gruder & Carl Rose

Neoclassical architecture

The school building has been designed by engineer Heinrich Gruder who worked on the construction of nearby St Peter's and St Paul's Church, and executed by city architect Carl Rose, who realized several other edifices in Bydgoszcz, particularly in Gdańska Street. Once completed in 1878, the building housed the Town School for girls (German: Städtische Töchterschule), having its address at SchulStraße 7. In 1885, the School for girls swapped its location with the one for boys (Bürgerschule), between old Nr.7 and 8: girls moved to nowadays house at the corner with Jagiellońska street, boys to the present building at Konarskiego Nr.2. The school for boys operated there till 1911, when it moved again to today's Staszica street. From 1920 to 1935, the edifice housed the Faculty for boys, Polish: Męska Szkoła Wydziałowa dla Chłopców. Having accommodated a military hospital at the end of World War II, the building resumed its initial role in 1982, when the Bydgoszcz School of Fine Arts (established 1945 by Marian Turwid) moved from Pomeranian Arts House to the precincts. The edifice has undergone its last renovation in 2011, with a co-funding between European Regional Development and Polish State.

The building was built in the style of eclectic with a predominance of Neo-Renaissance elements. It has two-storey, with a high basement. The facade, in its central part displays a large avant-corps, topped by a pediment. The first floor is adorned with pilasters flanking lancet windows, the ground floor has a bossage decoration: on the elevation, floral friezes are visible. Both building wings are covered with gable roofs. Inside, one can notice the main staircase, adorned with a wrought-iron balustrade with floral motifs. The main hall is ornamented with Tuscan pilasters and ionic order columns. On the second floor, the auditorium is garnished with a magnificent contemporary stucco work.

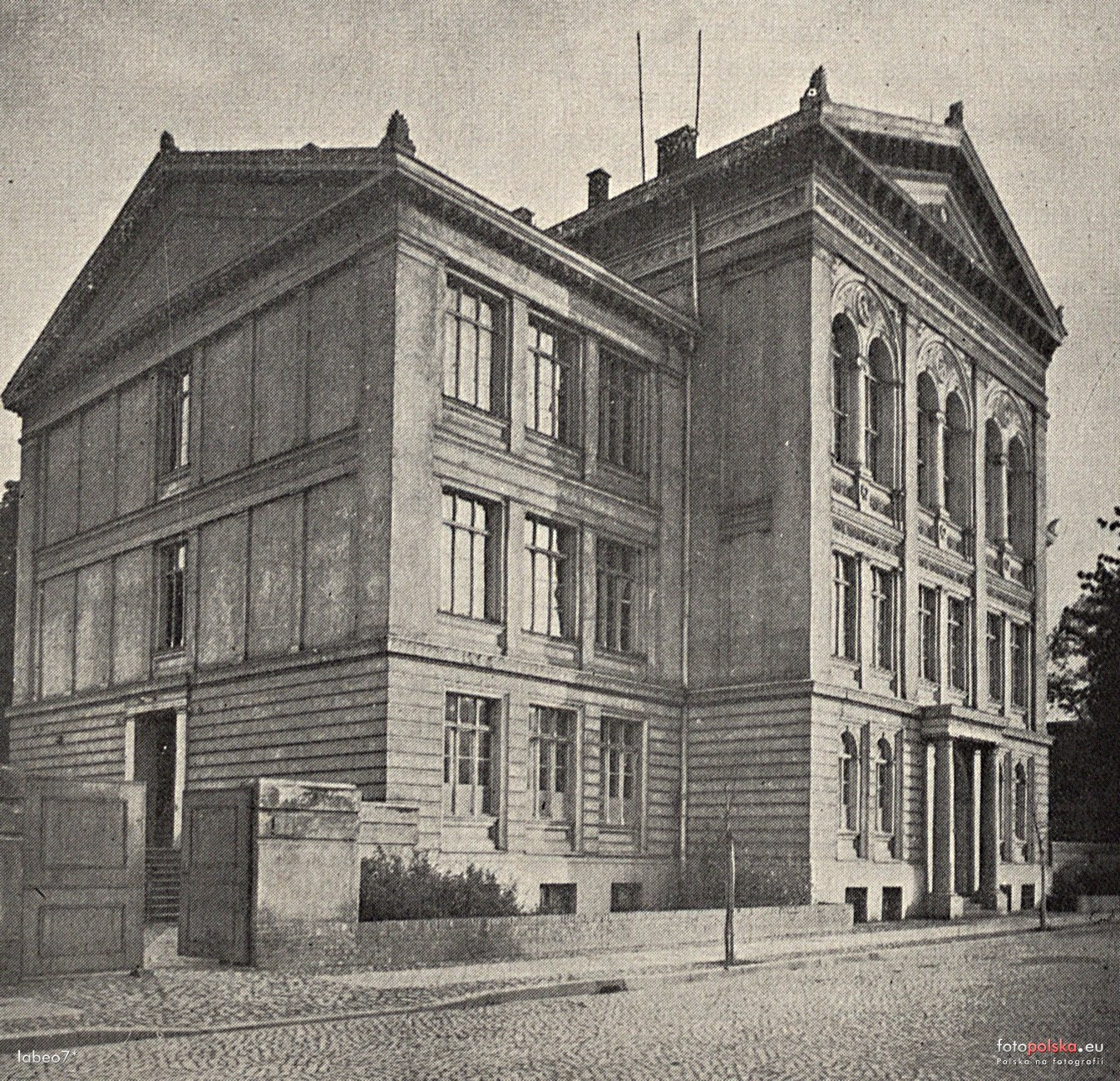
Building ca 1937

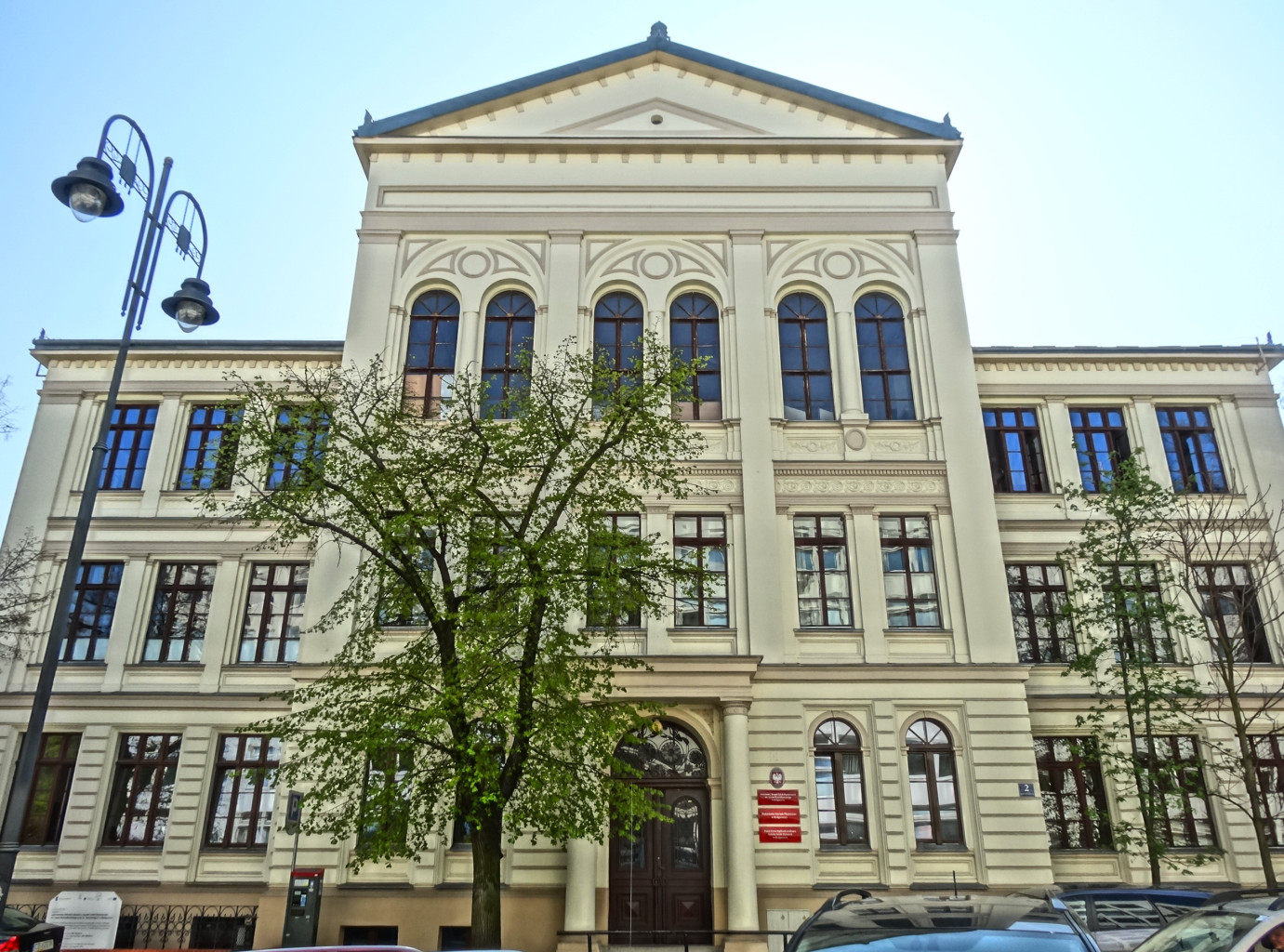
General view of the elevation

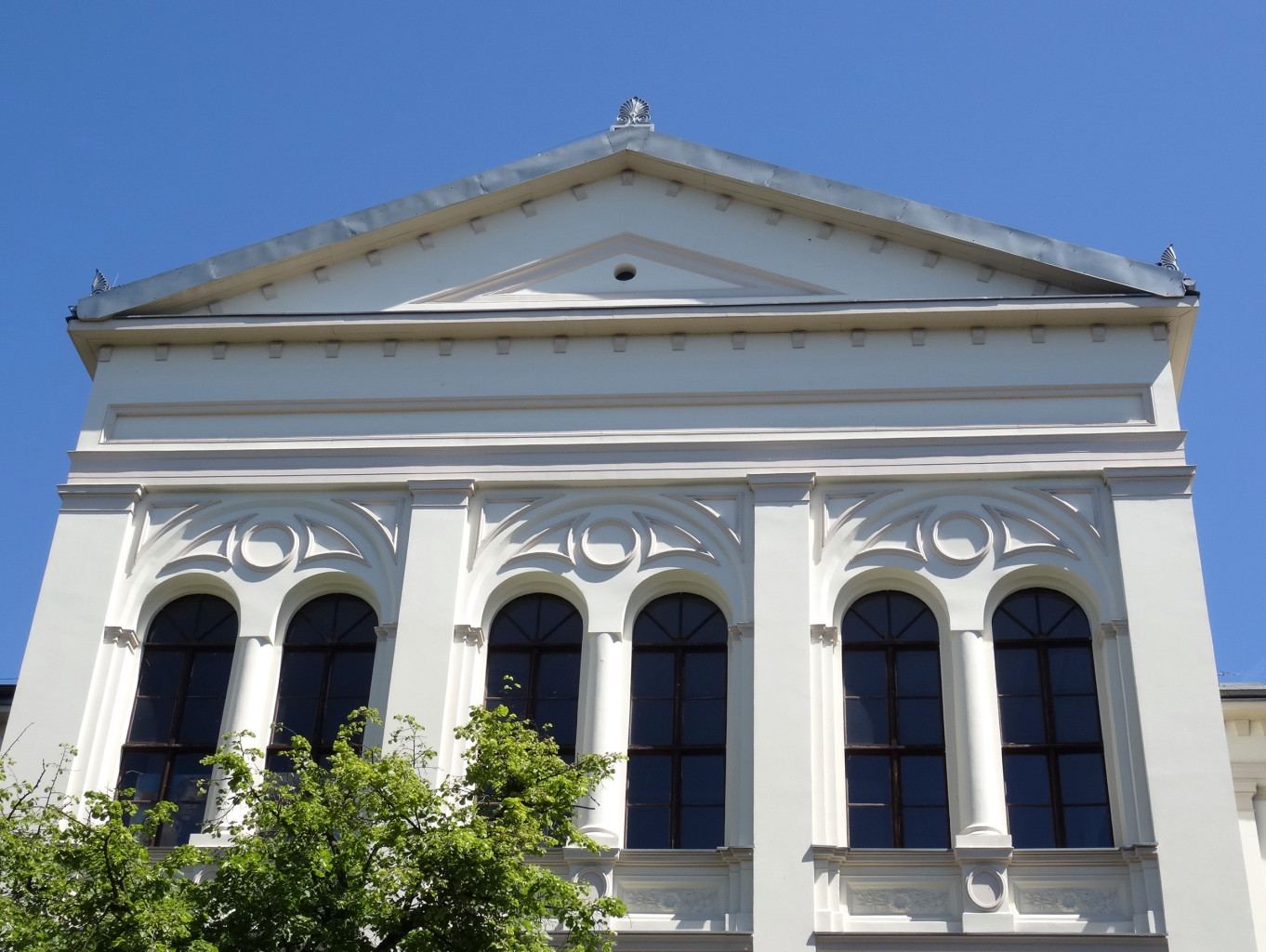
Detail of the avant-corps

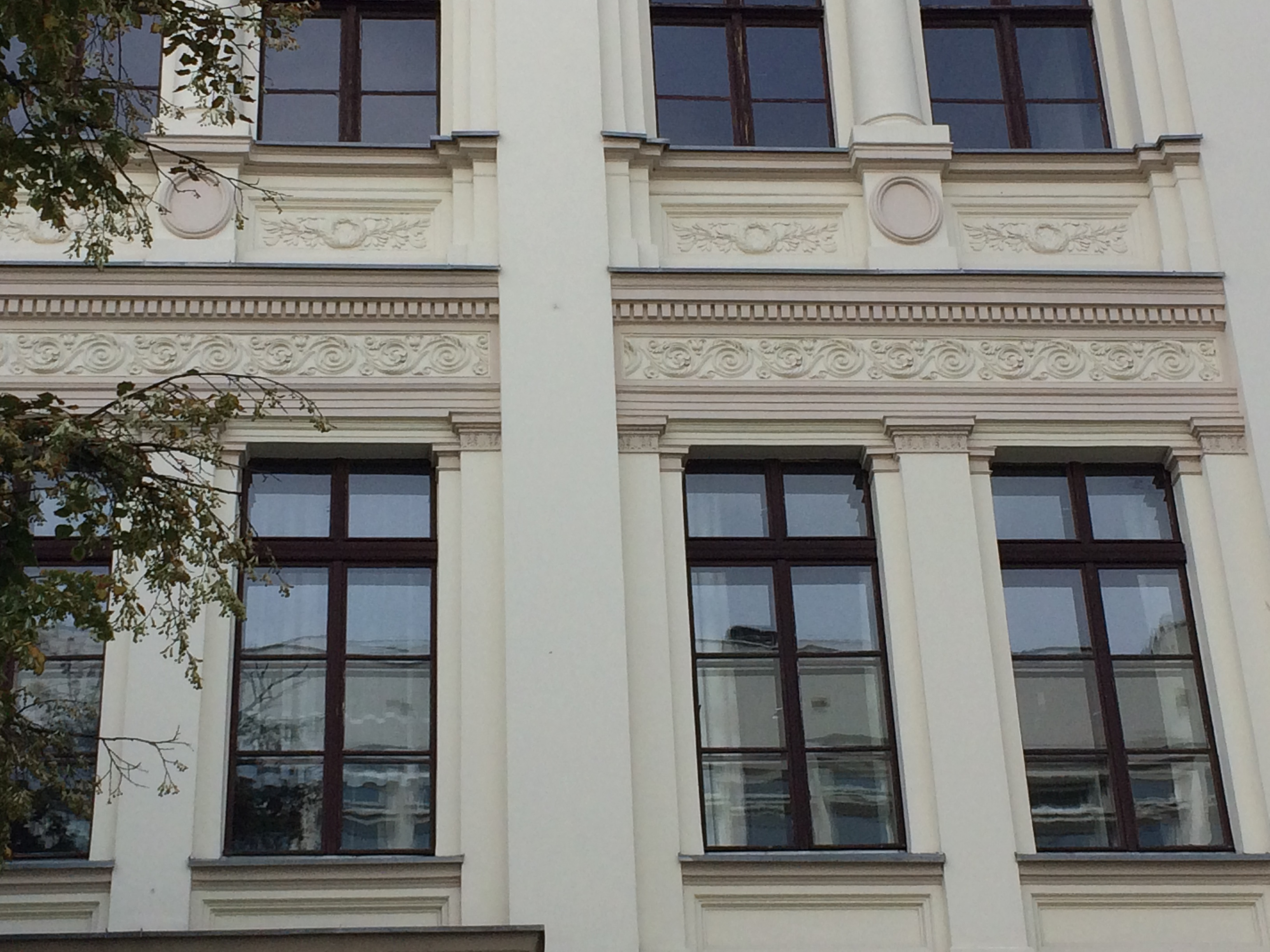
Friezes and pilasters

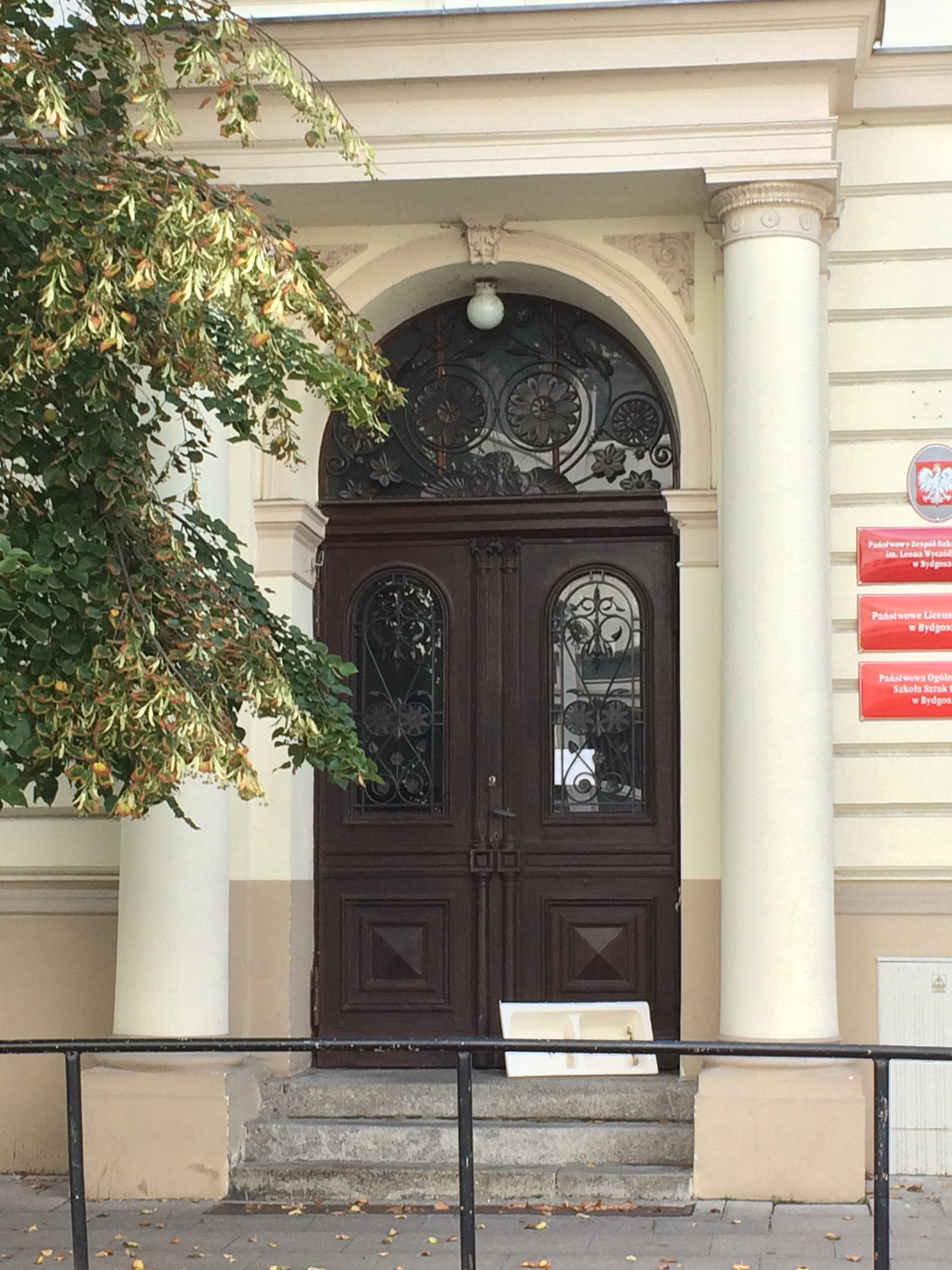
Main gate

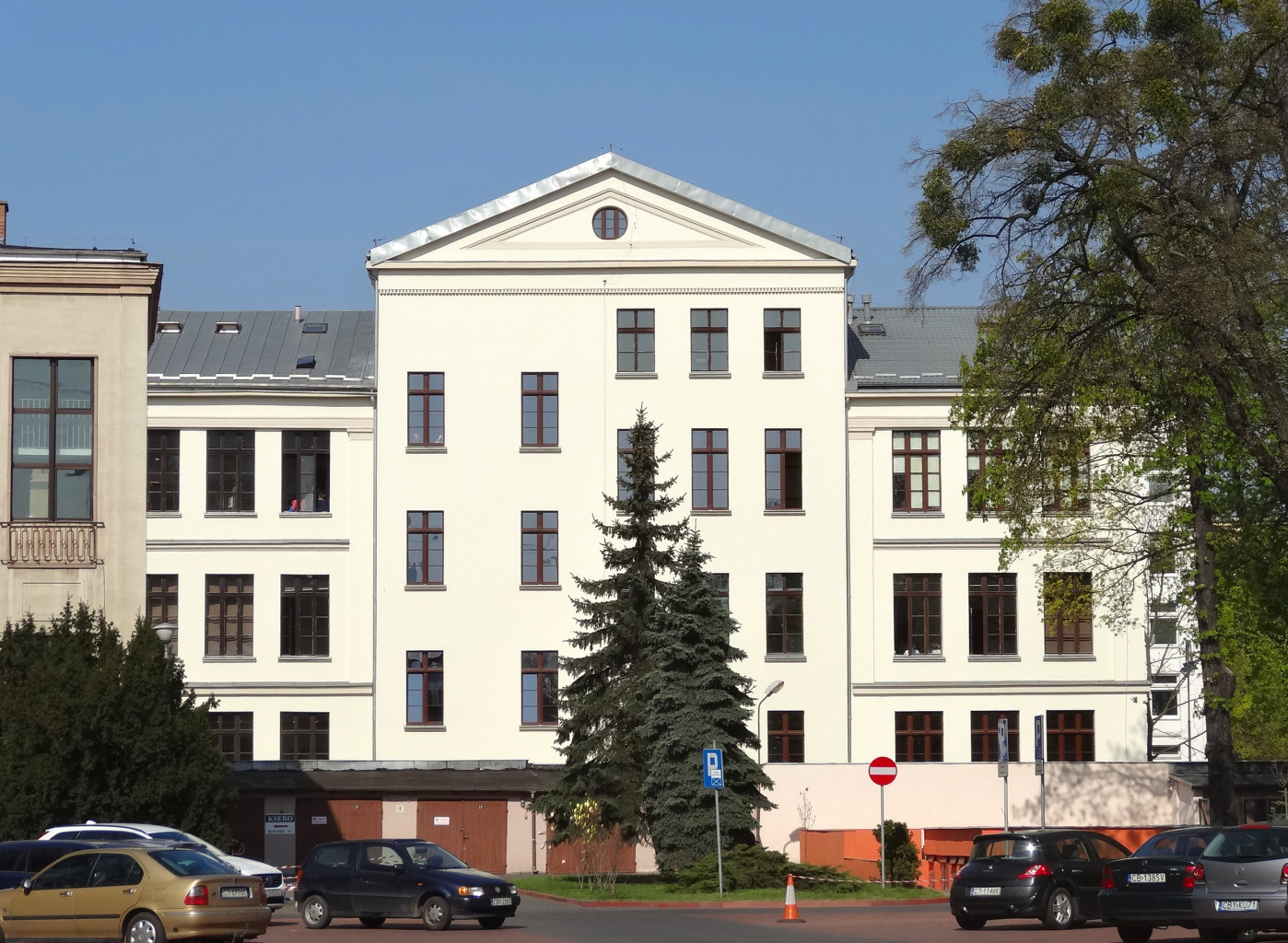
Backyard view

=== Gymnasium at 4 ===
ca 1878

Eclecticism

Since its inception, the building has been used as a sports hall (German: Turnhalle) for the different schools in the street. It is still used today as such by the Catering School of Bydgoszcz.

Despite being a simple gym hall, the building, nonetheless, exposes nice architectural details such as large round top windows on street facade flanked by pilasters, a portal framing the main entry and carved wooden beams adorning the bottom of the gable.

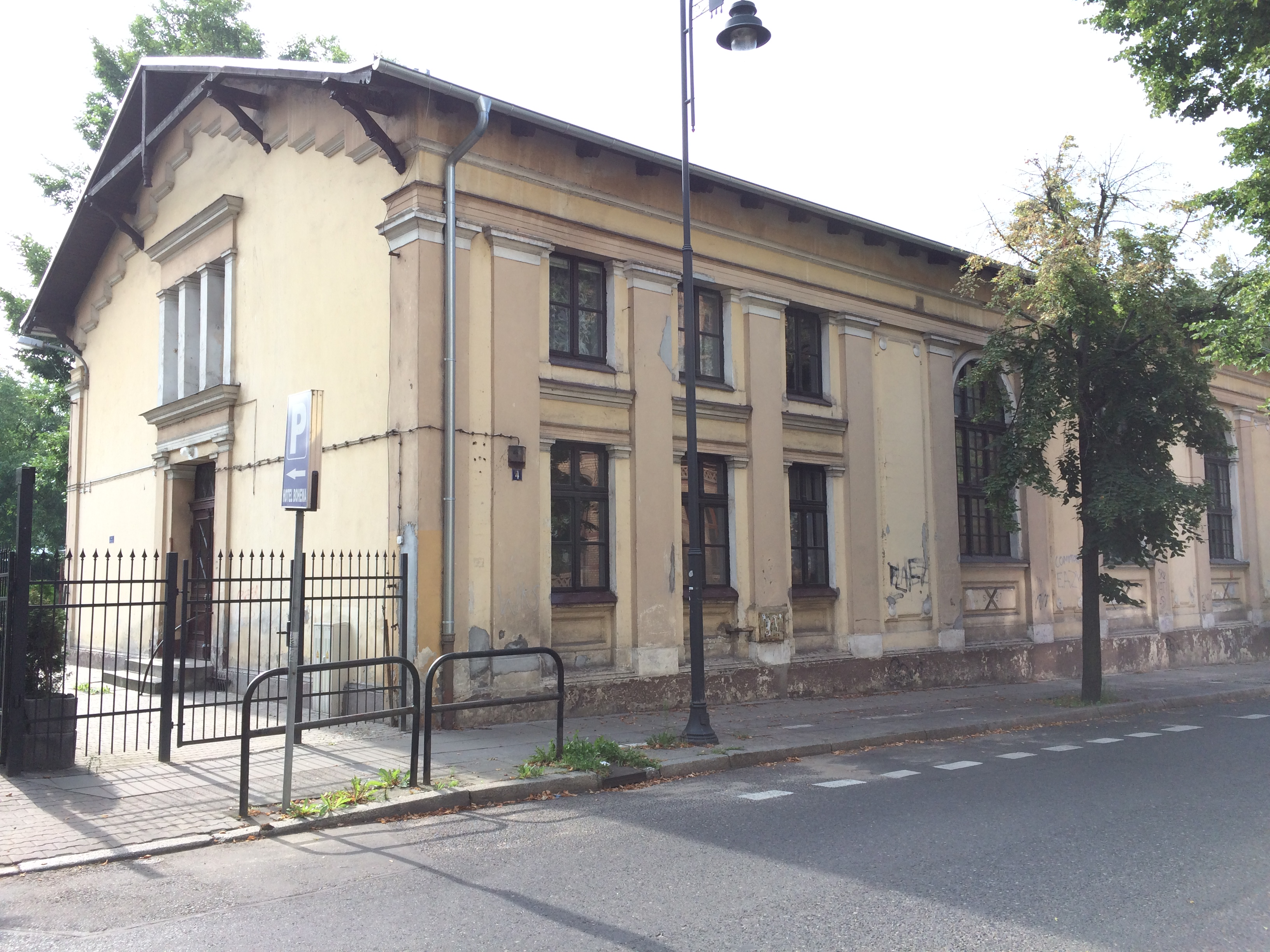
Sports hall from the street

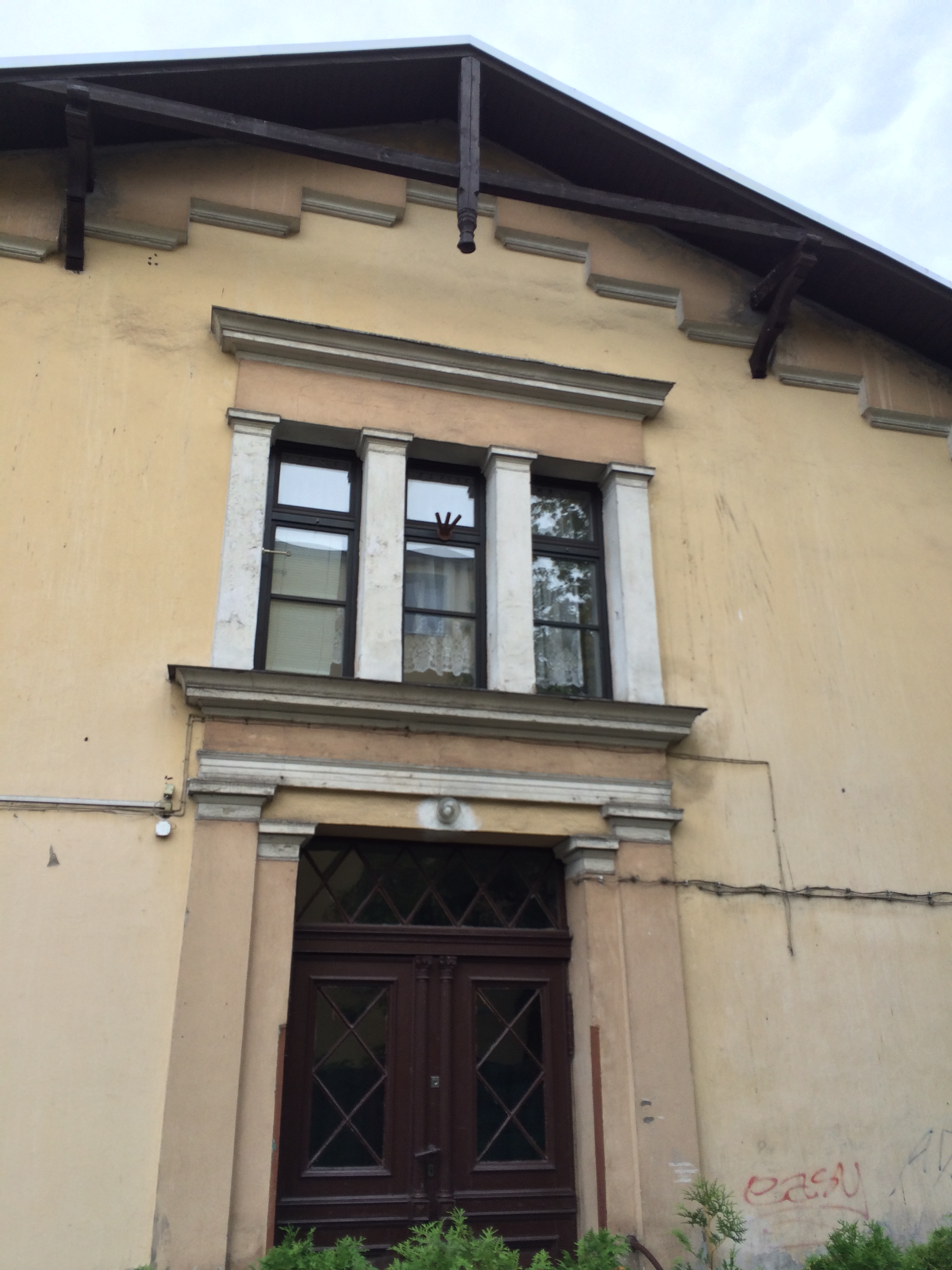
Main entry

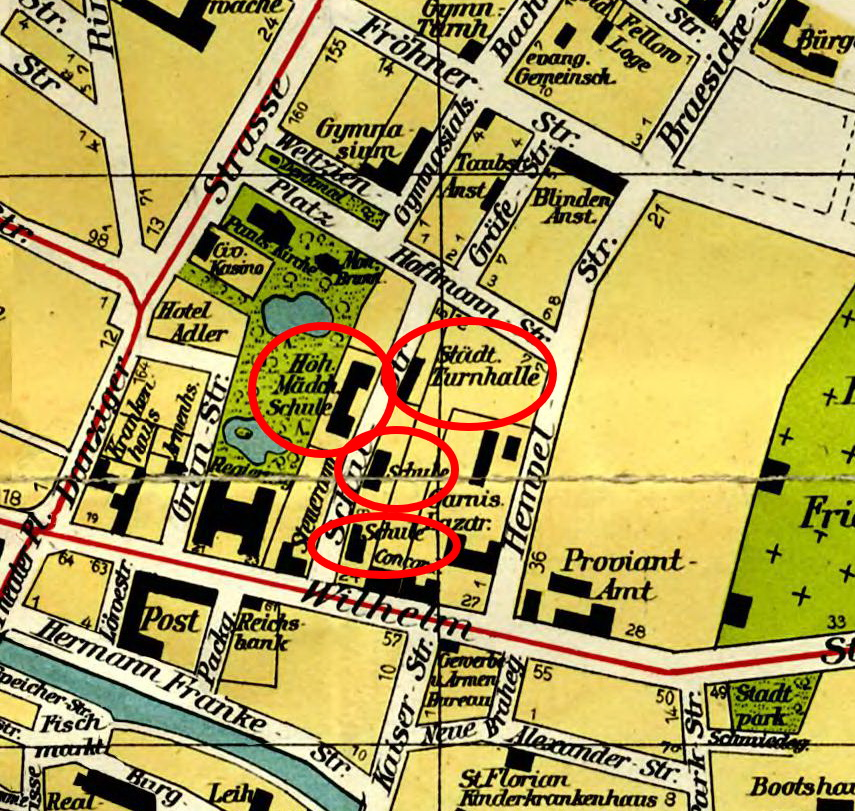
The sports hall (Turnhalle) and surrounding schools on a 1914 map of Bromberg

=== Building of the Catering School of Bydgoszcz, at 5 ===
1882–1884, by Wilhelm Lincke

Eclecticism

The building was designed to fit a [[Höhere Mädchenschule}]] school for girls established May 1853. Despite the high tuition fee, the edifice was too large and exceeded the needs. Hence, the school was split in 1909-1911 into an urban high school, a four-year teachers' college and a two-year school for educators nurseries and kindergartens (German: Frauenschule). In these schools, most of the students were from German origin. In 1920, the building housed the Faculty for girls, as men's one was located in the same street at Nr.2. In 1928, this girls institution received the patron name of Maria Konopnicka. Despite its success (719 pupils in 1925), the 1932 new education system put an end to the university: in 1935, the facility was combined with men's high school and moved to a building at Chwytowo street 16. During World War II, the building was converted to a field hospital.

In 1946, Public School Nr.6 was located there. In 1952, the building housed a vocational school for clothing and catering. In 1978, the name changed to the "School of Clothing and Cuisine in Bydgoszcz" (Polish: Zespół Szkół Gastronomicznych i Odzieżowych w Bydgoszczy), converted in 1984 into the Catering School. It comprised the following departments: Gastronomic Vocational School, Technical Gastronomy, Catering for Technical Workers. In 1990, the school opened new secondary vocational curriculum. In September 2006, a new building was opened, after 78 years without extension. In March 2011, the school received the ISO 9001 certificate.

The original building has two-storey, a basement, and is covered with a low hip roof. The block possesses small wings, and displays three avant-corps on the street. The plastered brick facade is decorated with friezes. Each level is separated by cornices and wide geometric patterns. Each avant-corps is topped by a prominent gable, supported by corbels. Windows are semicircular, and the main door is adorned with a high brick portal. The 2006 addition is located in the backyard, giving onto Casimir the Great Park.

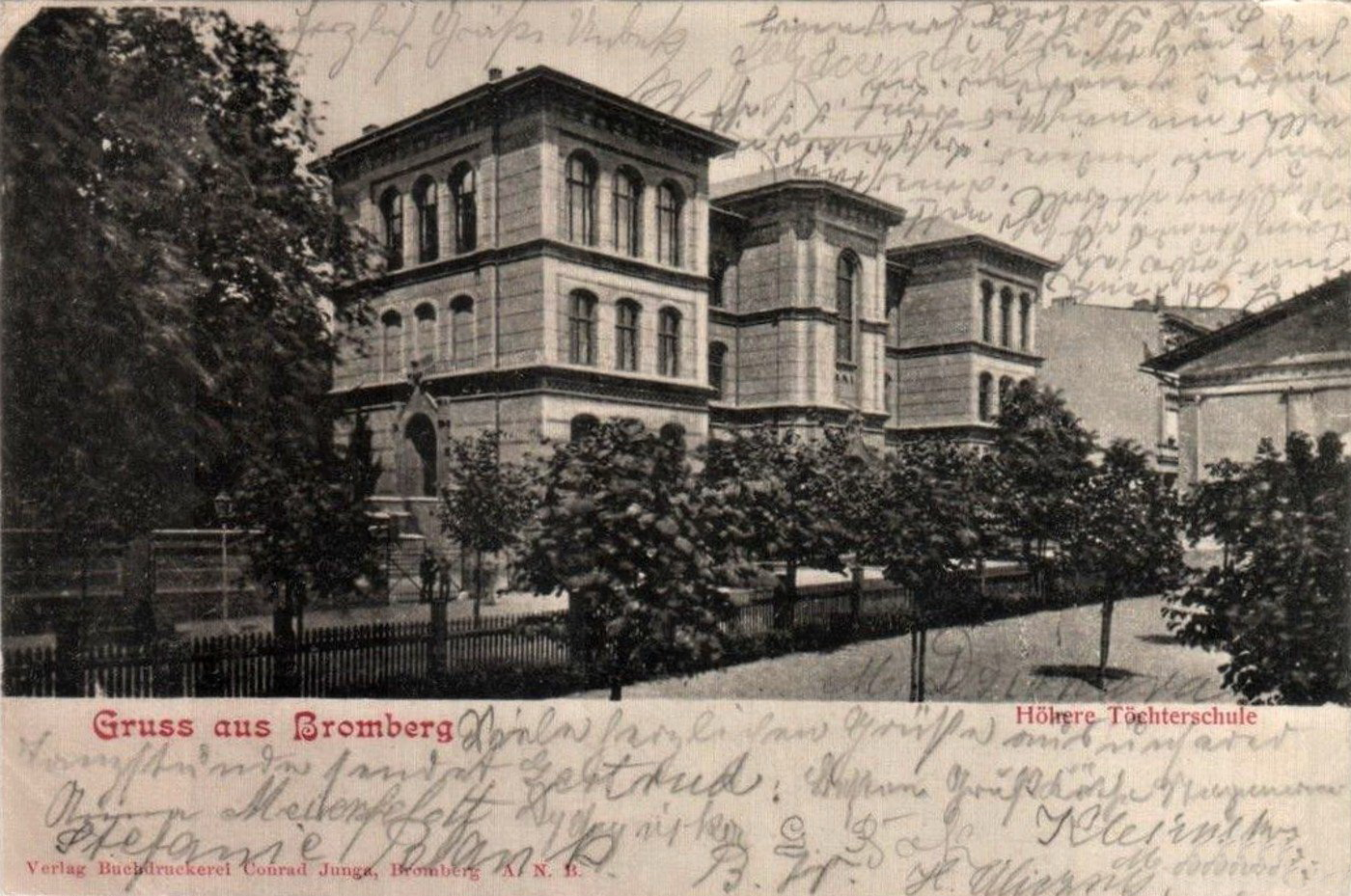
Building ca 1901

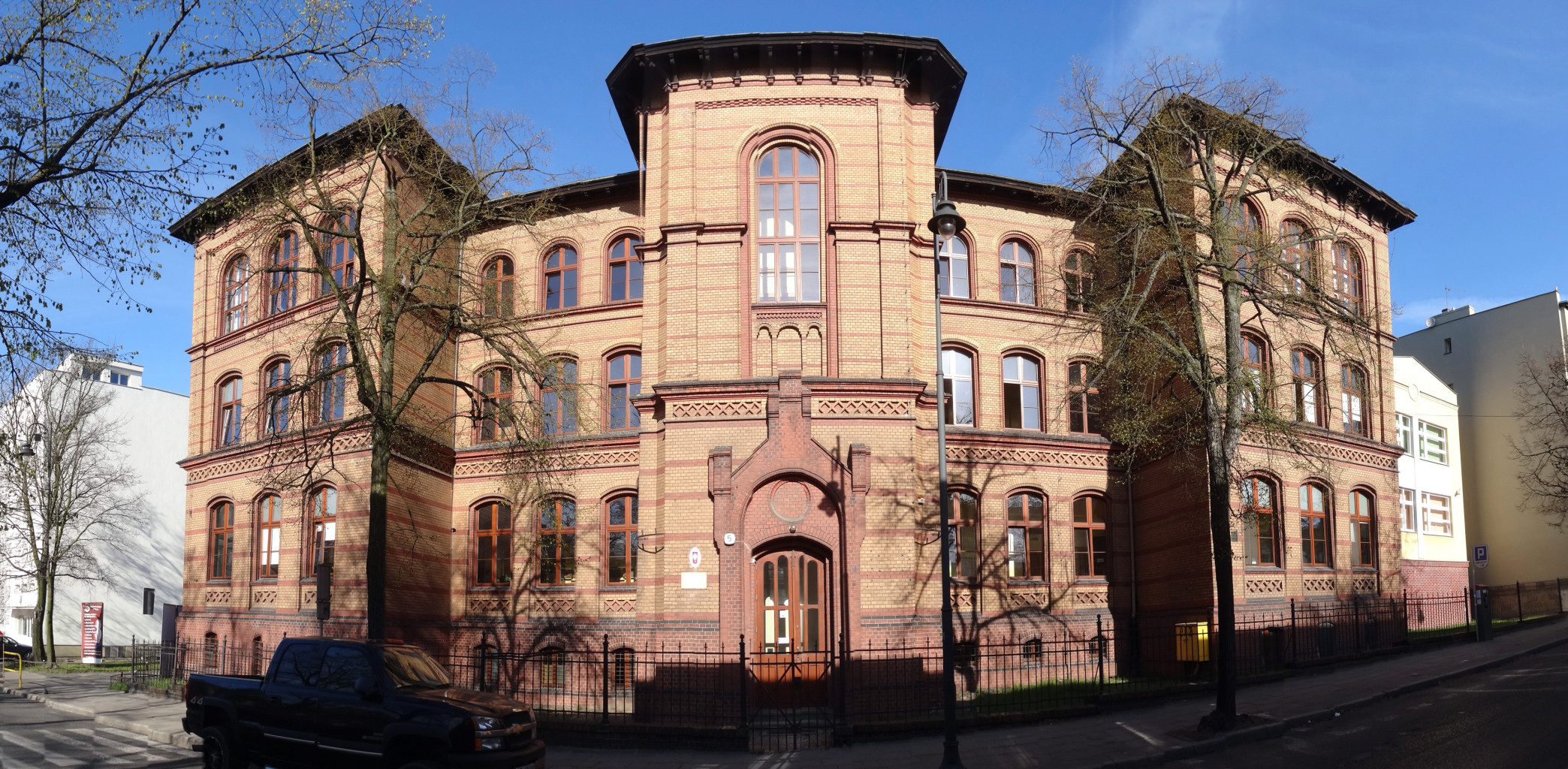
Main elevation on Konarskiego street

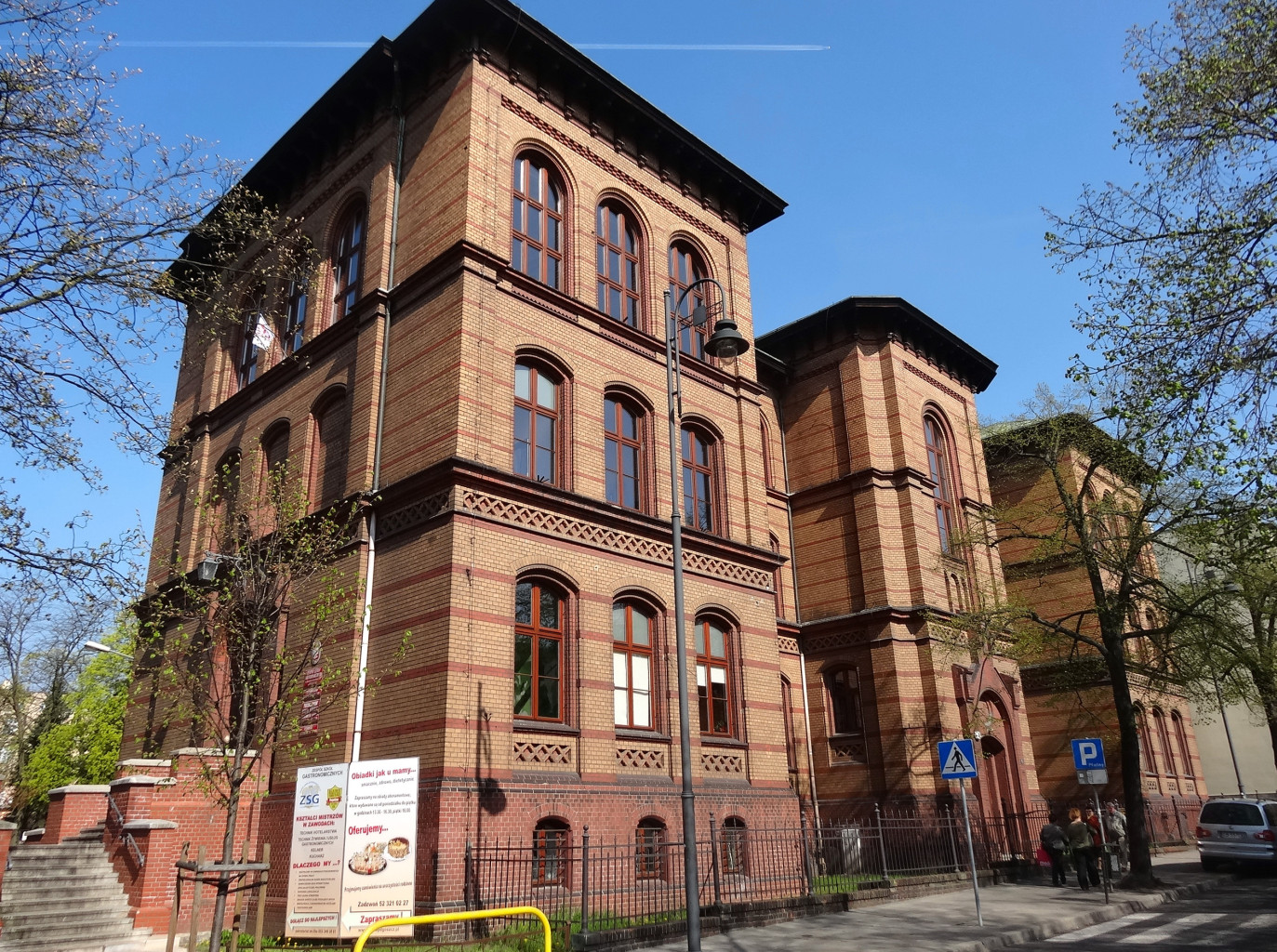
One of the three avant-corps

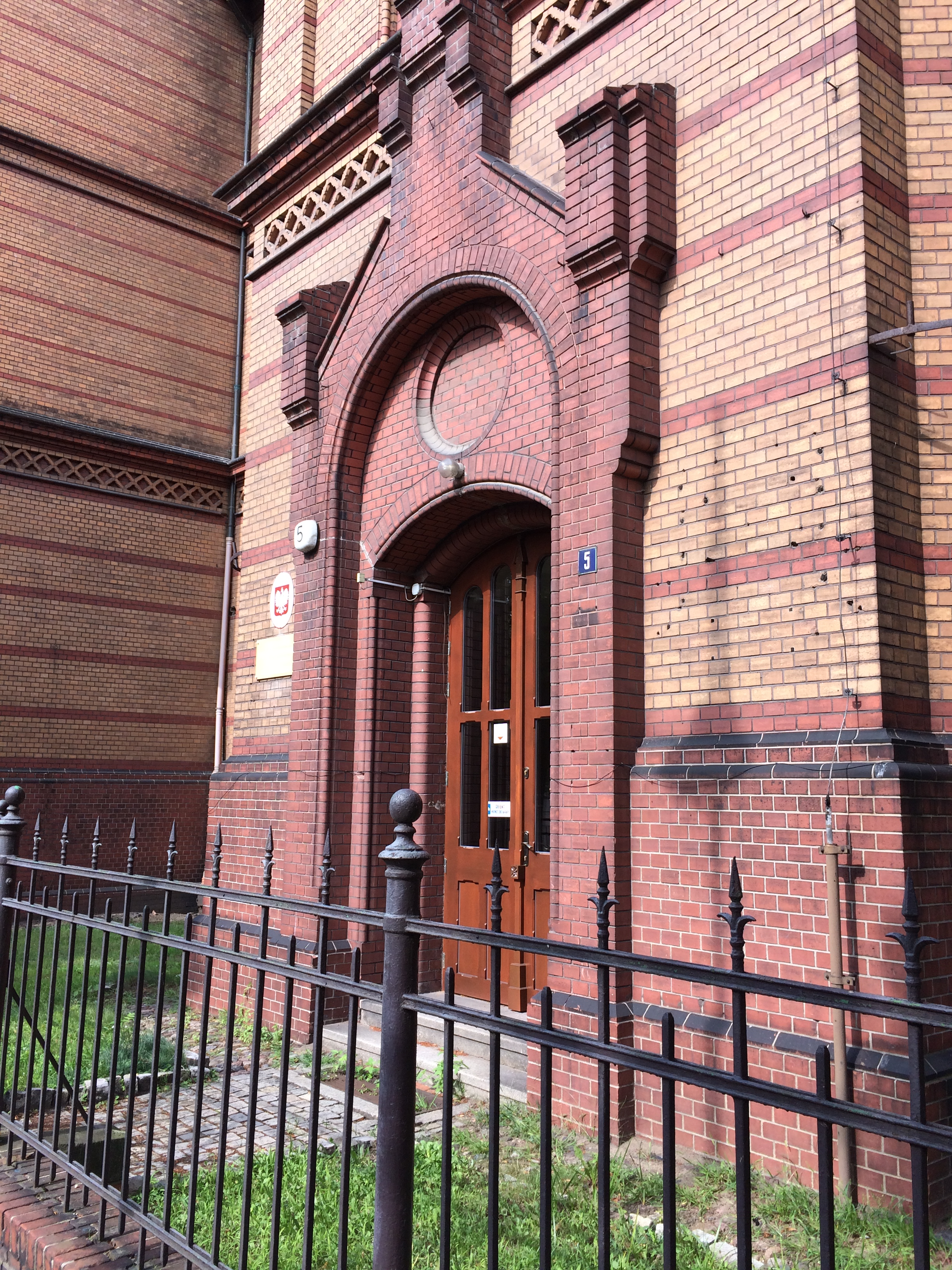
Main entry gate

=== Tenement at 6 ===
ca 1950-1960s

Functionalism

This recent building from the second half of the 20th century, is a perfect illustration of functionalism style. It boasts two avant-corps on its edges. In this regard, it recalls early modern architecture tenement at Plac Wolności 7 or others in Gdańska Street (Nr.23 & 188 for instance).

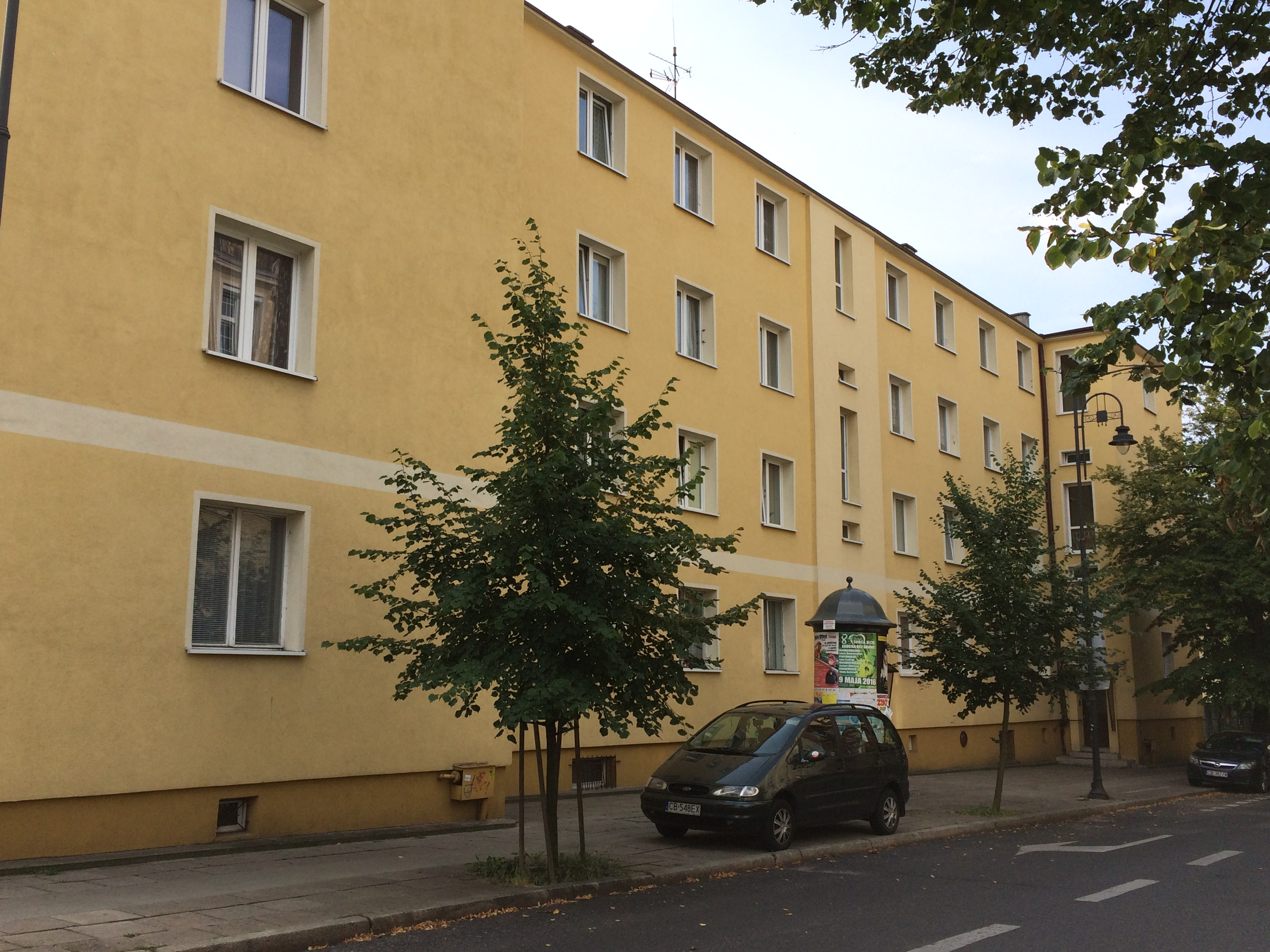
View from the street

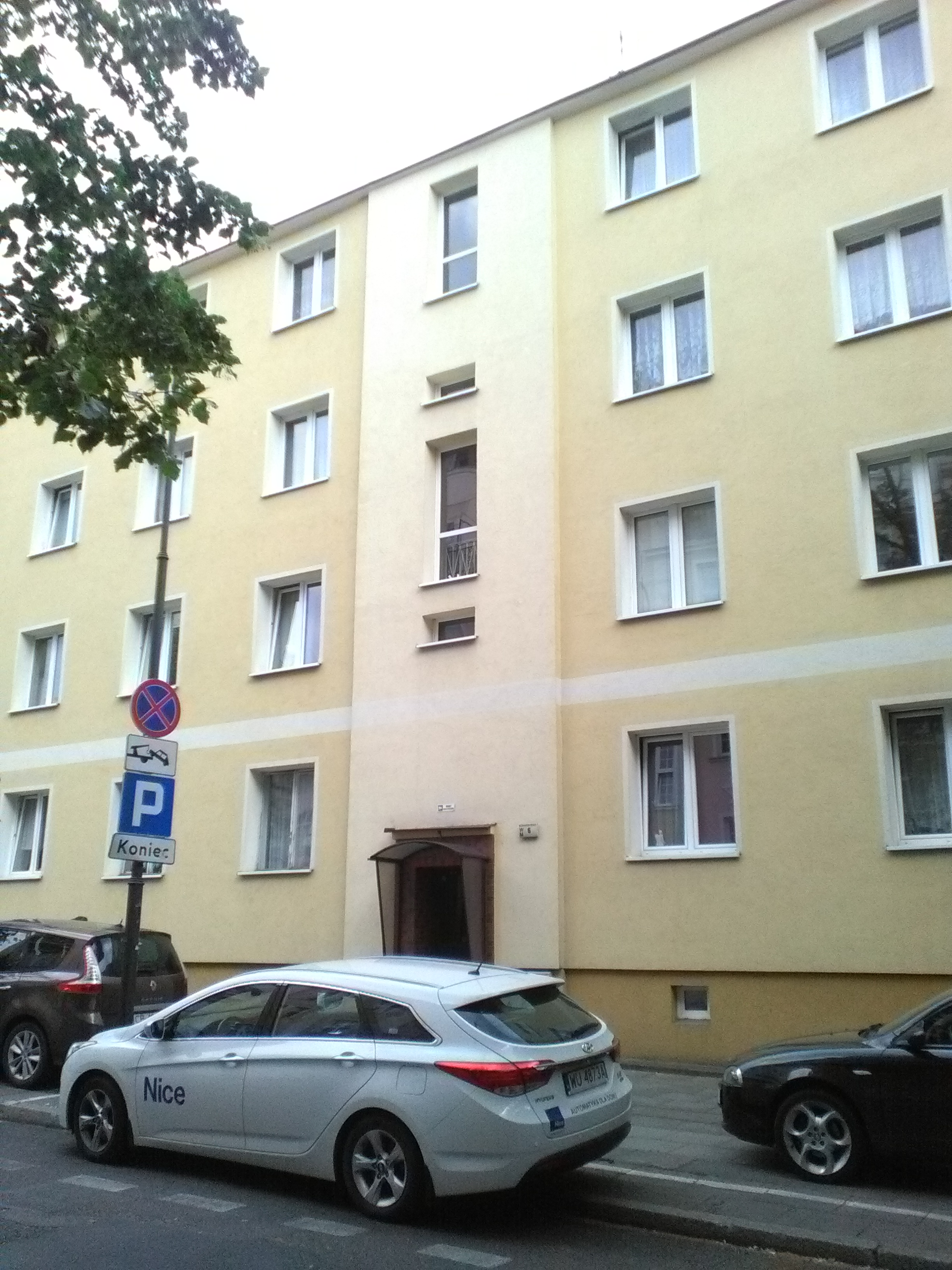
View from the street

=== Tenement at 7 ===
1875

Eclecticism

Initially Schule straße 2, it was owned by Albert Giese, who never lived in. The building was designed as a tenement house with flats for rent. In 1900, Richard Lampe, a physician living at 35 Gdanska street, bought the tenement: as a surgeon, specialized in women's diseases, he opened a clinic in the building. In 1920, widowed Janina Zabłocka and her children moved there from the Eastern Borderlands at the end of WWI. His son Tadeusz will be a diplomat and a successful entrepreneur in England after WWII, in particular with his shipping company "Tazab", allowing Poles in exile to send parcels with food and medicines to their relatives in Poland.

The tenement displays Neo-Renaissance features. Each second-level window of the facade is flanked with minutely designed pilasters and topped with pediment. Likewise, the main entry gate has pilasters on its sides, adorned with floral motifs.

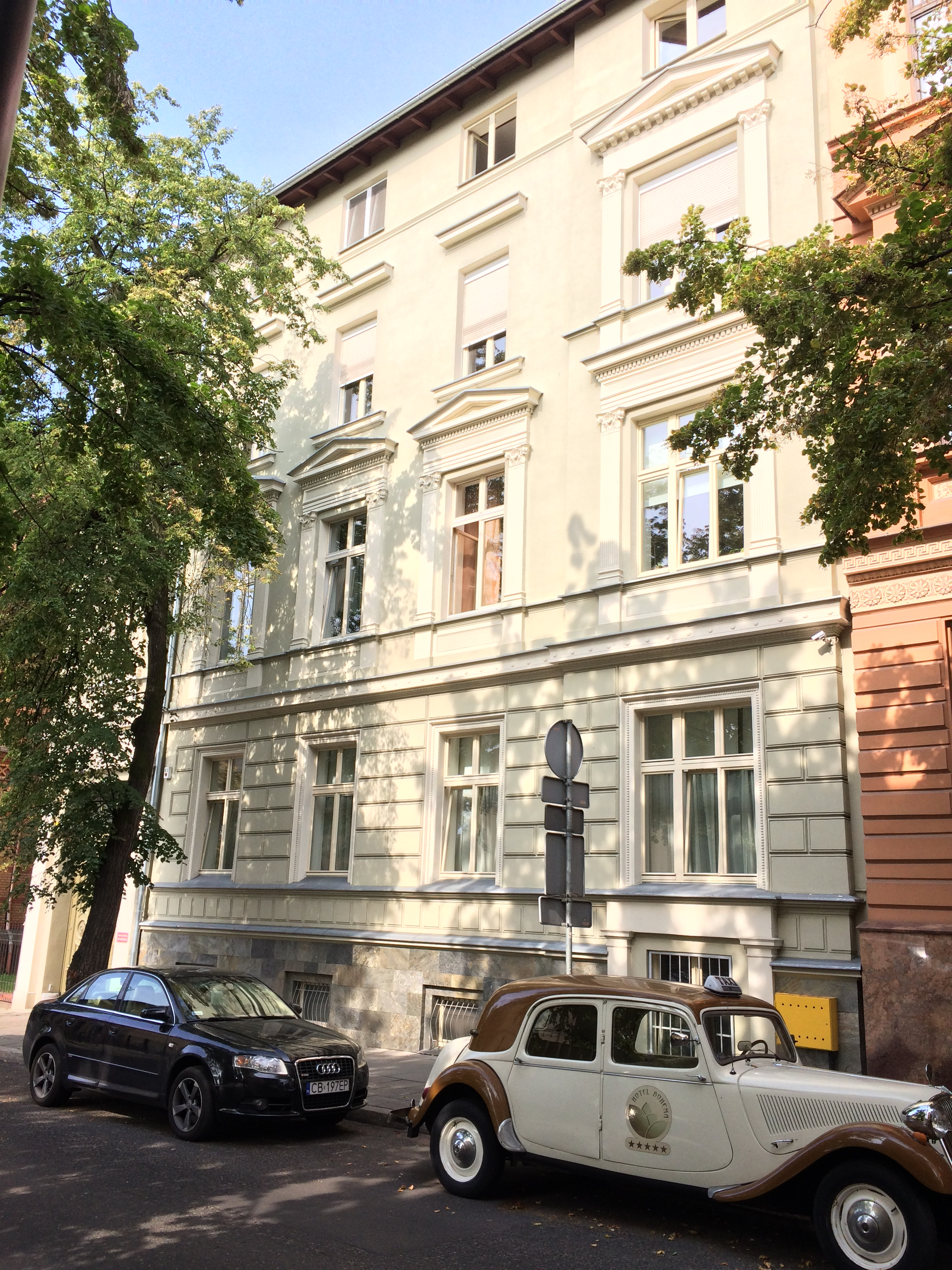
Main elevation on the street

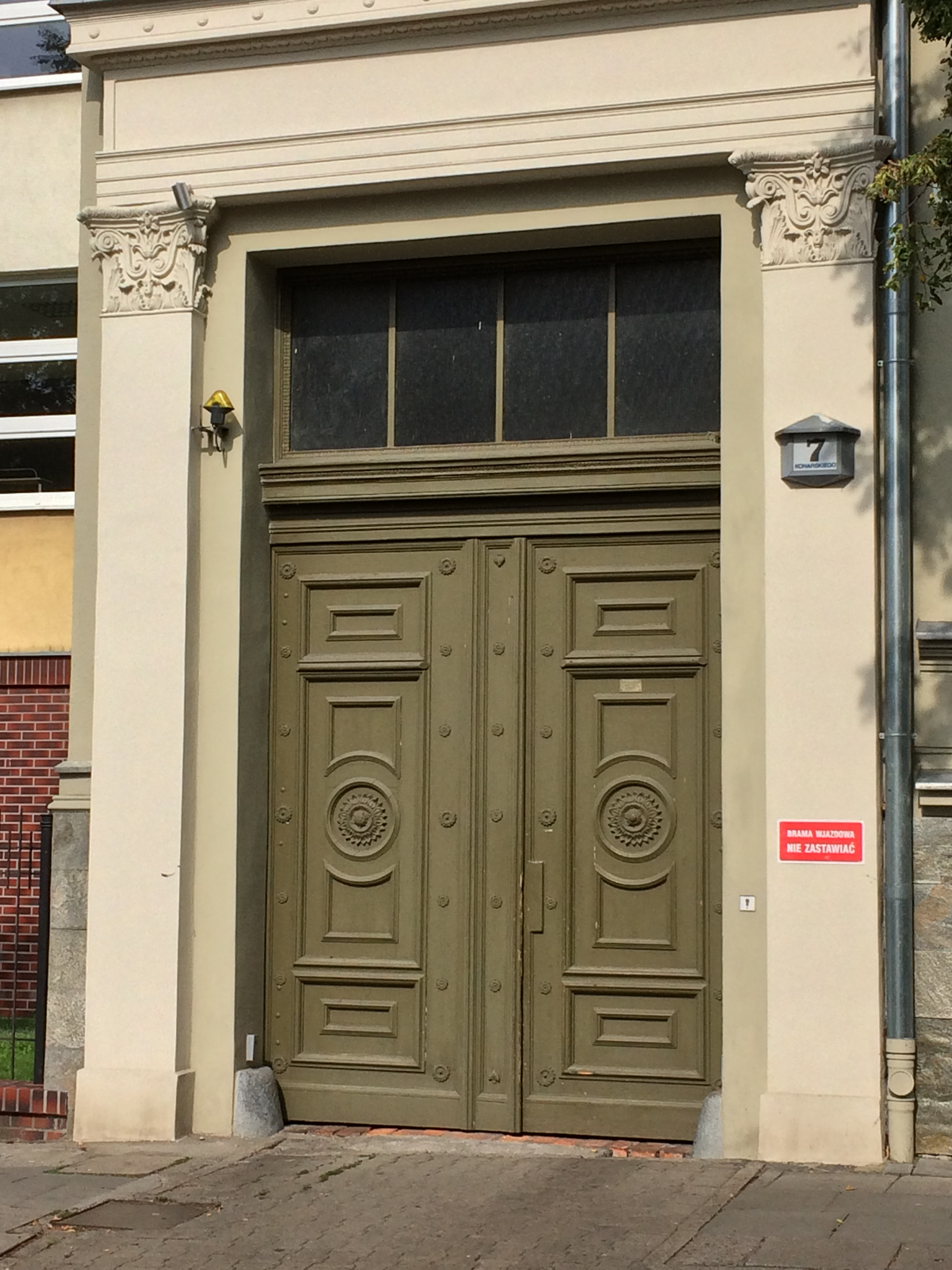
Main gate

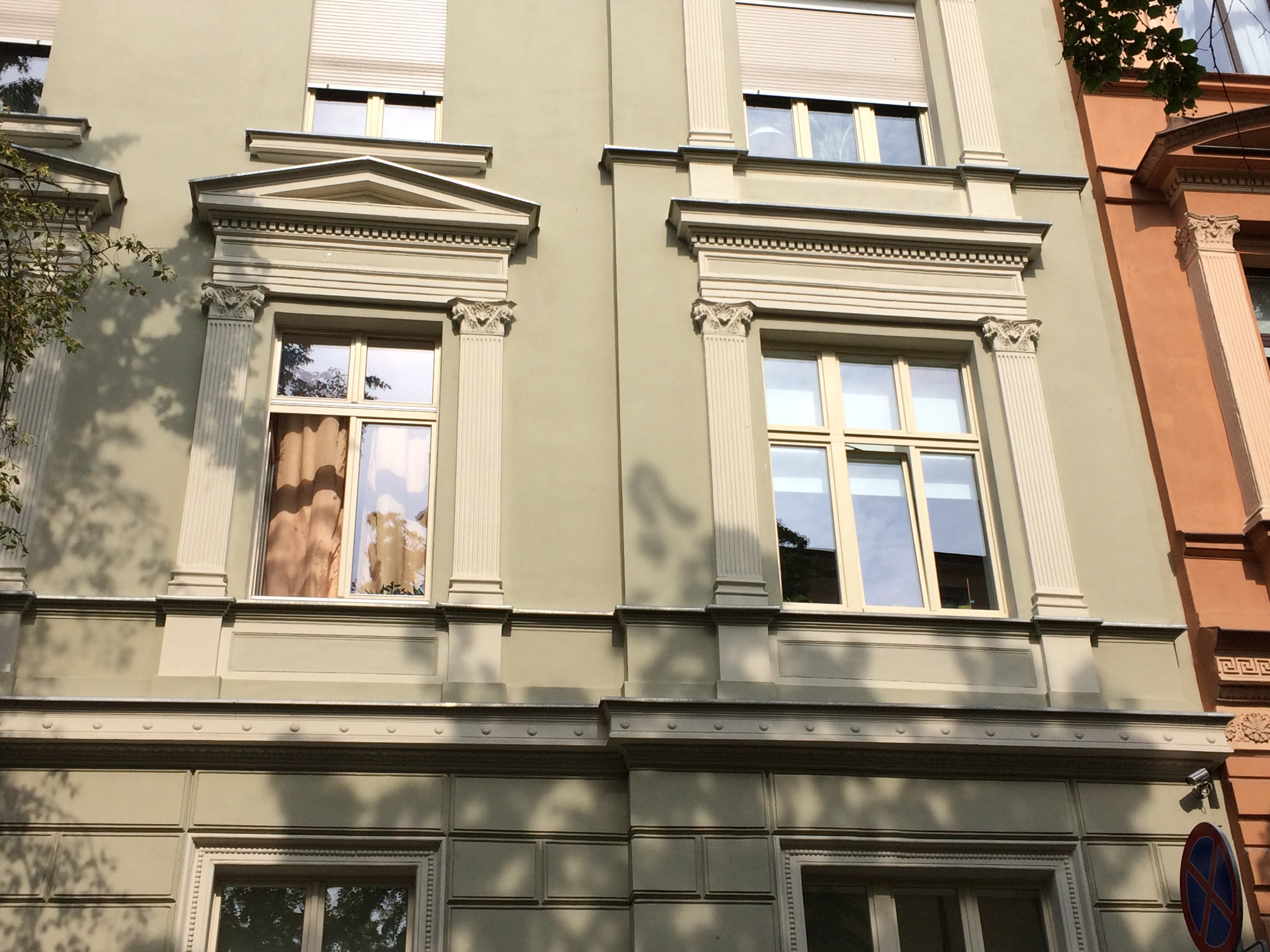
Architectural details of the facade

=== Hotel "Bohema", at 9 ===
Kuyavian-Pomeranian Heritage list Nr.A/1385, 16 September 2008

1877, by Anton Hoffmann

Eclecticism

Originally designed as a complex of renting flats, the building became in 2008 a 5-star rated hotel, "Bohema Hotel".

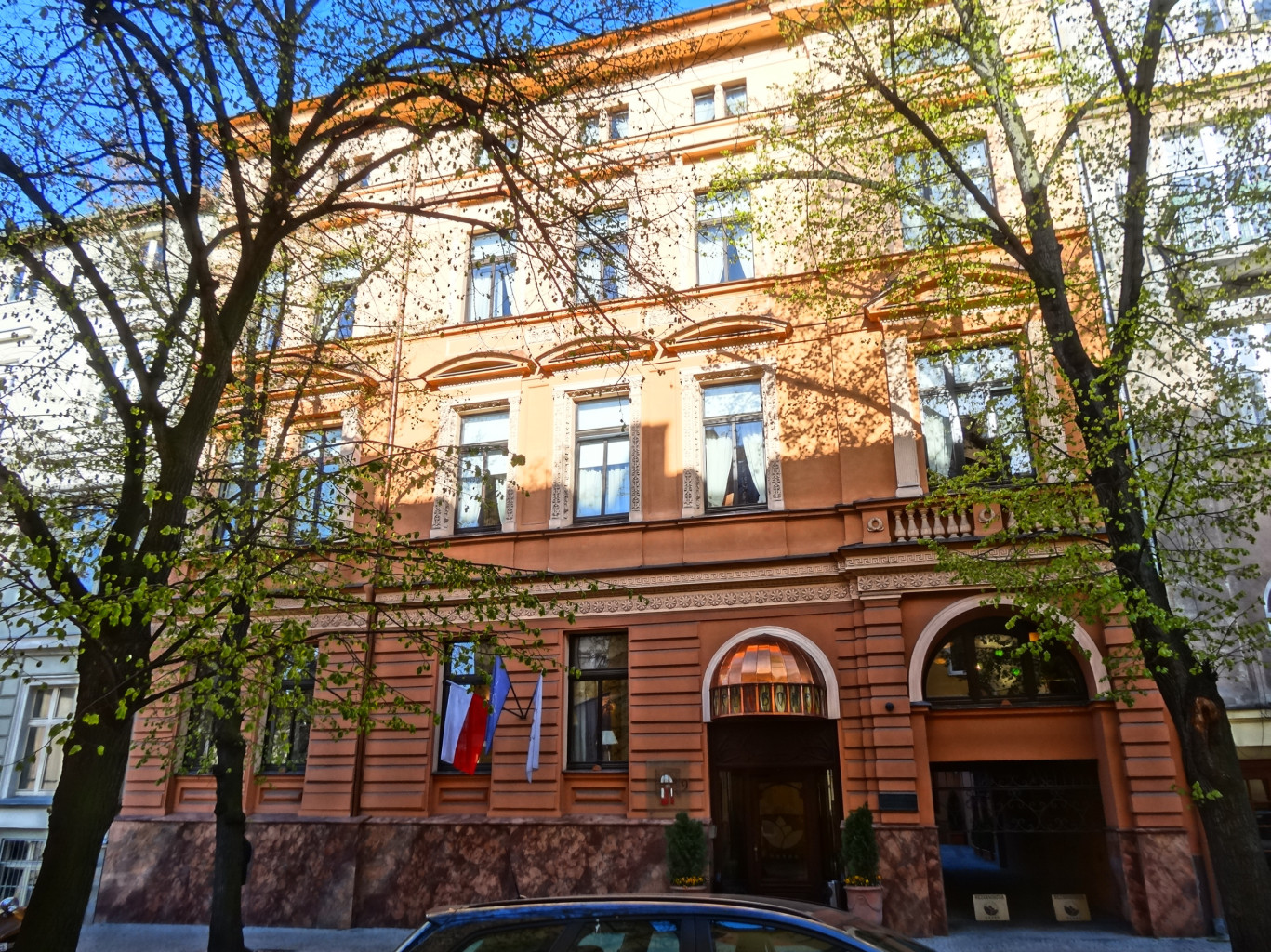
Main elevation on the street

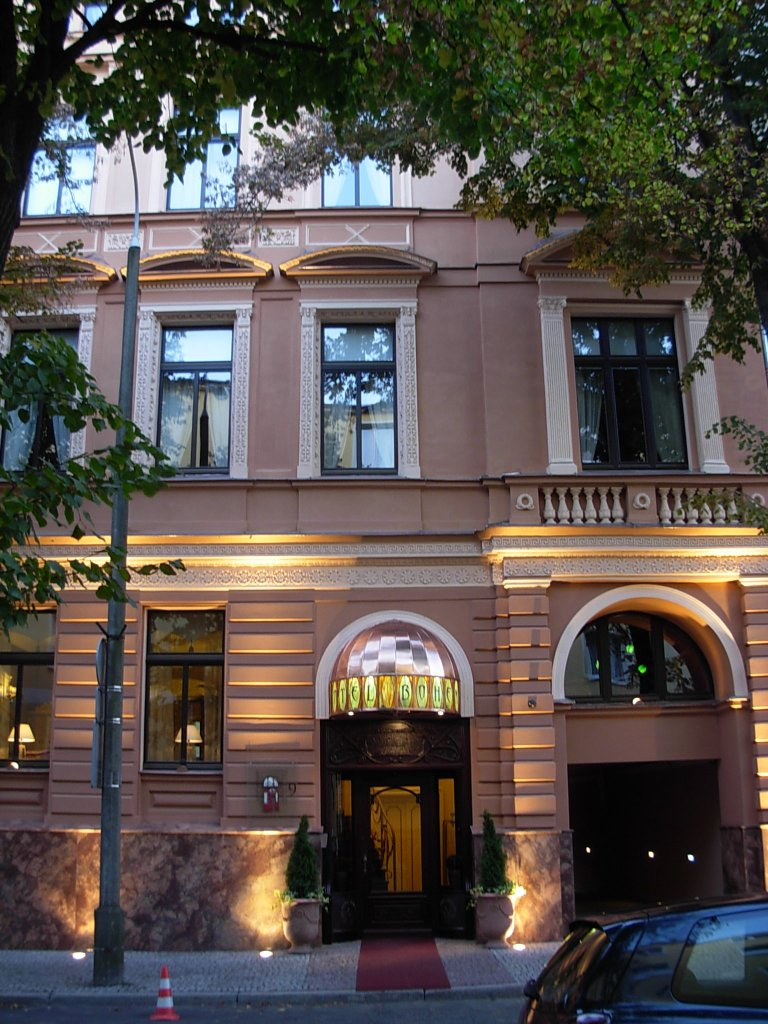
By night

=== Tenement at 11 ===
ca 1910

Art Nouveau

Referenced initially as Schulstraße 4/5, the building was conceived as a tenement house for flat renting. His first landlord was a dentist, Sallh Jacobowski, living at Danzigerstraße 165a (now 10 Gdańska Street). It then became the property of various rentiers, and accommodated an average of 15 tenants till the outbreak of World War II. Anecdotal detail, a dentist practitioner is installed today in this building.

The edifice features a mix of eclecticism (wooden loggias and balconies, neo-classical motifs) and Art Nouveau (round shapes, curved entry gate, ogee gables) style and details. One can notice, among others:

- wooden balconies and loggias on the park facade and in the backyard;
- a bartizan wedged on the elevation giving onto the park;
- the main wood door, topped by a transom light, and enclosed in an ogee portal.
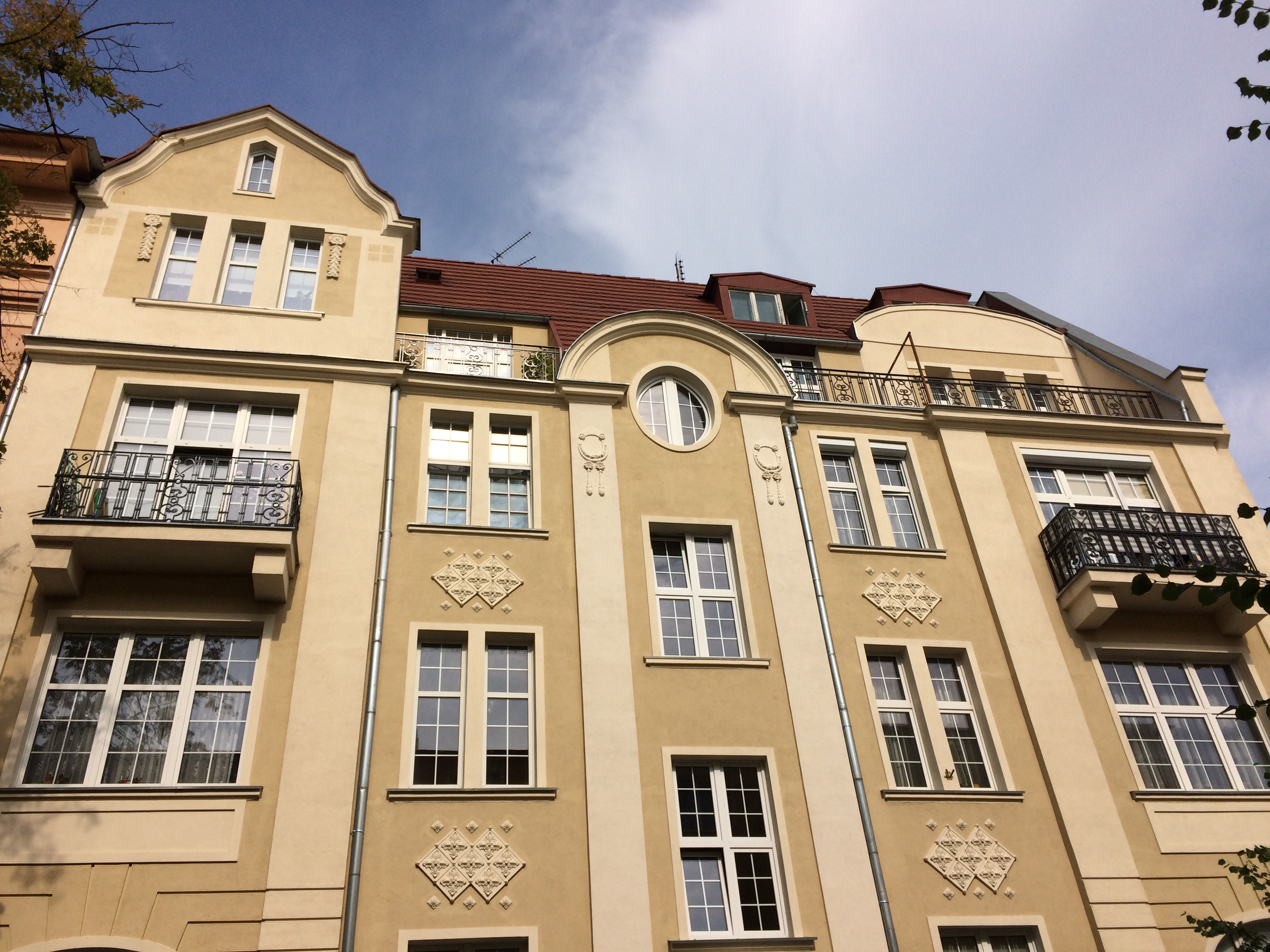
Main elevation on the street

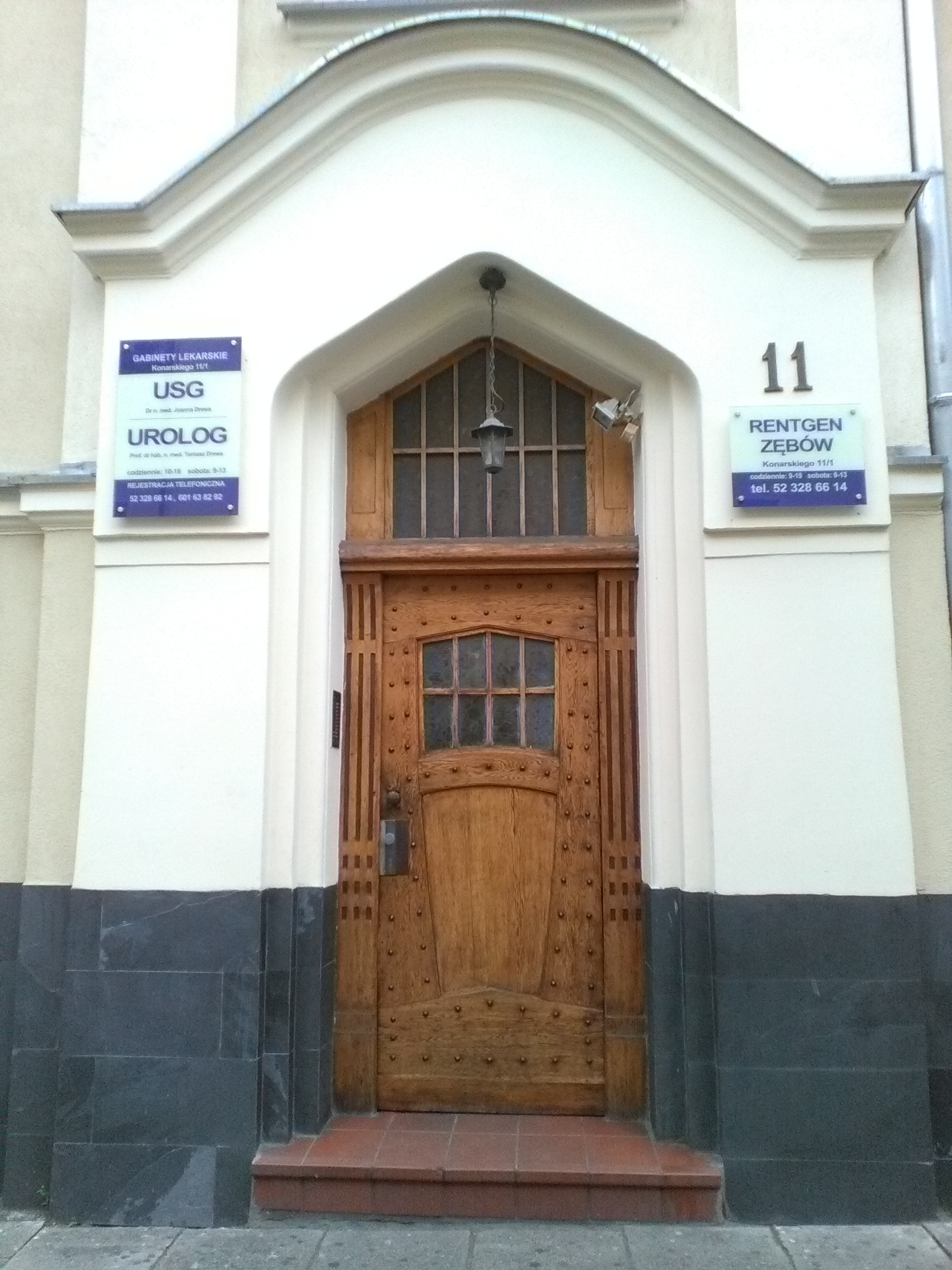
Ornamented portal

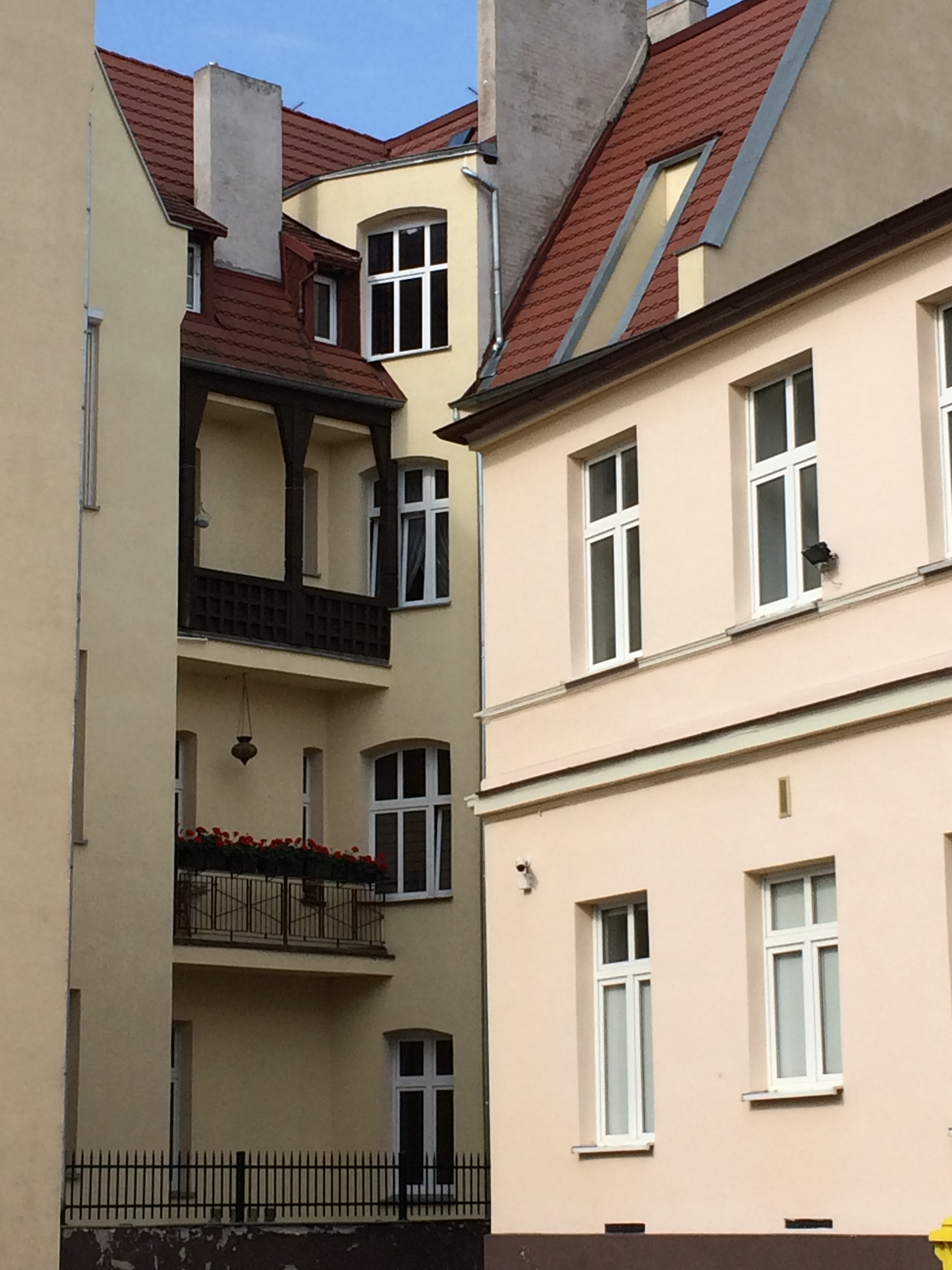
Backyard details

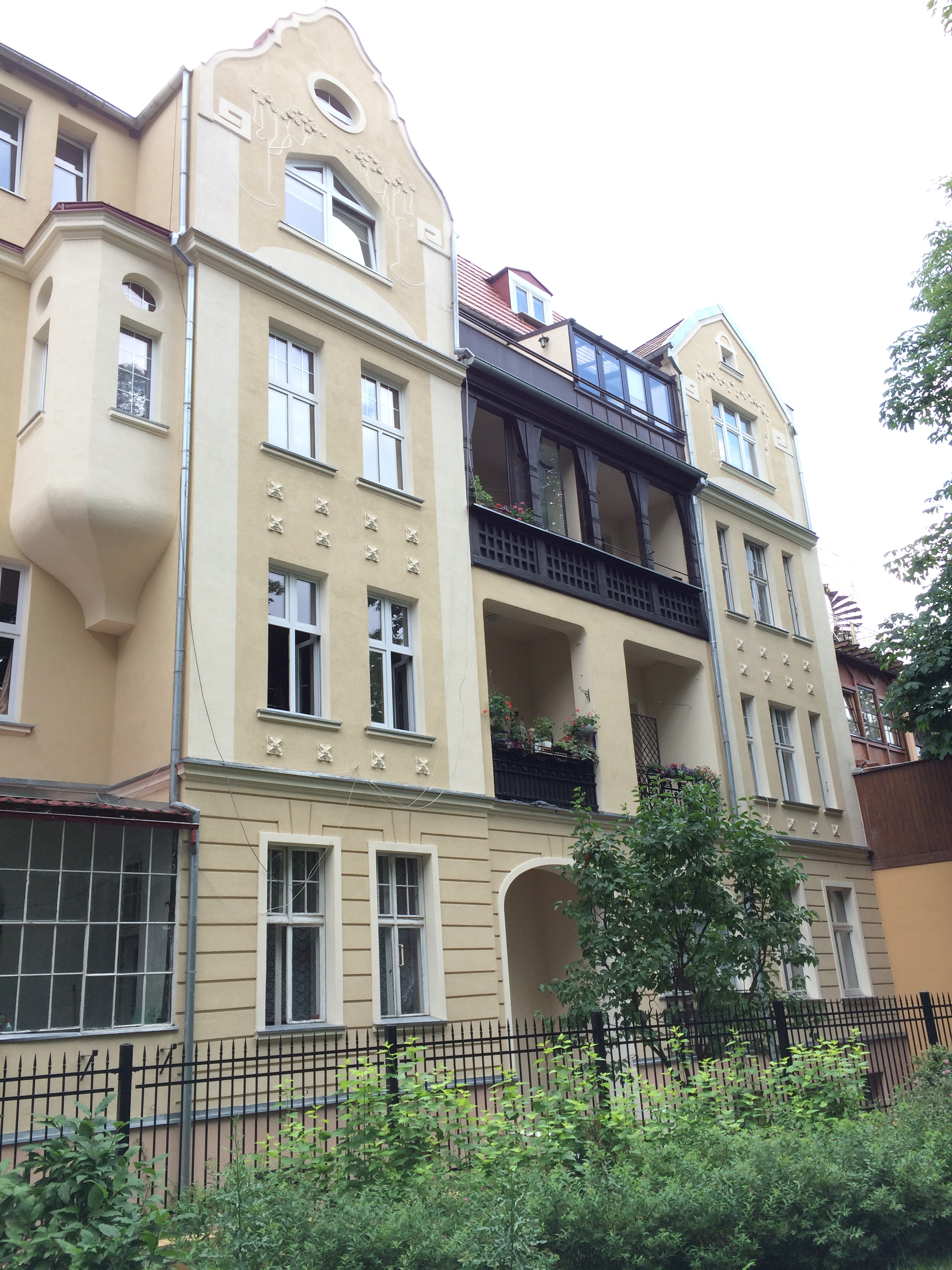
Facade on the park

== See also ==
- Bydgoszcz
- Piotra Skargi Street in Bydgoszcz
- Gdańska Street, Bydgoszcz
- Freedom Square, Bydgoszcz
- Jagiellońska street in Bydgoszcz
- Casimir the Great Park

== Bibliography ==
- (in Polish) Umiński, Janusz (1996). Bydgoszcz. Przewodnik. Bydgoszcz: Regionalny Oddział PTTK „Szlak Brdy”.
- (in Polish) Parucka, Krystyna (2008). Zabytki Bydgoszczy – minikatalog. Bydgoszcz: "Tifen" Krystyna Parucka.
