= Julius Grey House =

Julius Grey house in Bydgoszcz
- Polish: Kamienica Juliusa Greya w Bydgoszczy
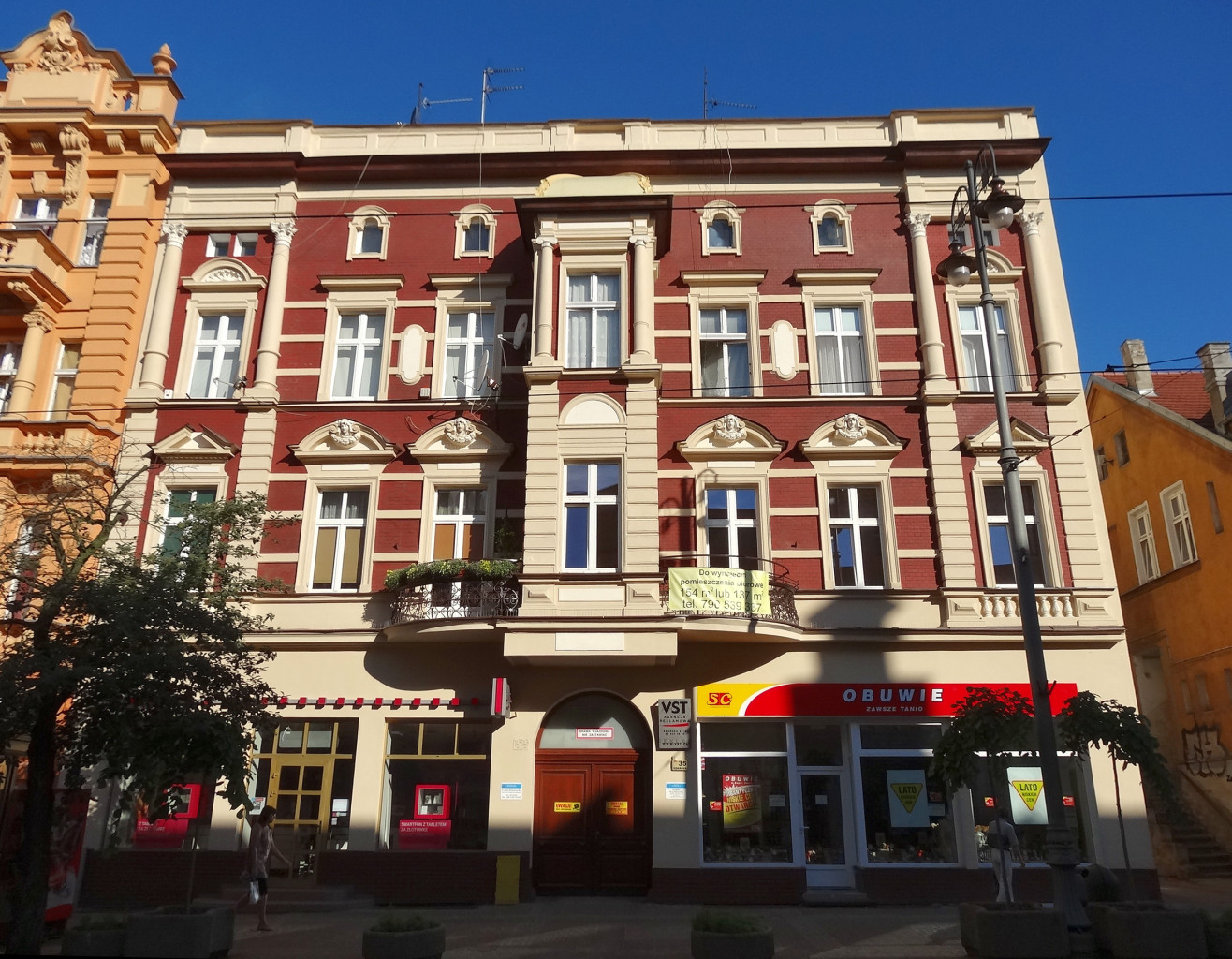
- View from Gdańska street
- Interactive map of the Julius Grey house in Bydgoszcz area

General information
- Type: Tenement
- Architectural style: Eclecticism
- Location: 35 Gdańska street, Bydgoszcz, Poland, Poland
- Coordinates: 53°7′40″N 18°0′18″E
- Completed: 1887
- Renovated: 1909
- Client: Julius Grey

Technical details
- Floor count: 3

Design and construction
- Architects: Hermann Lewandowski (1887) & Rudolf Kern (1909)

The Julius Grey house is a historical building in downtown Bydgoszcz, at 35 Gdańska Street.

== Location ==
The building stands on the west side of Gdańska Street between Dworcowa and Śniadeckich streets.

== History ==
=== Origins ===
The investor was Julius Grey, a baker, which ran there a bakery then a confectionery factory in 1883. At this time, the address was 23 Danzigerstraße

Juilius Grey decided to have this place rebuilt and asked, in 1887, master builder Hermann Lewandowski, living at 13 Louisenstrasse (now Hetmanska street) to manage the project. The same Lewandowski will later support the building of the grand edifice at 1 Plac Wolności.

In 1909, the house has been rebuilt, designed by Rudolf Kern. This architect had already realized several edifices renovation in Bromberg:

- a tenement at 5 Gdańska street in the same year;
- houses in Gdanska street (at 66-68, 67 & 158);
- a tenement at 10 Cieszkowskiego Street in 1902–1903.

=== Pastry shop ===
During interwar period, the Grey family ran on the groung floor a pastry shop (Polish: Cukiernia), see advertisement picture in the gallery), which was famous for the quality of its cakes.

Stanislaw Hass, a pastry chef who had been running café Cristal at 1 Freedom Square, moved to the former premises of the Grey family, at 35 Gdańska street, where part of the Grey's equipment and stocks were still available. Until 2003, the "Cristal" cafe with its typical Art Nouveau décor has been located here, even when the Hass family moved the pastry in the 1960s.

== Architecture ==
The building was built in the style of Eclecticism using forms of German Historicism.

The edifice is remarkable by two symmetric rounded shape balconies with forged railings: they both enclose the large bay window standing above the entrance gate.

Window pediments are decorated with figure of a woman head.

== Gallery ==
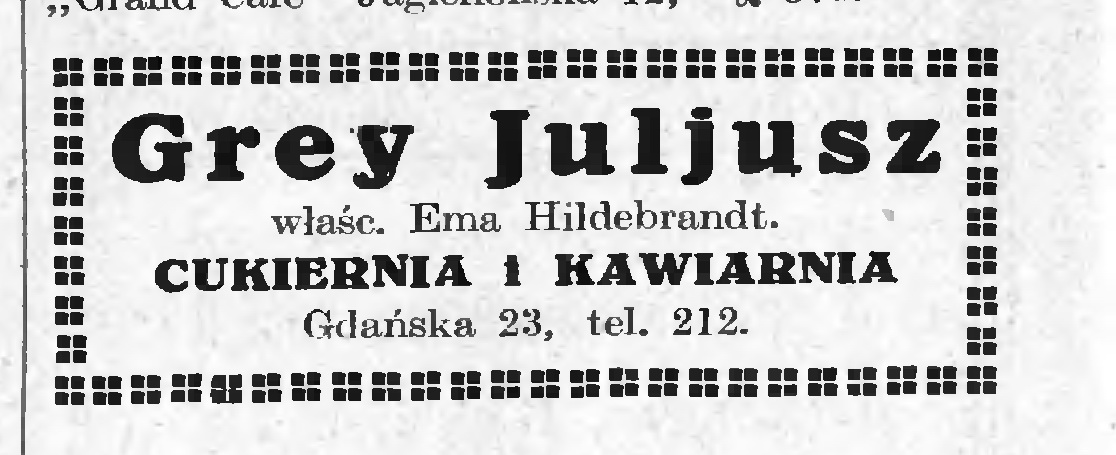
Advertisement for Grey family pastry shop in 1925

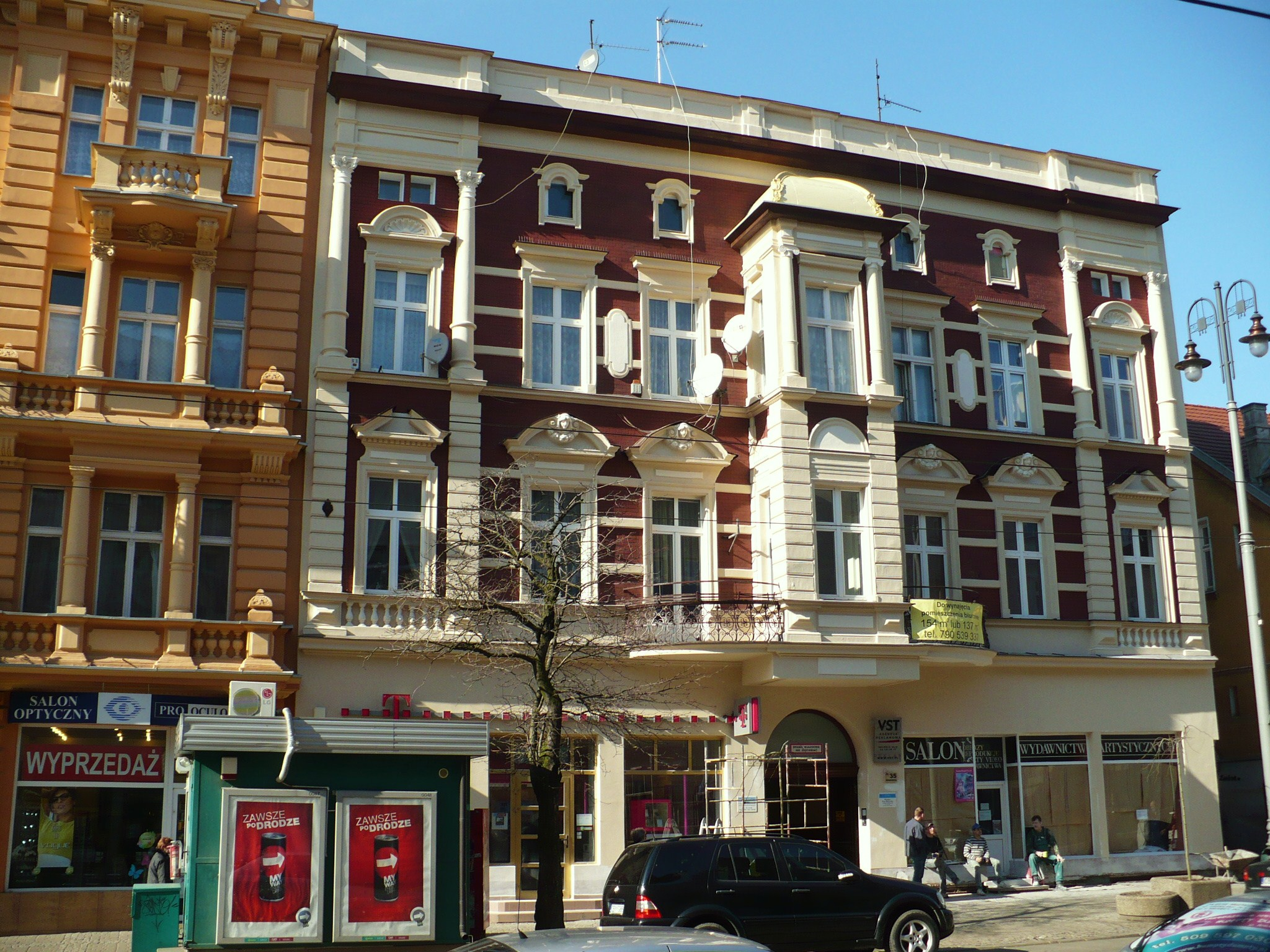
Enlarge view from Gdańska street, showing part of neighbouring facade of house at Gdańska street 33

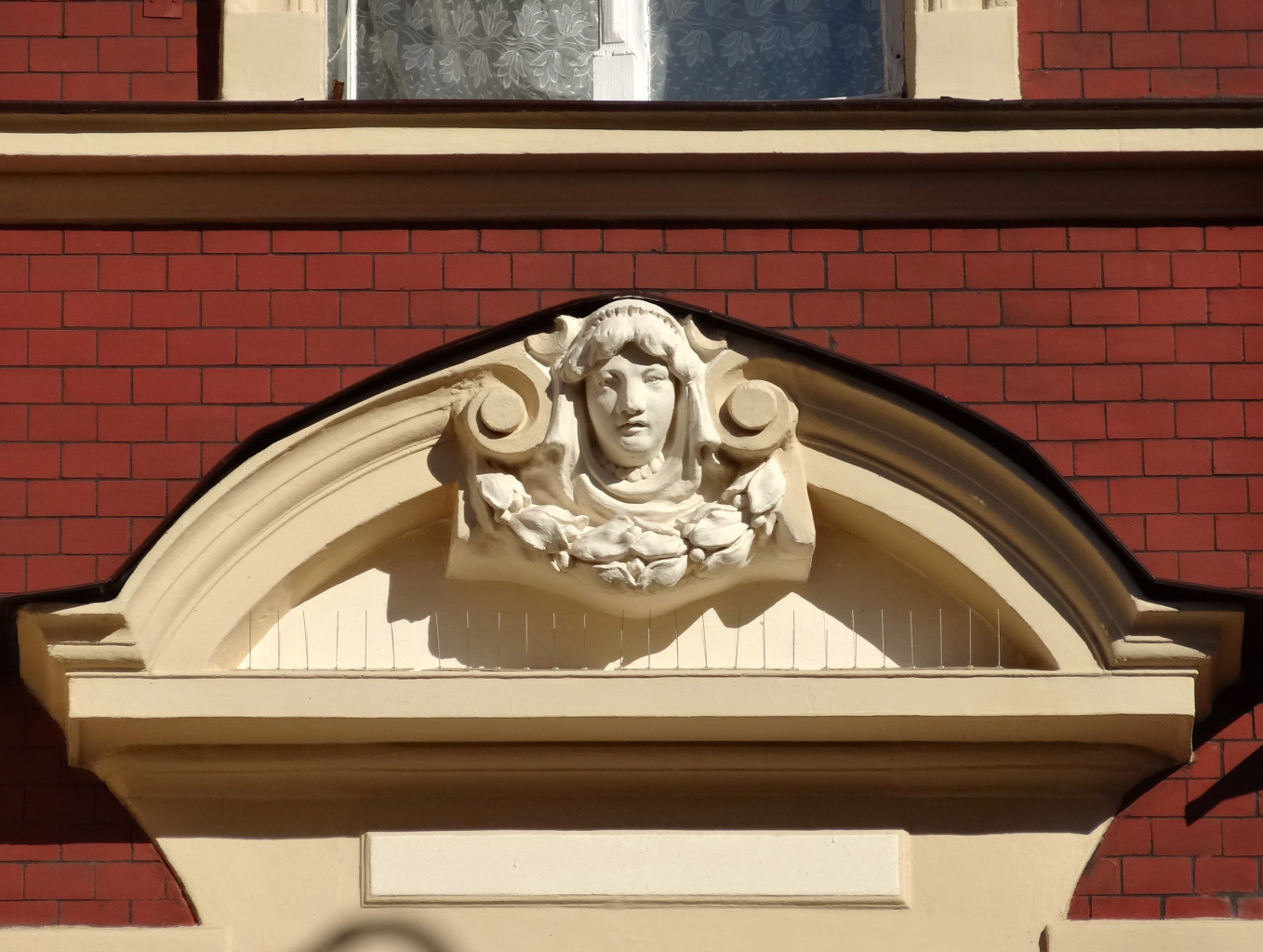
Pediment with woman figure

== See also ==
- Bydgoszcz
- Gdanska Street in Bydgoszcz
- Rudolf Kern
- (in Polish) Downtown district in Bydgoszcz

== Bibliography ==
- (in Polish) Bręczewska-Kulesza Daria, Derkowska-Kostkowska Bogna, Wysocka A. (2003). Ulica Gdańska. Przewodnik historyczny. Bydgoszcz: Wojewódzki Ośrodek Kultury w Bydgoszczy. ISBN 9788386970100.
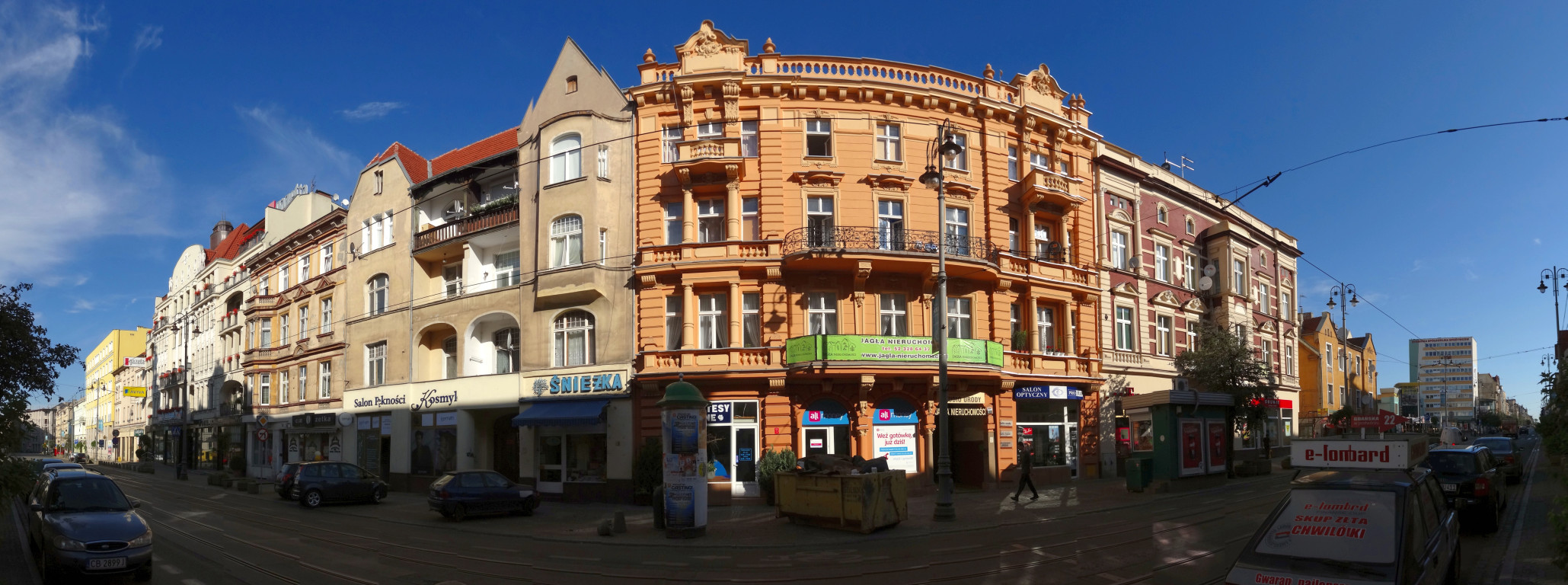
Facade panorama neighbouring house at Gdańska street 35
