= Graded absolutism =

Theory of moral absolutism in Christian ethics

Graded absolutism is a theory of moral absolutism (in Christian ethics) which resolves the objection to absolutism (i.e., in moral conflicts, we are obligated to opposites). Moral absolutism is the ethical view that certain actions are absolutely right or wrong regardless of other contexts such as their consequences or the intentions behind them. Graded absolutism is moral absolutism but qualifies that a moral absolute, like "Do not kill," can be greater or lesser than another moral absolute, like "Do not lie". Although 'which' absolutes are in conflict depends on the context, the determination of which 'absolute' is greater is based on objective criteria rather than on the context, which distinguishes graded absolutism from situational ethics. For example, in Christianity, the greater absolute is judged by how 'much greater' it aligns with the Great Commandments.

Also called contextual absolutism or the greater good view, it is an alternative to the third alternative view and the lesser evil view, both discussed below, regarding moral conflict resolution. It should not be confused with utilitarianism.

== The third alternative view ==
The third alternative view is the view that there are never any real moral conflicts and that there is always a third alternative. Thus, the moral conflict is a false dilemma. For example, instead of answering in the affirmative or negative to a Nazi asking if there are any Jews hiding in one's house, one may simply withhold an answer.

== The lesser evil view ==
The lesser of two evils principle is the view that the only way out of a moral conflict is to violate one of the moral absolutes and choose the lesser evil.

According to the proponents of graded absolutism, this violates the ought implies can principle because it is still possible to behave morally in this situation.

== The greater good view ==
The greater good view is the view that there are real moral conflicts between absolutes, but rather than requiring a third alternative (as in the case of the third alternative view above) or obligating evil (as in the case of the lesser evil view above), this view obligates the greater absolute, or greater good. For example, when one saves a life rather than telling the truth to a would-be murderer, one is committing the greater good of saving life, rather than violating the lesser good of telling the truth or committing the lesser (than aiding a murderer) evil of lying. Since evil is the privation of good, only the privation of the greater good counts as evil, since whenever there is a moral conflict, we are only obligated to the greater good.

== See also ==
- Moral absolutism
- Moral dilemma
- Moral universalism
- Prima facie right
- Situational ethics
- Value pluralism
