= Ethical dilemma =

Type of dilemma in philosophy

In philosophy, an ethical dilemma, also called an ethical paradox or moral dilemma, is a situation in which two or more conflicting moral imperatives, none of which overrides the other, confront an agent. A closely related definition characterizes an ethical dilemma as a situation in which every available choice is morally wrong. The term is also used in a wider sense in everyday language to refer to ethical conflicts that may be resolvable, to psychologically difficult choices or to other types of difficult ethical problems.

This article concerns ethical dilemmas in the strict philosophical sense, often referred to as genuine ethical dilemmas. Various examples have been proposed but there is disagreement as to whether these constitute genuine or merely apparent ethical dilemmas. The central debate around ethical dilemmas concerns the question of whether there are any. Defenders often point to apparent examples while their opponents usually aim to show their existence contradicts very fundamental ethical principles. Ethical dilemmas come in various types. An important distinction concerns the difference between epistemic dilemmas, which give a possibly false impression to the agent of an unresolvable conflict, and actual or ontological dilemmas. There is broad agreement that there are epistemic dilemmas but the main interest in ethical dilemmas takes place on the ontological level. Traditionally, philosophers held that it is a requirement for good moral theories to be free from ethical dilemmas. But this assumption has been questioned in contemporary philosophy.

== Definition ==
A person is in an ethical dilemma if they stand under several conflicting moral obligations and no obligation overrides the others. Two ethical requirements are conflicting if the agent can do one or the other but not both: the agent has to choose one over the other. Two conflicting ethical requirements do not override each other if they have the same strength or if there is no sufficient ethical reason to choose one over the other. Only this type of situation constitutes an ethical dilemma in the strict philosophical sense, often referred to as a genuine ethical dilemma. Other cases of ethical conflicts are resolvable and are therefore not ethical dilemmas strictly speaking. This applies to many instances of conflict of interest as well. For example, a businessman hurrying along the shore of a lake to a meeting is in an ethical conflict when he spots a drowning child close to the shore. But this conflict is not a genuine ethical dilemma since it has a clear resolution: jumping into the water to save the child significantly outweighs the importance of making it to the meeting on time. Also excluded from this definition are cases in which it is merely psychologically difficult for the agent to make a choice, for example, because of personal attachments or because the knowledge of the consequences of the different alternatives is lacking.

Ethical dilemmas are sometimes defined not in terms of conflicting obligations but in terms of not having a right course of action, of all alternatives being wrong. The two definitions are equivalent for many but not all purposes. For example, it is possible to hold that in cases of ethical dilemmas, the agent is free to choose either course of action, that either alternative is right. Such a situation still constitutes an ethical dilemma according to the first definition, since the conflicting requirements are unresolved, but not according to the second definition, since there is a right course of action.

== Examples ==
Various examples of ethical dilemmas have been proposed but there is disagreement as to whether these constitute genuine or merely apparent ethical dilemmas. One of the oldest examples is due to Plato, who sketches a situation in which the agent has promised to return a weapon to a friend, who is likely to use it to harm someone since he is not in his right mind. In this example, the duty to keep a promise stands in conflict with the duty to prevent that others are harmed. It is questionable whether this case constitutes a genuine ethical dilemma since the duty to prevent harms may outweigh the promise. Another well-known example comes from Jean-Paul Sartre, who describes the situation of one of his students during the German occupation of France. This student faced the choice of either fighting to liberate his country from the Germans or staying with and caring for his mother, for whom he was the only consolation left after the death of her other son. The conflict, in this case, is between a personal duty to his mother and the duty to his country. The novel Sophie's Choice by William Styron presents one more widely discussed example. In it, a Nazi guard forces Sophie to choose one of her children to be executed, adding that both will be executed if she refuses to choose. This case is different from the other examples in which the conflicting duties are of different types. This type of case has been labeled symmetrical since the two duties have the same type.

== Types ==
Ethical dilemmas come in different types. The distinctions between these types are often important for disagreements about whether there are ethical dilemmas or not. Certain arguments for or against their existence may apply only to some types but not to other types. And only some types, if any, may constitute genuine ethical dilemmas.

=== Epistemic vs ontological ===
In epistemic ethical dilemmas, it is not clear to the agent what should be done because the agent is unable to discern which moral requirement takes precedence. Many decisions in everyday life, from a trivial choice between differently packaged cans of beans in the supermarket to life-altering career-choices, involve this form of uncertainty. But unresolvable conflicts on the epistemic level can exist without there actually being unresolvable conflicts and vice versa.

The main interest in ethical dilemmas is concerned with on the ontological level: whether there actually are genuine dilemmas in the form of unresolvable conflicts between moral requirements, not just whether the agent believes so. The ontological level is also where most of the theoretical disagreements happen since both proponents and opponents of ethical dilemmas usually agree that there are epistemic ethical dilemmas. This distinction is sometimes used to argue against the existence of ethical dilemmas by claiming that all apparent examples are in truth epistemic in nature. In some cases, this can be shown by how the conflict is resolved once the relevant information is obtained. But there may be other cases in which the agent is unable to acquire information that would settle the issue, sometimes referred to as stable epistemic ethical dilemmas.

=== Self-imposed vs world-imposed ===
The difference between self-imposed and world-imposed ethical dilemmas concerns the source of the conflicting requirements. In the self-imposed case, the agent is responsible for the conflict. A common example in this category is making two incompatible promises, for example, to attend two events happening at distant places at the same time. In the world-imposed case, on the other hand, the agent is thrown into the dilemma without being responsible for it occurring. The difference between these two types is relevant for moral theories. Traditionally, most philosophers held that ethical theories should be free from ethical dilemmas, that moral theories that allow or entail the existence of ethical dilemmas are flawed. In the weak sense, this prohibition is only directed at the world-imposed dilemmas. This means that all dilemmas are avoided by agents who strictly follow the moral theory in question. Only agents who diverge from the theory's recommendations may find themselves in ethical dilemmas. But some philosophers have argued that this requirement is too weak, that the moral theory should be able to provide guidance in any situation. This line of thought follows the intuition that it is not relevant how the situation came about for how to respond to it. So e.g. if the agent finds themselves in the self-imposed ethical dilemma of having to choose which promise to break, there should be some considerations why it is right to break one promise rather than the other. Utilitarians, for example, could argue that this depends on which broken promise results in the least harm to all concerned.

=== Obligation vs prohibition ===
An obligation is an ethical requirement to act in a certain way while a prohibition is an ethical requirement to not act in a certain way. Most discussions of ethical dilemmas focus on obligation dilemmas: they involve two conflicting actions that the agent is ethically required to perform. Prohibition dilemmas, on the other hand, are situations in which no course of action is allowed. It has been argued that many arguments against ethical dilemmas are only successful in regard to obligation dilemmas but not against prohibition dilemmas.

=== Single-agent vs multi-agent ===
Ethical dilemmas involve two courses of action that are both obligatory but stand in conflict with each other: it is not possible to perform both actions. In regular single-agent cases, a single agent has both conflicting obligations. In multi-agent cases, the actions are still incompatible but the obligations concern different people. For example, two contestants engaged in a competition may have both the duty to win if that is what they promised to their families. These two obligations belonging to different people are conflicting since there can be only one winner.

=== Other types ===
Ethical dilemmas can be divided according to the types of obligations that are in conflict with each other. For example, Rushworth Kidder suggests that four patterns of conflict can be discerned: "truth versus loyalty, individual versus community, short term versus long term, and justice versus virtue". These cases of conflicts between different types of duties can be contrasted with conflicts in which one type of duty conflicts with itself, for example, if there is a conflict between two long-term obligations. Such cases are often called symmetric cases. The term "problem of dirty hands" refers to another form of ethical dilemmas, which specifically concerns political leaders who find themselves faced with the choice of violating commonly accepted morality in order to bring about some greater overall good.

== Existence of ethical dilemmas ==
The problem of the existence of ethical dilemmas concerns the question of whether there are any genuine ethical dilemmas, as opposed to, for example, merely apparent epistemic dilemmas or resolvable conflicts. The traditional position denies their existence but there are various defenders of their existence in contemporary philosophy. There are various arguments for and against both sides. Defenders of ethical dilemmas often point to apparent examples of dilemmas while their opponents usually aim to show their existence contradicts very fundamental ethical principles. Both sides face the challenge of reconciling these contradictory intuitions.

=== Arguments in favor ===
A common way to argue in favor of ethical dilemmas is to cite concrete examples. Such examples are quite common and can include cases from everyday life, stories, or thought experiments, like Sartre's student or Sophie's Choice discussed in the section on examples. The strength of arguments based on examples rests on the intuition that these cases actually are examples of genuine ethical dilemmas. Opponents of ethical dilemmas often reject this argument based on the claim that the initial intuitions in such cases are misleading. For example, it may turn out that the proposed situation is impossible, that one choice is objectively better than the other or that there is an additional choice that was not mentioned in the description of the example. But for the argument of the defenders to succeed, it is sufficient to have at least one genuine case. This constitutes a considerable difficulty for the opponents since they would have to show that our intuitions are mistaken not just about some of these cases but about all of them. Some opponents have responded to this difficulty by arguing that all these cases merely constitute epistemic but not genuine dilemmas, i.e. that the conflict merely seems unresolvable because of the agent's lack of knowledge. This position is often defended by utilitarians. Support for it comes from the fact that the consequence of even simple actions are often too vast for us to properly anticipate. According to this interpretation, we mistake our uncertainty about which course of action outweighs the other for the idea that this conflict is not resolvable on the ontological level. Defenders of ethical dilemmas usually agree that there are many cases of epistemic dilemmas that are resolvable but seem unresolvable. However, they reject that this claim can be generalized to apply to all examples.

The argument from moral residue is another argument in favor of ethical dilemmas. Moral residue, in this context, refers to backward-looking emotions like guilt or remorse. These emotions are due to the impression of having done something wrong, of having failed to live up to one's obligations. In some cases of moral residue, the agent is responsible herself because she made a bad choice which she regrets afterward. But in the case of an ethical dilemma, this is forced on the agent no matter how she decides. Going through the experience of moral residue is not just something that happens to the agent but it even seems to be the appropriate emotional response. The argument from moral residue uses this line of thought to argue in favor of ethical dilemmas by holding that the existence of ethical dilemmas is the best explanation for why moral residue in these cases is the appropriate response. Opponents can respond by arguing that the appropriate response is not guilt but regret, the difference being that regret is not dependent on the agent's previous choices. By cutting the link to the possibly dilemmatic choice, the initial argument loses its force. Another counter-argument allows that guilt is the appropriate emotional response but denies that this indicates the existence of an underlying ethical dilemma. This line of argument can be made plausible by pointing to other examples, e.g. cases in which guilt is appropriate even though no choice whatsoever was involved.

=== Arguments against ===
Some of the strongest arguments against ethical dilemmas start from very general ethical principles and try to show that these principles are incompatible with the existence of ethical dilemmas, that their existence would therefore involve a contradiction.

One such argument proceeds from the agglomeration principle and the principle that ought implies can. According to the agglomeration principle, if an agent ought to do one thing and ought to do another thing then this agent ought to do both things. According to ought implies can, if an agent ought to do both things then the agent can do both things. But if the agent can do both things, there is no conflict between the two courses of action and therefore no dilemma. It may be necessary for defenders to deny either the agglomeration principle or the principle that ought implies can. Either choice is problematic since these principles are quite fundamental.

Another line of argumentation denies that there are unresolvable ethical conflicts. Such a view may accept that we have various duties, which may conflict with each other at times. But this is not problematic as long as there is always one duty that outweighs the others. It has been proposed that the different types of duties can be ordered into a hierarchy. So in cases of conflict, the higher duty would always take precedent over the lower one, for example, that telling the truth is always more important than keeping a promise. One problem with this approach is that it fails to solve symmetric cases: when two duties of the same type stand in conflict with each other. Another problem for such a position is that the weight of the different types of duties seems to be situation-specific: in some cases of conflict we should tell the truth rather than keep a promise, but in other cases the reverse is true. This is, for example, W. D. Ross's position, according to which we stand under a number of different duties and have to decide on their relative weight based on the specific situation. But without a further argument, this line of thought just begs the question against the defender of ethical dilemmas, who may simply deny the claim that all conflicts can be resolved this way.

A different type of argument proceeds from the nature of moral theories. According to various authors, it is a requirement for good moral theories that they should be action-guiding by being able to recommend what should be done in any situation. But this is not possible when ethical dilemmas are involved. So these intuitions about the nature of good moral theories indirectly support the claim that there are no ethical dilemmas.

== See also ==
- Abortion debate
- Adultery
- Euthanasia
- Execution
- Graded absolutism
- Samaritan's dilemma
- Situational ethics
- Suicide
- The Right and the Good
- Trolley problem
- Value theory
