= Joseph Fletcher (disambiguation) =

Joseph Fletcher was an American ethicist.

Joseph Fletcher may also refer to:

- Joseph Fletcher (historian) (1934–1984), American historian of China and Central Asia
- Joseph Fletcher (minister) (1784–1843), English Congregationalist
- Joseph Fletcher (statistician) (1813–1852), English statistical writer
- Joseph Horner Fletcher (1823–1890), West Indies-born Methodist minister of English descent
- Joseph James Fletcher (1850–1926), Australian biologist
- Joseph M. Fletcher (1831–1882), attorney, civic leader, and government land agent in the Washington Territory
- Joseph O. Fletcher (1920–2008), American Air Force pilot and polar researcher
- J. S. Fletcher (1863–1935), British journalist and crime fiction writer
- Joseph Fletcher (died 1915) (1838–1915), fisherman, friend of poet Edward FitzGerald

== See also ==
- Joe Fletcher
