= Cuisine in the early modern world =

Various cuisines

Cuisine in the early modern world varied through the location and the resources available. There are many factors that play a part into an area's cuisine, with a few being religion, location, and status. Diets across the early modern world varied throughout time and location. The most prominent religions in the early modern era were Islam, Buddhism, and Christianity and each of these religions had their own views on what could be consumed. Trade and status also influenced the diet consumed in a particular region. Trade changed the available resources and allowed for luxury goods to be incorporated into the local region's supply.

== Factors of cuisine ==
Religions, such as Islam, Buddhism, and Christianity, played a factor into the available diet through having specific dietary restraints and regulations. There are some religions, such as the Islamic faith, that specify how certain foods must be consumed or removed from the diet. Other religions have general guidelines as to which foods can be consumed, such as the vegetarian lifestyle that is a basic principle in the Buddhist religion. However, some religions had little to no dietary restrictions, such as the Christian principle of only drinking alcohol in moderate amounts.

Early modern trade was essential to cuisine as various information and goods were traded and developed. Major trading items included food items, silk, fur, and knowledge of trade routes to merchants. One of the most influential trade routes were the fishing routes as they provided a consistent food source as well as held economic power. The spice trade was essential to the trade and development of certain food items and cuisines as well as to providing the connection of trade routes to other continents, specifically the New World.

== Location ==
The geographic region largely determined the type and amount of food that would be available naturally and through trade. Diets also varied depending on climate as each climate created different environments for specific plants and animals to live in, both of which work together to produce diets for that region. One notable difference would be that tropical regions having more natural vegetation incorporated into that region's diet while arctic regions depends on the fishing industry.

Trade also was a large influence in which items were available and able to be traded and thus, spread to other regions. The early modern world saw the expansion of the spice trade through Spanish, Dutch, and Chinese trade routes. Following the established trade routes of the Spice Trade, items that were circulated include pepper, cotton, aromatics, slaves, animals, jewels, clothing, and dyes. In addition to goods being traded, knowledge of food preparation also worked to add to the field of botany.

== Status Differences ==
Status is another factor that played into the available diet and is reflected in the different diets between the peasants and the upper class. The upper class had more wealth and access to various goods and trade opportunities, allowing their diet to include more luxury goods, items that were more expensive and refined. Peasants in the early modern world commonly ate a diet that consisted of "gruels, pottages, and ... grains". Peasants often were farmers, cultivating food items and non-food items, with the most common items being cotton, rice, and sugar cane. The upper class also had access to more techniques and technologies which provided a foundation to the cuisine specific to a certain region or territories. Technology in the early modern period include mills, simple grindstones, food-processing technologies, etc.

== Luxury goods ==
With the expansion of trade, a wider variety of luxury goods were able to be traded and incorporated into the region's diet. Luxury goods were often goods or food items that were not natural to the region and were only available through specific trade routes. The upper class had access to these items and held "banquets [that were] as opulent as possible, with as many rich dishes as possible, larger quantities of food, and extravagant use of spices". The Spice Trade allowed spices as well as currency, like gold, to become less of a luxury as over time they became incorporated as common goods through trade or were consistently available through merchants' supplies.
