= Joe Fletcher =

Joe Fletcher may refer to:

- Joe Fletcher (footballer) (born 1946), British footballer
- Joe Fletcher (referee) (born 1976), Canadian soccer referee

== See also ==
- Jo Fletcher (born 1980), English footballer
- Joseph Fletcher (disambiguation)
