= Early modern period =

Historical period from c. 1500 to c. 1800

- c. 1500 – c. 1800
Late modern period
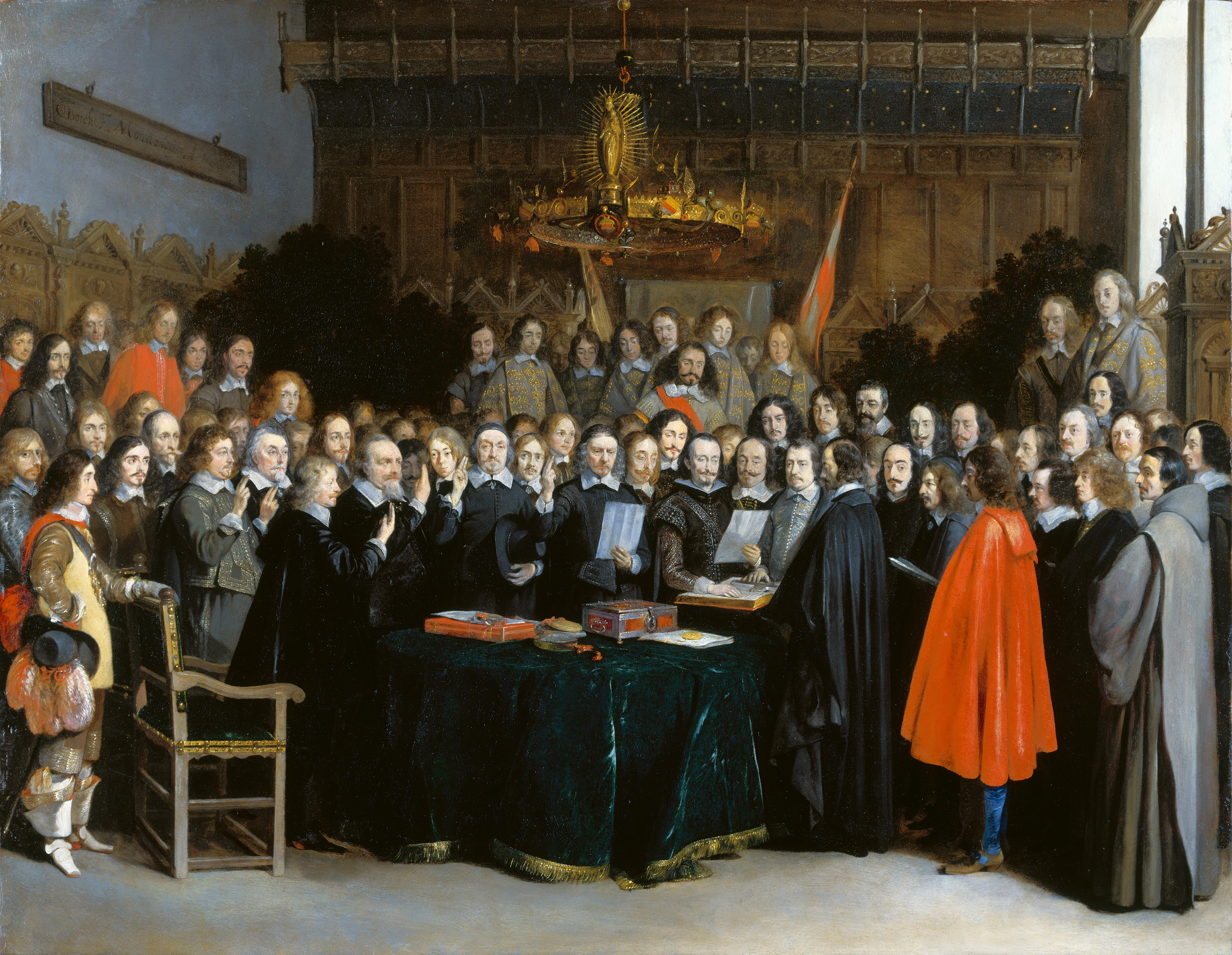
- The Ratification of the Treaty of Münster, establishing the Peace of Westphalia, by painter Gerard ter Borch (1648)
- Location: Worldwide
- Key events: Colonization of the Americas; Protestant Reformation; Rise of Gunpowder Empires; Proto-globalization; Second Hundred Years' War; The Enlightenment

The early modern period, c. 1500 – c. 1800, is a historical period with divisions based primarily on the history of Europe and the broader concept of modernity. There is no exact date that marks the beginning or end of the period, and its extent may vary depending on the area of history being studied. In general, the early modern period is considered to have started at the beginning of the 16th or 17th century (c. 1500 – c. 1600), and it is variably considered to have ended at the 18th or 19th century (1700–1800). In a European context, it is defined as the period following the Middle Ages and preceding the advent of modernity, but there is no universal agreement on the dates of these boundaries. In the context of global history, the early modern period is often used even in contexts where there is no equivalent "medieval" period.

Various events and historical transitions have been proposed as the start of the early modern period, including the start of the Renaissance, the beginning of the printing revolution in the 1440s, the Fall of Constantinople in 1453, the Age of Discovery, or the start of the Reformation. Its transition into the late modern period in the late 18th century was marked by the major developments brought about by the Industrial Revolution, the American Revolution, and the French Revolution (along with Napoleon's rise to power in France), followed by the second wave of modern colonization referred to as New Imperialism.

Historians in recent decades have argued that, from a worldwide standpoint, the most important feature of the early modern period was the spread of globalization. From this viewpoint, the Columbian contact and its newfound notion of a New World being added to the Old World is another marker of the start of the period. New economies and institutions emerged, becoming more sophisticated and globally articulated over the course of the period. The early modern period also included the rise of the dominance of mercantilism as an economic theory. Other notable developments of the period include the Scientific Revolution, increasingly rapid technological progress, secularized civic politics, accelerated travel due to improvements in mapping and ship design, and the strengthening of the administrative structures of monarchies and states in the process of formation.

== History of the concept ==
The concept of the early modern period originated in the study of European history, which since the time of Petrarch and other Renaissance humanists has traditionally been divided into three periods: ancient, medieval, and modern. The term early modern was occasionally used by historians in the early 20th century (the first known usage dates to 1895), but the vast majority of these instances use the term merely to refer to the early centuries of the modern period, not to denote a distinct period with defining features. The term early modern was first proposed to denote a distinct period of European history by medieval historian Lynn Thorndike. In his 1926 work A Short History of Civilization, Thorndike proposed the periodization as a broader alternative to the Renaissance. It was first picked up within the field of economic history during the 1940s and 1950s and gradually spread to other historians in the following decades and became widely known among scholars during the 1990s. It was more popular among historians in North America than in Europe, where, according to Jerry H. Bentley, "Strong traditions of national historiography discouraged […] scholars from efforts to explore a larger European past".

The first attempts to apply the periodization beyond Europe in a substantive manner came by the 1980s. Some scholars used the term while studying Asian societies (such as Tokugawa Japan) that underwent developments similar or comparable to those in early modern Europe. Others argued that early modern Eurasia was distinguished by interconnections and common experiences, including territorial consolidation, demographic growth, inflation, and social mobility, among others. Joseph R. Fletcher, a historian of Central Asia and China, argued in 1985 that early modern Eurasian societies were all affected by "some of the same, interrelated, or at least similar demographic, economic, and even social forces", which included the rise of urban commercial classes, religious reform and revival movements, rural unrest, and the decline of nomadism. Fletcher also suggested the possibility of the periodization's applicability on a global scale. Another group of scholars has made the case for the early modern period as a recognizable era of world history, citing various processes that affected the entire world. Bentley has defined the early modern world as "the era about 1500 to 1800, when cross-cultural interactions increasingly linked the fates and fortunes of peoples throughout the world, but before national states, mechanized industry, and industrial-strength imperialism decisively changed the dynamics governing the development of world history." In Bentley's view, the early modern period should be defined mainly by the processes that intensified interaction and exchange between different parts of the world, producing varying impacts in different regions. He identifies the connection of the world by sea, global biological exchanges, and the creation of an "early capitalist global economy" as the three main processes that spurred the creation of the early modern world and led to other major developments that affected people around the world.

== Overview ==
At the onset of the early modern period, trends in various regions of the world represented a shift away from medieval modes of organization, politically and economically. Feudalism declined in Europe, and Christendom saw the end of the Crusades and of religious unity in Western Europe under the Roman Catholic Church. The old order was destabilized by the Protestant Reformation, which caused a backlash that expanded the Inquisition and sparked the disastrous European wars of religion, which included the especially bloody Thirty Years' War and ended with the establishment of the modern international system in the Peace of Westphalia. Along with the European colonization of the Americas, this period also contained the Commercial Revolution, the Scientific Revolution, and the Golden Age of Piracy. The globalization of the period can be seen in the medieval North Italian city-states and maritime republics, particularly Genoa, Venice, and Milan. Russia reached the Pacific coast in 1647 and consolidated its control over the Russian Far East in the 19th century. The Great Divergence took place as Western Europe greatly surpassed China in technology and per capita wealth.

In the context of the so-called Age of Revolutions, beginning with revolts in America and France, political changes were then pushed forward in other countries. This was partly as a result of the upheavals of the Napoleonic Wars and their impact on the world of ideas and thought of the time: concepts from nationalism to organizing armies were attracting attention and debate. The early modern period ended in a time of economic and political change, as a result of mechanization in society, the American Revolution, and the first French Revolution; other factors included the redrawing of the map of Europe by the Final Act of the Congress of Vienna and the peace established by the Second Treaty of Paris, which ended the Napoleonic Wars.

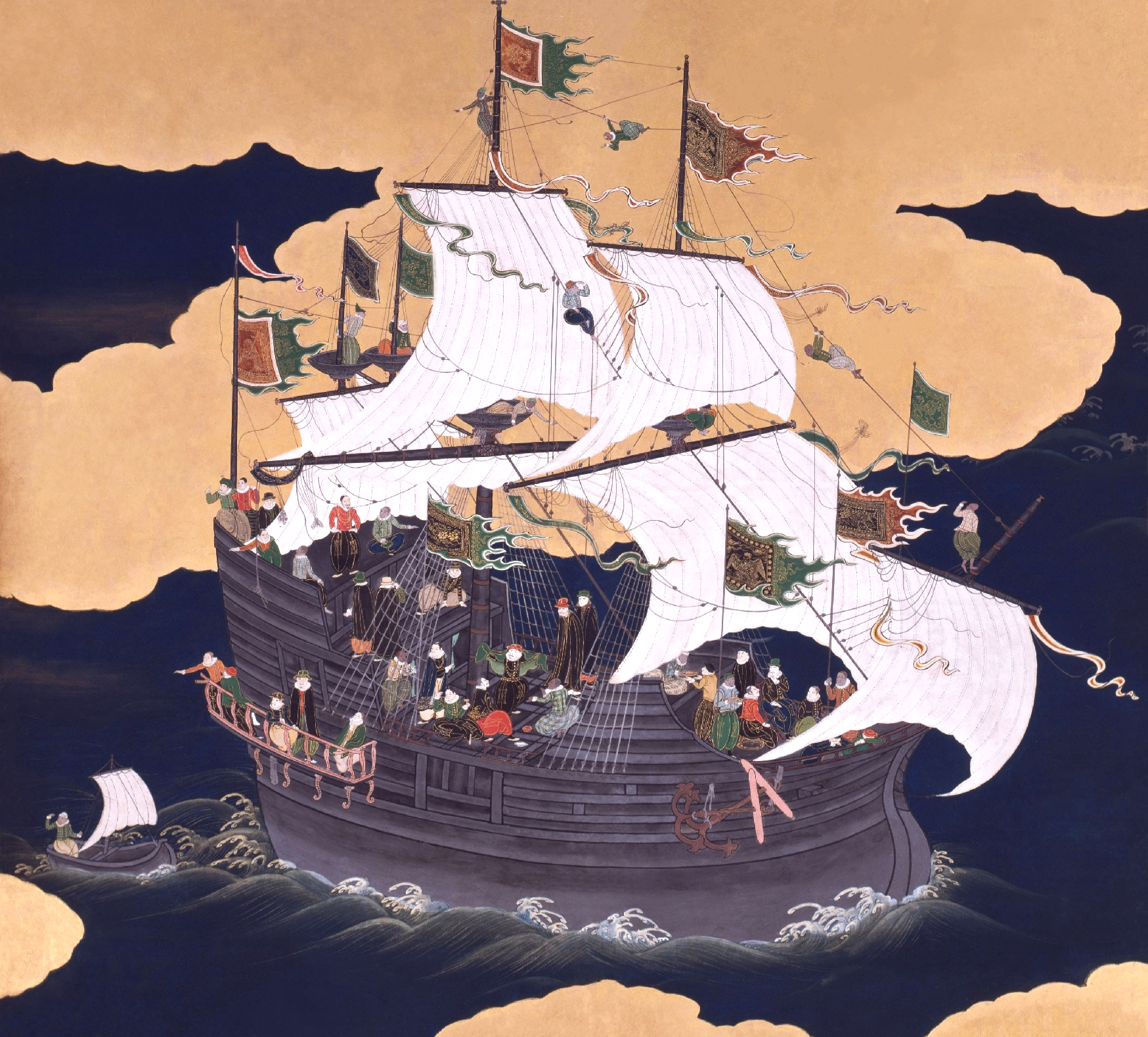
A Japanese depiction of a Portuguese trading carrack. Advances in shipbuilding technology during the Late Middle Ages would pave the way for the global European presence characteristic of the early modern period.

In the Americas, pre-Columbian peoples had built a large and varied civilization, including the Aztec Empire, the Inca civilization, the Maya civilization and its cities, and the Muisca. The European colonization of the Americas began during the early modern period, as did the establishment of European trading hubs in Asia and Africa, which contributed to the spread of Christianity around the world. The rise of sustained contacts between previously isolated parts of the globe, in particular the Columbian Exchange that linked the Old World and the New World, greatly altered the human environment. Notably, the Atlantic slave trade and colonization of Indigenous peoples of the Americas began during this period. The Ottoman Empire conquered Southeastern Europe, and parts of West Asia and North Africa.

Following the fragmentation of the Timurid Empire, the Ottoman, Safavid, and Mughal empires—traditionally known as the Gunpowder Empires—consolidated their power across the Islamic world. Although the use of firearms and artillery was decisive for their territorial expansion and military capabilities, their strength also rested on the construction of centralized states, efficient bureaucracies, tax collection systems, control over strategic trade routes, and the administration of ethnically and religiously diverse societies. Thus, these empires distinguished themselves not only through military might but also through their political, economic, and cultural development. The Suri Empire, despite employing similar military technologies and playing a significant role in the history of northern India, is not generally classified as one of the Gunpowder Empires. Particularly in the Indian subcontinent, Mughal architecture, culture, and art reached their zenith, while the empire itself is believed to have had the world's largest economy, bigger than the entirety of Western Europe and worth 25% of global GDP. By the mid-18th century, India was a major proto-industrializing region.

Various Chinese dynasties controlled the East Asian sphere. In Japan, the Edo period from 1600 to 1868 is also referred to as the early modern period. In Korea, the early modern period is considered to have lasted from the rise of the Joseon dynasty to the enthronement of King Gojong. By the 16th century, Asian economies under the Ming dynasty and Mughal Bengal were stimulated by trade with the Portuguese, the Spanish, and the Dutch, while Japan engaged in the Nanban trade after the arrival of the first European Portuguese during the Azuchi–Momoyama period.

Meanwhile, in Southeast Asia, the Toungoo Empire along with Ayutthaya experienced a golden age and ruled a large extent of Mainland Southeast Asia, with the Nguyen and Trinh lords de facto ruling the south and north of present-day Vietnam respectively, whereas the Mataram Sultanate was the dominant power in Maritime Southeast Asia. The early modern period experienced an influx of European traders and missionaries into the region.

== Asia and Africa ==
=== East Asia ===
In early modern times, the major nations of East Asia attempted to pursue a course of isolationism from the outside world, but this policy was not always enforced uniformly or successfully. However, by the end of the early modern period, China, Korea, and Japan were mostly closed and uninterested in Europeans, even while trading relationships grew in port cities such as Guangzhou and Dejima.

==== Chinese dynasties ====
Around the beginning of the ethnically Han Ming dynasty (1368–1644), China was leading the world in mathematics as well as science. However, Europe soon caught up to China's scientific and mathematical achievements and surpassed them. Many scholars have speculated about the reason behind China's lag in advancement. A historian named Colin Ronan claims that though there is no one specific answer, there must be a connection between China's urgency for discoveries being weaker than Europe's and China's inability to capitalize on its early advantages. Ronan believes that China's Confucian bureaucracy and traditions led to China not having a scientific revolution, which led China to have fewer scientists to break the existing orthodoxies, like Galileo Galilei. Despite inventing gunpowder in the 9th century, it was in Europe that the classic handheld firearms, matchlocks, were invented, with evidence of use around the 1480s. China was using the matchlocks by 1540, after the Portuguese brought their matchlocks to Japan in the early 1500s. During the Ming dynasty, China established a bureau to maintain its calendar. The bureau was necessary because the calendars were linked to celestial phenomena and needed regular maintenance because twelve lunar months have 344 or 355 days, so occasional leap months have to be added in order to maintain 365 days per year.

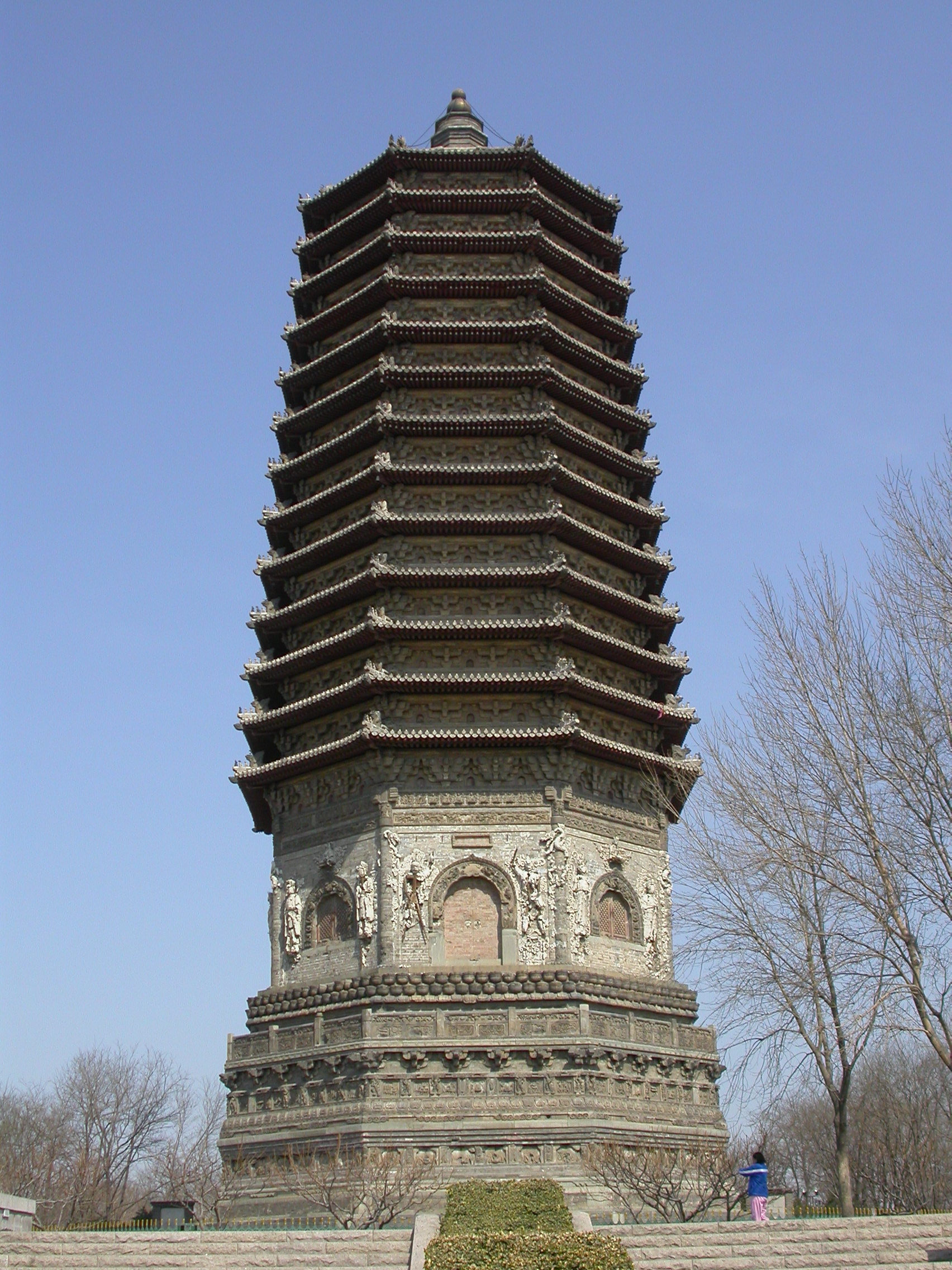
Cishou Temple Pagoda, built in 1576: the Chinese believed that building pagodas on certain sites according to geomantic principles brought about auspicious events; merchant-funding for such projects was needed by the late Ming period.

In the early Ming dynasty, urbanization increased as the population grew and as the division of labor grew more complex. Large urban centers, such as Nanjing and Beijing, also contributed to the growth of private industry. In particular, small-scale industries grew, often specializing in paper, silk, cotton, and porcelain goods. For the most part, however, relatively small urban centers with markets proliferated around the country. Town markets mainly traded food, with some necessary manufactures such as pins or oil. In the 16th century, the Ming dynasty flourished in maritime trade with the Portuguese, Spanish, and Dutch Empires. The trade brought in a massive amount of silver, which China at the time needed desperately. Prior to China's global trade, its economy ran on paper money. However, in the 14th century, China's paper money system suffered a crisis, and by the mid-15th century, it crashed. The silver imports helped fill the void left by the broken paper money system, which helps explain why the value of silver in China was twice as high as the value of silver in Spain at the end of the 16th century.

China under the later Ming dynasty became isolated, prohibiting the construction of ocean-going sea vessels. Despite isolationist policies, the Ming economy still suffered from inflation due to an overabundance of Spanish New World silver entering its economy through new European colonies such as Macau. Ming China was further strained by victorious but costly wars to protect Korea from Japanese invasion. The European trade depression of the 1620s also hurt the Chinese economy, which sank to the point where all of China's trading partners cut ties with it: Philip IV restricted shipments of exports from Acapulco, the Japanese cut off all trade with Macau, and the Dutch severed connections between Goa and Macau.

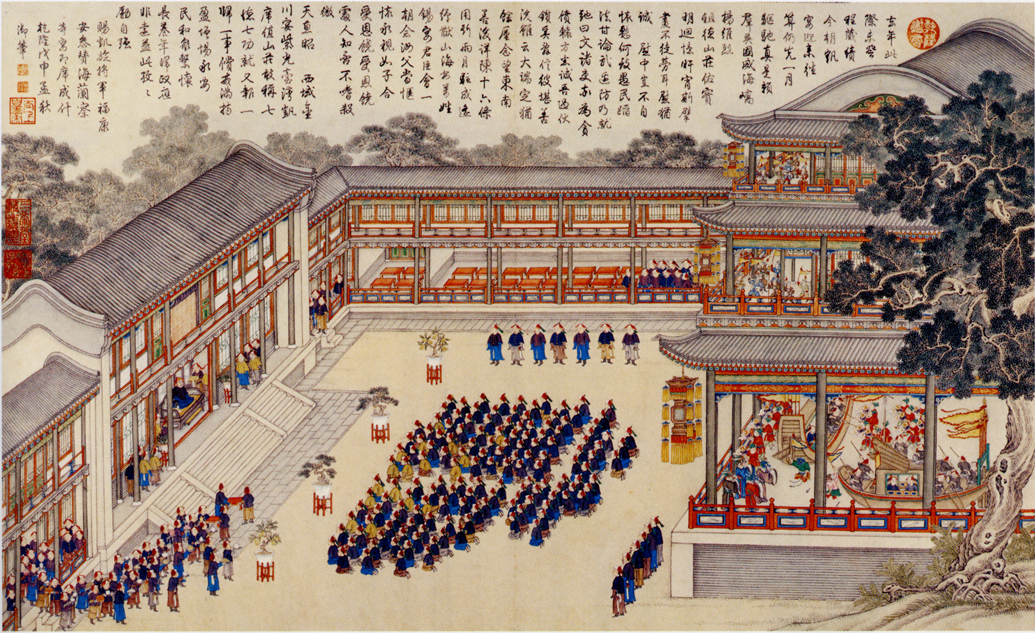
Painting depicting the Qing Chinese celebrating a victory over the Kingdom of Tungning in Taiwan. This work was a collaboration between Chinese and European painters.

The damage to the economy was compounded by the effects on agriculture of the incipient Little Ice Age, natural calamities, crop failure, and sudden epidemics. The ensuing breakdown of authority and people's livelihoods allowed rebel leaders, such as Li Zicheng, to challenge Ming authority.

The Ming dynasty fell around 1644 to the ethnically Manchu Qing dynasty, which would be the last dynasty of China. The Qing ruled from 1644 to 1912, with a brief, abortive restoration in 1917. During its reign, the Qing dynasty adopted many of the outward features of Chinese culture in establishing its rule, but did not necessarily "assimilate"; instead, it adopted a more universalist style of governance. The Manchus were formerly known as the Jurchens. When Beijing was captured by Li Zicheng's peasant rebels in 1644, the Chongzhen Emperor, the last Ming emperor, committed suicide. The Manchus then allied with former Ming general Wu Sangui and seized control of Beijing, which became the new capital of the Qing dynasty. The Manchus adopted the Confucian norms of traditional Chinese government in their rule of China proper. Schoppa, the editor of The Columbia Guide to Modern Chinese History, argues:

A date around 1780 as the beginning of modern China is thus closer to what we know today as historical 'reality'. It also allows us to have a better baseline to understand the precipitous decline of the Chinese polity in the nineteenth and twentieth centuries.

==== Japanese shogunates ====
The Sengoku period that began around 1467 and lasted around a century consisted of several continually "warring states".

Following contact with the Portuguese on Tanegashima Isle in 1543, the Japanese adopted several of the technologies and cultural practices of their visitors, whether in the military area (the arquebus, European-style cuirasses, European ships), religion (Christianity), decorative art, language (integration into Japanese of a Western vocabulary), or culinary (the Portuguese introduced tempura and valuable refined sugar).

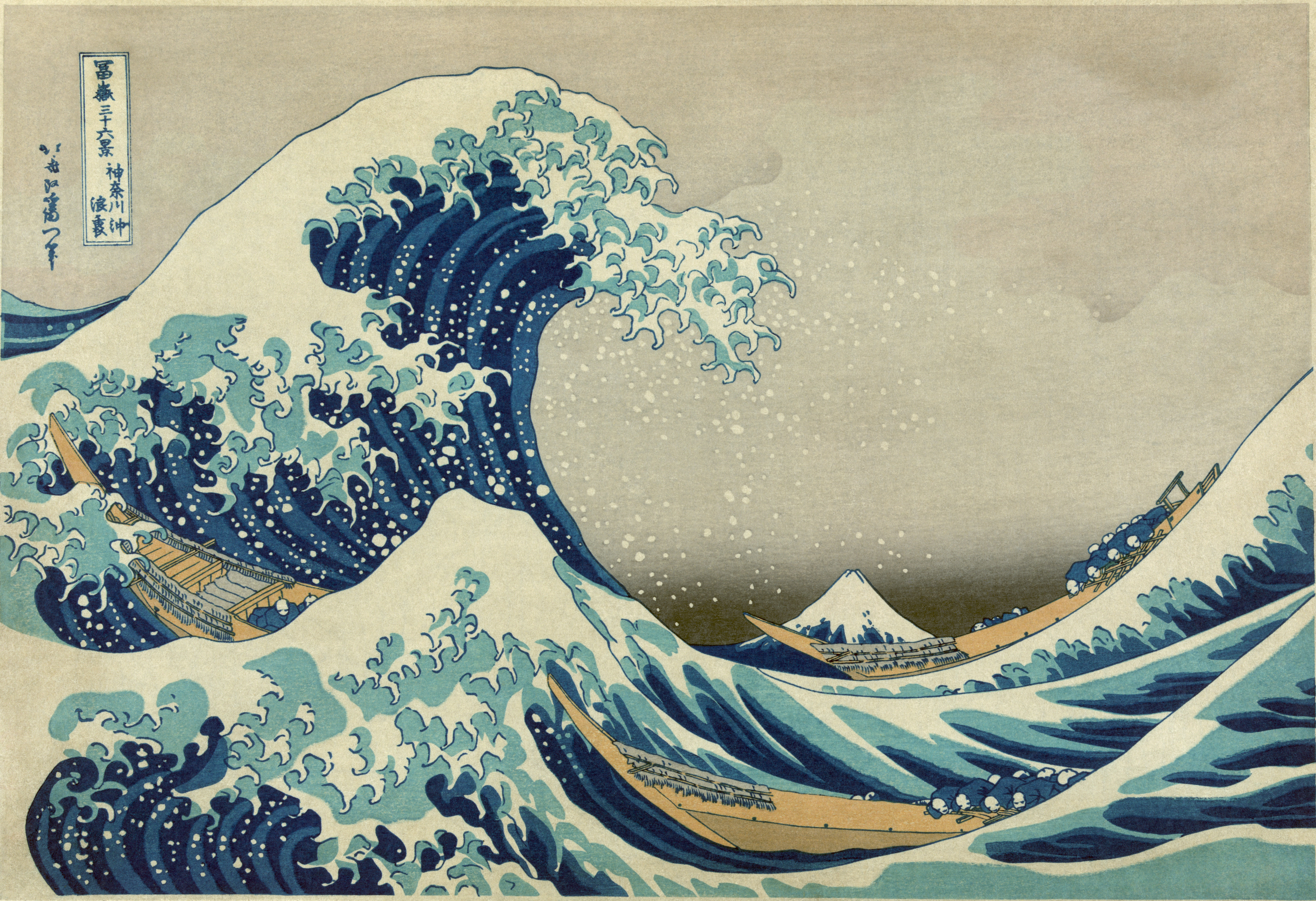
The Great Wave off Kanagawa, c. 1830 by Hokusai, an example of art flourishing in the Edo period

Central government was largely reestablished by Oda Nobunaga and Toyotomi Hideyoshi during the Azuchi–Momoyama period. Although a start date of 1573 is often given, in broader terms, the period begins with Oda Nobunaga's entry into Kyoto in 1568, when he led his army to the imperial capital in order to install Ashikaga Yoshiaki as the 15th, and ultimately final, shōgun of the Ashikaga shogunate, and it lasts until the coming to power of Tokugawa Ieyasu after his victory over supporters of the Toyotomi clan at the Battle of Sekigahara in 1600. Tokugawa received the title of shōgun in 1603, establishing the Tokugawa shogunate.

The Edo period from 1600 to 1868 characterized early modern Japan. The Tokugawa shogunate was a feudal regime of Japan established by Tokugawa Ieyasu and ruled by the shōguns of the Tokugawa clan. The period gets its name from the capital city, Edo, now called Tokyo. The Tokugawa shogunate ruled from Edo Castle from 1603 until 1868, when it was abolished during the Meiji Restoration in the late Edo period (often called the Late Tokugawa shogunate).

Society in the Japanese "Tokugawa period" (Edo society), unlike the shogunates before it, was based on the strict class hierarchy originally established by Toyotomi Hideyoshi. The daimyōs (feudal lords) were at the top, followed by the warrior caste of samurai, with the farmers, artisans, and traders ranking below. The country was strictly closed to foreigners with few exceptions under the Sakoku policy. Literacy among the Japanese people rose in the two centuries of isolation.

In some parts of the country, particularly smaller regions, daimyōs and samurai were more or less identical, since daimyōs might be trained as samurai, and samurai might act as local lords. Otherwise, the largely inflexible nature of this social stratification system unleashed disruptive forces over time. Taxes on the peasantry were set at fixed amounts which did not account for inflation or other changes in monetary value. As a result, the tax revenues collected by the samurai landowners were worth less and less over time. This often led to numerous confrontations between noble but impoverished samurai and well-to-do peasants. None, however, proved compelling enough to seriously challenge the established order until the arrival of foreign powers.

==== Korean dynasty ====
In 1392, General Yi Seong-gye established the Joseon dynasty (1392–1910) with a largely bloodless coup. Yi Seong-gye moved the capital of Korea to the location of modern-day Seoul. The dynasty was heavily influenced by Confucianism, which also played a large role in shaping Korea's strong cultural identity. King Sejong the Great (1418–1450), one of the only two kings in Korea's history to earn the title of great in their posthumous titles, reclaimed Korean territory to the north and created the Korean alphabet.

During the end of the 16th century, Korea was invaded twice by Japan, first in 1592 and again in 1597. Japan failed both times due to Admiral Yi Sun-sin, Korea's revered naval genius, who led the Korean Navy using advanced metal-clad ships called turtle ships. Because the ships were armed with cannons, Admiral Yi's navy was able to demolish the Japanese invading fleets, destroying hundreds of ships in Japan's second invasion. During the 17th century, Korea was invaded again, this time by Manchurians, who would later take over China as the Qing dynasty. In 1637, King Injo was forced to surrender to the Qing forces, and he was ordered to send princesses as concubines to the Qing Prince Dorgon.

=== South Asia ===
==== Indian empires ====
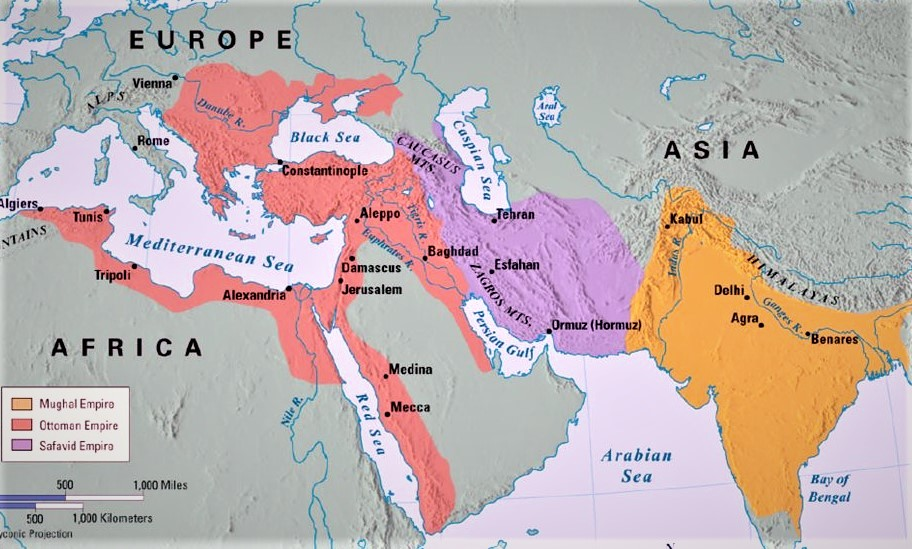
Map of the Gunpowder Empires, with the Mughal Empire in orange

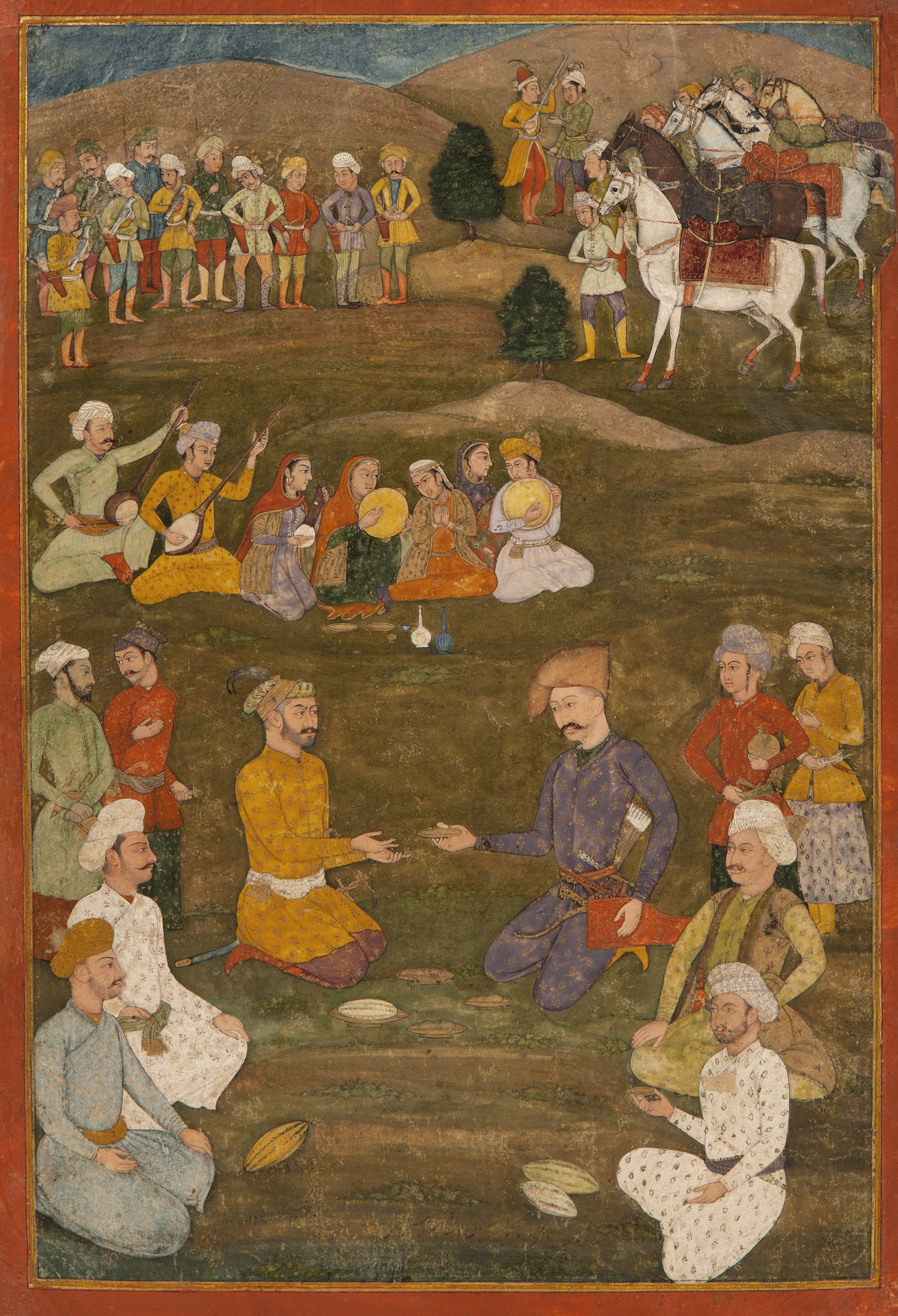
The Mughal ambassador Khan'Alam in 1618 negotiating with Shah Abbas the Great of Iran

The rise of the Mughal Empire is usually dated from 1526, around the end of the Middle Ages. It was an Islamic Persianate imperial power that ruled most of the area as Hindustan by the late 17th and early 18th centuries. The empire dominated South Asia, becoming the largest global economy and manufacturing power, with a nominal GDP valued at a quarter of the global economy, superior to the combined GDP of Europe. The empire, prior to the death of the last prominent emperor Aurangzeb, was marked by a highly centralized administration connecting its different provinces. All the significant monuments of the Mughals—their most visible legacy—date to this period, which was characterized by the expansion of Persian cultural influence in the Indian subcontinent, with brilliant literary, artistic, and architectural results. The Maratha Confederacy, founded in the southwest of present-day India, surpassed the Mughals as the dominant power in India from 1740 and rapidly expanded until the Third Battle of Panipat halted their expansion in 1761.

==== British and Dutch colonization ====
The development of New Imperialism saw the conquest of nearly all eastern hemisphere territories by colonial powers. The commercial colonization of India commenced in 1757, after the Battle of Plassey, when the Nawab of Bengal surrendered his dominions to the British East India Company, in 1765, when the company was granted the diwani, or the right to collect revenue, in Bengal and Bihar, or in 1772, when the company established a capital in Calcutta, appointed its first Governor-General, Warren Hastings, and became directly involved in governance.

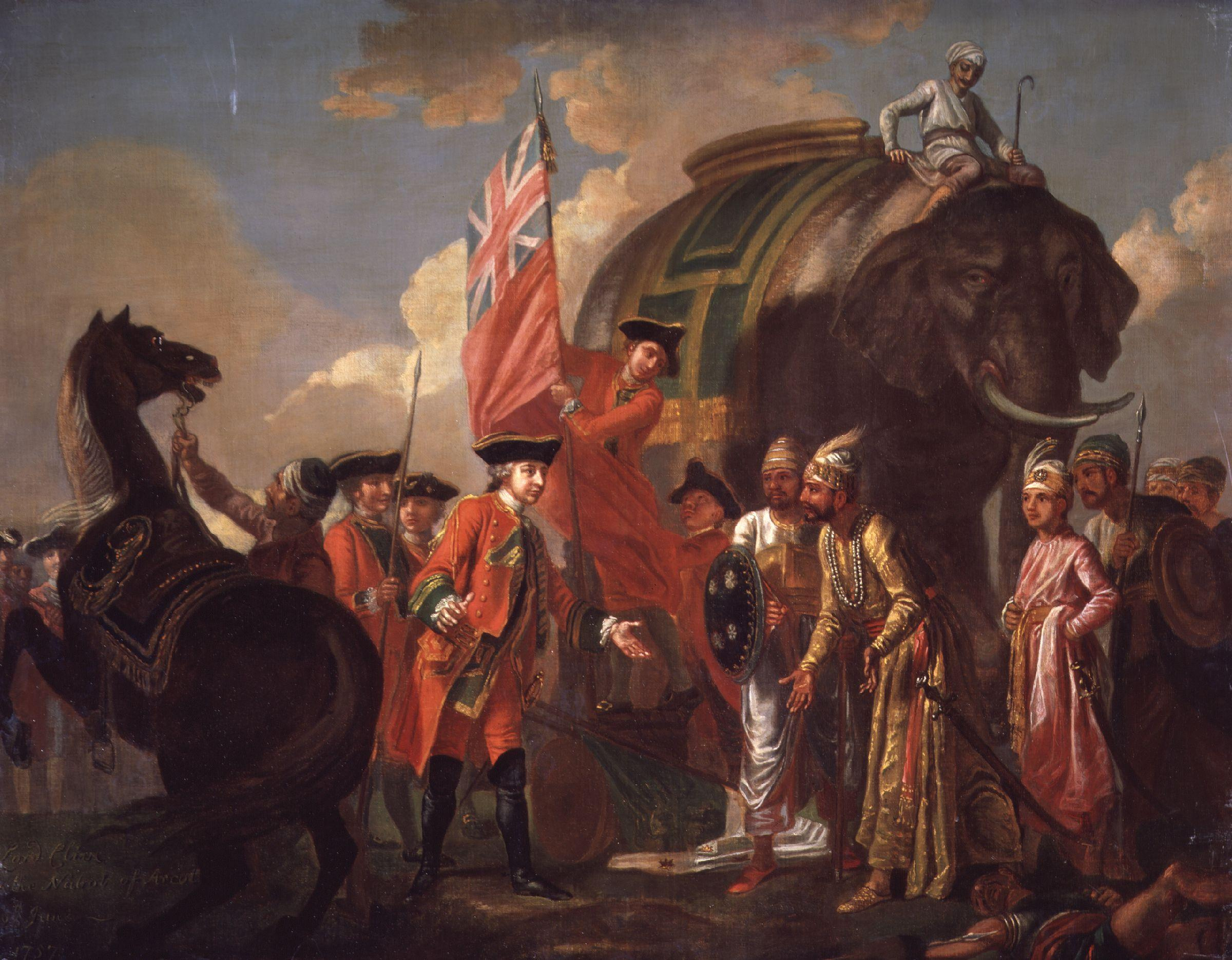
Robert Clive and Mir Jafar after the Battle of Plassey, 1757, by Francis Hayman

The Maratha Confederacy, following the Anglo-Maratha wars, eventually lost to the British East India Company in 1818 with the Third Anglo-Maratha War. Rule by the Company lasted until 1858, when, after the Indian rebellion of 1857 and following the Government of India Act 1858, the British government assumed the task of directly administering India in the new British Raj. In 1819, Stamford Raffles established Singapore as a key trading post for Britain in its rivalry with the Dutch. However, the rivalry cooled in 1824 when an Anglo-Dutch treaty demarcated their respective interests in Southeast Asia. From the 1850s onward, the pace of colonization shifted to a significantly higher gear.

=== Southeast Asia ===
At the start of the modern era, the Spice Route between India and China crossed Majapahit, an archipelagic empire based on the island of Java. It was the last of the major Hindu empires of Maritime Southeast Asia and is considered one of the greatest states in Indonesian history. Its influence extended to Sumatra, the Malay Peninsula, Borneo, and eastern Indonesia, though the effectiveness of this influence remains debated. Majapahit struggled to control the rising Sultanate of Malacca, which dominated Muslim Malay settlements in Phuket, Satun, Pattani, and Sumatra. The Portuguese invaded Malacca's capital in 1511, and by 1528, the Sultanate of Johor was established by a Malaccan prince to succeed Malacca. While in Borneo, Brunei began its golden age during the reign of Sultan Bolkiah, when he defeated the Kingdom of Tondo in the Tondo War; however, it was paused when the sultanate fought the Spanish in the Castilian War in 1578. It was later restarted during the reign of Sultan Muhammad Hassan; later, in 1660, Brunei's first civil war started, and in the aftermath of said war, Brunei's golden age was paused once again until the reign of Omar Ali Saifuddien I and the sultans that came after him defeated the Sulu in the Lanun War in 1790.

=== West Asia and North Africa ===
==== Ottoman Empire ====
Ottoman Empire 1481–1683

During the early modern era, the Ottoman Empire enjoyed an expansion and consolidation of power, leading to a Pax Ottomana. This was perhaps the golden age of the empire. The Ottomans expanded southwest into North Africa while battling with the re-emergent Persian Shi'a Safavid Empire to the east.

==== North Africa ====
In the Ottoman sphere, the Turks seized Egypt in 1517 and established the regencies of Algeria, Tunisia, and Tripolitania (between 1519 and 1551), Morocco remaining an independent Arabized Berber state under the Sharifan dynasty.

==== Safavid Iran ====
The Safavid Empire was a great Shia Persianate empire after the Islamic conquest of Persia and the establishment of Islam, marking an important point in the history of Islam in the east. The Safavid dynasty was founded around 1501. From their base in Ardabil, the Safavids established control over all of Persia and reasserted the Iranian identity of the region, thus becoming the first native dynasty since the Sassanids to establish a unified Iranian state. Problematic for the Safavids was the powerful Ottoman Empire. The Ottomans, a Sunni dynasty, fought several campaigns against the Safavids.

What fueled the growth of the Safavid economy was its position between the burgeoning civilizations of Europe to its west and Islamic Central Asia to its east and north. The Silk Road, which led from Europe to East Asia, revived in the 16th century. Leaders also supported direct sea trade with Europe, particularly England and the Netherlands, which sought Persian carpet, silk, and textiles. Other exports were horses, goat hair, pearls, and an inedible bitter almond (hadam-talka) used as a spice in India. The main imports were spices, textiles (woolens from Europe, cotton from Gujarat), metals, coffee, and sugar. Despite their demise in 1722, the Safavids left their mark by establishing and spreading Shi'a Islam in major parts of the Caucasus and West Asia.

==== Uzbeks and Afghan Pashtuns ====
In the 16th to early 18th centuries, Central Asia was under the rule of Uzbeks, and the far eastern portions were ruled by the local Pashtuns. Between the 15th and 16th centuries, various nomadic tribes arrived from the steppes, including the Kipchaks, Naimans, Kangly, Khongirad, and Manghuds. These groups were led by Muhammad Shaybani, who was the Khan of the Uzbeks.

The lineage of the Afghan Pashtuns stretches back to the Hotaki dynasty. Following Muslim Arab and Turkic conquests, Pashtun ghazis (warriors for the faith) invaded and conquered much of northern India during the Lodhi dynasty and Suri dynasty. Pashtun forces also invaded Persia, and the opposing forces were defeated in the Battle of Gulnabad. The Pashtuns later formed the Durrani Empire.

=== Sub-Saharan Africa ===
The Songhai Empire took control of the trans-Saharan trade at the beginning of the modern era. It seized Timbuktu in 1468 and Jenne in 1473, building the regime on trade revenues and the cooperation of Muslim merchants. The empire eventually made Islam the official religion, built mosques, and brought Muslim scholars to Gao.

== Europe ==
Many major events caused Europe to change around the start of the 16th century, starting with the Fall of Constantinople in 1453, the fall of Muslim Spain and the discovery of the Americas in 1492, and Martin Luther's Protestant Reformation in 1517. In England, the modern period is often dated to the start of the Tudor period with the victory of Henry VII over Richard III at the Battle of Bosworth in 1485. Early modern European history is usually seen to span from the start of the 15th century, through the Age of Enlightenment in the 17th and 18th centuries, until the beginning of the Industrial Revolution in the late 18th century.

The early modern period is taken to end with the French Revolution, the Napoleonic Wars, and the Dissolution of the Holy Roman Empire at the Congress of Vienna. At the end of the early modern period, the British and Russian empires had emerged as world powers from the multipolar contest of colonial empires, while the three great Asian empires of the early modern period, Ottoman Turkey, Mughal India and Qing China, all entered a period of stagnation or decline.

=== Gunpowder and firearms ===
When gunpowder was introduced to Europe, it was immediately used almost exclusively in weapons and explosives for warfare. Though it was invented in China, gunpowder arrived in Europe already formulated for military use; European countries took advantage of this and were the first to create the classic firearms. The advances made in gunpowder and firearms were directly tied to the decline in the use of plate armor because of the inability of the armor to protect one from bullets. The musket was able to penetrate all forms of armor available at the time, making armor obsolete, and as a consequence, the heavy musket as well. Although there is relatively little to no difference in design between arquebus and musket except in size and strength, it was the term musket which remained in use up into the 1800s.

=== European kingdoms and movements ===
In the early modern period, the Holy Roman Empire was a union of territories in Central Europe under a Holy Roman Emperor, the first of whom was Otto I. The last was Francis II, who abdicated and dissolved the Empire in 1806 during the Napoleonic Wars. Despite its name, for much of its history the Empire did not include Rome within its borders.

The Renaissance was a cultural movement that began in the 14th century, beginning in Italy in the Late Middle Ages and later spreading to the rest of Europe. The term is also used more loosely to refer to the historic era, but since the changes of the Renaissance were not uniform across Europe, this is a general use of the term. As a cultural movement, it encompassed a rebellion of learning based on classical sources, the development of linear perspective in painting, and gradual but widespread educational reform.

==== Notable individuals ====
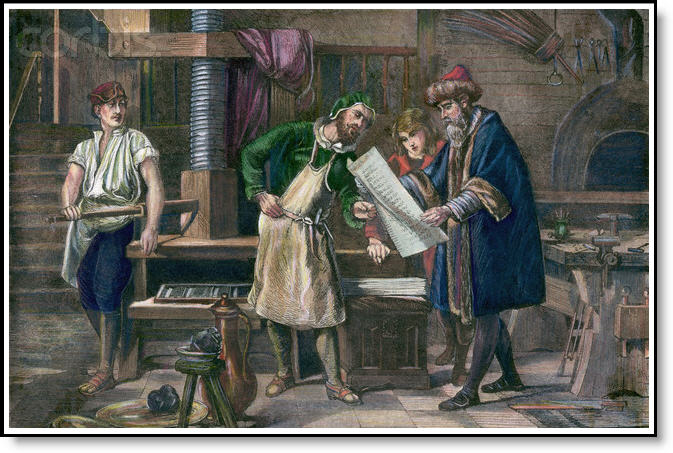
Gutenberg reviewing a press proof (a colored engraving created probably in the 19th century)

Johannes Gutenberg is credited as the first European to use movable type printing, around 1439, and as the global inventor of the mechanical printing press. Nicolaus Copernicus formulated a comprehensive heliocentric cosmology (1543), which displaced the Earth from the center of the universe. His book, De revolutionibus orbium coelestium (On the Revolutions of the Celestial Spheres), began modern astronomy and sparked the Scientific Revolution. Another notable individual was Machiavelli, an Italian political philosopher, considered a founder of modern political science. Machiavelli is most famous for a short political treatise, The Prince, a work of realist political theory. The Swiss Paracelsus (1493–1541) is associated with a medical revolution, while the Anglo-Irish Robert Boyle was one of the founders of modern chemistry. In visual arts, notable representatives included the "three giants of the High Renaissance", namely Leonardo da Vinci, Michelangelo, and Raphael, Albrecht Dürer (often considered the greatest artist of the Northern Renaissance), Titian from the Venetian school, Peter Paul Rubens of the Flemish Baroque traditions. Famous composers included Guillaume Du Fay, Heinrich Isaac, Josquin des Prez, Giovanni Pierluigi da Palestrina, Claudio Monteverdi, and Jean-Baptiste Lully.

Among the notable royalty of the time was Charles the Bold (1433–1477), the last Valois Duke of Burgundy, known as Charles the Bold (or Rash) to his enemies. His early death was a pivotal moment in European history. Charles has often been regarded as the last representative of the feudal spirit, although in administrative affairs, he introduced remarkable modernizing innovations. Upon his death, Charles left an unmarried nineteen-year-old daughter, Mary of Burgundy, as his heir. Her marriage would have enormous implications for the political balance of Europe. Frederick III, Holy Roman Emperor, secured the match for his son, the future Maximilian I, Holy Roman Emperor, with the aid of Mary's stepmother, Margaret. In 1477, the territory of the Duchy of Burgundy was annexed by France. In the same year, Mary married Maximilian, Archduke of Austria. A conflict between the Burgundian side (Maximilian brought with himself almost no resources from the Empire) and France ensued, culminating in the Treaty of Senlis (1493), which gave the majority of the Burgundian inheritance to the Habsburgs (Mary had already died in 1482). The rise of the Habsburg dynasty was a prime factor in the spreading of the Renaissance.

In Central Europe, King Matthias Corvinus (1443–1490), a notable nation builder, conqueror (Hungary in his time was the most powerful in Central Europe) and patron, was the first to introduce the Renaissance outside of Italy. In the military area, he introduced the Black Army, one of the first standing armies in Europe and a remarkably modern force.

Some noblemen from the generation that lived during this period have been attributed the moniker "the last knight", with the most notable being the above-mentioned Maximilian I (1459–1519), Chevalier de Bayard (1476–1524), Franz von Sickingen (1481–1523) and Götz von Berlichingen (1480–1562). Maximilian (although Claude Michaud opines that he could claim "last knight" status by virtue of being the last medieval epic poet) was actually a chief modernizing force of the time (whose reform initiatives led to Europe-wide revolutions in the areas of warfare and communications, among others), who broke the back of the knight class (causing many to become robber barons) and had personal conflicts with the three other men on the matter of the knight's status.

=== Christians and Christendom ===
Johann Sebastian Bach—Mass in B minor—Agnus Dei, from 1724

Christianity was challenged at the beginning of the modern period with the fall of Constantinople in 1453 and later by various movements to reform the church (including Lutheran, Zwinglian, and Calvinist), followed by the Counter Reformation.

==== End of the Crusades and Unity ====
The Hussite Crusades (1419–1434) involved military actions against the followers of Jan Hus in Bohemia, concluding with the Battle of Grotniki. These wars were notable for being among the first European conflicts where hand-held gunpowder weapons, like muskets, played a decisive role. The Taborite faction of Hussite warriors, primarily infantry, decisively defeated larger armies with heavily armored knights, contributing to the infantry revolution. However, the Hussite Crusades were ultimately inconclusive.

Battle of Vienna, 12 September 1683

The final crusade, the Crusade of 1456, was organized to counter the advancing Ottoman Empire and lift the Siege of Belgrade (1456), led by John Hunyadi and Giovanni da Capistrano. The siege culminated in a counterattack that forced Sultan Mehmet II to retreat, with the victory being credited with deciding the fate of Christendom. The noon bell, ordered by Pope Callixtus III, commemorates this victory across the Christian world to this day.

Nearly a century later, the Peace of Augsburg (1555) ended the concept of a united Christian church. The principle of cuius regio, eius religio allowed rulers to determine their state's religion. This framework was solidified by the Treaty of Westphalia (1648), which ended the European Wars of Religion and the notion of a singular Christian hegemony. The treaty also marked the birth of the modern concept of national sovereignty.

==== Inquisitions and Reformations ====
The Inquisition in the modern era refers to several institutions within the Catholic Church tasked with prosecuting heretics and others who violated canon law. The first significant manifestation was the Spanish Inquisition (1478–1834). The Inquisition prosecuted crimes such as sorcery, blasphemy, Judaizing, witchcraft, and censorship of printed literature. Its jurisdiction was limited to baptized Catholics, while non-Christians were typically tried by secular courts.

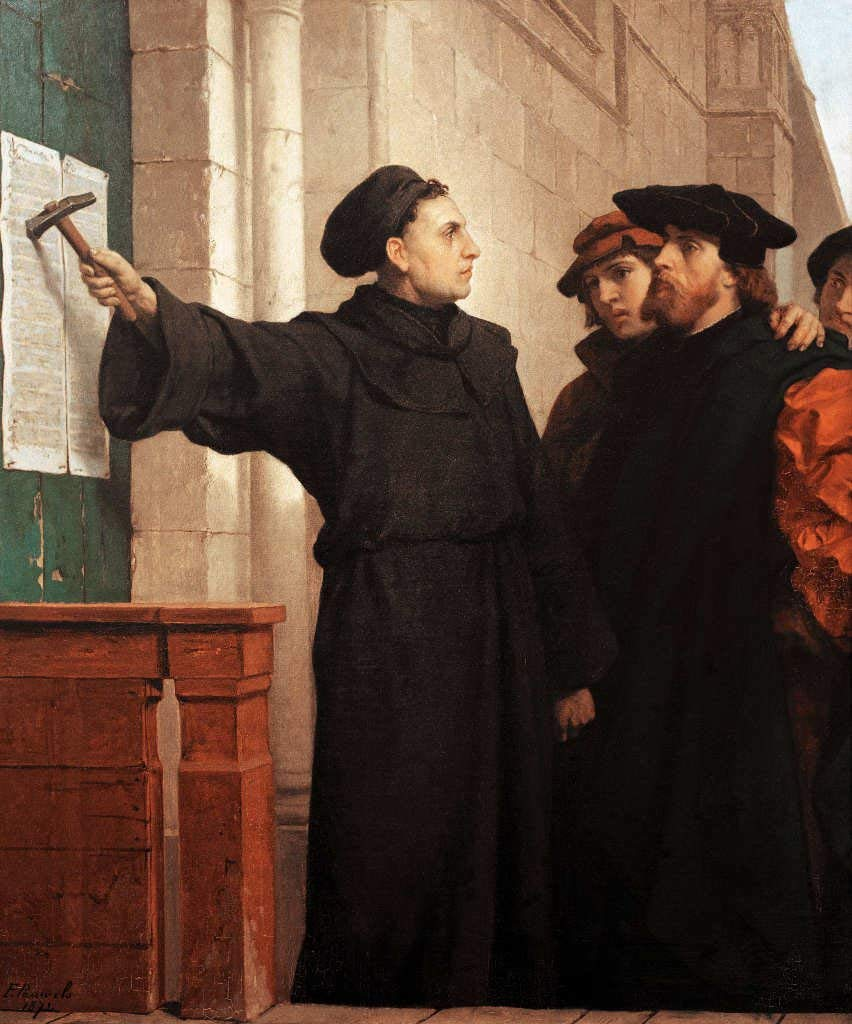
Martin Luther hammers his 95 theses to the door, by Ferdinand Pauwels

The Reformation and rise of modernity in the early 16th century brought changes to Christendom. The Augustinian friar Martin Luther in Germany challenged the Church with his Ninety-five Theses, marking the start of the Reformation. Luther's movement, supported by the Electorate of Saxony, developed at the University of Wittenberg, where he became a professor.

Luther's 95 Theses criticized practices like the sale of indulgences and sparked debates, leading to the rise of rival Protestant denominations, such as Lutheranism and the Reformed tradition. In England, the movement became known as the English Reformation, resulting in the formation of Anglicanism.

The Diet of Worms (1521) declared Luther a heretic, but Emperor Charles V was preoccupied with external threats and allowed German princes to decide whether to enforce the Edict of Worms. The religious conflict escalated, leading to the formation of the Schmalkaldic League to defend Protestant interests. This culminated in the Peace of Augsburg (1555), which established the principle of cuius regio, eius religio—allowing rulers to determine the religion of their territories.

Two main Inquisitions remained active in the modern era:

- The Portuguese Inquisition (1536–1821), similar to the Spanish Inquisition.
- The Roman Inquisition (1542–circa 1860), covering most of the Italian peninsula and certain other areas.

The Counter-Reformation began in 1545 with the Council of Trent in response to the Protestant Reformation. Its goal was to reform internal Church practices while reaffirming the Church's authority as the true Church of Christ.

==== Tsardom of Russia ====
In development of the Third Rome ideas, the Grand Duke Ivan IV (the "Awesome" or "the Terrible") was officially crowned the first Tsar ("Caesar") of Russia in 1547. The Tsar promulgated a new code of laws (Sudebnik of 1550), established the first Russian feudal representative body (Zemsky Sobor), and introduced local self-management into the rural regions. During his long reign, Ivan IV nearly doubled the already large Russian territory by annexing the three Tatar khanates (parts of the disintegrated Golden Horde): Kazan and Astrakhan along the Volga River, and the Siberian Khanate in southwestern Siberia. Thus, by the end of the 16th century, Russia was transformed into a multiethnic, multiconfessional, and transcontinental state.

Russia experienced territorial growth through the 17th century, which was the age of Cossacks. Cossacks were warriors organized into military communities, resembling pirates and pioneers of the New World. The native land of the Cossacks is defined by a line of Russian/Ruthenian town-fortresses located on the border with the steppe and stretching from the middle Volga to Ryazan and Tula, then breaking abruptly to the south and extending to the Dnieper via Pereyaslavl. This area was settled by a population of free people practicing various trades and crafts.

==== Mercantile capitalism ====
===== Trade and the new economy =====
In the Old World, the most desired trading goods were gold, silver, and spices. Western Europeans used the compass, new sailing ship technologies, new maps, and advances in astronomy to seek a viable trade route to Asia for valuable spices that Mediterranean powers could not contest.

===== Piracy's Golden Age =====
The Golden Age of Piracy is a designation given to one or more outbursts of piracy in the early modern period, spanning from the mid-17th century to the mid-18th century. The buccaneering period covers approximately the late 17th century. This period was characterized by Anglo-French seamen based in Jamaica and Tortuga attacking Spanish colonies and shipping in the Caribbean and eastern Pacific. The Pirate Round was a route followed by certain Anglo-American pirates in the early 18th century, involving voyages from Bermuda and the Americas to attack Muslim and East India Company ships in the Indian Ocean and Red Sea. The post-War of the Spanish Succession period saw many unemployed sailors and privateers turning to piracy in the Caribbean, the American eastern seaboard, West Africa, and the Indian Ocean.

==== European states and politics ====
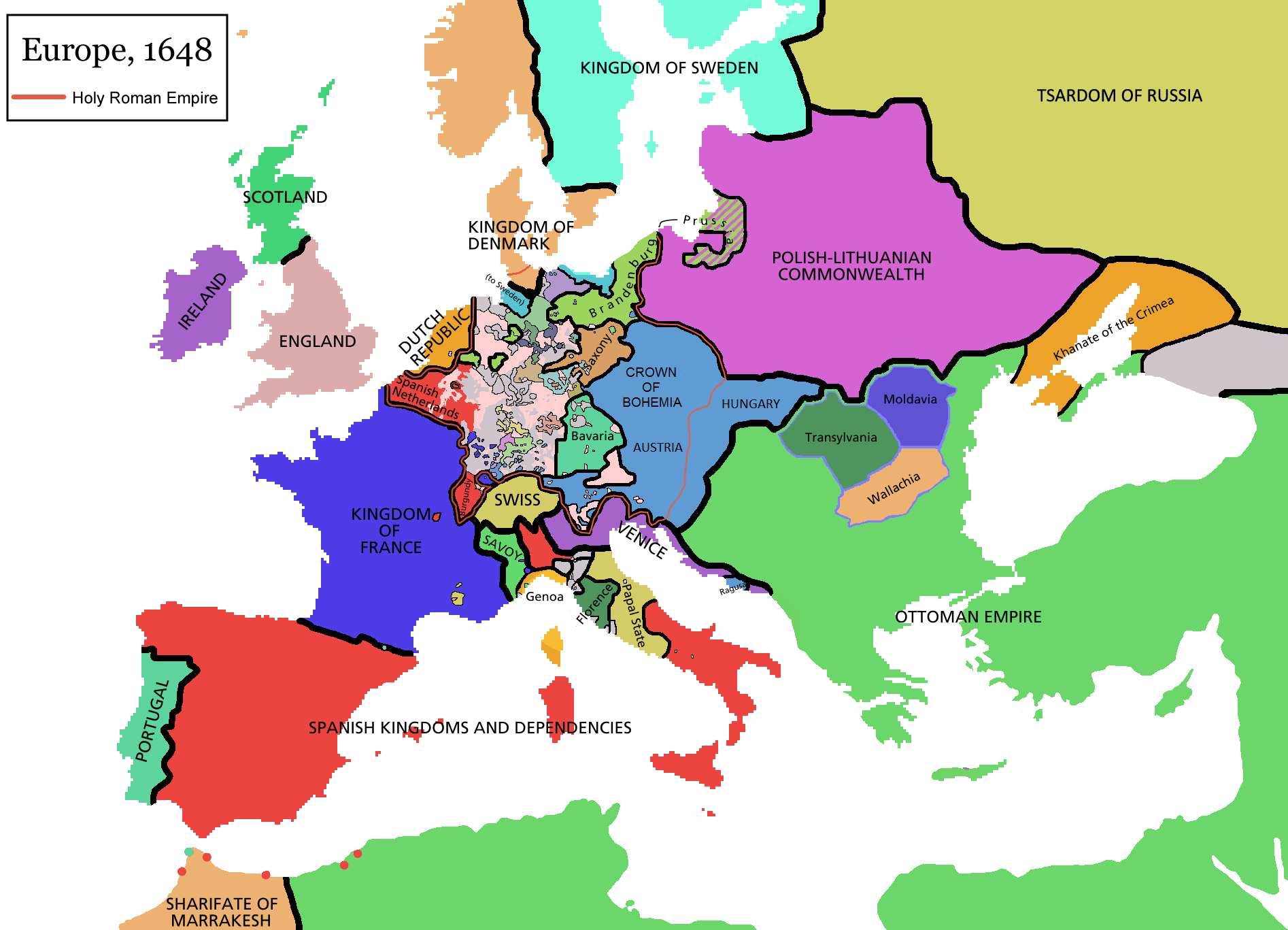
Europe after the Peace of Westphalia in 1648

The 15th to 18th century period is marked by the first European colonies, the rise of strong centralized governments, and the beginnings of recognizable European nation states that are the direct antecedents of today's states. Although the Renaissance included revolutions in many intellectual pursuits, as well as social and political upheaval, it is perhaps best known for European artistic developments and the contributions of such polymaths as Leonardo da Vinci and Michelangelo, who inspired the term "Renaissance man".

The Peace of Westphalia resulted from the first modern diplomatic congress. Until 1806, the regulations became part of the constitutional laws of the Holy Roman Empire. The Treaty of the Pyrenees, signed in 1659, ended the war between France and Spain and is often considered part of the overall accord.

===== French power =====
Men who featured prominently in the political and military life of France during this period include Mazarin, Colbert, Turenne, and Vauban. French culture likewise flourished during this era, producing a number of figures of great renown, including Molière, Racine, Boileau, La Fontaine, Lully, Le Brun, Rigaud, Louis Le Vau, Jules Hardouin Mansart, Claude Perrault and Le Nôtre.

===== Early English revolutions =====
Before the Age of Revolution, the English Civil War was a series of armed conflicts and political machinations between Parliamentarians and Royalists. The first and second civil wars pitted the supporters of King Charles I against the supporters of the Long Parliament, while the third war saw fighting between supporters of King Charles II and supporters of the Rump Parliament. The Civil War ended with the Parliamentary victory at the Battle of Worcester. The monopoly of the Church of England on Christian worship in England ended with the victors consolidating the established Protestant Ascendancy in Ireland. Constitutionally, the wars established the precedent that an English monarch cannot govern without Parliament's consent. The English Restoration, or simply put as the Restoration, began in 1660 when the English, Scottish and Irish monarchies were all restored under Charles II after the Commonwealth of England that followed the English Civil War. The Glorious Revolution of 1688 established modern parliamentary democracy in England.

===== International balance of power =====
The Peace of Utrecht—established after a series of individual peace treaties signed in the Dutch city of Utrecht, concluded between various European states—helped end the War of the Spanish Succession. The representatives who met were Louis XIV of France and Philip V of Spain on the one hand, and representatives of Queen Anne of Great Britain, the Duke of Savoy, and the United Provinces on the other. The treaty enregistered the defeat of French ambitions expressed in the wars of Louis XIV and preserved the European system based on the balance of power. The Treaty of Utrecht marked the change from Dutch to British naval supremacy.

== Americas ==
World Colonization of 1492 (Early Modern World), 1550, 1660, 1754 (Age of Enlightenment), 1822 (Industrial Revolution), 1885 (European Hegemony), 1914 (World War I era), 1938 (World War II era), 1959 (Cold War era) and 1974, 2008 (Recent history)

The term colonialism is normally used with reference to discontiguous overseas empires rather than contiguous land-based empires, European or otherwise. European colonization during the 15th to 19th centuries resulted in the spread of Christianity to Sub-Saharan Africa, the Americas, Australia and the Philippines.

=== Colonial Latin America ===
Initially, Portuguese settlements (Brazil) in the coastal northeast were of lesser importance in the larger Portuguese overseas empire, where lucrative commerce and small settlements devoted to trade were established in coastal Africa, India and China. With sparse indigenous populations that could not be coerced to work and no known deposits of precious metals, Portugal sought a high-value, low-bulk export product and found it in sugarcane. Black African slave labor from Portugal's West African possessions was imported to do the grueling agricultural work. As the wealth of the Ibero-America increased, some Western European powers (Dutch, French, British, Danish) sought to duplicate the model in areas that the Iberians had not settled in numbers. They seized some Caribbean islands from the Spanish and transferred the model of sugar production on plantations with slave labor and settled in northern areas of North America in what are now the Eastern Seaboard of the United States and Canada.

=== Colonial North America ===
John Trumbull's Declaration of Independence, showing the Committee of Five in charge of drafting the Declaration in 1776 as it presents its work to the Second Continental Congress in Philadelphia

North America outside the zone of Spanish settlement was a contested area in the 17th century. Spain had founded small settlements in Florida and Georgia, but nowhere near the size of those in New Spain or the Caribbean islands. France, the Netherlands, and Great Britain held colonies in North America and the West Indies from the 17th century, 100 years after the Spanish and Portuguese established permanent colonies. The British colonies in North America were founded between 1607 (Virginia) and 1733 (Georgia). The Dutch explored the east coast of North America and began founding settlements in what they called New Netherland (now New York State). France colonized what is now Eastern Canada, founding Quebec City in 1608. France's loss in the Seven Years' War resulted in the transfer of New France to Great Britain.

The Thirteen Colonies, in lower British North America, rebelled against British rule through 1765–1783, due to various factors such as belief in natural rights, the enforcement of new taxes levied by a Parliament in which they could not vote for representatives, and opposition to monarchy. The British colonies in Canada remained loyal to the crown, and a provisional government formed by the Thirteen Colonies proclaimed their independence on 4 July 1776, and subsequently became the original 13 United States of America. With the 1783 Treaty of Paris ending the American Revolutionary War, Britain recognized the former Thirteen Colonies' independence.

== Atlantic World ==
Waldseemüller map with joint sheets, 1507

A key development in early modern history is the creation of the Atlantic World as a category. The term generally encompasses Western Europe, West Africa, and the Americas. It seeks to illustrate both local and regional developments, as well as the connections between these geographical regions through trade, migration, and cultural exchange.

== Religion, science, philosophy, and education ==
=== Protestant Reformation ===
The early modern period was initiated by the Reformation and the collapse of the unity of the medieval Western Church. The theology of Calvinism in particular has been argued as instrumental to the rise of capitalism. Max Weber has written a highly influential book on this called The Protestant Ethic and the Spirit of Capitalism.

=== Counter-Reformation and Jesuits ===
The Counter-Reformation was a period of Catholic revival in response to the Reformation during the mid-16th to mid-17th centuries. The Counter-Reformation was a comprehensive effort, involving ecclesiastical reforms as well as political and spiritual movements.

Such reforms included the foundation of seminaries for the proper training of priests, the reform of religious life by returning orders to their spiritual foundations, and new spiritual movements focusing on the devotional life and a personal relationship with Christ, including the Spanish mystics and the French school of spirituality. It also involved political activities that included the Roman Inquisition.

New religious orders were a fundamental part of this trend. Orders such as the Capuchins, Ursulines, Theatines, Discalced Carmelites, the Barnabites, and especially the Jesuits strengthened rural parishes, improved popular piety, helped to curb corruption within the church, and set examples that would be a strong impetus for Catholic renewal.

=== Scientific Revolution ===
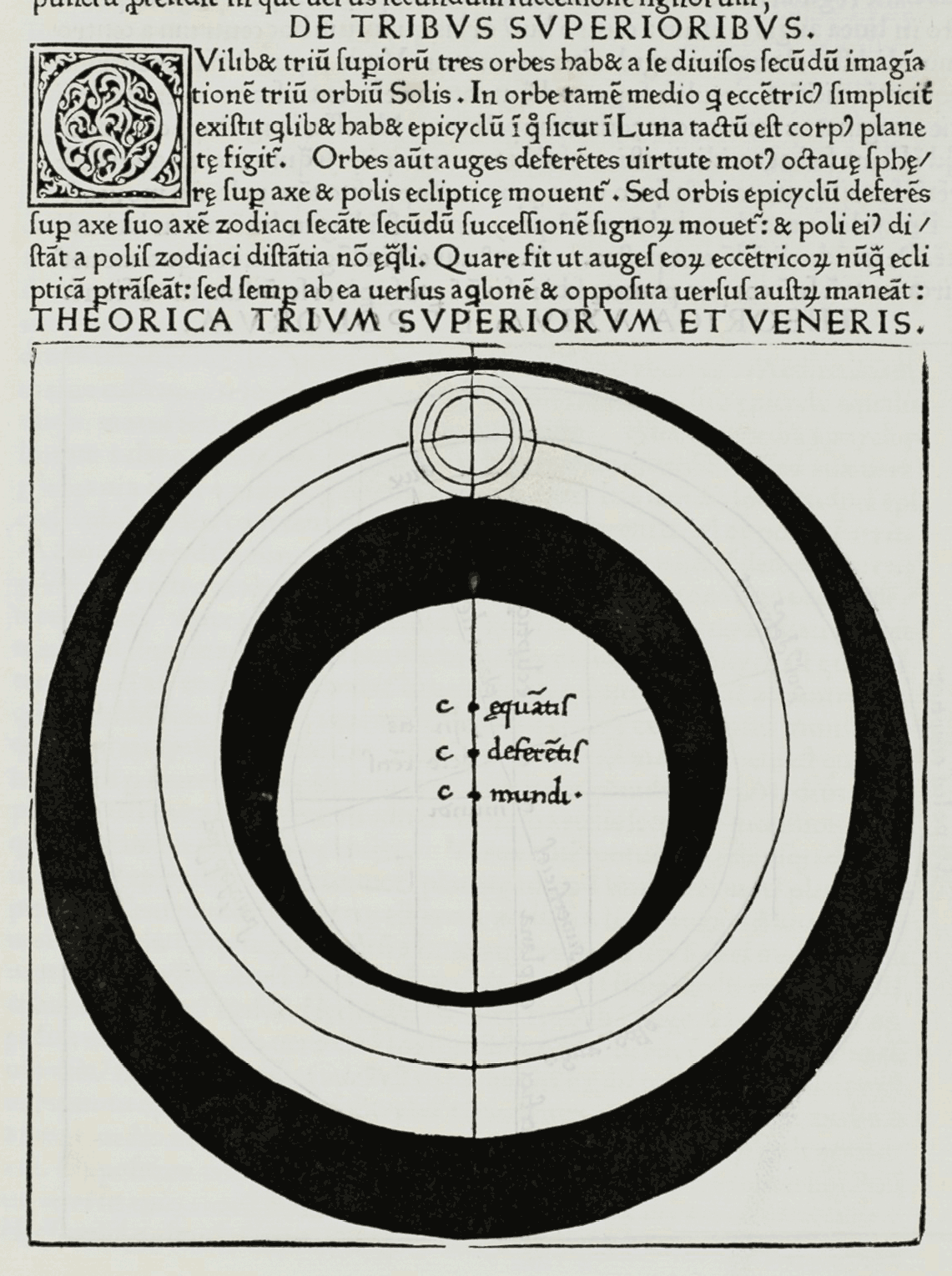
Model for the Three Superior Planets and Venus from Georg von Peuerbach, Theoricae novae planetarum

The Great Divergence in scientific discovery, technological innovation, and economic development began in the early modern period as the pace of change in Western countries increased significantly compared to the rest of the world.

During the Scientific Revolution of the 16th and 17th centuries, empiricism and modern science replaced older methods of studying nature, which had relied on ancient texts by writers like Aristotle. By the time of the Revolution, these methods resulted in an accumulation of knowledge that overturned ideas inherited from ancient Greece and Islamic scholars. Major changes during the Scientific Revolution and the 18th century included:

- The ancient geocentric model of the Solar System (the other planets circle the Earth) was replaced by heliocentrism (the planets circle the Sun). This shift, known as the Copernican Revolution, is marked by the 1543 publication of Nicolaus Copernicus's De revolutionibus orbium coelestium. Copernicus' work, influenced by earlier scholars such as Mu'ayyad al-Din al-Urdi, sparked a significant paradigm shift. The Catholic Church resisted this theory, and the Inquisition famously imprisoned Galileo Galilei for promoting it.
- Using precise astronomical observations by Tycho Brahe, Johannes Kepler developed Kepler's laws of planetary motion, demonstrating that planets move in ellipses rather than perfect circles. The idea that the stars were fixed on celestial spheres was replaced by the idea that stars are distant suns. Astrology and astronomy began to separate into different disciplines, with only astronomy using scientific methods. Telescope technology improved tremendously, as did the study of optics.
- Aristotle's laws of motion were replaced by Newton's laws of motion and Newton's law of universal gravitation. The 1687 publication of Isaac Newton's Principia Mathematica is often used to mark the end of the Scientific Revolution, as it established the fundamental laws of physics that would dominate scientific thinking for centuries.
- Advances in anatomy were marked by the publication of De Humani Corporis Fabrica Libri Septem (1543) by Andreas Vesalius, which revolutionized the understanding of human anatomy and corrected errors in the works of Galen. In 1628, William Harvey's De Motu Cordis advanced knowledge of the circulatory system.
- Both the 8th-century Islamic experimenter Jabir ibn Hayyan and the 17th-century scientist Robert Boyle have been described as founders of modern chemistry. Both worked as alchemists before the fields were clearly separated. Boyle argued for corpuscularianism in the 1661 book The Sceptical Chymist and discovered Boyle's law of gases. The chemical revolution followed with the discovery of the conservation of mass, which led to the rejection of phlogiston theory and the identification of chemical elements.
- Modern scientific dentistry was founded by Pierre Fauchard, who is credited with pioneering dental techniques in his 1728 work Le Chirurgien Dentiste.
- The smallpox vaccine was invented in the 1770s and popularized by Edward Jenner in the 1790s, though it was unclear at the time how it worked.
- The ancient theory of spontaneous generation remained dominant throughout the early modern period, but the history of evolutionary thought includes some who questioned the strictest form of this dogma. The idea of partial common descent was famously promoted by Georges-Louis Leclerc, Comte de Buffon. Evolution was not fully articulated and accepted until the 19th century.
- The invention of the microscope led to the development of microbiology, with early observations of microorganisms by Antonie van Leeuwenhoek in the 1670s.
- Carl Linnaeus published the first modern taxonomy in Systema Naturae (1735), introducing the classification of organisms into hierarchical categories and replacing Aristotle's ideas.
- Early modern geology was established with the work of Nicolas Steno, who proposed the law of superposition in 1669, and the systematic study of fossils and rock types began to question the biblical age of the Earth.
- Early developments in the history of electromagnetism included research into the relationship between electricity and magnetism, the development of the electrostatic generator, and the discovery of Coulomb's law in 1784, which described the force between electric charges.

In the social sciences:

- Historical linguistics began in the late 18th century, with William Jones identifying the common origin of what are now called Indo-European languages.
- The fields of anthropology and paleoanthropology emerged in the 18th century, but much of early modern anthropology is now considered scientific racism.
- Adam Smith's work, such as his seminal book The Wealth of Nations, has been interpreted as the foundation of classical economics.

=== Technology ===
Inventions of the early modern period included the floating dock, lifting tower, newspaper, grenade musket, lightning rod, bifocals, and Franklin stove. Early attempts at building a practical electrical telegraph were hindered because static electricity was the only source available.

=== Enlightenment and reason ===
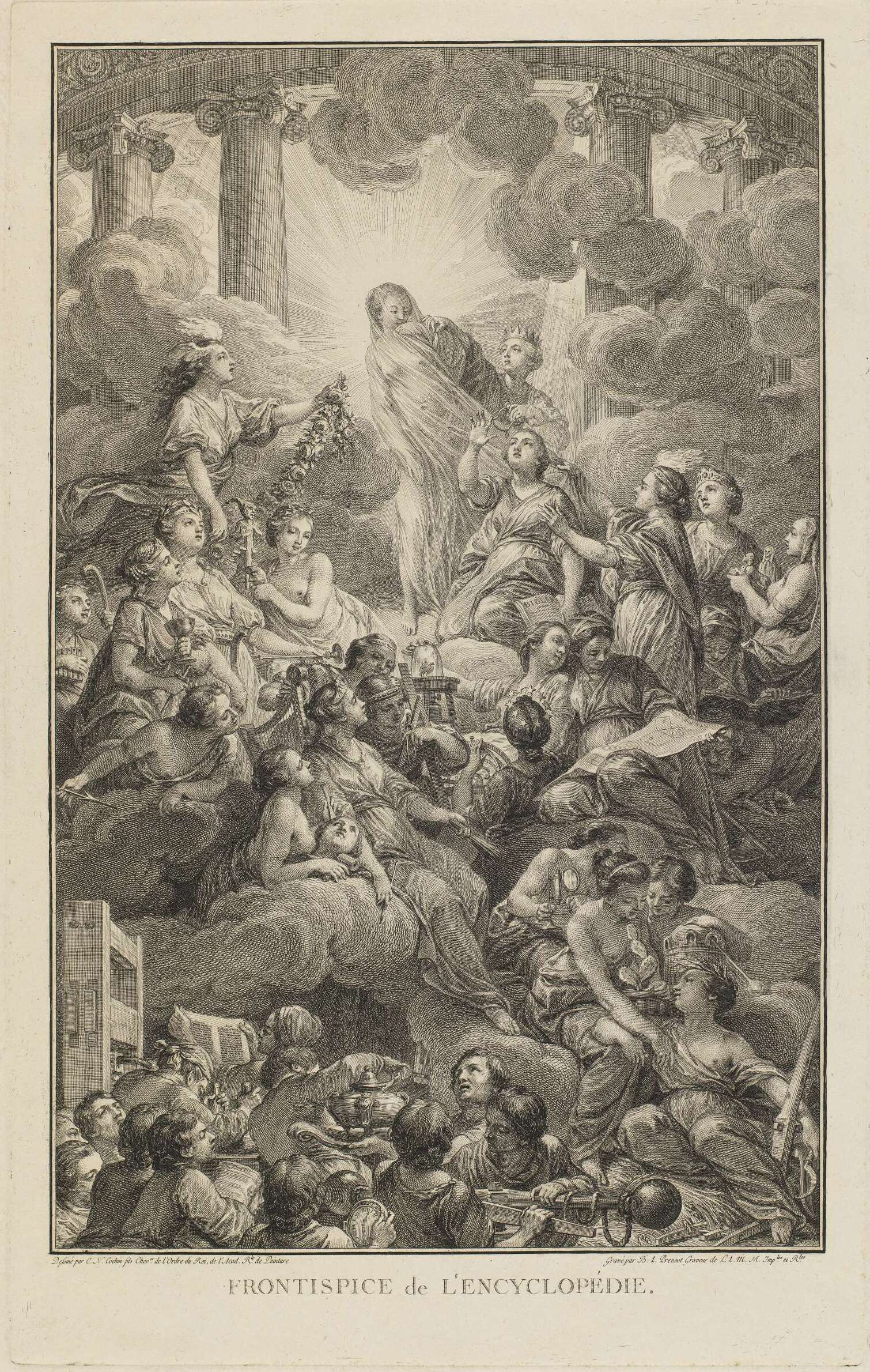
"If there is something you know, communicate it. If there is something you don't know, search for it." An engraving from the 1772 edition of the Encyclopédie; Truth (center) is surrounded by light and unveiled by the figures to the right, Philosophy and Reason.

The Age of Enlightenment is also called the Age of Reason because it marked a departure from the medieval tradition of scholasticism, which was rooted in Christian dogma, and from Renaissance philosophy's occultist approaches. Instead, reason became the central source of knowledge, initiating the era of modern philosophy, especially in Western philosophy. This period in Europe was characterized by system-builders—philosophers who established unified theories of epistemology, metaphysics, logic, ethics, and sometimes even politics and the physical sciences.

Early 17th-century philosophy is often referred to as the Age of Rationalism, succeeding Renaissance philosophy and preceding the Enlightenment. Some consider it the earliest part of the Enlightenment, stretching over two centuries. This era includes the works of Isaac Newton (1643–1727), such as Philosophiæ Naturalis Principia Mathematica (1687), and the development of Descartes' famous proposition Cogito, ergo sum (1637). The first major advancements in modern science included Newton's theory of gravity, which, along with the contributions of John Locke, Pierre Bayle, Baruch Spinoza, and others, fueled the Enlightenment.

The 18th century saw the rise of secularization in Europe, notably following the French Revolution. Immanuel Kant classified his predecessors into two philosophical schools: Rationalism and Empiricism. The former was represented by figures such as René Descartes, Baruch Spinoza, and Gottfried Leibniz. Roger Williams established the colony of Providence Plantations in New England on the principle of separation of church and state after being exiled by the Puritans of the Massachusetts Bay Colony.

French salon culture played a key role in spreading Enlightenment ideas, culminating in the influential Encyclopédie (1751–72), edited by Denis Diderot with contributions from thinkers such as Voltaire and Montesquieu. The Quarrel of the Ancients and the Moderns stirred debate within the French Academy, elevating contemporary knowledge over classical Greek and Roman wisdom. Enlightenment thought also significantly influenced German philosophy, fostered by Frederick the Great, with Immanuel Kant emerging as a leading figure. These developments also had profound impacts on the Scottish Enlightenment, Russian Enlightenment, Enlightenment in Spain, and Enlightenment in Poland. The Enlightenment flourished until around 1790–1800, after which the emphasis on reason gave way to Romanticism and the growing influence of Counter-Enlightenment movements.

=== Humanism ===
With the adoption of large-scale printing after 1500, Italian Renaissance Humanism spread northward to France, Germany, Holland and England, where it became associated with the Reformation.

Developing during the Enlightenment era, Renaissance humanism as an intellectual movement spread across Europe. The basic training of the humanist was to speak well and write (typically, in the form of a letter). The term umanista comes from the latter part of the 15th century. The people were associated with the studia humanitatis, a novel curriculum that was competing with the quadrivium and scholastic logic.

In France, pre-eminent Humanist Guillaume Budé (1467–1540) applied the philological methods of Italian Humanism to the study of antique coinage and to legal history, composing a detailed commentary on Justinian's Code. Although a royal absolutist (and not a republican like the early Italian umanisti), Budé was active in civic life, serving as a diplomat for Francis I and helping to found the Collège des Lecteurs Royaux (later the Collège de France). Meanwhile, Marguerite de Navarre, the sister of Francis I, herself a poet, novelist and religious mystic, gathered around her and protected a circle of vernacular poets and writers, including Clément Marot, Pierre de Ronsard and François Rabelais.

== Death in the early modern period ==
=== Mortality rates ===
During the early modern period, thorough and accurate global data on mortality rates is limited for a number of reasons, including disparities in medical practices and views on the dead. However, there still remains data from European countries that still holds valuable information on the mortality rates of infants during this era. In his book Life Under Pressure: Mortality and Living Standards in Europe and Asia, 1700–1900, Tommy Bengtsson provides adequate information pertaining to the data on infant mortality rates in European countries as well as provides necessary contextual influences on these mortality rates.

==== European infant mortality rates ====
Infant mortality was a global concern during the early modern period, as many newborns would not survive into childhood. Bengtsson provides comparative data on infant mortality averages in a variety of European towns, cities, regions and countries starting from the mid-1600s to the 1800s. These statistics are measured for infant deaths within the first month of every 1,000 births in a given area.

For instance, the average infant mortality rate in what is now Germany was 108 infant deaths for every 1,000 births; in Bavaria, there were 140–190 infant deaths reported for every 1,000 births. In France, Beauvaisis reported 140–160 infants dying per 1,000 babies born. In what is now Italy, Venice averaged 134 infant deaths per 1,000 births. In Geneva, 80–110 infants died per 1,000 babies born. In Sweden, 70–95 infants died per 1,000 births in Linköping, 48 infants died per 1,000 births in Sundsvall, and 41 infants died per 1,000 births in Vastanfors.

==== Causes of infant mortality ====
Bengtsson writes that climate conditions were the most important factor in determining infant mortality rates: "For the period from birth to the fifth birthday, [climate] is clearly the most important determinant of death". Winters proved to be harsh on families and their newborns, especially if the other seasons of the year were warmer. This seasonal drop in temperature was a lot for an infant's body to adapt to.

For instance, Italy is home to a very warm climate in the summer, and the temperature drops immensely in the winter. This lends context to Bengtsson's writing that "the [Italian] winter peak was the cruelest: during the first 10 days of life, a newborn was four times more likely to die than in the summer". According to Bengtsson, this trend existed among cities in different parts of Italy and in various parts of Europe even though cities operated under different economic and agricultural conditions. This leads Bengtsson to his conclusion on what may have caused mortality rates in infants to spike during winter: "The strong protective effect of summer for neonatal deaths leads us to suppose that in many cases, these might be due to the insufficient heating systems of the houses or to the exposure of the newborn to cold during the baptism ceremony. This last hypothesis could explain why the effect was so strong in Italy".

=== Capital punishment ===
During the early modern period, many societies' views on death changed greatly. With the implementation of new torture techniques and increased public executions, people began to give more value to their lives, as well as their bodies after death. Along with the views on death, methods of execution also changed. New devices to torture and execute criminals were invented. The number of criminals executed by gibbeting increased, as did the total rate of executions during the early modern period.

== See also ==
- Cuisine in the early modern world
- Early modern warfare
- Periodization
- Price revolution
- Proto-globalization

Preceded by Postclassical Era	History by period about 1500–1800 CE	Succeeded by modern period
