= Proportionalism =

Ethical theory

Proportionalism is a moral theological view developed in the 1960s by Roman Catholic theologians. It proposes that when a decision is made, it is necessary to consider all positive and negative consequences in context.

== History and definitions ==
What came to be known as proportionalism first developed among Roman Catholic moral theologians from the mid 1960s onwards, largely as a reaction to what had long been traditional Catholic teaching about a small number of acts which were deemed to be intrinsically evil (always morally wrong), regardless of circumstances. Its proponents hold that, when we are endeavoring to ascertain the moral rightness or wrongness of an act, we need to take into account all the positive and negative consequences of that act in whatever is the particular context.

== Debate within the Church ==
The following comment was made by Cardinal Ratzinger, who later became Pope Benedict XVI:

The attempt to assess the proportion of the good or bad likely to proceed from a proposed action is really a common-sense judgment we all make rather routinely.

Like others who upheld traditional teaching, however, Ratzinger believed that this common-sense way of proceeding could not be applied across the board. There are, he said, exceptions. This was so in spite of the fact that, as a number of commentators began to observe in the 1970s, some of the most well-known Catholic moral theologians were proportionalists, and most of the others seemed not to be far removed from that position.

Early contributions to debate about proportionalism appeared in Europe in the 1960s and early 70s in the form of a series of articles written by a number of Catholic scholars, principal among them perhaps being the Belgian moral theologian Louis Janssens, the German Josef Fuchs and, another German, Bruno Schüller, both of whom were also moral theologians. A number of American moral theologians began to participate in the 1970s . One such was Richard McCormick. Debate eventually ensued between these moral theologians and a number of other Catholic scholars, perhaps the most intense opposition coming from a group led by two philosophers, one American and the other Australian, Germain Grisez and John Finnis. These latter promoted their own alternative ‘Basic Goods Theory’. Debate between the two schools went on for many years, mainly by means of articles published in learned journals. In 1987, however, a book was published which both summarized and analysed the debate from a proportionalist point of view. The author was the British moral theologian Bernard Hoose, who went on to add contributions of his own to the debate that continued in learned journals.

Pope John Paul II showed his disapproval of proportionalism in his encyclical letter Veritatis splendor (The Splendor of Truth) which was published in 1993. It was, however, the opinion of numerous scholars that the pope had a poor understanding of the matter, and a swift response to the encyclical came in the form of a book entitled The Splendor of Accuracy. His encyclical may have succeeded in encouraging Catholic scholars who were interested in change and development to indulge in further analysis of subjects related to proportionalism, and to maintain their interest for years to come. For example, twenty-six years after the promulgation of the encyclical, Selling and Nenad Polgar edited a book entitled The Concept of Intrinsic Evil and Catholic Theological Ethics, with contributions from several Catholic scholars. In an endorsement on the cover of the book, James Keenan opines: 'This collection effectively suggests, I think, that the credible utility of the concept has run its course'.

== Examples and ontic evil ==
Long before the advent of the debate about proportionalism, the mutilation involved in surgery had been approved of in official Catholic teaching, provided the particular act of surgery was the best that could be done for the patient. Even when the surgery was justifiable, the mutilation (just as a killing in a case of legitimate self- defence or legitimate defense of a third party) was traditionally referred to as a physical evil (malum physicum). The use of this terminology was not intended to indicate that the act was anything other than morally right. Rather the designation of an element or consequence as a physical evil merely indicated that it was something negative that had to be justified. It is, of course, possible for an act of surgery to be other than the best that could be done for the patient. Clearly, in such a case, causing the physical evil that is mutilation could not be justified, and the act would be morally wrong. Proportionalists went along with this traditional line of thinking. However, because the word ‘physical’ tends to conjure up thoughts of materiality nowadays - and not all of the negative consequences of an act are material - they replaced ‘physical evil’ with other terminology. Thus, some began to speak of nonmoral evils, some of premoral evils and others of ontic evils. These, they said, should be avoided inasmuch as it is possible to do so. Louis Janssens’ definition of ontic evil applies equally to premoral evil and nonmoral evil: Ontic evil, he said, is what we call ‘any lack of a perfection at which we aim, any lack of fulfilment which frustrates our natural urges and makes us suffer.’

It is sometimes erroneously claimed that, according to proportionalists, a person may act against an absolute norm if one has a proportionate reason for doing so. Rather than this, proportionalists argue, entirely logically, that, if an exception to a norm exists, that norm is not absolute. In practise, of course, this has led to a situation in which certain norms which are held to absolute within traditional Catholic teaching are, as proportionalists see things, not absolute. Taking a look at debate about the ban on telling untruths with the intention of deceiving, which is upheld in some quarters, including traditional Catholic moral teaching, should help to clarify things. Many of the most influential figures in the history of Christianity adopted St. Augustine’s line that all intentional deception through false communication is wrong, even when an innocent person’s life is at stake. Eventually, some people in Catholic circles began to teach that, in extreme cases where, for instance, innocent life is at stake, one may use mental reservation or equivocation. Such practices, of course, require quick thinking, and, it could be argued, are unlikely to have the desired effect in most cases. Suppose that a badly wounded friend of yours is hiding in your house. An enemy soldier arrives and asks you if he is there. Accepting that it would be wrong to say ‘no’ and not being able to think of anything else to utter, you say ‘yes’. Hoose points out that, according to traditional Catholic teaching, if the soldier then attacks your friend, you may defend him, using whatever force is necessary. If there are several soldiers, and they all attack your friend, you may even go so far as to kill all of them, if that is necessary. ‘Such an act would be legitimate defense of a third party, and the tradition of Catholic moral theology down through the centuries would uphold the legitimacy of your act. But, of course, you might have been able to avoid all that bloodshed by telling a little untruth.’ Joseph Selling observes that

human experience testifies to a certain prejudice towards truth-telling; we would rather tell the truth all the time, but we sometimes judge that a greater harm is done by doing so than by deceiving another person. This is conflict. It is real, human, demonstrable, and it pervades the whole of life.

Arguing in favor of an absolute ban, however, Germain Grisez argues that ‘(l)ying and other deception …. divide the inner and outer selves of those who engage in them….while impeding or attacking the real community that truthful communication would foster.’ In response, Hoose points out that ‘resorting to violence might also be described as something that divides the inner and outer aspects of the self, especially if one is at heart a peace-lover (and, indeed, a peacemaker). As for attacking and impeding community, is anything better designed for that than violence?’ Referring to the matter of telling an untruth to a person who would kill an innocent, he points out

that real community is already under attack from the would-be murderer. If there are cases in which the existence of such attacks renders a proportionate use of violence justifiable, surely something similar can be said of lying. If it is helpful to call it the lesser evil, then let us do so. In both cases we have instances of that conflict to which Selling refers. ‘It is real, human demonstrable, and it pervades the whole of life.

Like the proportionalists, members of the Grisez/Finnis school of thought are natural law thinkers. They hold that there are certain basic goods which are self-evident. They ‘perfect persons and contribute to their fulfilment both as individuals and in communities’. Examples are life health and safety, knowledge and aesthetic experience, inner peace, and friendship. It is self-evident, they say, that no rational behavior could ever be directed against one of these basic goods, which are incommensurable. According to their way of thinking, the very notion of a proportionate reason for choosing one basic good over another makes no sense. Edward Vacek, on the other hand, made the important observation that humans are not mere computers that can only deal with data that is reducible to a common denominator. They function in more complex ways. We do succeed in comparing values. If this were not the case, he says, we would not be able to claim that humans are more valuable than stones. How precisely we go about this process may not always be clear, but trapping ourselves within the confines of ideas we have and the limits of language seems not to be the way to gain enlightenment. In order to illustrate the limitations and untidiness that can arise in the use of language, let us return briefly to the conflict between telling the truth and protecting innocent life.

Suppose that, under no duress, Fred tells our homicidal maniac where he can find Mary, knowing that Mary is the maniac’s intended victim. He does so merely because he worships the truth. The maniac thereupon finds Mary and kills her. When other people discover what Fred has done, they are appalled and say. ‘Fred, how could you do such a thing?’ Some would say that the meaning of this question is: ‘How could you bring yourself to do such an evil thing as to tell the truth in such circumstances?’

Numerous moral theologians have pointed out that life is messy, and that it is within this messiness that we have to make moral choices. No doubt, we can gain knowledge and insight from our experience and the experience of others down through the centuries, but can we find assistance elsewhere? In articles that were not devoted to proportionalism, Hoose analyses the role played by intuition in moral decision making. Among other things, he suggests that basic moral intuitions can be hidden from people in situations or cultures of sin. Thus, for example, large numbers of Catholics and Protestants (but certainly not all) were blinded, it seems, to the sheer immorality of the so-called witch trials and executions, and the immorality of slavery. The idea of slowly developing moral wisdom that might be suggested as an explanation of why the immorality of slavery and witch-burning are now obvious to us is easily countered by evidence of earlier wisdom within the ranks of Christians long before the particular situations of sin referred to came into existence.

== See also ==
- Doctrine of double effect
- Just war theory
- Prima facie right
- Situational ethics
- Summum bonum
- Natural Moral Law
