= Situational ethics =

Concept in ethics

Situational ethics or situation ethics takes into account only the particular context of an act when evaluating it ethically, rather than judging it only according to absolute moral standards. With the intent to have a fair basis for judgments or action, one looks to personal ideals of what is appropriate to guide them, rather than an unchanging universal code of conduct, such as Biblical law under divine command theory or the Kantian categorical imperative. Proponents of situational approaches to ethics include existentialist philosophers such as Sartre, de Beauvoir, Merleau-Ponty, Jaspers, and Heidegger.

Specifically Christian forms of situational ethics placing love above all particular principles or rules were proposed in the first half of the twentieth century by liberal theologians Rudolf Bultmann, John A. T. Robinson, and Joseph Fletcher. These theologians point specifically to agapē, or unconditional love, as the highest end. Other theologians who advocated situational ethics include Josef Fuchs, Reinhold Niebuhr, Karl Barth, Emil Brunner, and Paul Tillich. Tillich, for example, declared that "Love is the ultimate law."

Fletcher, who became prominently associated with this approach in the English-speaking world due to his book (Situation Ethics), stated that "all laws and rules and principles and ideals and norms, are only contingent, only valid if they happen to serve love" in the particular situation, and thus may be broken or ignored if another course of action would achieve a more loving outcome. Fletcher has sometimes been identified as the founder of situation ethics, but he himself refers his readers to the active debate over the theme that preceded his own work.

== Ethical classification and origin of term ==
Situational ethics is a form of consequentialism (though distinct from utilitarianism in that the latter's aim is "the greatest good for the greatest number") that focuses on creating the greatest amount of love. Situational ethics can also be classed under the ethical theory genre of "proportionalism" which says that "It is never right to go against a principle unless there is a proportionate reason which would justify it." J. A. T. Robinson, a situational ethicist, considered the approach to be a form of ethical relativism.

There was an active debate in the mid-twentieth century around situational ethics, which was being promoted by a number of primarily Protestant theologians. The English term "situation ethics" was taken from the German Situationsethik. It is unclear who first coined the term either in German or in its English variant.

== Joseph Fletcher ==
Fletcher proposed that in forming an ethical system based on love, he was best expressing the notion of "love thy neighbor," which Jesus Christ taught in the Gospels of the New Testament of the Bible. Through situational ethics, Fletcher was attempting to find a "middle road" between legalistic and antinomian ethics. Fletcher developed his theory of situational ethics in his books: The Classic Treatment and Situation Ethics. Situational ethics is thus a teleological or consequential theory, in that it is primarily concerned with the outcome or consequences of an action; the end. Fletcher proposed that loving ends justify any means. He abandoned his theistic belief in his later life but never strayed away from his belief in situation ethics.

Fletcher outlined his theory in four "working principles" and six "fundamental principles".

=== The four working principles ===
The following are presuppositions Fletcher makes before setting out the situation(al) ethics theory:

1. Pragmatism: An action someone makes should be judged according to the love influenced in it, so the user must always ask: what is the most loving thing to do? For example, war may not – to a situationist – be considered the most 'loving' thing and so many are quick to deem it as morally wrong.
2. Relativism: Approaching every situation with a relative mindset and thus opposing legalistic approaches – avoid words such as 'never', 'complete' and 'perfect'.
3. Positivism: The most important choice of all in the teachings in 1 John 4:7–12 is "let us love one another because love is from God".
4. Personalism: Whereas the legalist thinks people should work to laws, the situational ethicist believes that laws benefit the people. This forces the user to ask 'who is to be helped?' instead of 'what is the law', stressing the importance of people before laws.

=== The six fundamental principles (propositions) ===
First proposition
Only one thing is intrinsically good; namely love: nothing else at all. Fletcher (1966, p. 56) – an action is good only in so far as it brings about agape.
Second proposition
The ruling norm of Christian decision is love: nothing else. Fletcher (1966, p. 69) – the most important commandment is to love God and "love thy neighbour".
Third proposition
Love and Justice are the same, for justice is love distributed, nothing else. Fletcher (1966, p. 87) – asks that one must always have an eye on the intention of an action.
Justice is Christian love using its head, calculating its duties, obligations, opportunities, resources... Justice is love coping with situations where distribution is called for. Fletcher (1966, p. 95)
Fourth proposition
Love wills the neighbour's good, whether we like him or not. Fletcher (1966, p. 103) – illustrates that agape is not an emotion as it sometimes involves sacrifice, we must thus love not expecting anything in return.
Fifth proposition
Only the end justifies the means, nothing else. Actions only acquire moral status as a means to an end; for Fletcher, the end must be the most loving result. When measuring a situation, one must consider the desired end, the means available, the motive for acting and the foreseeable consequences. Fletcher (1966, p. 120) – thus, you must recognise that anything may be done if it brings about the most loving outcome.
Sixth proposition
Love's decisions are made situationally, not prescriptively. Fletcher (1966, p. 134) - nothing is inherently right or wrong, everything should be done according to the most loving thing specific to the situation.

=== Examples ===
Fletcher proposed various examples of situations in which the established moral laws might need to be put on hold in order to achieve the greater amount of love. These were based upon real situations.

==== Himself Might his Quietus Make ====
I dropped in on a patient at the hospital who explained that he only had a set time to live. The doctors could give him some pills (that would cost $40 every three days) that would keep him alive for the next three years, but if he didn't take the pills, he’d be dead within six months. Now he was insured for $100,000, double indemnity and that was all the insurance he had. But if he took the pills and lived past next October when the insurance was up for renewal, they were bound to refuse the renewal, and his insurance would be canceled. So he told me that he was thinking that if he didn't take the pills, then his family would get left with some security, and asked my advice on the situation.

Pragmatism, positivism, relativism and personalism are the four working principles which mean to be reasonably sure the act you take will work and provide the most loving consequence, accepting Situational Ethics as a matter of faith and not reason, each situation must be relative to love and bring about the most loving result and finally the needs of people come first rather than a set of rules.

==== Special Bombing Mission No. 13 ====
When the atomic bomb was dropped on Hiroshima, the plane crew were silent. Captain Lewis uttered six words, "My God, what have we done?" Three days later another bomb was dropped on Nagasaki by the United States. About 152,000 were killed, many times more were wounded and burned, to die later. The next day Japan sued for peace. When deciding whether to use "the most terrible weapon ever known" the US President appointed an Interim Committee made up of distinguished and responsible people in the government. Most but not all of its military advisors favoured using it. Top-level scientists said they could find no acceptable alternative to using it, but they were opposed by equally able scientists. After lengthy discussions, the committee decided that the lives saved by ending the war swiftly by using this weapon outweighed the lives destroyed by using it and thought that the best course of action.

==== Christian Cloak and Dagger ====
I was reading "Biblical Faith and Social Ethics", Clinton Gardner's book on a shuttle plane to New York. Next to me sat a young woman of about twenty-eight or so, attractive and well turned out in expensive clothes of good taste. She showed some interest in my book, and I asked if she'd like to look at it. "No", she said, "I'd rather talk." What about? "Me." I knew this meant good-bye to the reading. "I have a problem I'm confused about. You might help me to decide," she explained... There was a war going on that her government believed could be stopped by some clever use of espionage and blackmail. However, this meant she had to seduce and sleep with an enemy spy in order to lure him into blackmail. Now this went against her morals, but if it brought the war to an end, saving thousands of lives, would it be worth breaking those standards?

These situations were criticised as being extreme. Joseph Fletcher agreed that they were, as general guidelines should apply in normal cases, with exceptions for extreme cases.

== Criticism ==
In his autobiography, philosopher Mortimer J. Adler characterized situation ethics as a "half-baked theory of conduct aired during the early sixties. It is morally wrong." Some have argued that it is not a true Christian ethic, as it ignores absolute moral commands in its emphasis on the concept of agape.

== See also ==
- Biblical law in Christianity – Legal aspects of the Bible
- Biblical Sabbath – Weekly day of rest or time of worship given in the Bible as the seventh day
- Casuistry – Reasoning by extrapolation
- Graded absolutism – Theory of moral absolutism in Christian ethics
- Illegalism
- Moral relativism – Philosophical positions
- The Philosophy of Freedom – Philosophical treatise by Rudolf Steiner
- Pragmatic ethics – Theory of normative philosophical ethics and meta-ethics
- Prima facie right – Right that can be outweighed by other considerations
- Role ethics – Ethical theory based on family roles
