= Joseph Fletcher =

American professor and founder of situational ethics (1905–1991)

The Reverend Joseph Fletcher
- Born: Joseph Francis Fletcher; April 10, 1905; Newark, New Jersey, U.S.
- Died: October 28, 1991 (aged 86); Charlottesville, Virginia, U.S.
- Education: West Virginia University, Berkeley Divinity School, Yale University, London School of Economics
- Occupations: Theologian, Episcopal priest, educator, author
- Employer(s): Episcopal Theological School, Harvard University, University of Virginia
- Known for: Situational ethics, biomedical ethics
- Awards: Humanist of the Year

Joseph Francis Fletcher (April 10, 1905 – October 28, 1991) was an American professor who founded the theory of situational ethics in the 1960s. Fletcher was a pioneer in the field of bioethics, and a leading academic proponent of the potential benefits of abortion, infanticide, euthanasia, eugenics, and cloning. He was ordained as an Episcopal priest, later identifying himself as an atheist.

== Early life and education ==
Joseph F. Fletcher was born in Newark, New Jersey on April 10, 1905. He graduated from West Virginia University and later attended the Berkeley Divinity School and Yale University.

== Career ==
Fletcher, a prolific academic, taught; participated in symposia; and completed ten books, and hundreds of articles, book reviews, and translations. He taught Christian Ethics at Episcopal Divinity School (established to train people for ordination in the American Episcopal Church), Cambridge, Massachusetts, and at Harvard Divinity School from 1944 to 1970. He was the first professor of medical ethics at the University of Virginia and co-founded the Program in Biology and Society there. He retired from teaching in 1977.

In 1974, the American Humanist Association named him Humanist of the Year. He was one of the signers of the Humanist Manifesto.

Fletcher grew to believe strongly in the right to die with dignity, and he served as president of the Euthanasia Society of America (later renamed the Society for the Right to Die) from 1974 to 1976. He was also a member of the American Eugenics Society and the Association for Voluntary Sterilization.

== Personal life and death ==
Fletcher was active in social causes throughout his life, including labor rights. He supported the Southern Tenant Farmers' Union and was assaulted on two occasions while lecturing in the South. During the McCarthy era, he was criticized by congressional committees and was labeled "the Red Churchman" by Senator Joseph McCarthy.

In the late 1960s, Fletcher publicly renounced his belief in God and identified as a humanist, although he maintained relationships with religious organizations and clergy members.

He was married to Forrest Hatfield Fletcher, who collaborated with birth control advocate Margaret Sanger. She died in 1988 after 60 years of marriage. Fletcher later married Elizabeth Hobbs Fletcher. He had one daughter, Jane Fletcher Geniesse, and a son, Joseph F. Fletcher Jr., who was a Harvard University historian.

Fletcher died on October 28, 1991, at the University of Virginia Medical Center in Charlottesville, Virginia, from cardiovascular disease. He was 86 years old.

== Quotes ==
- "mercy killing" is justified for "an incorrigible 'human vegetable,' whether spontaneously functioning or artificially supported, [who] is progressively degraded while constantly eating up private or public financial resources in violation of the distributive justice owed to others." Joseph Fletcher, "Ethics and Euthanasia," in Horan and Mall, eds., Death, Dying, and Euthanasia, p. 301.
- "People [with children with Down's syndrome]... have no reason to feel guilty about putting a Down's syndrome baby away, whether it's "put away" in the sense of hidden in a sanitarium or in a more responsible lethal sense. It is sad; yes. Dreadful. But it carries no guilt. True guilt arises only from an offense against a person, and a Down's is not a person."

== Notable works ==
- (1954) Morals and Medicine N.J.: Princeton University Press.
- (1966) Situation Ethics: The New Morality, Philadelphia: Westminster Press. (translated into 5 languages)
- (1974) The Ethics of Genetic Control: Ending Reproductive Roulette. New York: Doubleday.
