= Prima facie right =

Right that can be outweighed by other considerations

A prima facie right is a right that can be outweighed by other considerations. It stands in contrast with absolute rights, which cannot be outweighed by anything. Some authors consider an absolute right as a prima facie right, but one that cannot be outweighed in any possible situation. It is also maintained that all men always have a prima facie rights to liberty, security, and life but they do not constitute actual rights if there are stronger prima facie rights or moral considerations that supervene. An act may also be viewed as prima facie right but viewed in others as prima facie wrong.

== See also ==
- Natural and legal rights
- Political ethics
- Prima facie
- Proportionalism
- Situational ethics
