= Joseph Fletcher (historian) =

American historian of China and Central Asia

Joseph Francis Fletcher Jr. (1934–1984) was an American historian of China and Central Asia and a professor in the East Asian Languages and Civilizations Department of Harvard University. His main areas of research included interaction between the Islamic and Chinese worlds, Manchu and Mongol studies.

== Biography ==
Fletcher graduated from Harvard University in 1957. He received his PhD from Harvard's Department of Far Eastern Languages in 1965 and became an assistant professor within the department a year later. In 1972, he was appointed professor of Chinese and Central Asian History.

Fletcher died from complications related to cancer on 14 June 1984, at the age of 49.

== Personal life ==
Fletcher was the son of Joseph Fletcher, an ethicist. Fletcher had two children.

== Notable works ==
Joseph Fletcher contributed several chapters ("Ch'ing Inner Asia, c. 1800" and others) to volume 10 of The Cambridge History of China.

Joseph Fletcher's posthumously published work, The Naqshbandiyya in Northwest China (Variorum, 1995), remains one of the main English-languages sources on the introduction of Sufism into China, and is extensively cited by practically all books in English on Islam in China published since then.

Another posthumously published work by Fletcher, the unfinished essay "Integrative History: Parallels and Interconnections in the Early Modern Period, 1500–1800", is an early argument in favor of applying the early modern periodization to all of Eurasia and a preliminary exploration of its global applicability.
