= Ought implies can =

Ethical formula

"Ought implies can" is an ethical formula ascribed to Immanuel Kant that claims an agent, if morally obliged to perform a certain action, must logically be able to perform it:

For if the moral law commands that we ought to be better human beings now, it inescapably follows that we must be capable of being better human beings.

The action to which the "ought" applies must indeed be possible under natural conditions.

Kant believed this principle was a categorical freedom, bound only by the free will as opposed to the Humean hypothetical freedom ("Free to do otherwise if I had so chosen"). There are several ways of deriving the formula—for example, the argument that it is wrong to blame people for things that they cannot control (essentially phrasing the formula as the contrapositive "'cannot' implies 'has no duty to'").

This ethical formula can be expressed in deontic logic with the multimodal axiom: $OA \to \Diamond A$, where the deontic operator $O$ means "It's obligatory that..." and the alethic operator $\Diamond$ means "It's possible that...". However, in practical situations, obligations are usually assigned in anticipation of future events, in which case alethic possibilities can be hard to judge; Therefore, obligation assignments may be performed under the assumption of different conditions on different branches of timelines in the future, and past obligation assignments may be updated due to unforeseen developments that happened along the timeline.

By the contrapositive, the logical equivalent of "ought implies can" is the formula $\Box \neg A \to \neg OA$, which means "impossible implies omissible".
